= 2016 term United States Supreme Court opinions of Clarence Thomas =

The 2016 term of the Supreme Court of the United States began October 3, 2016, and concluded October 1, 2017. This was the twenty-sixth term of Associate Justice Clarence Thomas's tenure on the Court.
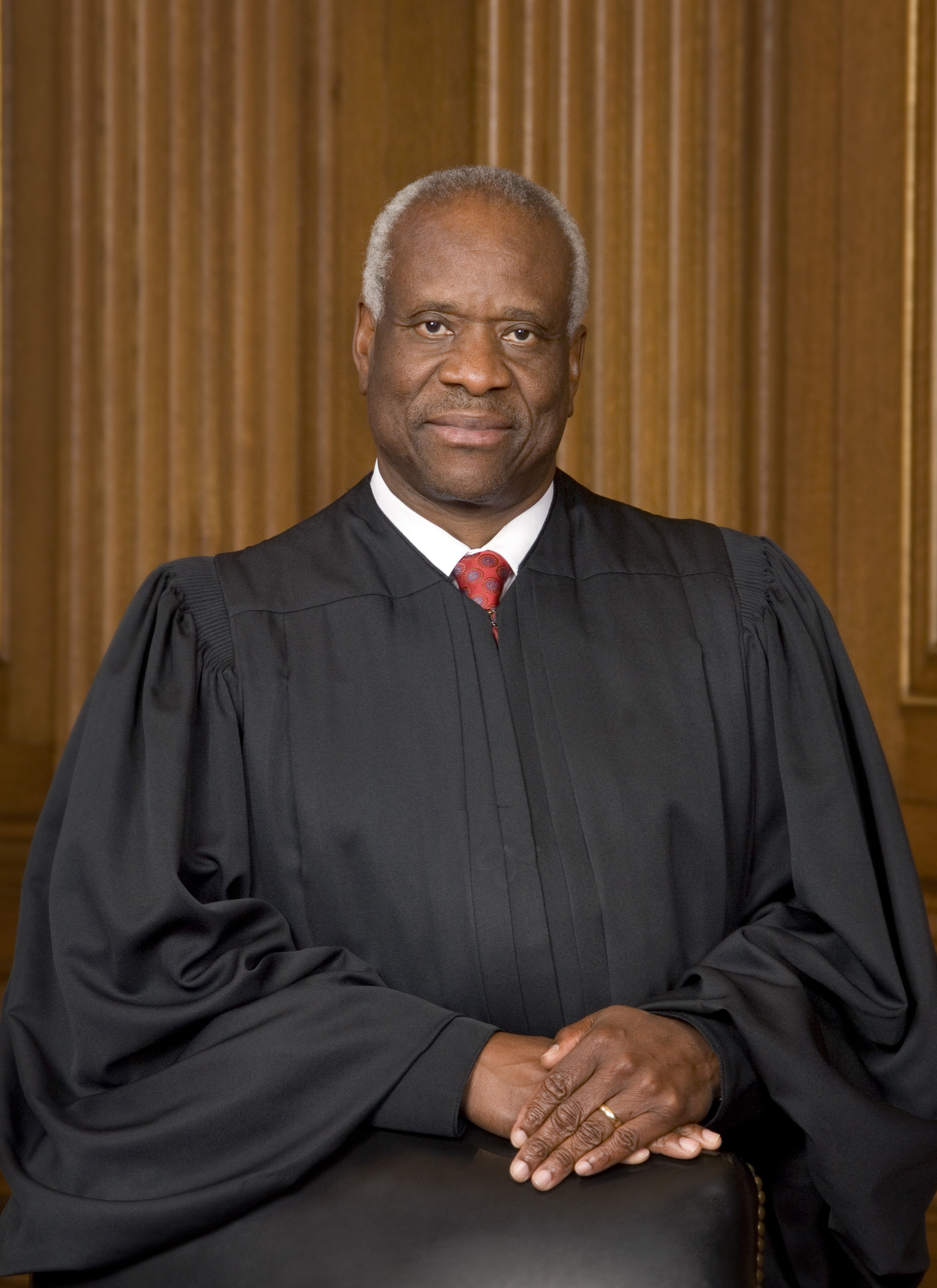

Clarence Thomas 2016 term statistics

7	Majority or plurality	13	Concurrence	1	Other
11	Dissent	3	Concurrence/dissent	Total =	35
Bench opinions = 32		Opinions relating to orders = 3		In-chambers opinions = 0
Unanimous opinions: 1		Most joined by: Alito (14 in full, 1 in part)		Least joined by: Ginsburg (3)

Type	Case	Citation	Issues	Joined by	Other opinions
	Bosse v. Oklahoma	580 U.S. ___ (2016)	Eighth Amendment • death penalty • victim impact evidence • opinions of victim's family on sentencing	Alito	per curiam
	Bravo-Fernandez v. United States	580 U.S. ___ (2016)	Double Jeopardy Clause • issue preclusion		Ginsburg
	Buck v. Davis	580 U.S. ___ (2017)	certificate of appealability • Sixth Amendment • ineffective assistance of counsel • jury consideration of race in imposing death penalty	Alito	Roberts
	Bethune-Hill v. Virginia State Bd. of Elections	580 U.S. ___ (2017)	consideration of race in legislative redistricting • Equal Protection Clause • Voting Rights Act		Kennedy; Alito
	Pena-Rodriguez v. Colorado	580 U.S. ___ (2017)	Sixth Amendment • racial bias expressed during jury deliberation • no-impeachment rule		Kennedy; Alito
	Beckles v. United States	580 U.S. ___ (2017)	Federal Sentencing Guidelines • residual clause • Due Process Clause • void for vagueness doctrine	Roberts, Kennedy, Breyer, Alito	Kennedy; Ginsburg; Sotomayor
	Leonard v. Texas	580 U.S. ___ (2017)	Due Process Clause • civil forfeiture		
Thomas filed a statement respecting the Court's denial of certiorari.
	Baston v. United States	580 U.S. ___ (2017)	Foreign Commerce Clause • restitution award to victim of extraterritorial sex trafficking		
Thomas dissented from the Court's denial of certiorari.
	NLRB v. SW General, Inc	580 U.S. ___ (2017)	Federal Vacancies Reform Act of 1998		Roberts; Sotomayor
	Manuel v. Joliet	580 U.S. ___ (2017)	Fourth Amendment • unlawful pretrial detention		Kagan; Alito
	Star Athletica, L. L. C. v. Varsity Brands, Inc.	580 U.S. ___ (2017)	copyright law • features incorporated into design of useful articles	Roberts, Alito, Sotomayor, Kagan	Ginsburg; Breyer
	Czyzewski v. Jevic Holding Corp.	580 U.S. ___ (2017)	bankruptcy law • Chapter 11 • Article III standing • creditor priority in structured dismissal	Alito	Breyer
	Coventry Health Care of Mo., Inc. v. Nevils	581 U.S. ___ (2017)	Federal Employees Health Benefits Act of 1959 • state law prohibition of insurance carrier subrogation and reimbursement • federal preemption		Ginsburg
	Manrique v. United States	581 U.S. ___ (2017)	Federal Rules of Appellate Procedure • appeal from amended judgment for restitution	Roberts, Kennedy, Breyer, Alito, Kagan	Ginsburg
	Nelson v. Colorado	581 U.S. ___ (2017)	Fourteenth Amendment • Due Process Clause • refund of fines, costs, and restitution after reversal of conviction		Ginsburg; Alito
	Lewis v. Clarke	581 U.S. ___ (2017)	tribal sovereign immunity • extraterritorial tribal commercial activity		Sotomayor; Ginsburg
	Bank of America Corp. v. Miami	581 U.S. ___ (2017)	Fair Housing Act • municipality as aggrieved person to bring suit	Kennedy, Alito	Breyer
	Howell v. Howell	581 U.S. ___ (2017)	Uniformed Services Former Spouses' Protection Act • indemnification of post-divorce waiver of military retirement pay • federal preemption		Breyer
	Kindred Nursing Centers, L. P. v. Clark	581 U.S. ___ (2017)	Federal Arbitration Act • power of attorney authority to agree to arbitration • federal preemption		Kagan
	TC Heartland LLC v. Kraft Foods Group Brands LLC	581 U.S. ___ (2017)	patent law • venue • corporate residence	Roberts, Kennedy, Ginsburg, Breyer, Alito, Sotomayor, Kagan	
	Cooper v. Harris	581 U.S. ___ (2017)	Fourteenth Amendment • Equal Protection Clause • legislative redistricting on the basis of race • Voting Rights Act		Kagan; Alito
	Esquivel-Quintana v. Sessions	581 U.S. ___ (2017)	Immigration and Nationality Act • removal proceedings for aggravated felony conviction • federal classification of statutory rape	Roberts, Kennedy, Ginsburg, Breyer, Alito, Sotomayor, Kagan	
	Sandoz Inc v. Amgen Inc.	582 U.S. ___ (2017)	Biologics Price Competition and Innovation Act of 2009 • patent law • availability of injunction to enforce biosimilar drug application requirements	Unanimous	Breyer
	Microsoft Corp. v. Baker	582 U.S. ___ (2017)	appealability of denial of class allegations after voluntary dismissal by named plaintiffs	Roberts, Alito	Ginsburg
	Sessions v. Morales-Santana	582 U.S. ___ (2017)	Immigration and Nationality Act • Fifth Amendment • equal protection • citizenship based on physical presence in U.S. of unwed mother or father prior to birth	Alito	Ginsburg
	Ziglar v. Abbasi	582 U.S. ___ (2017)	detentions following the September 11 attacks • Fifth Amendment • Due Process Clause • equal protection • Fourth Amendment • implied cause of action		Kennedy; Breyer
	Matal v. Tam	582 U.S. ___ (2017)	trademark law • First Amendment • free speech • disparaging trademarks		Alito; Kennedy
	Weaver v. Massachusetts	582 U.S. ___ (2017)	Sixth Amendment • public trial violation • ineffective assistance of counsel • preservation of error	Gorsuch	Kennedy; Alito; Breyer
	Jae Lee v. United States	582 U.S. ___ (2017)	Sixth Amendment • ineffective assistance of counsel • effect of conviction on immigration status	Alito (in part)	Roberts
	Murr v. Wisconsin	582 U.S. ___ (2017)	Fourteenth Amendment • regulatory taking • treatment of separate parcels under common ownership		Kennedy; Roberts
	Trinity Lutheran Church of Columbia, Inc. v. Comer	582 U.S. ___ (2017)	First Amendment • Free Exercise Clause • Establishment Clause • eligibility of religious organization for government grant	Gorsuch	Roberts; Breyer; Gorsuch; Sotomayor
	Davila v. Davis	582 U.S. ___ (2017)	Sixth Amendment • ineffective assistance of counsel • procedural default • failure of habeas counsel to raise failure by appellate counsel	Roberts, Kennedy, Alito, Gorsuch	Breyer
	Hernandez v. Mesa	582 U.S. ___ (2017)	Fourth Amendment • cross-border shooting of foreign national by federal law enforcement • implied right of action		per curiam; Breyer
	Trump. v. International Refugee Assistance Project	582 U.S. ___ (2017)	First Amendment • Free Exercise Clause • Executive Order 13780	Alito, Gorsuch	per curiam
	Peruta v. California	582 U.S. ___ (2017)	Second Amendment • gun laws in California • public carrying of firearms	Gorsuch	
Thomas dissented from the Court's denial of certiorari.
