= 2016 term United States Supreme Court opinions of Samuel Alito =

The 2016 term of the Supreme Court of the United States began October 3, 2016, and concluded October 1, 2017. This was the twelfth term of Associate Justice Samuel Alito's tenure on the Court.
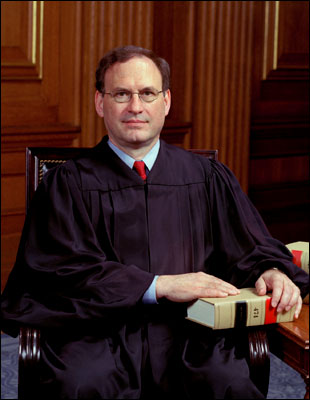

Samuel Alito 2016 term statistics

7	Majority or plurality	8	Concurrence	0	Other
4	Dissent	1	Concurrence/dissent	Total =	20
Bench opinions = 18		Opinions relating to orders = 2		In-chambers opinions = 0
Unanimous opinions: 2		Most joined by: Thomas (14 in full, 1 in part)		Least joined by: Gorsuch (4)

Type	Case	Citation	Issues	Joined by	Other opinions
	Tatum v. Arizona	580 U.S. ___ (2016)	Eighth Amendment • life imprisonment of minors	Thomas	Sotomayor
Alito dissented from the Court's decision to grant, vacate, and remand.
	Salman v. United States	580 U.S. ___ (2016)	securities fraud • Securities Exchange Act of 1934 • SEC Rule 10b-5 • tippee liability for insider trading	Unanimous	
	Life Technologies Corp. v. Promega Corp.	580 U.S. ___ (2017)	patent law • infringement of multicomponent inventions	Thomas	Sotomayor
	Fry v. Napoleon Community Schools	580 U.S. ___ (2017)	Individuals with Disabilities Education Act • exhaustion of remedies • denial of Free Appropriate Public Education	Thomas	Kagan
	Bethune-Hill v. Virginia State Bd. of Elections	580 U.S. ___ (2017)	consideration of race in legislative redistricting • Equal Protection Clause • Voting Rights Act		Kennedy; Thomas
	Pena-Rodriguez v. Colorado	580 U.S. ___ (2017)	Sixth Amendment • racial bias expressed during jury deliberation • no-impeachment rule	Roberts, Thomas	Kennedy; Thomas
	SCA Hygiene Products Aktiebolag v. First Quality Baby Products, LLC	580 U.S. ___ (2017)	patent law • statute of limitations • laches	Roberts, Kennedy, Thomas, Ginsburg, Sotomayor, Kagan	Breyer
	Manuel v. Joliet	580 U.S. ___ (2017)	Fourth Amendment • unlawful pretrial detention	Thomas	Kagan; Thomas
	Nelson v. Colorado	581 U.S. ___ (2017)	Fourteenth Amendment • Due Process Clause • refund of fines, costs, and restitution after reversal of conviction		Ginsburg; Thomas
	Salazar-Limon v. Houston	581 U.S. ___ (2017)	summary judgment • excessive force	Thomas	Sotomayor
Alito concurred in the Court's denial of certiorari.
	Water Splash, Inc. v. Menon	581 U.S. ___ (2017)	service by mail • Hague Service Convention	Roberts, Kennedy, Thomas, Ginsburg, Breyer, Sotomayor, Kagan	
	Cooper v. Harris	581 U.S. ___ (2017)	Fourteenth Amendment • Equal Protection Clause • legislative redistricting on the basis of race • Voting Rights Act	Roberts, Kennedy	Kagan; Thomas
	County of Los Angeles v. Mendez	581 U.S. ___ (2017)	Fourth Amendment • excessive force	Roberts, Kennedy, Thomas, Ginsburg, Breyer, Sotomayor, Kagan	
	Town of Chester v. Laroe Estates, Inc.	581 U.S. ___ (2017)	Article III • standing • intervening plaintiff	Unanimous	
	Packingham v. North Carolina	582 U.S. ___ (2017)	First Amendment • free speech • ban of registered sex offenders from social media sites with minor members	Roberts, Thomas	Kennedy
	McWilliams v. Dunn	582 U.S. ___ (2017)	indigent defendant access to independent mental health expert	Roberts, Thomas, Gorsuch	Breyer
	Matal v. Tam	582 U.S. ___ (2017)	trademark law • First Amendment • free speech • disparaging trademarks	Roberts, Breyer; Kennedy, Thomas, Ginsburg, Sotomayor, Kagan (in part)	Kennedy; Thomas
	Bristol-Myers Squibb Co. v. Superior Court of Cal., San Francisco Cty.	582 U.S. ___ (2017)	Fourteenth Amendment • Due Process Clause • personal jurisdiction • specific jurisdiction	Roberts, Kennedy, Thomas, Ginsburg, Breyer, Kagan, Gorsuch	Sotomayor
	Weaver v. Massachusetts	582 U.S. ___ (2017)	Sixth Amendment • public trial violation • ineffective assistance of counsel • preservation of error	Gorsuch	Kennedy; Thomas; Breyer
	Maslenjak v. United States	582 U.S. ___ (2017)	false statement during naturalization process		Kagan; Gorsuch
