= 2016 term United States Supreme Court opinions of Stephen Breyer =

The 2016 term of the Supreme Court of the United States began October 3, 2016, and concluded October 1, 2017. This was the twenty-third term of Associate Justice Stephen Breyer's tenure on the Court.
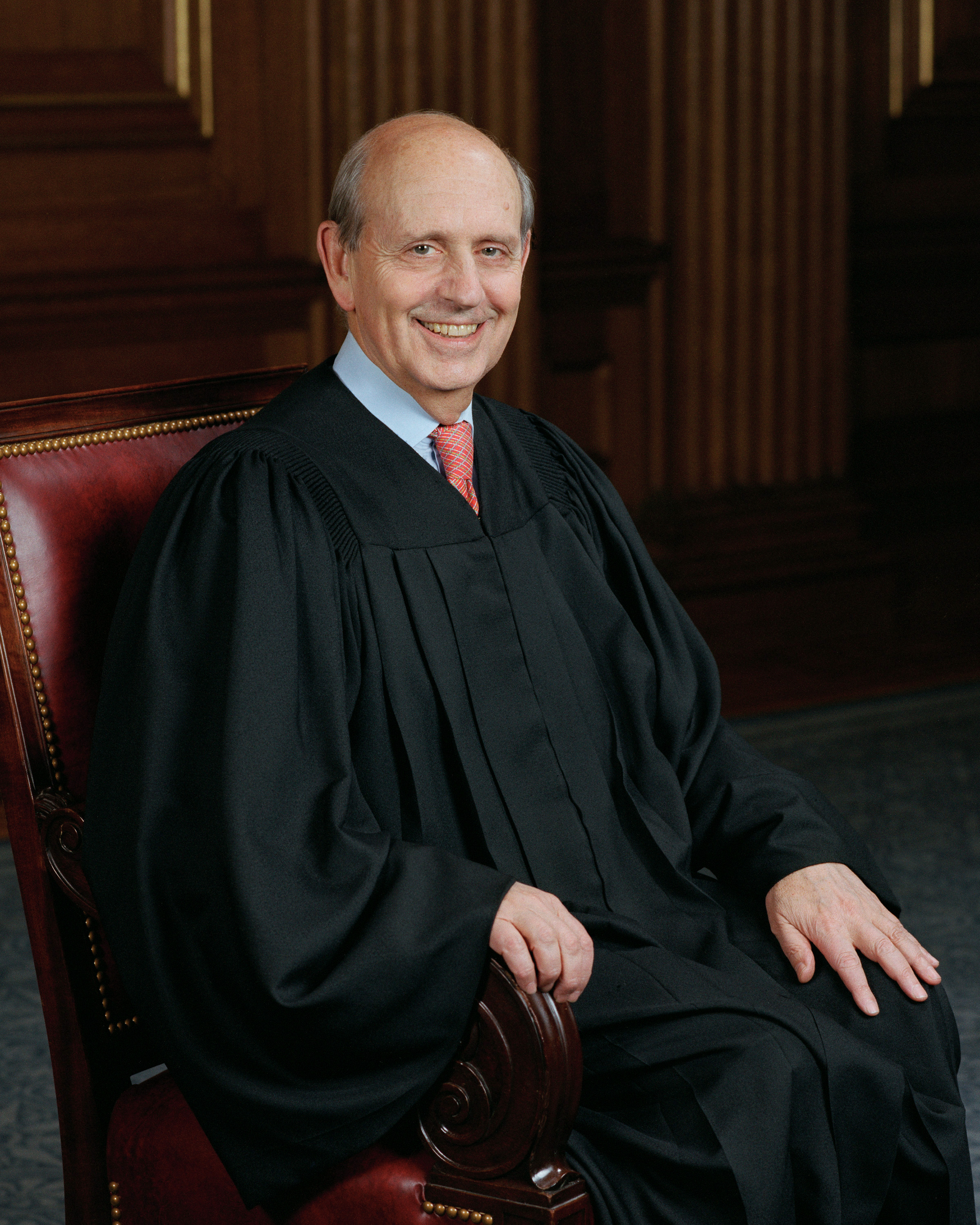

Stephen Breyer 2016 term statistics

8	Majority or plurality	3	Concurrence	1	Other
10	Dissent	0	Concurrence/dissent	Total =	22
Bench opinions = 17		Opinions relating to orders = 5		In-chambers opinions = 0
Unanimous opinions: 1		Most joined by: Ginsburg (9)		Least joined by: Gorsuch (0)

Type	Case	Citation	Issues	Joined by	Other opinions
	Shaw v. United States	580 U.S. ___ (2016)	federal criminal law • bank fraud	Unanimous	
	Sireci v. Florida	580 U.S. ___ (2016)	Eighth Amendment • death penalty		
Breyer dissented from the Court's denial of certiorari.
	Reed v. Louisiana	580 U.S. ___ (2016)	Eighth Amendment • death penalty		
Breyer dissented from the Court's denial of certiorari.
	Ruiz v. Texas	580 U.S. ___ (2016)	Eighth Amendment • death penalty • solitary confinement		
Breyer dissented from the Court's denial of a stay of execution.
	SCA Hygiene Products Aktiebolag v. First Quality Baby Products, LLC	580 U.S. ___ (2017)	patent law • statute of limitations • laches		Alito
	Star Athletica, L. L. C. v. Varsity Brands, Inc.	580 U.S. ___ (2017)	copyright law • features incorporated into design of useful articles	Kennedy	Thomas; Ginsburg
	Czyzewski v. Jevic Holding Corp.	580 U.S. ___ (2017)	bankruptcy law • Chapter 11 • Article III standing • creditor priority in structured dismissal	Roberts, Kennedy, Ginsburg, Sotomayor, Kagan	Thomas
	Expressions Hair Design v. Schneiderman	581 U.S. ___ (2017)	First Amendment • commercial speech • regulation of communication of prices • price difference for credit card transactions		Roberts; Sotomayor
	McGehee v. Hutchinson	581 U.S. ___ (2017)	Eighth Amendment • death penalty • lethal injection		Sotomayor
Breyer dissented from the Court's denial of a stay of execution.
	Smith v. Ryan	581 U.S. ___ (2017)	Eighth Amendment • death penalty • solitary confinement		
Breyer filed a statement respecting the Court's denial of certiorari.
	Bolivarian Republic of Venezuela v. Helmerich & Payne Int'l Drilling Co.	581 U.S. ___ (2017)	Foreign Sovereign Immunities Act • expropriation exception	Roberts, Kennedy, Thomas, Ginsburg, Alito, Sotomayor, Kagan	
	Bank of America Corp. v. Miami	581 U.S. ___ (2017)	Fair Housing Act • municipality as aggrieved person to bring suit	Roberts, Ginsburg, Sotomayor, Kagan	Thomas
	Howell v. Howell	581 U.S. ___ (2017)	Uniformed Services Former Spouses' Protection Act • indemnification for post-divorce waiver of military retirement pay • federal preemption	Roberts, Kennedy, Ginsburg, Alito, Sotomayor, Kagan	Thomas
	Midland Funding, LLC v. Johnson	581 U.S. ___ (2017)	Fair Debt Collection Practices Act • bankruptcy law • filing of obviously time-barred proof of claim	Roberts, Kennedy, Thomas, Alito	Sotomayor
	Sandoz Inc v. Amgen Inc.	582 U.S. ___ (2017)	Biologics Price Competition and Innovation Act of 2009 • patent law • availability of injunction to enforce biosimilar drug application requirements		Thomas
	Ziglar v. Abbasi	582 U.S. ___ (2017)	detentions following the September 11 attacks • Fifth Amendment • Due Process Clause • equal protection • Fourth Amendment • implied cause of action	Ginsburg	Kennedy; Thomas
	McWilliams v. Dunn	582 U.S. ___ (2017)	indigent defendant access to independent mental health expert	Kennedy, Ginsburg, Sotomayor, Kagan	Alito
	Weaver v. Massachusetts	582 U.S. ___ (2017)	Sixth Amendment • public trial violation • ineffective assistance of counsel • preservation of error	Kagan	Kennedy; Thomas; Alito
	Turner v. United States	582 U.S. ___ (2017)	Fourteenth Amendment • Due Process Clause • failure to disclose exculpatory information	Roberts, Kennedy, Thomas, Alito, Sotomayor	Kagan
	Trinity Lutheran Church of Columbia, Inc. v. Comer	582 U.S. ___ (2017)	First Amendment • Free Exercise Clause • Establishment Clause • eligibility of religious organization for government grant		Roberts; Thomas; Gorsuch; Sotomayor
	Davila v. Davis	582 U.S. ___ (2017)	Sixth Amendment • ineffective assistance of counsel • procedural default • failure of habeas counsel to raise failure by appellate counsel	Ginsburg, Sotomayor, Kagan	Thomas
	Hernandez v. Mesa	582 U.S. ___ (2017)	Fourth Amendment • cross-border shooting of foreign national by federal law enforcement	Ginsburg	per curiam; Thomas
