= 2016 term United States Supreme Court opinions of Ruth Bader Ginsburg =

The 2016 term of the Supreme Court of the United States began October 3, 2016, and concluded October 1, 2017. This was the twenty-fourth term of Associate Justice Ruth Bader Ginsburg's tenure on the Court.
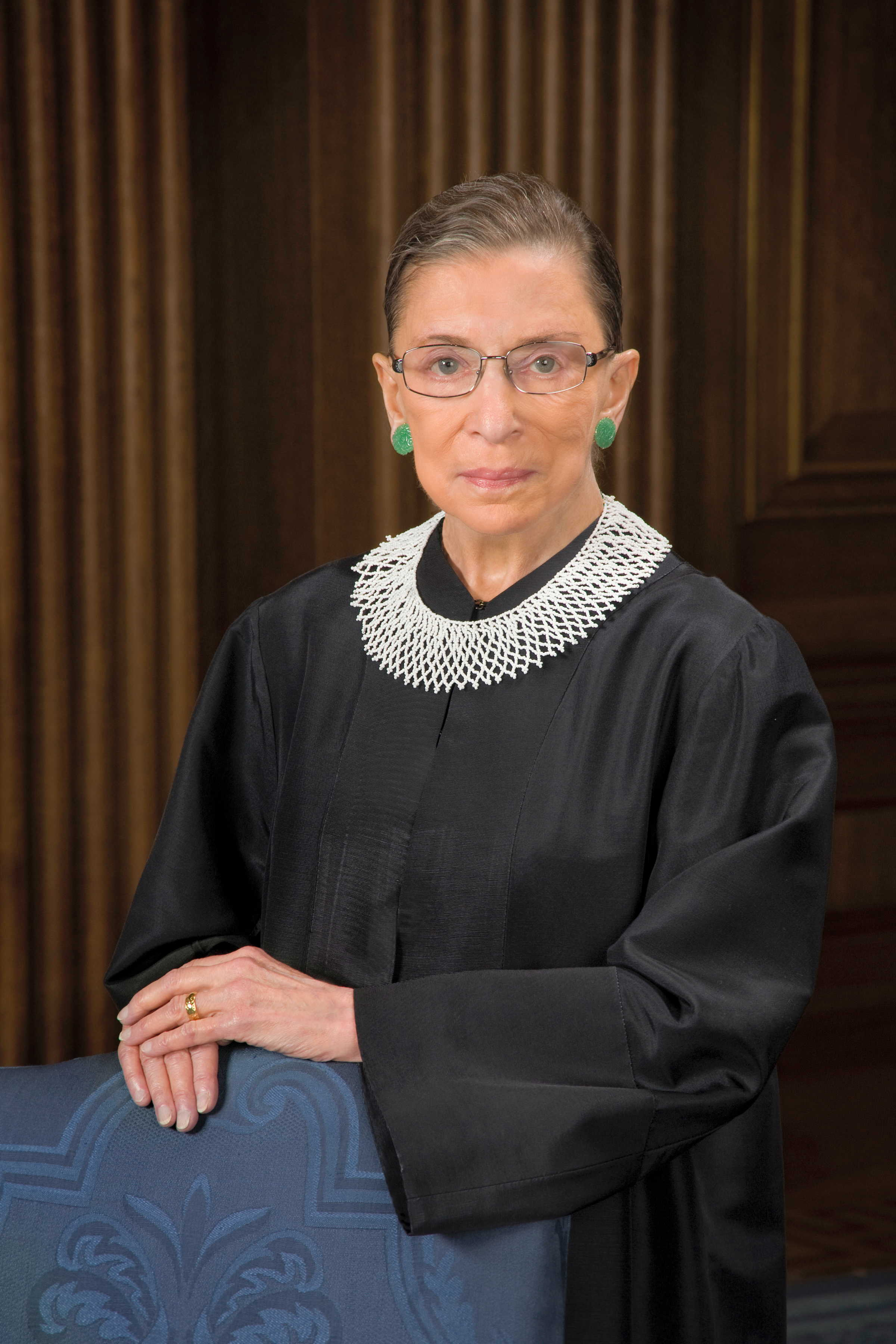

Ruth Bader Ginsburg 2016 term statistics

8	Majority or plurality	5	Concurrence	0	Other
2	Dissent	2	Concurrence/dissent	Total =	17
Bench opinions = 17		Opinions relating to orders = 0		In-chambers opinions = 0
Unanimous opinions: 1		Most joined by: Breyer, Sotomayor, Kagan (9)		Least joined by: Gorsuch (1)

Type	Case	Citation	Issues	Joined by	Other opinions
	Bravo-Fernandez v. United States	580 U.S. 5 (2016)	Double Jeopardy Clause • issue preclusion	Unanimous	Thomas
	White v. Pauly	580 U.S. 81 (2017)	Fourth Amendment to the United States Constitution • qualified immunity		per curiam
	Beckles v. United States	580 U.S. 897 (2017)	Federal Sentencing Guidelines • residual clause • Due Process Clause • void for vagueness doctrine		Thomas; Kennedy; Sotomayor
	Star Athletica, L. L. C. v. Varsity Brands, Inc.	580 U.S. 1019 (2017)	copyright law • features incorporated into design of useful articles		Thomas; Breyer
	Moore v. Texas	581 U.S. ___ (2017)	Eighth Amendment • death penalty • determination of intellectual disability	Kennedy, Breyer, Sotomayor, Kagan	Roberts
	McLane Co. v. EEOC	581 U.S. ___ (2017)	EEOC subpoenas • standard of review of district court order to quash		Sotomayor
	Coventry Health Care of Mo., Inc. v. Nevils	581 U.S. ___ (2017)	Federal Employees Health Benefits Act of 1959 • state law prohibition of insurance carrier subrogation and reimbursement • federal preemption	Roberts, Kennedy, Thomas, Breyer, Alito, Sotomayor, Kagan	Thomas
	Manrique v. United States	581 U.S. ___ (2017)	Federal Rules of Appellate Procedure • appeal from amended judgment for restitution	Sotomayor	Thomas
	Nelson v. Colorado	581 U.S. ___ (2017)	Fourteenth Amendment • Due Process Clause • refund of fines, costs, and restitution after reversal of conviction	Roberts, Kennedy, Breyer, Sotomayor, Kagan	Alito; Thomas
	Lewis v. Clarke	581 U.S. ___ (2017)	tribal sovereign immunity • lawsuit against tribal employee as individual		Sotomayor; Thomas
	Impression Products, Inc. v. Lexmark Int'l, Inc.	581 U.S. ___ (2017)	patent law • patent exhaustion • parallel imports		Roberts
	BNSF R. Co. v. Tyrrell	581 U.S. ___ (2017)	Federal Employers' Liability Act • personal jurisdiction over railroads • Fourteenth Amendment • Due Process Clause	Roberts, Kennedy, Thomas, Breyer, Alito, Kagan, Gorsuch	Sotomayor
	Microsoft Corp. v. Baker	582 U.S. ___ (2017)	appealability of denial of class allegations after voluntary dismissal by named plaintiffs	Kennedy, Breyer, Sotomayor, Kagan	Thomas
	Sessions v. Morales-Santana	582 U.S. ___ (2017)	Immigration and Nationality Act • Fifth Amendment • equal protection • citizenship based on physical presence in U.S. of unwed mother or father prior to birth	Roberts, Kennedy, Breyer, Sotomayor, Kagan	Thomas
	Virginia v. LeBlanc	582 U.S. ___ (2017)	geriatric release of juvenile offenders • Eighth Amendment • cruel and unusual punishment • sentencing of juveniles to life imprisonment for nonhomicide crimes		per curiam
	Perry v. Merit Systems Protection Board	582 U.S. ___ (2017)	Civil Service Reform Act of 1978 • employment discrimination • review of dismissal by Merit Systems Protection Board	Roberts, Kennedy, Breyer, Alito, Sotomayor, Kagan	Gorsuch
	California Public Employees' Retirement System v. ANZ Securities, Inc.	582 U.S. ___ (2017)	securities fraud • Securities Act of 1933 • underwriter liability • statute of limitations	Breyer, Sotomayor, Kagan	Kennedy
