= 2016 term United States Supreme Court opinions of Anthony Kennedy =

The 2016 term of the Supreme Court of the United States began October 3, 2016, and concluded October 1, 2017. This was the thirtieth term of Associate Justice Anthony Kennedy's tenure on the Court.
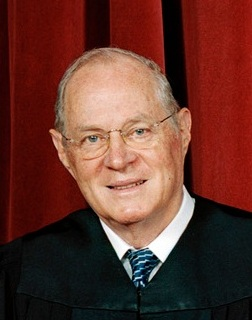

Anthony Kennedy 2016 term statistics

8	Majority or plurality	2	Concurrence	0	Other
0	Dissent	0	Concurrence/dissent	Total =	10
Bench opinions = 10		Opinions relating to orders = 0		In-chambers opinions = 0
Unanimous opinions: 1		Most joined by: Ginsburg, Sotomayor (7)		Least joined by: Gorsuch (2)

Type	Case	Citation	Issues	Joined by	Other opinions
	State Farm Fire & Casualty Co. v. United States ex rel. Rigsby	580 U.S. ___ (2016)	False Claims Act • requirement to file complaint under seal	Unanimous	
	Bethune-Hill v. Virginia State Bd. of Elections	580 U.S. ___ (2017)	consideration of race in legislative redistricting • Equal Protection Clause • Voting Rights Act	Roberts, Ginsburg, Breyer, Sotomayor, Kagan	Alito; Thomas
	Pena-Rodriguez v. Colorado	580 U.S. ___ (2017)	Sixth Amendment • racial bias expressed during jury deliberation • no-impeachment rule	Ginsburg, Breyer, Sotomayor, Kagan	Thomas; Alito
	Beckles v. United States	580 U.S. ___ (2017)	Federal Sentencing Guidelines • residual clause • Due Process Clause • void for vagueness doctrine		Thomas; Ginsburg; Sotomayor
	Packingham v. North Carolina	582 U.S. ___ (2017)	First Amendment • free speech • ban of registered sex offenders from social media sites with minor members	Ginsburg, Breyer, Sotomayor, Kagan	Alito
	Ziglar v. Abbasi	582 U.S. ___ (2017)	detentions following the September 11 attacks • Fifth Amendment • Due Process Clause • equal protection • Fourth Amendment • implied cause of action	Roberts, Alito; Thomas (in part)	Thomas; Breyer
	Matal v. Tam	582 U.S. ___ (2017)	trademark law • First Amendment • free speech • disparaging trademarks	Ginsburg, Sotomayor, Kagan	Alito; Thomas
	Weaver v. Massachusetts	582 U.S. ___ (2017)	Sixth Amendment • public trial violation • ineffective assistance of counsel • preservation of error	Roberts, Thomas, Ginsburg, Sotomayor, Gorsuch	Thomas; Alito; Breyer
	Murr v. Wisconsin	582 U.S. ___ (2017)	Fourteenth Amendment • regulatory taking • treatment of separate parcels under common ownership	Ginsburg, Breyer, Sotomayor, Kagan	Roberts; Thomas
	California Public Employees' Retirement System v. ANZ Securities, Inc.	582 U.S. ___ (2017)	securities fraud • Securities Act of 1933 • underwriter liability • statute of limitations	Roberts, Thomas, Alito, Gorsuch	Ginsburg
