= 2016 term United States Supreme Court opinions of Sonia Sotomayor =

The 2016 term of the Supreme Court of the United States began October 3, 2016, and concluded October 1, 2017. This was the eighth term of Associate Justice Sonia Sotomayor's tenure on the Court.
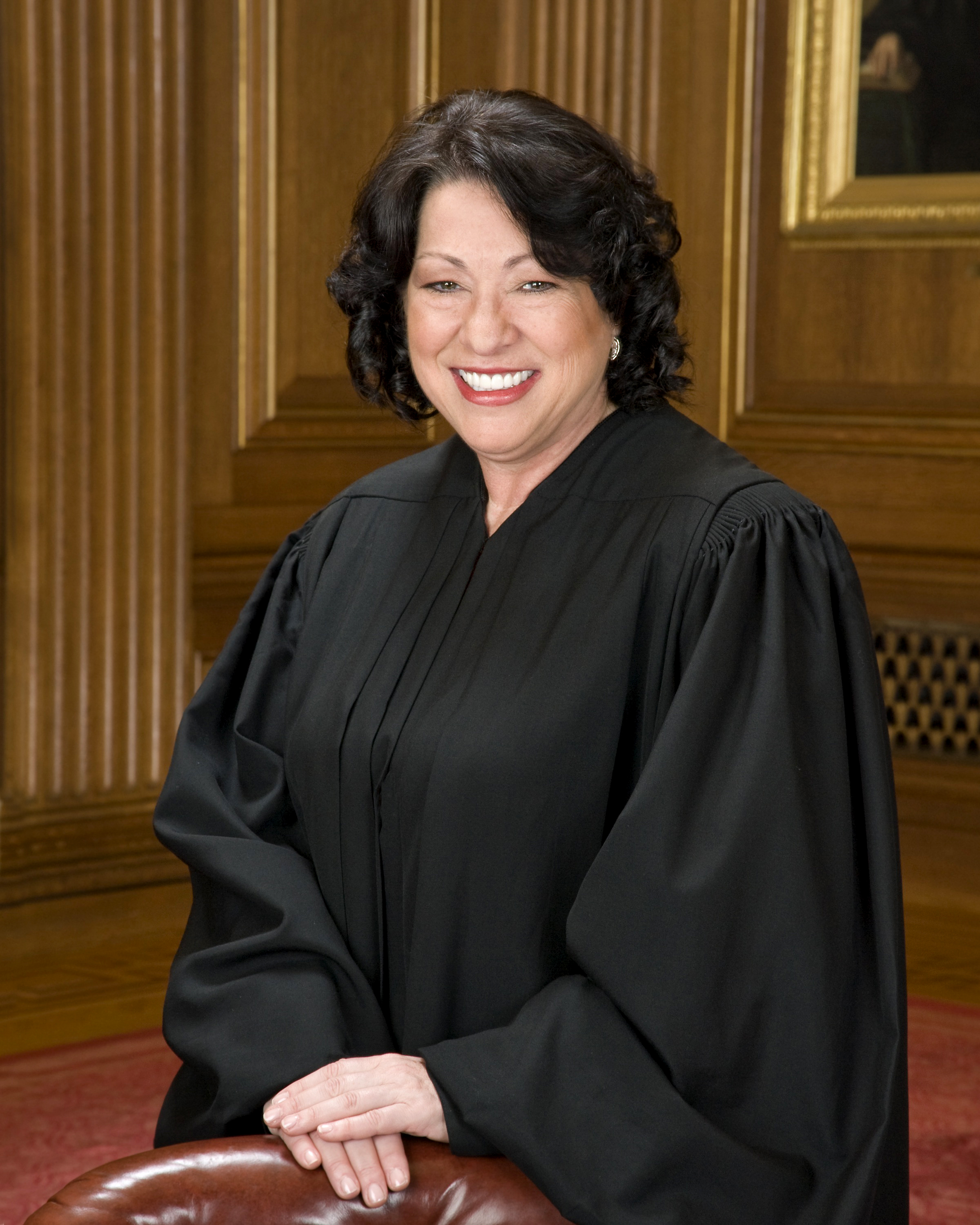

Sonia Sotomayor 2016 term statistics

7	Majority or plurality	5	Concurrence	1	Other
10	Dissent	1	Concurrence/dissent	Total =	24
Bench opinions = 15		Opinions relating to orders = 9		In-chambers opinions = 0
Unanimous opinions: 3		Most joined by: Ginsburg (11)		Least joined by: Gorsuch (1)

Type	Case	Citation	Issues	Joined by	Other opinions
	Elmore v. Holbrook	580 U.S. 938 (2016)	Sixth Amendment • ineffective assistance of counsel • death penalty • mitigating factors at sentencing	Ginsburg	
Sotomayor dissented from the Court's denial of certiorari.
	Tatum v. Arizona	580 U.S. 952 (2016)	Eighth Amendment • life imprisonment of minors		Alito
Sotomayor concurred in the Court's decision to grant, vacate, and remand.
	Samsung Electronics Co. v. Apple Inc.	580 U.S. 53 (2016)	patent law • relevant article of manufacture in multicomponent product for determining damages	Unanimous	
	Lightfoot v. Cendant Mortgage Corp.	580 U.S. 82 (2017)	Federal National Mortgage Association • sue-and-be-sued clause • federal jurisdiction	Unanimous	
	Arthur v. Dunn	580 U.S. 1141 (2017)	Eighth Amendment • death penalty • lethal injection	Breyer	
	Life Technologies Corp. v. Promega Corp.	580 U.S. 140 (2017)	patent law • infringement of multicomponent inventions	Kennedy, Ginsburg, Breyer, Kagan; Thomas, Alito (in part)	Alito
	Beckles v. United States	580 U.S. ___ (2017)	Federal Sentencing Guidelines • residual clause • Due Process Clause • void for vagueness doctrine		Thomas; Kennedy; Ginsburg
	Perez v. Florida	580 U.S. ___ (2017)	First Amendment • threatening speech		
Sotomayor concurred in the Court's denial of certiorari.
	NLRB v. SW General, Inc	580 U.S. ___ (2017)	Federal Vacancies Reform Act of 1998	Ginsburg	Roberts; Thomas
	Expressions Hair Design v. Schneiderman	581 U.S. ___ (2017)	First Amendment • commercial speech • regulation of communication of prices • price difference for credit card transactions	Alito	Roberts; Breyer
	McLane Co. v. EEOC	581 U.S. ___ (2017)	EEOC subpoenas • standard of review of district court order to quash	Roberts, Kennedy, Thomas, Breyer, Alito, Kagan	Ginsburg
	McGehee v. Hutchinson	581 U.S. ___ (2017)	Eighth Amendment • death penalty • lethal injection		Breyer
Sotomayor dissented from the Court's denial of a stay and of certiorari.
	Salazar-Limon v. Houston	581 U.S. ___ (2017)	summary judgment • excessive force	Ginsburg	Alito
Sotomayor dissented from the Court's denial of certiorari.
	Lewis v. Clarke	581 U.S. ___ (2017)	tribal sovereign immunity • lawsuit against tribal employee as individual	Roberts, Kennedy, Breyer, Alito, Kagan	Thomas; Ginsburg
	Midland Funding, LLC v. Johnson	581 U.S. ___ (2017)	Fair Debt Collection Practices Act • bankruptcy law • filing of obviously time-barred proof of claim	Ginsburg, Kagan	Breyer
	Arthur v. Dunn	581 U.S. ___ (2017)	Eighth Amendment • death penalty • lethal injection		
Sotomayor dissented from the Court's denial of an application for a stay of execution and of certiorari.
	BNSF R. Co. v. Tyrrell	581 U.S. ___ (2017)	Federal Employers' Liability Act • personal jurisdiction over railroads • Fourteenth Amendment • Due Process Clause		Ginsburg
	Honeycutt v. United States	581 U.S. ___ (2017)	Comprehensive Forfeiture Act of 1984 • liability of co-conspirators	Roberts, Kennedy, Thomas, Ginsburg, Breyer, Alito, Kagan	
	Kokesh v. SEC	581 U.S. ___ (2017)	SEC disgorgement • statute of limitations	Unanimous	
	Advocate Health Care Network v. Stapleton	581 U.S. ___ (2017)	Employee Retirement Income Security Act of 1974 • church plans		Kagan
	Bristol-Myers Squibb Co. v. Superior Court of Cal., San Francisco Cty.	582 U.S. ___ (2017)	Fourteenth Amendment • Due Process Clause • personal jurisdiction • specific jurisdiction		Alito
	Trinity Lutheran Church of Columbia, Inc. v. Comer	582 U.S. ___ (2017)	First Amendment • Free Exercise Clause • Establishment Clause • eligibility of religious organization for government grant	Ginsburg	Roberts; Thomas; Breyer; Gorsuch
	Mathis v. Shulkin	582 U.S. ___ (2017)	Board of Veterans' Appeals • presumption of competence of medical examiners rendering opinion against claim		Gorsuch
Sotomayor filed a statement respecting the Court's denial of certiorari.
	Otte v. Morgan	582 U.S. ___ (2017)	Eighth Amendment • death penalty	Ginsburg	
Sotomayor dissented from the Court's denial of a stay and of certiorari.
