= 2016 term United States Supreme Court opinions of John Roberts =

The 2016 term of the Supreme Court of the United States began October 3, 2016, and concluded October 1, 2017. This was the twelfth term of Chief Justice John Roberts's tenure on the Court.
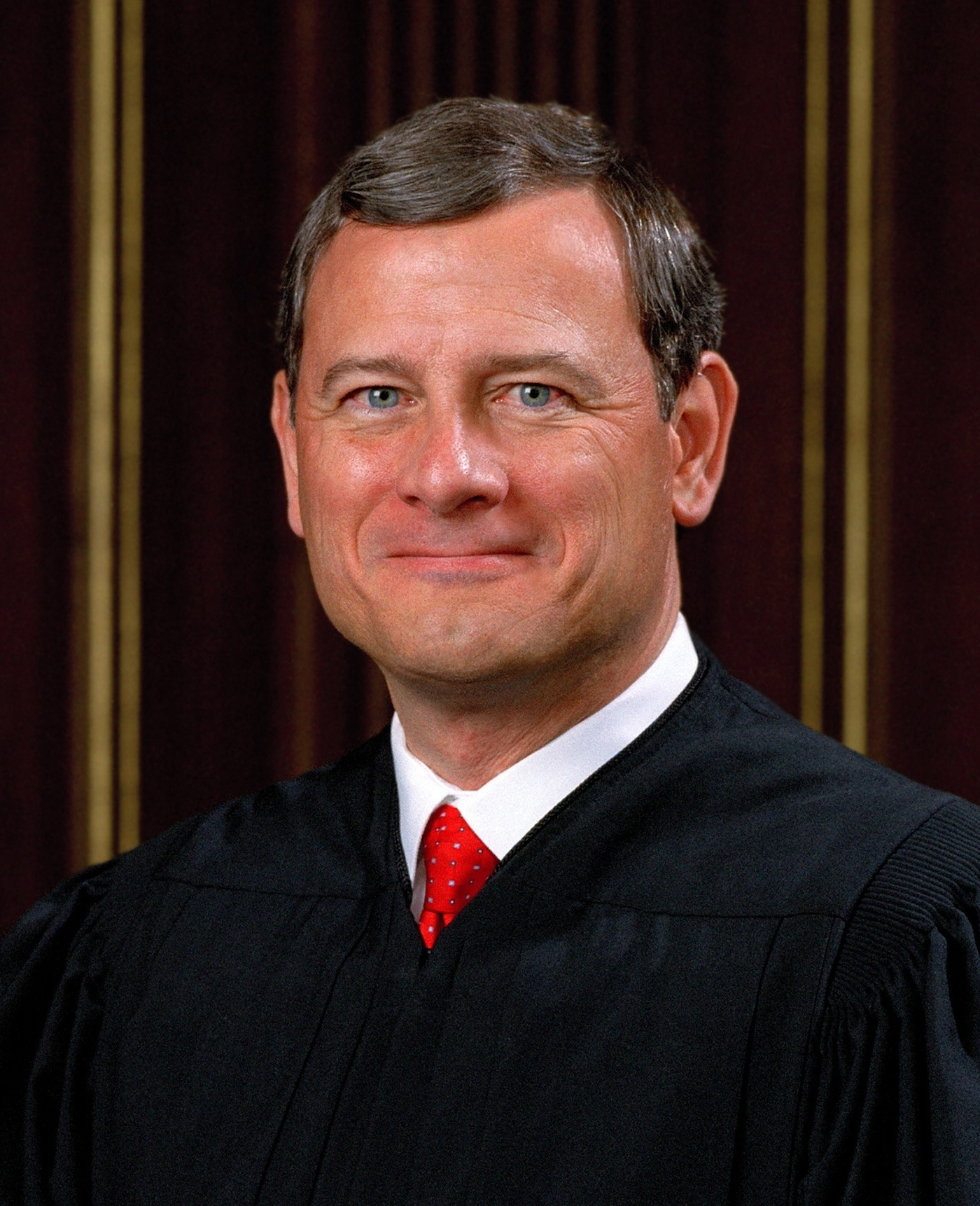

John Roberts 2016 term statistics

8	Majority or plurality	0	Concurrence	2	Other
3	Dissent	0	Concurrence/dissent	Total =	13
Bench opinions = 10		Opinions relating to orders = 3		In-chambers opinions = 0
Unanimous opinions: 2		Most joined by: Thomas (8 in full, 1 in part)		Least joined by: Gorsuch (1 in part)

Type	Case	Citation	Issues	Joined by	Other opinions
	Abbott v. Veasey	580 U.S. ___ (2017)	voter identification laws • Voting Rights Act		
Roberts filed a statement respecting the Court's denial of certiorari.
	Buck v. Davis	580 U.S. ___ (2017)	certificate of appealability • Sixth Amendment • ineffective assistance of counsel • jury consideration of race in imposing death penalty	Kennedy, Ginsburg, Breyer, Sotomayor, Kagan	Thomas
	NLRB v. SW General, Inc	580 U.S. ___ (2017)	Federal Vacancies Reform Act of 1998	Kennedy, Thomas, Breyer, Alito, Kagan	Thomas; Sotomayor
	Endrew F. v. Douglas County School Dist. RE–1	580 U.S. ___ (2017)	Individuals with Disabilities Education Act • Free Appropriate Public Education • individualized education program	Unanimous	
	Moore v. Texas	581 U.S. ___ (2017)	Eighth Amendment • death penalty • determination of intellectual disability	Thomas, Alito	Ginsburg
	Expressions Hair Design v. Schneiderman	581 U.S. ___ (2017)	First Amendment • commercial speech • regulation of communication of prices • price difference for credit card transactions	Kennedy, Thomas, Ginsburg, Kagan	Breyer; Sotomayor
	Dean v. United States	581 U.S. ___ (2017)	federal criminal law • mandatory minimum sentence for use of firearm in violent crime • calculation of sentence for predicate offense	Unanimous	
	North Carolina v. North Carolina State Conference of NAACP	581 U.S. ___ (2017)	voter identification laws • standing		
Roberts filed a statement respecting the Court's denial of certiorari.
	Impression Products, Inc. v. Lexmark Int'l, Inc.	581 U.S. ___ (2017)	patent law • patent exhaustion • parallel imports	Kennedy, Thomas, Breyer, Alito, Sotomayor, Kagan	Ginsburg
	Jae Lee v. United States	582 U.S. ___ (2017)	Sixth Amendment • ineffective assistance of counsel • effect of conviction on immigration status	Kennedy, Ginsburg, Breyer, Sotomayor, Kagan	Thomas
	Murr v. Wisconsin	582 U.S. ___ (2017)	Fourteenth Amendment • regulatory taking • treatment of separate parcels under common ownership	Thomas, Alito	Kennedy; Thomas
	Trinity Lutheran Church of Columbia, Inc. v. Comer	582 U.S. ___ (2017)	First Amendment • Free Exercise Clause • Establishment Clause • eligibility of religious organization for government grant	Kennedy, Alito, Kagan; Thomas, Gorsuch, in part	Thomas; Breyer; Gorsuch; Sotomayor
	Hicks v. United States	582 U.S. ___ (2017)	plain error review	Thomas	Gorsuch
Roberts dissented from the Court's summary vactur and remand.
