= 2016 term United States Supreme Court opinions of Elena Kagan =

The 2016 term of the Supreme Court of the United States began October 3, 2016, and concluded October 1, 2017. This was the seventh term of Associate Justice Elena Kagan's tenure on the Court.
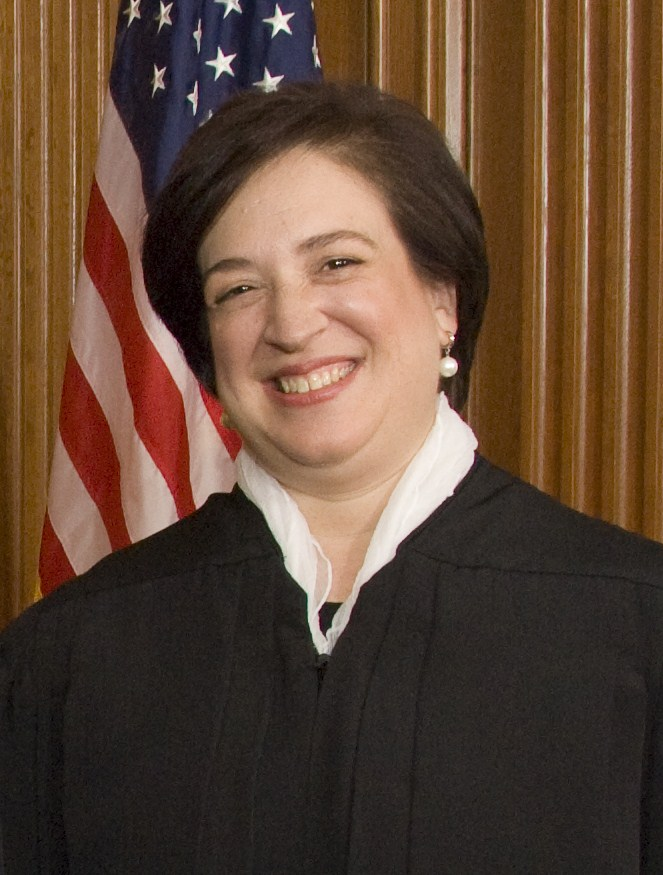

Elena Kagan 2016 term statistics

7	Majority or plurality	0	Concurrence	0	Other
1	Dissent	0	Concurrence/dissent	Total =	8
Bench opinions = 8		Opinions relating to orders = 0		In-chambers opinions = 0
Unanimous opinions: 0		Most joined by: Ginsburg (8)		Least joined by: Gorsuch (0)

Type	Case	Citation	Issues	Joined by	Other opinions
	Fry v. Napoleon Community Schools	580 U.S. 154 (2017)	Individuals with Disabilities Education Act • exhaustion of remedies • denial of Free Appropriate Public Education	Roberts, Kennedy, Ginsburg, Breyer, Sotomayor	Alito
	Manuel v. Joliet	580 U.S. ___ (2017)	Fourth Amendment • unlawful pretrial detention	Roberts, Kennedy, Ginsburg, Breyer, Sotomayor	Thomas; Alito
	Goodyear Tire & Rubber Co. v. Haeger	581 U.S. ___ (2017)	inherent power of district court to sanction bad faith conduct • award of legal fees	Roberts, Kennedy, Thomas, Ginsburg, Breyer, Alito, Sotomayor	
	Kindred Nursing Centers, L. P. v. Clark	581 U.S. ___ (2017)	Federal Arbitration Act • power of attorney authority to agree to arbitration • federal preemption	Roberts, Kennedy, Ginsburg, Breyer, Alito, Sotomayor	Thomas
	Cooper v. Harris	581 U.S. ___ (2017)	Fourteenth Amendment • Equal Protection Clause • legislative redistricting on the basis of race • Voting Rights Act	Thomas, Ginsburg, Breyer, Sotomayor	Thomas; Alito
	Advocate Health Care Network v. Stapleton	581 U.S. ___ (2017)	Employee Retirement Income Security Act of 1974 • church plans	Roberts, Kennedy, Thomas, Ginsburg, Breyer, Alito, Sotomayor	Sotomayor
	Turner v. United States	582 U.S. ___ (2017)	Fourteenth Amendment • Due Process Clause • failure to disclose exculpatory information	Ginsburg	Breyer
	Maslenjak v. United States	582 U.S. ___ (2017)	false statement during naturalization process	Roberts, Kennedy, Ginsburg, Breyer, Sotomayor	Alito; Gorsuch
