= 2016 term United States Supreme Court opinions of Neil Gorsuch =

The 2016 term of the Supreme Court of the United States began October 3, 2016, and concluded October 1, 2017. This was the first term of Associate Justice Neil Gorsuch's tenure on the Court.
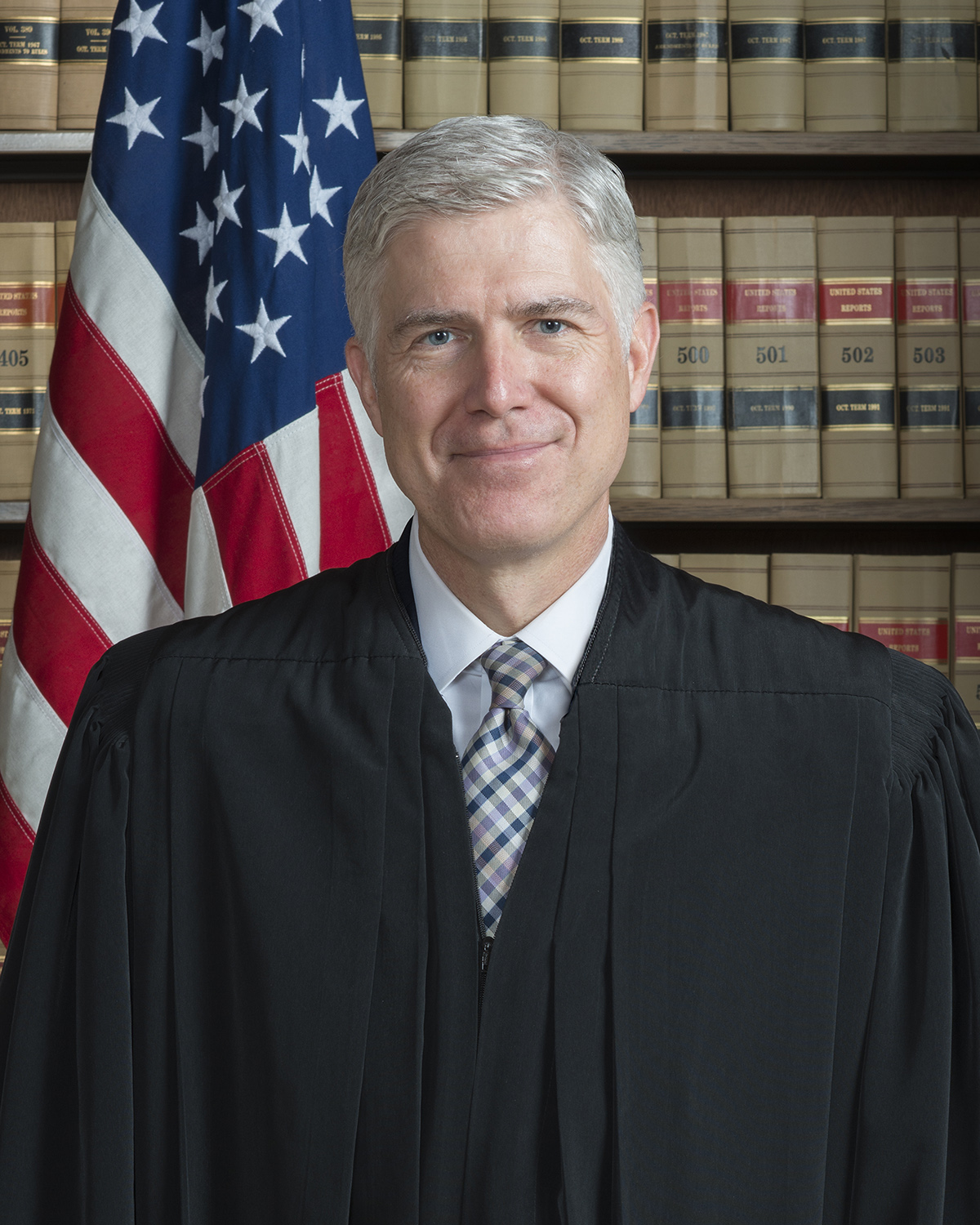

Neil Gorsuch 2016 term statistics

1	Majority or plurality	3	Concurrence	1	Other
3	Dissent	0	Concurrence/dissent	Total =	8
Bench opinions = 5		Opinions relating to orders = 3		In-chambers opinions = 0
Unanimous opinions: 1		Most joined by: Thomas (6)		Least joined by: Roberts, Kennedy, Ginsburg, Breyer, Sotomayor, Kagan (1)

Type	Case	Citation	Issues	Joined by	Other opinions
	Henson v. Santander Consumer USA Inc.	582 U.S. ___ (2017)	debt collection • Fair Debt Collection Practices Act	Unanimous	
	Maslenjak v. United States	582 U.S. ___ (2017)	false statement during naturalization process	Thomas	Kagan; Alito
	Perry v. Merit Systems Protection Board	582 U.S. ___ (2017)	Civil Service Reform Act of 1978 • employment discrimination • review of dismissal by Merit Systems Protection Board	Thomas	Ginsburg
	Trinity Lutheran Church of Columbia, Inc. v. Comer	582 U.S. ___ (2017)	First Amendment • Free Exercise Clause • Establishment Clause • eligibility of religious organization for government grant	Thomas	Roberts; Thomas; Breyer; Sotomayor
	Pavan v. Smith	582 U.S. ___ (2017)	Fourteenth Amendment • same-sex marriage • legal parentage of children conceived through in vitro fertilization	Thomas, Alito	per curiam
	Hicks v. United States	582 U.S. ___ (2017)	plain error review		Roberts
Gorsuch concurred in the Court's summary vacatur and remand.
	Mathis v. Shulkin	582 U.S. ___ (2017)	Board of Veterans' Appeals • presumption of competence of medical examiners rendering opinion against claim		Sotomayor
Gorsuch dissented from the Court's denial of certiorari.
	Bay Point Properties, Inc. v. Mississippi Transportation Commission	582 U.S. ___ (2017)	Takings Clause • statutory limit on compensation for State-held easement	Thomas	
Gorsuch filed a statement respecting the Court's denial of certiorari.
