= Petrella v. Metro-Goldwyn-Mayer, Inc. =

- Supreme Court of the United States

Argued January 21, 2014 Decided May 19, 2014
- Full case name: Paula Petrella, Petitioner v. Metro-Goldwyn-Mayer, Inc., et al.
- Docket no.: 12-1315
- Citations: 572 U.S. 663 (more) 134 S. Ct. 1962; 188 L. Ed. 2d 979; 110 U.S.P.Q.2d 1605
- Argument: Oral argument
- Opinion announcement: Opinion announcement

Case history
- Prior: Petrella v. Metro-Goldwyn-Mayer, Inc., 695 F.3d 946 (9th Cir. 2012), cert. granted, 570 U.S. 948 (2013).

Holding
- Laches cannot be invoked as a bar to a pursuit of a claim for damages brought within the three-year window provided by 17 U.S.C. § 507(b). Because laches is an equitable doctrine, it can have no role in determining the timeliness of an action for damages.

Court membership
- Chief Justice John Roberts Associate Justices Antonin Scalia · Anthony Kennedy; Clarence Thomas · Ruth Bader Ginsburg; Stephen Breyer · Samuel Alito; Sonia Sotomayor · Elena Kagan

Case opinions
- Majority: Ginsburg, joined by Scalia, Thomas, Alito, Sotomayor, Kagan
- Dissent: Breyer, joined by Roberts, Kennedy

Laws applied
- Copyright Act of 1976

Petrella v. Metro-Goldwyn-Mayer, Inc., 572 U.S. 663 (2014), is a United States Supreme Court copyright decision in which the Court held 6-3 that the equitable defense of laches is not available to copyright defendants in claims for damages.

== Background ==
After retiring from the boxing ring, Jake LaMotta collaborated with his friend Frank Petrella to write a story about his career. That collaboration resulted in three copyrighted works:

- a screenplay written in 1963
- a screenplay written in 1973
- the book Raging Bull: My Story, published in 1970.

In 1976, LaMotta and Petrella assigned the copyrights in their works, including renewal rights, to Chartoff-Winkler Productions, Inc., which assigned them in 1978 to United Artists Corporation, which later became a subsidiary of Metro-Goldwyn-Mayer (MGM) in 1981. As a result of its merger with United Artists, MGM obtained the rights to the 1980 film Raging Bull, which achieved popular and critical success.

Petrella died in 1981, during the initial terms in the three original works. Because of the ruling in Stewart v. Abend, the renewal rights reverted to his heirs. In 1991, Petrella's daughter Paula sought to renew the copyrights but was able to file timely only with respect to the 1963 screenplay. In 1998, her attorney informed MGM of that status and advised that exploitation of any derivative work, including the film, infringed on that copyright.

After several years of negotiations and litigation threats, Petrella commenced a copyright infringement claim against MGM in the United States District Court for the Central District of California, seeking monetary and injunctive relief but only with respect to the immediately preceding three years, as provided by 17 U.S.C. § 507(b). MGM moved for summary judgment, arguing that under the equitable doctrine of laches, Petrella's 18-year delay in filing suit was unreasonable and prejudicial to MGM. The District Court granted MGM's motion, holding that laches barred Petrella's complaint. The judgment was later affirmed by the United States Court of Appeals for the Ninth Circuit, citing its previous jurisprudence in the matter.

Because of conflicting opinions in the various Circuit courts on the subject, the Supreme Court granted certiorari to resolve the matter.

== Decision ==
The Ninth Circuit's ruling was reversed and remanded. In a 6–3 ruling, Justice Ginsburg declared that laches cannot be invoked as a bar to pursuing a claim for damages brought within §507(b)'s three-year window. However, in extraordinary circumstances, laches may curtail the relief equitably awarded at the very outset of litigation,

Laches has a restricted scope in law for the following reasons:

- Its principal application was and is to claims of an equitable cast for which the legislature has provided no fixed time limitation. In the case, §507(b)'s three-year window provides for such a limitation. In addition, the Court has cautioned against invoking laches to bar legal relief.
- The Court has never applied laches to bar, in their entirety, claims for discrete wrongs occurring within a federally-prescribed limitations period.
- While equitable tolling, which lengthens the time for commencing a civil action in appropriate circumstances, applies when there is a statute of limitations, laches originally served as a guide when no statute of limitations controlled the claim, and it cannot be described as a rule of statutory interpretation.
- §507(b) allows a copyright owner to defer a suit until the value of litigation is determined. The owner will miss out on damages for periods prior to the three-year look-back, but the right to prospective injunctive relief should in most cases remain unaltered.
- Although MGM pointed out the danger that evidence needed or useful to defend against liability will be lost during a copyright owner's inaction, Congress must have been aware that the passage of time and the author's death could cause a loss or dilution of evidence. Congress chose nonetheless to give the author's family "a second chance to obtain fair remuneration."
- When a copyright owner engages in intentionally-misleading representations on his abstention from suit and the alleged infringer detrimentally relies on the copyright owner's deception, the doctrine of estoppel may bar the copyright owner's claims completely, eliminating all potential remedies.

== Dissenting opinion ==
In dissent, Justice Breyer stated that laches was available as a remedy because when Congress enacted a uniform statute of limitations for copyright claims in 1957, it did not indicate that it also sought to bar the operation of laches: "The Copyright Act is silent on the subject. And silence is consistent, not inconsistent, with the application of equitable doctrines."

== Aftermath ==
Writing for Forbes, Daniel Fisher wrote that artists and heirs will now need to be vigilant as to how their copyrights are being exploited and that film studios and other developers of derivative works will need to be diligent in examining the title to copyrighted material.

MGM settled with Petrella in 2015.

The Supreme Court applied this precedent to patents in SCA Hygiene Products Aktiebolag v. First Quality Baby Products, LLC, holding that laches was not available as a defense to patent infringement within the statute of limitations period under the Patent Act.
