= List of United States Supreme Court cases, volume 580 =

This is a list of all the United States Supreme Court cases from volume 580 of the United States Reports:

Case name	Docket no.	Date decided
Bosse v. Oklahoma	580 U.S. 1	October 11, 2016
The Oklahoma court erred in ruling that Payne v. Tennessee (1991) "implicitly overruled" Booth v. Maryland (1987) in regards to the victim's family members' testimony of the defendant(s) and opinion(s) of the sentence. Payne did not specifically state this, and only the Supreme Court can overrule its own precedent.
Bravo-Fernandez v. United States	580 U.S. 5	November 29, 2016
The issue-preclusion component of the Double Jeopardy Clause does not bar the Government from retrying defendants, like petitioners, after a jury has returned irreconcilably inconsistent verdicts of conviction and acquittal and the convictions are later vacated for legal error unrelated to the inconsistency.
State Farm Fire & Casualty Co. v. United States ex rel. Rigsby	580 U.S. 26	December 6, 2016
A violation of the False Claim Act's seal requirement does not require the dismissal of a complaint.
Salman v. United States	580 U.S. 39	December 6, 2016
Under Dirks v. SEC, the jury could infer that the tipper here personally benefited from making a gift of confidential information to a trading relative.
Samsung Elec. Co. v. Apple Inc.	580 U.S. 53	December 6, 2016
The "article of manufacture," as used in Patent Act provision governing damages for design patent infringement, encompasses both a product sold to a consumer and a component of that product, and components of the infringing smartphones could be the relevant "article of manufacture," although consumers could not purchase those components separately from the smartphones.
Shaw v. United States	580 U.S. 63	December 12, 2016
a scheme to defraud customers also deprives the bank of money in which the bank held a "property right", and criminal defendants may therefore be convicted under the federal statute for schemes to defraud bank customers.
White v. Pauly	580 U.S. 73	January 9, 2017
An officer did not violate clearly established law and was entitled to qualified immunity when he arrived late at an ongoing police action, saw shots being fired by people inside a house surrounded by other officers, and fatally shot an armed occupant of the house without first giving a warning.
Lightfoot v. Cendant Mortgage Corp.	580 U.S. 82	January 18, 2017
Plaintiffs may file lawsuits against Fannie Mae in any state or federal court that is already endowed with subject-matter jurisdiction over the suit.
Buck v. Davis	580 U.S. 100	February 22, 2017
An ineffective assistance of counsel claim is likely appropriate when a criminal defendant's attorney enters evidence that the defendant is likely to be a future danger because of his race and the defendant's sentence was probably based on this evidence.
Life Technologies Corp. v. Promega Corp.	580 U.S. 140	February 22, 2017
The sale of a single component of a patented invention in a foreign market does not give rise to liability under the Patent Act of 1952.
Fry v. Napoleon Community Schools	580 U.S. 154	February 22, 2017
Exhaustion of the Individuals with Disabilities Education Act's (IDEA's) administrative procedures is unnecessary where the gravamen of the plaintiff’s suit is something other than the denial of the IDEA’s core guarantee of a free appropriate public education (FAPE). Furthermore, the court should properly analyze the gravamen of a plaintiff's charges to determine if those charges seek relief for a denial of FAPE, per the test set out by the Court (see below for more information on this). The Sixth Circuit vacated and remanded.
Bethune-Hill v. Va. State Bd. of Elections	580 U.S. 178	March 1, 2017
An analysis of whether a state's legislative district lines were drawn constitutionally requires consideration of the actual basis for drawing the lines, not the state's post hoc justifications.
Peña-Rodriguez v. Colorado	580 U.S. 206	March 6, 2017
The Sixth Amendment requires an exception to the no-impeachment rule when a juror makes a clear statement indicating reliance on racial stereotypes or animus to convict a criminal defendant.
Beckles v. United States	580 U.S. 256	March 6, 2017
The Federal Sentencing Guidelines, including § 4B1.2(a)'s residual clause, are not subject to vagueness challenges under the Due Process Clause.
Rippo v. Baker	580 U.S. 285	March 6, 2017
A judge's recusal is required when, objectively speaking, the probability of actual bias on the part of the judge or decisionmaker is too high to be constitutionally tolerable. This may happen even when the judge has no actual bias.
NLRB v. SW General, Inc.	580 U.S. 288	March 21, 2017
The Federal Vacancies Reform Act prevents a person who has been nominated to fill a vacant office requiring Senate confirmation from performing the duties of that office in an acting capacity. The prohibition applies to anyone performing acting service under the FVRA.
SCA Hygiene Products Aktiebolag v. First Quality Baby Products, LLC	580 U.S. 328	March 21, 2017
Laches is not an appropriate defense against a claim for damages brought within a statute of limitations period.
Manuel v. Joliet	580 U.S. 357	March 21, 2017
A criminal defendant may challenge his pretrial detention on the ground that it violated the Fourth Amendment.
Endrew F. v. Douglas County School Dist. RE–1	580 U.S. 386	March 22, 2017
To meet its substantive obligation under the IDEA, a school must offer an Individualized Education Program (IEP) reasonably calculated to enable a child to make progress appropriate in light of the child’s circumstances. United States Court of Appeals for the Tenth Circuit vacated and remanded.
Star Athletica, L.L.C. v. Varsity Brands, Inc.	580 U.S. 405	March 22, 2017
Aesthetic design elements on useful articles, like clothing, can be copyrightable if they can be separately identified as art and exist independently of the useful article.
Czyzewski v. Jevic Holding Corp.	580 U.S. 451	March 22, 2017
Bankruptcy courts may not approve structured dismissals that provide for distributions that do not follow ordinary priority rules without the consent of affected creditors.
