= Shaw v. United States =

- Supreme Court of the United States

Argued October 4, 2016 Decided December 12, 2016
- Full case name: Lawrence Eugene Shaw, Petitioner v. United States
- Docket no.: 15-5991
- Citations: 580 U.S. 63 (more) 137 S. Ct. 462; 196 L. Ed. 2d 372
- Opinion announcement: Opinion announcement

Case history
- Prior: United States v. Shaw, 781 F.3d 1130 (9th Cir. 2015)

Holding
- A scheme to defraud customers also deprives the bank of money in which the bank held a "property right"; therefore, criminal defendants may be convicted under the federal bank-fraud statute for schemes to defraud bank customers.

Court membership
- Chief Justice John Roberts Associate Justices Anthony Kennedy · Clarence Thomas; Ruth Bader Ginsburg · Stephen Breyer; Samuel Alito · Sonia Sotomayor; Elena Kagan

Case opinion
- Majority: Breyer, joined by unanimous

Laws applied
- 18 U.S.C. § 1344

Shaw v. United States, 580 U.S. 63 (2016), was a United States Supreme Court case tin which the court held that a scheme to defraud customers also deprives the bank of money in which the bank held a "property right"; therefore, criminal defendants may be convicted under the federal bank-fraud statute for schemes to defraud bank customers.

== Background ==
Lawrence Shaw received the information from a bank account at Bank of America that belonged to a customer, Stanley Hsu. Shaw used that information to take money from Hsu but did not directly steal from the bank. Shaw was convicted under a federal statute criminalizing fraud against banks and appealed, arguing his target was its customer.

== Decision ==
In a unanimous opinion written by Justice Stephen Breyer, the Court held that a scheme to defraud customers also deprives the bank of money in which the bank held a "property right", and criminal defendants may therefore be convicted under the federal statute for schemes to defraud bank customers. However, the Supreme Court remanded the case to the United States Court of Appeals for the Ninth Circuit to determine whether the trial court administered an erroneous jury instruction.
