= Bravo-Fernandez v. United States =

- Supreme Court of the United States

Argued October 4, 2016 Decided November 29, 2016
- Full case name: Juan Bravo-Fernandez and Hector Martinez-Maldonado, Petitioners v. United States
- Docket no.: 15-537
- Citations: 580 U.S. 5 (more) 137 S. Ct. 352; 196 L. Ed. 2d 242

Case history
- Prior: United States v. Bravo-Fernandez, 790 F.3d 41 (1st Cir. 2015); cert. granted, 136 S. Ct. 1491 (2016).

Holding
- The issue-preclusion component of the Double Jeopardy Clause does not bar the Government from retrying defendants, like petitioners, after a jury has returned irreconcilably inconsistent verdicts of conviction and acquittal and the convictions are later vacated for legal error unrelated to the inconsistency.

Court membership
- Chief Justice John Roberts Associate Justices Anthony Kennedy · Clarence Thomas; Ruth Bader Ginsburg · Stephen Breyer; Samuel Alito · Sonia Sotomayor; Elena Kagan

Case opinions
- Majority: Ginsburg, joined by unanimous
- Concurrence: Thomas

Laws applied
- U.S. Const. amend. V

Bravo-Fernandez v. United States, 580 U.S. 5 (2016), was a case in which the Supreme Court of the United States clarified the application of the Fifth Amendment's Double Jeopardy Clause to cases in which a jury returns irreconcilable verdicts that convict a defendant on one count and acquit a defendant on another count when both counts rely upon the same ultimate fact.

In a unanimous opinion written by Justice Ruth Bader Ginsburg, the Court held that the government may re-try criminal defendants after a jury returns irreconcilable verdicts when the conviction is later vacated because of a procedural error that is unrelated to the inconsistency. Justice Clarence Thomas filed a concurring opinion, stating that although he joins with the majority, the Court should reconsider the two cases that Ginsburg relied on in her argument, Ashe v. Swenson and Yeager v. United States.

== See also ==
- List of United States Supreme Court cases
- List of United States Supreme Court cases, volume 580
- List of United States Supreme Court cases by the Roberts Court
