= Packingham v. North Carolina =

- Supreme Court of the United States

Argued February 27, 2017 Decided June 19, 2017
- Full case name: Lester Gerard Packingham, Petitioner v. North Carolina
- Docket no.: 15-1194
- Citations: 582 U.S. 98 (more) 137 S. Ct. 1730; 198 L. Ed. 2d 273
- Argument: Oral argument
- Opinion announcement: Opinion announcement

Case history
- Prior: State v. Packingham, 368 N.C. 380, 777 S.E.2d 738 (2015); cert. granted, 137 S. Ct. 368 (2016).

Holding
- A statute prohibiting registered sex offenders from accessing social media websites impermissibly restricts lawful speech in violation of the First Amendment.

Court membership
- Chief Justice John Roberts Associate Justices Anthony Kennedy · Clarence Thomas; Ruth Bader Ginsburg · Stephen Breyer; Samuel Alito · Sonia Sotomayor; Elena Kagan · Neil Gorsuch

Case opinions
- Majority: Kennedy, joined by Ginsburg, Breyer, Sotomayor, Kagan
- Concurrence: Alito (in judgment), joined by Roberts, Thomas
- Gorsuch took no part in the consideration or decision of the case.

Laws applied
- U.S. Const. amend. I

Packingham v. North Carolina, 582 U.S. 98 (2017), is a case in which the Supreme Court of the United States held that a North Carolina statute that prohibited registered sex offenders from using social media websites was unconstitutional because it violated the First Amendment to the U.S. Constitution, which protects freedom of speech.

In 2010, Lester Gerard Packingham, a registered sex offender, posted on Facebook under a pseudonym to comment favorably on a recent traffic court experience. Police then identified Packingham and charged him with violating North Carolina's law. Packingham moved to dismiss the charges, arguing that the state's law violated the First Amendment. The trial court dismissed this motion and ultimately convicted Packingham. A state appellate court initially reversed the trial court, holding that the law did violate the First Amendment, but the North Carolina Supreme Court, the state's highest court, disagreed and reinstated the conviction.

In June 2017, the U.S. Supreme Court unanimously reversed the North Carolina Supreme Court's judgment. In the majority opinion authored by Justice Anthony Kennedy, the Court held that social media—defined broadly to include Facebook, Amazon.com, The Washington Post, and WebMD, among many others—is a "protected space" under the First Amendment for lawful speech. The Court offered that North Carolina could protect children through less restrictive means, such as prohibiting "conduct that often presages a sexual crime, like contacting a minor or using a website to gather information about a minor".

== Background ==
=== North Carolina statute ===
In 2008, the state of North Carolina passed a law that made it a felony for a registered sex offender "to access a commercial social networking Web site where the sex offender knows that the site permits minor children to become members or to create or maintain personal Web pages". The law defined a "commercial social networking Web site" using four criteria. Specifically, the website must:

1. be "operated by a person who derives revenue from membership fees, advertising, or other sources related to the operation of the Web site".
2. facilitate "the social introduction between two or more persons for the purposes of friendship, meeting other persons, or information exchanges".
3. allow "users to create Web pages or personal profiles that contain information such as the name or nickname of the user, photographs placed on the personal Web page by the user, other personal information about the user, and links to other personal Web pages on the commercial social networking Web site of friends or associates of the user that may be accessed by other users or visitors to the Web site".
4. provide "users or visitors... mechanisms to communicate with other users, such as a message board, chat room, electronic mail, or instant messenger".

The law exempted websites that "Provid[e] only one of the following discrete services: photo-sharing, electronic mail, instant messenger, or chat room or message board platform", as well as websites that have as their primary purpose "the facilitation of commercial transactions involving goods or services between [their] members or visitors".

=== Facts of the case ===
In 2002, Lester Gerard Packingham was convicted of taking "indecent liberties with a child", a felony that required him to register as a sex offender. A North Carolina court sentenced him to 10–12 months in prison with 24 months of supervised release. He was given no other special instructions on his behavior outside of prison other than to "remain away from" the minor. In 2010, after a state court dismissed a traffic ticket against Packingham, he submitted a post on Facebook under the name "J. R. Gerrard", stating: "Man God is Good! How about I got so much favor they dismissed the ticket before court even started? No fine, no court cost, no nothing spent. . . . . .Praise be to GOD, WOW! Thanks JESUS!" The Durham Police Department identified Packingham as the author of the post after cross-checking the time of the post with recently dismissed traffic tickets, and a grand jury indicted him for violating the North Carolina statute.

=== Lower court proceedings ===
Initially, Packingham moved to dismiss his indictment, arguing that it violated the First Amendment. A North Carolina Superior Court judge denied this motion, and he was convicted of violating the North Carolina social media law. Packingham appealed his conviction to the North Carolina Court of Appeals, which reversed the trial court's decision in 2013. Applying intermediate scrutiny, the court of appeals determined that North Carolina's law violated the First Amendment because it was overbroad, applying to all registered sex offenders regardless of whether the offender had committed a crime involving a minor or whether the offender was a continuing threat to minors. The appeals court also stated that the law had been defined broadly enough to prohibit a registered sex offender from conducting a wide array of Internet activity, such as "conducting a 'Google' search, purchasing items on Amazon.com, or accessing a plethora of Web sites unrelated to online communication with minors".

In 2015, the North Carolina Supreme Court, the state's highest court, reversed the court of appeals, holding that the law was "constitutional in all respects". The North Carolina Supreme Court found that the statute was a "limitation on conduct" and did not impede any free speech. The state had a vested interest in “forestalling the illicit lurking and contact of minors” by registered sex offenders and potential future victims, and upheld Packingham's conviction.

== Supreme Court ruling ==
Packingham filed a petition for a writ of certiorari with the Supreme Court of the United States. The federal government also filed a brief recommending that the Supreme Court grant certiorari, arguing that the North Carolina Supreme Court incorrectly decided the case in favor of the state. The U.S. Supreme Court granted certiorari in October 2016. Amicus briefs in support of Packingham were filed by the libertarian Cato Institute and the American Civil Liberties Union. The North Carolina Supreme Court filed a brief supporting its prior decision, urging the importance of protecting minors from being stalked online.

=== Oral argument ===
The oral argument took place in February 2017. Packingham’s lawyer, David T. Goldberg, argued that the law banned “vast swaths of First Amendment activity”, went too far in restricting which Internet sites could be accessed, and forbade use of the Internet in general. The law targeted speech on some of the platforms that Americans use most often, Goldberg noted, and that under the law Packingham could not even use Twitter to read the myriad messages discussing his own case. He further noted that the law imposes punishment without regard to whether the offender actually did anything wrong.

North Carolina’s senior deputy Attorney General, Robert C. Montgomery, argued for the state, and claimed that communication through social media sites is a “crucial channel”. Justice Sonia Sotomayor asked Montgomery to provide evidence as to the claim that by giving Packingham Internet privileges, he would commit another crime. Justice Stephen Breyer added that “It seems to be well-settled law that the state can’t [bar usage] unless there is a 'clear and present danger'."

=== Opinion of the Court ===
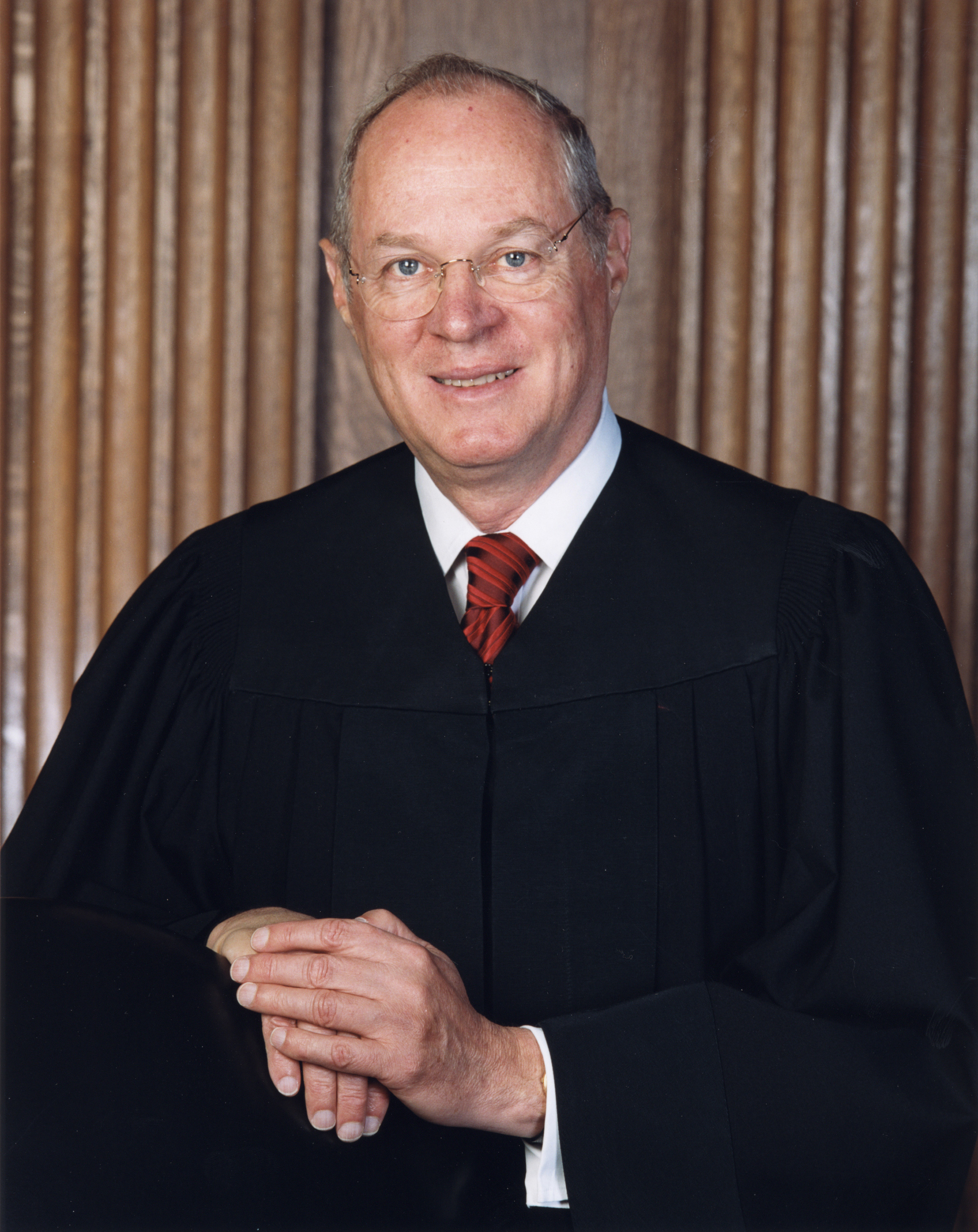
Justice Anthony Kennedy authored the majority opinion in Packingham v. North Carolina.

In June 2017 the Supreme Court delivered a judgment in favor of Packingham, unanimously voting to reverse the state court's ruling. Justice Anthony Kennedy authored the decision, joined by Justice Ginsburg, Justice Breyer, Justice Sotomayor, and Justice Kagan. Kennedy explained the decision: "A fundamental principle of the First Amendment is that all persons have access to places where they can speak and listen, and then, after reflection, speak and listen once more." He continued that "By prohibiting sex offenders from using those websites, North Carolina with one broad stroke bars access to what for many are the principal sources for knowing current events, checking ads for employment, speaking and listening in the modern public square, and otherwise exploring the vast realms of human thought and knowledge." Citing Ashcroft v. Free Speech Coalition as a precedent, Kennedy also wrote: "It is well established that, as a general rule, the Government 'may not suppress lawful speech as the means to suppress unlawful speech'."

=== Concurring opinion ===
Justice Samuel Alito wrote an opinion concurring in the judgment, joined by John Roberts and Clarence Thomas. While Alito agreed that the state statute at issue violated the First Amendment, he noted that there are reasonable scenarios for which legal bans for sex offenders can be placed, such as for sites targeted at teenagers. Justice Gorsuch took no part in the decision of the case.

== Impact ==
Packingham v. North Carolina was one of the first U.S. Supreme Court cases to analyze the role of the First Amendment with respect to social media use. It has also served as an important precedent for media usage restrictions placed on convicted criminals. In an article published in the North Dakota Law Review, Katie Miller wrote that the Packingham decision may be used to challenge laws and restrictions in other states similar to the one in North Carolina.

More critically, Madeleine Burnette-McGrath, in an article published in the Ohio Northern University Law Review, wrote that "Packingham adopts a new avenue for government regulation, allowing the government to interfere with individual social media entities and their ability to regulate speech that occurs on their websites" Specifically, Packingham delineates an intermediate scrutiny test for governmental regulation of Internet speech, under which a government agent "need only put into effect a law that is both narrowly tailored to and includes a substantial government interest." Burnette-McGrath described this as a "low standard" that may inspire states to "implement new laws under the guise of substantial government interest or of being narrowly tailored" at the detriment of free speech on the Internet.

== See also ==
- List of United States Supreme Court cases, volume 582
