= Sessions v. Morales-Santana =

2017 Supreme Court Case

- Supreme Court of the United States

Decided June 12, 2017
- Full case name: Sessions v. Morales-Santana
- Docket no.: 15-1191
- Citations: 582 U.S. 47 (more)

Holding
- Maintaining longer physical presence requirements for unwed fathers than unwed mothers in regards to the transfer of derivative citizenship violated the Equal Protection and Due Process Clauses.

Court membership
- Chief Justice John Roberts Associate Justices Anthony Kennedy · Clarence Thomas; Ruth Bader Ginsburg · Stephen Breyer; Samuel Alito · Sonia Sotomayor; Elena Kagan · Neil Gorsuch

Case opinions
- Majority: Ginsburg, joined by Roberts, Kennedy, Breyer, Sotomayor, and Kagan
- Concurrence: Thomas (in judgement), joined by Alito
- Gorsuch took no part in the consideration or decision of the case.

Laws applied
- 8 U.S.C. § 1401; 8 U.S.C. § 1409

Sessions v. Morales-Santana, 582 U.S. 47 (2017), was a United States Supreme Court case that challenged the difference in physical presence requirements in the Immigration and Nationality Act (INA) for unwed mothers and fathers when acquiring citizenship for a child born in a foreign country. Unwed fathers had longer physical presence requirements than unwed mothers in regards to being able to convey derivative citizenship. In an eight to zero decision, the court found that the difference in physical presence requirements violated the equal protection clause and due process. Justice Thomas wrote a concurring opinion. The case had implications for Congress's plenary power over immigration and the issue of statelessness.

== Background ==
The case involves the deportation of Luis Ramon Morales-Santana, who claims birthright citizenship through his father. The government challenges this by arguing that his father did not meet the physical presence requirement necessary to pass citizenship from an unwed U.S. citizen father to his child. The case involves a challenge to 8 U.S.C. §§ 1401 and 1409 which set the physical presence requirements for derivative citizenship.

Luis Ramon Morales-Santana was born in the Dominican Republic in 1962 to José Morales, who was a citizen of the United States, and a Dominican woman who was not. José Morales moved to the Dominican Republic 20 days before his 19th birthday, which failed the physical presence requirement that would allow him to transfer citizenship to his children. The physical presence requirement said that unwed U.S. citizen fathers had to have lived for 10 years in the United States, and five of those years had to occur after age 14. This has since been changed to 5 years, with 2 years after age 14. José Morales eventually marries Morales-Santana's mother, claims Morales-Santana as his child on the birth certificate, and moves with him to the United States. José Morales died in 1976, but Morales-Santana continued to live in New York.

In 2000, Morales-Santana was subject to deportation due to multiple criminal convictions. The government claimed that because his father did not meet the five-year presence requirement, Morales-Santana is not a U.S. citizen. Morales-Santana challenges this by saying that the difference in physical presence requirements violates the equal protection guarantee in the Constitution. He is not arguing that his right to equal protection was violated, but rather his father's right to equal protection. The Board of Immigration Appeals (BIA) denied this appeal, and the Second Circuit then reversed the decision and applied the shorter requirement for unwed U.S. citizen mothers as the remedy.

== Decision ==
Justice Ginsburg wrote the majority opinion for the court. They first found that Morales-Santana had third-party standing because of the close relationship between father and child, and therefore, Morales-Santana is arguing for his father's right to equal protection. After establishing the close relationship, the court argues that the gender discrimination in the INA did not serve important and persuasive governmental objectives, and they draw on the history of gender discrimination against unwed mothers in the United States to make this point. The court also argues that Congress's plenary power over immigration and deportation did not apply here as Morales-Santana claims he is a citizen and has been since birth. Therefore, he should be treated as a citizen by the law.

The court, in deciding a remedy in the case, chose to apply the five-year presence requirement to both unwed fathers and unwed mothers. The alternative option was to extend the shorter requirement for unwed mothers to unwed fathers. They argued that applying the shorter requirement would unfairly discriminate against married couples who are held to the longer requirement.

Justice Thomas, joined by Justice Alito, issued a concurring opinion agreeing with the court's holding that they cannot remedy the equal protection violation as extending the shorter presence requirement does not solve it. They disagree, however, with the idea of interpreting the law at all by claiming that this power rests solely with Congress.

== Impact ==
The most immediate impact is that the court's refusal to extend the shorter benefit has caused more questions than answers. One question was about how Congress's plenary power would be changed. A comment from Sandy De Sousa argues that while the decision does not signal an erosion of the power, it does signal that the power is "yielding to certain constitutional principles".

There have also been questions put forth around whether the decision applies only to statutory citizenship at birth or if other types of derivative citizenship apply. Would other courts provide the same remedy that the Supreme Court offers here or choose to level up instead? How does the decision apply to non-traditional families? And does this decision have larger implications on gender discrimination generally?

Some of these questions have begun to be answered by lower courts. For instance, the Third Circuit Court argued, citing Sessions v. Morales-Santana, that when a petitioner claims citizenship, their equal protection claims are treated the same as in non-immigration cases. They do not have a lower standard of scrutiny, as implied by Congress's plenary power over immigration.

Some have also argued that the decision will have effects on statelessness and possibly exacerbate it by applying the longer physical presence requirement to unwed mothers. One case note argues that the decision failed to account for the right to a nationality in its remedy and raised the risk of statelessness for foreign-born children.
