= Jae Lee v. United States =

- Supreme Court of the United States

Argued March 28, 2017 Decided June 23, 2017
- Full case name: Jae Lee v. United States
- Docket no.: 16-327
- Citations: 582 U.S. 357 (more)
- Argument: Oral argument
- Opinion announcement: Opinion announcement

Case history
- Prior: United States v. Lee, 825 F.3d 311
- Subsequent: Jae Lee v. United States, 14-5369 (6th Cir. 2017) (on remand)

Holding
- When a criminal defendant raises Sixth Amendment Ineffective assistance of counsel claims, they only need to prove by reasonable probability that they were wrongly prejudiced by their counsel to accept a plea deal rather than go to trial.

Court membership
- Chief Justice John Roberts Associate Justices Anthony Kennedy · Clarence Thomas; Ruth Bader Ginsburg · Stephen Breyer; Samuel Alito · Sonia Sotomayor; Elena Kagan · Neil Gorsuch

Case opinions
- Majority: Roberts, joined by Kennedy, Ginsburg, Breyer, Sotomayor, Kagan
- Dissent: Thomas, joined by Alito (except part I)
- Gorsuch took no part in the consideration or decision of the case.

Laws applied
- VI Amendment

Jae Lee v. United States, 582 U.S. 357 (2017), was a Supreme Court case in which the Court held that when a criminal defendant raises Sixth Amendment ineffective assistance of counsel claims, they only need to prove by reasonable probability that they were wrongly prejudiced by their counsel to accept a plea deal rather than go to trial. The Court specified that the issue did not arise from a possibility that the outcome of Lee's conviction would've been different had he gone to trial. The case was largely decided based on the landmark case Strickland v. Washington, 466 U.S. 668 (1984).

== Historical context ==
55-year-old South Korean immigrant Jae Lee, and his family, immigrated to New York, United States, in 1982 at the age of 13. After graduating high school in New York he moved to Memphis, Tennessee and, with support from his parents, opened a Chinese restaurant in a Memphis suburb. While he found some success as a restaurateur, even opening a second restaurant nearby, Lee ultimately turned to illicit substances for further capital gains, which was known since 1999.

=== Sting operation setup ===
In very early December 2008, a confidential informant (CI) informed the Drug Enforcement Administration Memphis Division and the United States Attorney's Office that they had personally purchased 200 ecstasy pills and 2 ounces of hydroponic marijuana from Lee over a period lasting from January 2001 to December 2008. The CI told authorities that they had a debt with Lee in an amount of $150, and on December 8, 2008, they gave the CI $150 in government funds to pay the debt at Lee's residence while they surveilled them from the outside. When the CI returned, they claimed to have witnessed Lee personally wrap 15 ecstasy tablets in cellophane.

On December 11, the authorities further provided the CI with $300 to buy 15 ecstasy pills from Lee, and while inside Lee informed the CI he now charged $20 per pill instead of $15, and the CI made the purchase anyway. With this information and proof, on January 6, 2009, the DEA executed a federal search warrant on Lee's residence. During the search of his home, the authorities found 88 ecstasy pills, 3 Valium tablets, $32,432 in cash, and a Norinco, Model 90, 7.62 caliber rifle.

=== District Court ===
Finally, on January 28, 2009, a federal grand jury returned a single-count indictment against Lee for possession of ecstasy with an intent to distribute. On June 17, 2009, Lee presented himself before U.S. District Court Judge Bernice B. Donald and, in accordance with a plea bargain, pleaded guilty to the sole count. Lee, under advisement from his lawyer, fully believed this conviction wouldn't affect his current immigration status, that being a permanent resident. Lee was concerned about what this conviction would be for his lawful status, a concern even somewhat brought up by Lee during the plea bargain hearing,

Judge: And are you a U.S. citizen?

Lee: No, Your Honor.

Judge: Okay. A conviction on this charge then could result in your being deported. It could also affect your ability to attain the status of a United States citizen. If you do become a United States citizen, it could affect your rights to participate in certain federal benefits, such as student loans.

Does that affect at all your decision about whether you want to plead guilty or not?

Lee: Yes, Your Honor.

Judge: Okay. How does it affect your decision?

Lee: I don't understand.

Judge: Okay. Well, knowing those things do you still want to go forward and plead guilty?

Lee: Yes, Your Honor.

The sentence and final judgement were fully entered on October 22, 2009, due to some delays, and Lee did not directly appeal his sentence.

==== Lee's appeal ====
On September 24, 2010, Lee filed a § 2255 (vacate, set aside, or correct a sentence) motion, which was eventually referred to U.S. Magistrate Judge Diane Vescovo on January 5, 2012. Judge Vescovo conducted an evidentiary hearing and eventually on August 6, 2013, she released a Recommendation and Report (R&R) to District Court Judge John Folkes in favor of Lee. Her reasoning was,

"Fitzgerald's representation of Lee was objectively unreasonable in that he affirmatively misadvised Lee as to the immigration consequences of pleading guilty to the drug-trafficking crime for which Lee was indicted."

Despite the R&R in Lee's favor, Judge Folkes dismissed Lee's arguments and vacated Judge Vescovo's judgement on March 20, 2014. The reason for rejection was due to the fact "Lee [had] not established prejudice."

=== Circuit Court of Appeals ===
After the ruling against him, Lee appealed to the U.S. Court of Appeals for the Sixth Circuit which held oral arguments on January 28, 2016, and filed its decision on June 8. In its decision written by Circuit Court Judge Alice Batchelder the Circuit Court affirmed the District Court's decision, largely basing it off the fact "that prejudice requires showing a “substantial, not just conceivable,” chance of a different result..." citing Harrington v. Richter, 562 U.S. 112 (2011). The Court, interestingly, did however seem to show compassion toward Lee's situation, saying,

"In reaching this conclusion, we should not be read as endorsing Lee’s impending deportation. It is unclear to us why it is in our national interests—much less the interests of justice—to exile a productive member of our society to a country he hasn’t lived in since childhood for committing a relatively small-time drug offense. But our duty is neither to prosecute nor to pardon; it is simply to say “what the law is.” Marbury v. Madison, 5 U.S. 137, 177 (1803)."

== Supreme Court decision ==
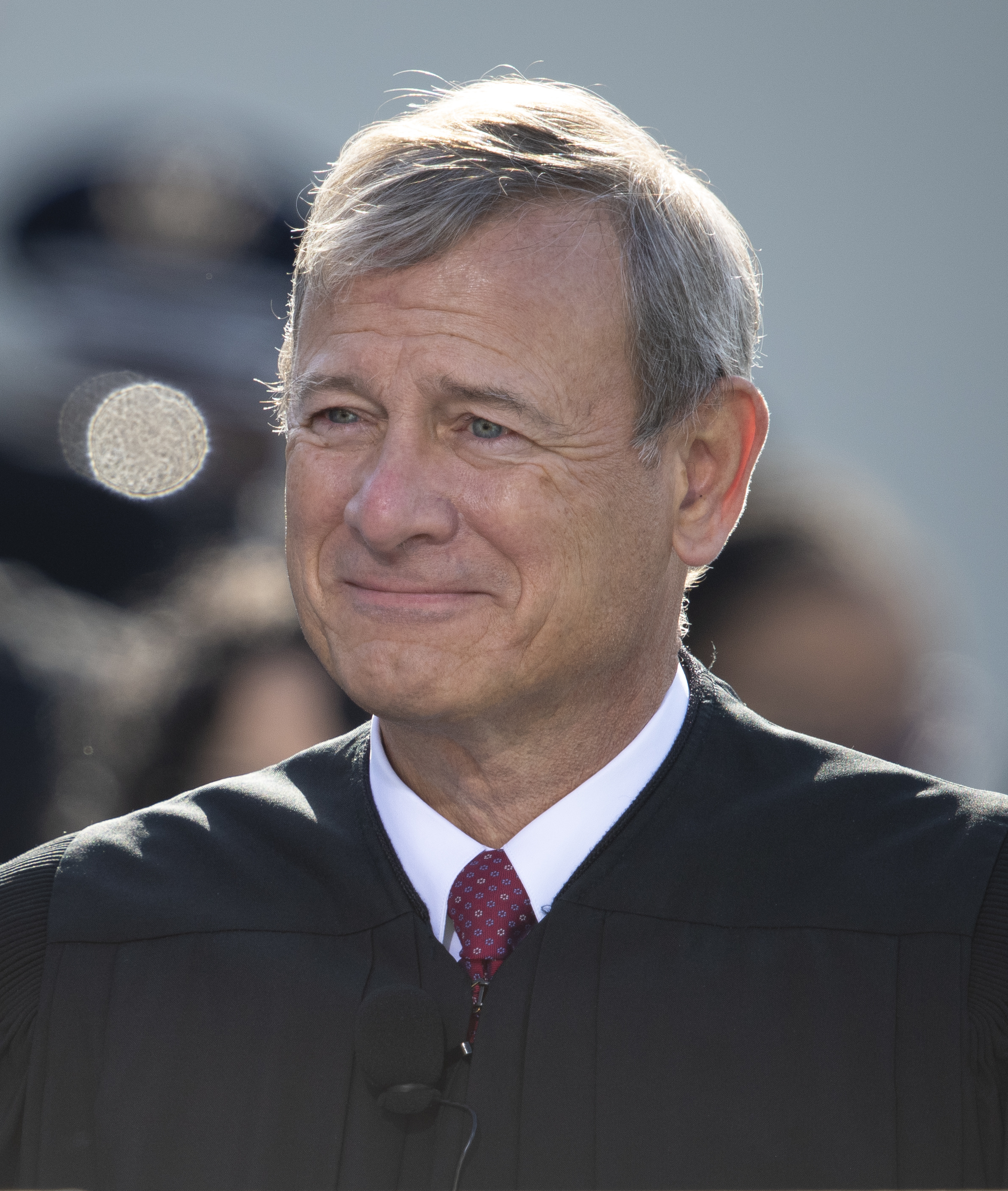
Chief Justice John Roberts authored the majority opinion.

Lee then further appealed to the Supreme Court, which granted certiorari on December 14, 2016, held arguments on March 28, 2017, and handed down its decision on June 23, 2017. In a 6-2 decision, the Court sided with Lee, overturned the Circuit and District Court's decisions, and remanded the case. Chief Justice John Roberts authored the majority opinion, with Justice Clarence Thomas writing a dissent, and was joined by Justice Samuel Alito.

=== Majority opinion ===
The majority opinion established the issue at fact, and there was no issue in regards to whether the advice Lee's lawyer gave him was "effective", which it wasn't. The issue at hand was "whether Lee can show he was prejudiced by that erroneous advice."

The majority denies the dissent's claims as well, saying,

"The dissent contends that a defendant must also show that he would have been better off going to trial. That is true when the defendant’s decision about going to trial turns on his prospects of success and those are affected by the attorney’s error—for instance, where a defendant alleges that his lawyer should have but did not seek to suppress an improperly obtained confession. Premo v. Moore, 562 U. S. 115, 118 (2011)"

The majority realizes and admits the fact the case was interesting in its "he said, she said" type demeanor, saying,

"Lee, on the other hand, argues he can establish prejudice under Hill because he never would have accepted a guilty plea had he known that he would be deported as a result. Lee insists he would have gambled on trial, risking more jail time for whatever small chance there might be of an acquittal that would let him remain in the United States The Government responds that, since Lee had no viable defense at trial, he would almost certainly have lost and found himself still subject to deportation, with a lengthier prison sentence to boot. Lee, the Government contends, cannot show prejudice from accepting a plea where his only hope at trial was that something unexpected and unpredictable might occur that would lead to an acquittal." (citation omitted)

The Court ultimately ruled in favor of Lee from its belief that had his attorney not misled him as to the effect the plea bargain on his immigration status, he likely wouldn't have taken it, saying,

"Lee’s claim that he would not have accepted a plea had he known it would lead to deportation is backed by substantial and uncontroverted evidence. Accordingly we conclude Lee has demonstrated a “reasonable probability that, but for [his] counsel’s errors, he would not have pleaded guilty and would have insisted on going to trial. Hill" (citation omitted)

=== Thomas' dissent ===
Justice Thomas, joined by Justice Alito in all but Part I, wrote a dissenting opinion, firstly stating that at this point "[T]he Court today holds that a defendant can undo a guilty plea, well after sentencing and in the face of overwhelming evidence of guilt".

Thomas rejects the use of the Sixth Amendment in this case, citing his dissent in Padilla v. Kentucky, 559 U.S. 356, 388 (2010). He further dissents on the fact that Strickland establishes that Lee must show "reasonable probability that, but for counsel’s unprofessional errors, the result of the proceeding would have been different.” He argues that even if Lee had not taken the plea and gone to trial originally, the outcome would have been no different and thus fails to meet the strict Strickland standards.
