= McWilliams v. Dunn =

- Supreme Court of the United States

Argued April 24, 2017 Decided June 19, 2017
- Full case name: James E. McWilliams v. Jefferson S. Dunn, Commissioner, Alabama Dept. of Corrections, et al.
- Docket no.: 16-5294
- Citations: 582 U.S. 183 (more)

Holding
- When the conditions of Ake v. Oklahoma are met, the state must provide a defendant with access to a mental health expert who is sufficiently available to the defense and independent from the prosecution to effectively conduct an appropriate examination and assist in evaluation, preparation, and presentation of the defense.

Court membership
- Chief Justice John Roberts Associate Justices Anthony Kennedy · Clarence Thomas; Ruth Bader Ginsburg · Stephen Breyer; Samuel Alito · Sonia Sotomayor; Elena Kagan · Neil Gorsuch

Case opinions
- Majority: Breyer, joined by Kennedy, Ginsburg, Sotomayor, Kagan
- Dissent: Alito, joined by Roberts, Thomas, Gorsuch

McWilliams v. Dunn, 582 U.S. 183 (2017), is a United States Supreme Court case in which the court held that, when the conditions of Ake v. Oklahoma are met, the state must provide a defendant with access to a mental health expert who is sufficiently available to the defense and independent from the prosecution to effectively conduct an appropriate examination and assist in evaluation, preparation, and presentation of the defense.

James E. McWilliams was an incarcerated person on death row. He was convicted of various crimes including murder, rape, and robbery. The crime that landed him on death row was the 1984 sexual assault and murder of Patricia Reynolds.

The Court ruled 5–4 in favor of Williams on the grounds of the defendant not having access to an independent mental health expert during his trial with the lower appellate court not considering this in the previous appeal, as written in the opinion authored by Justice Breyer. In 2019, the United States Court of Appeals for the Eleventh Circuit granted McWilliams a new sentencing hearing. As of 2021, McWilliams has since been removed from death row and is now serving a life sentence.
