= SCA Hygiene Products Aktiebolag v. First Quality Baby Products, LLC =

- Supreme Court of the United States

Decided March 21, 2017
- Full case name: SCA Hygiene Products Aktiebolag v. First Quality Baby Products, LLC
- Docket no.: 15-927
- Citations: 580 U.S. ___ (more)

Holding
- Laches is not an appropriate defense against a claim for damages brought within a statute of limitations period.

Court membership
- Chief Justice John Roberts Associate Justices Anthony Kennedy · Clarence Thomas; Ruth Bader Ginsburg · Stephen Breyer; Samuel Alito · Sonia Sotomayor; Elena Kagan

Case opinions
- Majority: Alito
- Dissent: Breyer

SCA Hygiene Products Aktiebolag v. First Quality Baby Products, LLC, 580 U.S. ___ (2017), was a United States Supreme Court case in which the court held that laches is not an appropriate defense against a claim for damages brought within a statute of limitations period.

== Background ==
In 2003, SCA Hygiene Products Aktiebolag notified First Quality Baby Products that their adult incontinence products infringed an SCA patent. First Quality responded that its own patent antedated SCA's patent and made it invalid. In 2004, SCA sought reexamination of its patent in light of First Quality's patent, and in 2007, the Patent and Trademark Office confirmed the SCA patent's validity. SCA sued First Quality for patent infringement in 2010. The federal district court granted summary judgment to First Quality on the grounds of equitable estoppel and laches. While SCA's appeal was pending, the Supreme Court held in Petrella v. Metro-Goldwyn-Mayer, Inc. that laches could not preclude a claim for damages incurred within the Copyright Act's 3-year limitations period. A Federal Circuit panel nevertheless affirmed the federal district court's laches holding based on Circuit precedent, which permitted laches to be asserted against a claim for damages incurred within the Patent Act's 6-year limitations period. The en banc court reheard the case in light of Petrella and reaffirmed the original panel's laches holding.

== Opinion of the court ==
The Supreme Court issued an opinion on March 21, 2017.
