= Life Technologies Corp. v. Promega Corp. =

- Supreme Court of the United States

Argued December 6, 2016 Decided February 22, 2017
- Full case name: Life Technologies Corporation, et al., Petitioners v. Promega Corporation
- Docket no.: 14-1538
- Citations: 580 U.S. 140 (more) 137 S. Ct. 734; 197 L. Ed. 2d 33; 121 U.S.P.Q.2d 1641

Case history
- Prior: Promega Corp. v. Life Techs. Corp., 773 F.3d 1338 (Fed. Cir. 2014); cert. granted, 136 S. Ct. 2505 (2016).
- Procedural: On writ of certiorari to the United States Court of Appeals for the Federal Circuit

Holding
- The sale of a single component of a patented invention in a foreign market does not give rise to liability under the Patent Act of 1952.

Court membership
- Chief Justice John Roberts Associate Justices Anthony Kennedy · Clarence Thomas; Ruth Bader Ginsburg · Stephen Breyer; Samuel Alito · Sonia Sotomayor; Elena Kagan

Case opinions
- Majority: Sotomayor, joined by Kennedy, Ginsburg, Breyer, Kagan; Thomas, Alito (all but Part II–C)
- Concurrence: Alito (in part), joined by Thomas
- Roberts took no part in the consideration or decision of the case.

Laws applied
- Patent Act of 1952, 35 U.S.C. § 271 et seq.

Life Technologies Corp. v. Promega Corp., 580 U.S. 140 (2017), was a case in which the United States Supreme Court clarified the application of the Patent Act of 1952 to the sale of components of patented inventions in foreign markets. In an opinion written by Associate Justice Sonia Sotomayor, the Court held that the sale of a "single component" in a foreign market "does not constitute a substantial portion of the components that can give rise to liability under [the Patent Act of 1952]." Justice Samuel Alito wrote an opinion concurring in part and concurring in the judgment, in which he was joined Justice Clarence Thomas. Chief Justice John Roberts took no part in the decision of the case.

== See also ==
- List of United States Supreme Court cases
- Lists of United States Supreme Court cases by volume
- List of United States Supreme Court cases by the Roberts Court
