= California Public Employees' Retirement System v. ANZ Securities, Inc. =

- Supreme Court of the United States

Decided June 26, 2017
- Full case name: California Public Employees' Retirement System v. ANZ Securities, Inc.
- Docket no.: 16-373
- Citations: 582 U.S. 497 (more)

Holding
- The statute of limitations for a complaint under Section 11 of the Securities Act of 1933 is not subject to equitable tolling.

Court membership
- Chief Justice John Roberts Associate Justices Anthony Kennedy · Clarence Thomas; Ruth Bader Ginsburg · Stephen Breyer; Samuel Alito · Sonia Sotomayor; Elena Kagan · Neil Gorsuch

Case opinions
- Majority: Kennedy
- Dissent: Ginsburg, joined by Breyer, Sotomayor, Kagan

California Public Employees' Retirement System v. ANZ Securities, Inc., 582 U.S. 497 (2017), was a United States Supreme Court case in which the court held that the statute of limitations for a complaint under Section 11 of the Securities Act of 1933 is not subject to equitable tolling.

== Background ==
Section 11 of the Securities Act of 1933 gives purchasers of securities "a right of action against an issuer or designated individuals," including securities underwriters, for any material misstatements or omissions in a registration statement. Section 13 provides two time limits for Section 11 suits. The first sentence states that an action "must be brought within one year after the discovery of the untrue statement or the omission, or after such discovery should have been made by the exercise of reasonable diligence...." The second sentence provides that "[i]n no event shall any such action be brought . . . more than three years after the security was bona fide offered to the public...."

In 2007 and 2008, Lehman Brothers Holdings Inc. raised capital through several public securities offerings. California Public Employees' Retirement System, the largest public pension fund in the country, purchased some of those securities. The System alleged that various financial firms were liable under the Act for their participation as underwriters in the transactions. In 2008, a putative class action was filed against the financial firms in the Southern District of New York. The complaint raised Section 11 claims, alleging that the registration statements for certain of Lehman's 2007 and 2008 securities offerings included material misstatements or omissions. Because the complaint was filed on behalf of all persons who purchased the identified securities, the System was a member of the putative class.

In February 2011, more than three years after the relevant securities offerings, the System filed a separate complaint against financial companies, among them ANZ Securities, in the Northern District of California, alleging violations identical to those in the class action on the System's own behalf. Soon thereafter, a proposed settlement was reached in the putative class action, but the System opted out of the class. The financial companies then moved to dismiss the System's individual suit, alleging that the Section 11 violations were untimely under the 3-year bar in the second sentence of Section 13. Petitioner countered that the 3-year period was tolled during the pendency of the class-action filing, relying on American Pipe & Construction Co. v. Utah. The trial court disagreed, and the Second Circuit Court of Appeals affirmed, holding that American Pipe's tolling principle is inapplicable to the 3-year bar. It also rejected the System's alternative argument that the timely filing of the class action made petitioner's individual claims timely as well.
