= Davila v. Davis =

- Supreme Court of the United States

Decided June 26, 2017
- Full case name: Davila v. Davis
- Docket no.: 16-6219
- Citations: 582 U.S. 521 (more)

Holding
- The ineffective assistance of postconviction counsel does not provide cause to excuse the procedural default of ineffective-assistance-of-appellate-counsel claims.

Court membership
- Chief Justice John Roberts Associate Justices Anthony Kennedy · Clarence Thomas; Ruth Bader Ginsburg · Stephen Breyer; Samuel Alito · Sonia Sotomayor; Elena Kagan · Neil Gorsuch

Case opinions
- Majority: Thomas
- Dissent: Breyer, joined by Ginsburg, Sotomayor, Kagan

Davila v. Davis, 582 U.S. 521 (2017), was a United States Supreme Court case in which the court held that the ineffective assistance of postconviction counsel does not provide cause to excuse the procedural default of ineffective-assistance-of-appellate-counsel claims.
