= Perry v. Merit Systems Protection Board =

Anthony W. Perry v. Merit Systems Protection Board
- Supreme Court of the United States

Decided June 23, 2017
- Full case name: Perry v. Merit Systems Protection Board
- Docket no.: 16-399
- Citations: 582 U.S. 420 (more)

Holding
- The proper review forum when the MSPB dismisses a mixed case on jurisdictional grounds is district court.

Court membership
- Chief Justice John Roberts Associate Justices Anthony Kennedy · Clarence Thomas; Ruth Bader Ginsburg · Stephen Breyer; Samuel Alito · Sonia Sotomayor; Elena Kagan · Neil Gorsuch

Case opinions
- Majority: Ginsburg
- Dissent: Gorsuch, joined by Thomas

Perry v. Merit Systems Protection Board, 582 U.S. 420 (2017), was a United States Supreme Court case in which the court held that the proper review forum when the Merit Systems Protection Board dismisses a mixed case on jurisdictional grounds is district court. A "mixed case" is a complaint brought by an employee about a serious adverse employment action that attributes the action, in whole or in part, to bias based on race, gender, age, or disability.

== Background ==
Under the Civil Service Reform Act of 1978 (CSRA), the Merit Systems Protection Board (MSPB or Board) has the power to review certain serious personnel actions against federal employees. If an employee asserts rights under the CSRA only, MSPB decisions are subject to judicial review exclusively in the Federal Circuit. If the employee invokes only federal anti-discrimination law, the proper forum for judicial review is federal district court.

An employee who complains of a serious adverse employment action and attributes the action, in whole or in part, to bias based on race, gender, age, or disability brings a "mixed case." When the MSPB dismisses a mixed case on the merits or on procedural grounds, review authority lies in district court, not the Federal Circuit. This case concerns the proper forum for judicial review when the MSPB dismisses such a case for lack of jurisdiction.

Anthony Perry received notice that he would be terminated from his employment at the United States Census Bureau for spotty attendance. Perry and the Bureau reached a settlement in which Perry agreed to a 30-day suspension and early retirement. The settlement also required Perry to dismiss discrimination claims he had filed separately with the Equal Employment Opportunity Commission (EEOC). After retiring, Perry appealed his suspension and retirement to the MSPB, alleging discrimination based on race, age, and disability, as well as retaliation by the Bureau for his prior discrimination complaints. The settlement, he maintained, did not stand in the way, because the Bureau had coerced him into signing it. However, an MSPB administrative law judge (ALJ) determined that Perry had failed to prove that the settlement was coerced. Presuming Perry's retirement to be voluntary, the ALJ dismissed his case. Because voluntary actions are not appealable to the MSPB, the ALJ observed, the Board lacked jurisdiction to entertain Perry's claims. The MSPB affirmed, deeming Perry's separation voluntary and therefore not subject to the Board's jurisdiction. If dissatisfied with the MSPB's ruling, the Board stated, Perry could seek judicial review in the Federal Circuit. Perry instead sought review in the D. C. Circuit, which, the parties later agreed, lacked jurisdiction. The D. C. Circuit held that the proper forum was the Federal Circuit and transferred the case there. The court concluded that an earlier case, Kloeckner v. Solis, did not tell them to do differently because it addressed dismissals on procedural grounds, not jurisdictional grounds.
