= Czyzewski v. Jevic Holding Corp. =

- Supreme Court of the United States

Decided March 22, 2017
- Full case name: Czyzewski v. Jevic Holding Corp.
- Docket no.: 15-649
- Citations: 580 U.S. ___ (more)

Holding
- Bankruptcy courts may not approve structured dismissals that provide for distributions that do not follow ordinary priority rules without the consent of affected creditors.

Court membership
- Chief Justice John Roberts Associate Justices Anthony Kennedy · Clarence Thomas; Ruth Bader Ginsburg · Stephen Breyer; Samuel Alito · Sonia Sotomayor; Elena Kagan

Case opinions
- Majority: Breyer
- Dissent: Thomas, joined by Alito

Czyzewski v. Jevic Holding Corp., 580 U.S. ___ (2017), was a United States Supreme Court case in which the court held that bankruptcy courts may not approve structured dismissals that provide for distributions that do not follow ordinary priority rules without the consent of affected creditors.

== Background ==
There are three possible conclusions to a Chapter 11 bankruptcy. First, debtor and creditors may negotiate a plan to govern the distribution of the estate's value. Second, the bankruptcy court may convert the case to Chapter 7 for liquidation of the business and distribution of its assets to creditors. Finally, the bankruptcy court may dismiss the case. A court ordering a dismissal ordinarily attempts to restore the pre-petition financial status quo. However, if perfect restoration proves difficult or impossible, the court may, "for cause," alter the dismissal's normal restorative consequences. That is, it may order a "structured dismissal."

The Bankruptcy Code also establishes basic priority rules for determining the order in which the court will distribute an estate's assets. The Code makes clear that distributions in a Chapter 7 liquidation must follow this prescribed order. Chapter 11 permits some flexibility, but a court still cannot confirm a plan that contains priority-violating distributions over the objection of an impaired creditor class. The Code does not explicitly state what priority rules—if any—apply to the distribution of assets in a structured dismissal.

Jevic Transportation filed for Chapter 11 bankruptcy after being purchased in a leveraged buyout by Sun Capital and CIT Group. The bankruptcy prompted two lawsuits. In the first, a group of former Jevic truckdrivers, including Casimir Czyzewski, was awarded a judgment against Jevic for Jevic's failure to provide proper notice of termination in violation of state and federal Worker Adjustment and Retraining Notification (WARN) Acts. Part of that judgment counted as a priority wage claim, entitling the workers to payment ahead of general unsecured claims against the Jevic estate.

In the second suit, a court-authorized committee representing Jevic's unsecured creditors sued Sun Capital and CIT Group for fraudulent conveyance in connection with the leveraged buyout of Jevic. These parties negotiated a settlement agreement that called for a structured dismissal of Jevic's Chapter 11 bankruptcy. Under the proposed structured dismissal, the truckers would receive nothing on their WARN claims, but lower-priority general unsecured creditors would be paid. The truckers argued that the distribution scheme violated the Code's priority rules by paying general unsecured claims ahead of their own. The Bankruptcy Court nevertheless approved the settlement agreement and dismissed the case, reasoning that because the proposed payouts would occur pursuant to a structured dismissal rather than an approved plan, the failure to follow ordinary priority rules did not bar approval. The truckers appealed, first to a federal district court and then the Third Circuit Court of Appeals, both of which affirmed the dismissal.

== Opinion of the court ==
The Supreme Court issued an opinion on March 22, 2017.
