= Lewis v. Clarke =

- Supreme Court of the United States

Argued January 9, 2017 Decided April 25, 2017
- Full case name: Brian Lewis, et al., Petitioners v. William Clarke
- Docket no.: 15-1500
- Citations: 581 U.S. 155 (more) 137 S. Ct. 1285; 197 L. Ed. 2d 631
- Opinion announcement: Opinion announcement

Case history
- Prior: 320 Conn. 706, 135 A.3d 677 (2016); cert. granted, 137 S. Ct. 31 (2016).

Holding
- Tribal sovereign immunity does not extend to suits against a tribal employee acting in his individual capacity.

Court membership
- Chief Justice John Roberts Associate Justices Anthony Kennedy · Clarence Thomas; Ruth Bader Ginsburg · Stephen Breyer; Samuel Alito · Sonia Sotomayor; Elena Kagan · Neil Gorsuch

Case opinions
- Majority: Sotomayor, joined by Roberts, Kennedy, Breyer, Alito, Kagan
- Concurrence: Thomas (in judgment)
- Concurrence: Ginsburg (in judgment)
- Gorsuch took no part in the consideration or decision of the case.

Lewis v. Clarke, 581 U.S. 155 (2017), is a case in which the Supreme Court of the United States ruled 8–0 that tribal sovereign immunity does not apply in a suit against a tribal employee in his individual capacity, and an indemnification provision cannot extend tribal sovereign immunity to cases in which it would otherwise not apply. Justice Sonia Sotomayor delivered the majority opinion. Justice Clarence Thomas and Justice Ruth Bader Ginsburg each wrote concurring opinions that both said that tribal sovereign immunity does not apply in suits arising from commercial activity off of tribal territory. Justice Neil Gorsuch was not involved in the discussion or decision of this case.
