= Ziglar v. Abbasi =

- Supreme Court of the United States

Argued January 18, 2017 Decided June 19, 2017
- Full case name: James W. Ziglar, et al., Petitioners v. Ahmer Iqbal Abbasi, et al.
- Docket nos.: 15-1358; 15-1359; 15-1363
- Citations: 582 U.S. 120 (more) 137 S. Ct. 1843; 198 L. Ed. 2d 290; 2017 WL 2621317; 2017 U.S. LEXIS 3874

Case history
- Prior: Federal defendants dismissed, Turkmen v. Ashcroft, 915 F. Supp. 2d 314 (E.D.N.Y. 2013), reversed sub. nom., Turkmen v. Hasty, 789 F.3d 218 (2d Cir. 2015), rehearing en banc denied, 808 F.3d 197 (2d Cir. 2015); cert. granted, 137 S. Ct. 293 (2016).

Holding
- A Bivens-type remedy should not be extended to the claims challenging the confinement conditions imposed on respondents pursuant to the formal policy adopted by the Executive Officials in the wake of the September 11 attacks.

Court membership
- Chief Justice John Roberts Associate Justices Anthony Kennedy · Clarence Thomas; Ruth Bader Ginsburg · Stephen Breyer; Samuel Alito · Sonia Sotomayor; Elena Kagan · Neil Gorsuch

Case opinions
- Majority: Kennedy (Parts I, II, III, IV–A, and V), joined by Roberts, Thomas, Alito
- Plurality: Kennedy (Part IV–B), joined by Roberts, Alito
- Concurrence: Thomas (in part and in judgment)
- Dissent: Breyer, joined by Ginsburg
- Sotomayor, Kagan, and Gorsuch took no part in the consideration or decision of the case.

Ziglar v. Abbasi, 582 U.S. 120 (2017), is a Supreme Court of the United States case in which the Court determined, by a vote of 4–2, that non-U.S. citizens detained in the aftermath of the September 11 attacks cannot recover monetary damages from high level federal officials for the conditions of their confinement. The case was consolidated with Hastey v. Abbasi, and Ashcroft v. Abbasi. It was argued on January 18, 2017.

The class action civil lawsuit was filed by the Center for Constitutional Rights (CCR) against the then-Attorney General John Ashcroft, FBI Director Robert Mueller, former INS Commissioner James Ziglar, and employees of the Metropolitan Detention Center (MDC) in Brooklyn, New York, on the behalf of a number of Muslim, South Asian, and Arab non-citizens who, under the pretext of immigration violations, were held in detention for several months.

== Background ==
During the immediate U.S. government response to the September 11 attacks, federal officials sought out and detained illegally present aliens, arresting 762 in all, 60% in the New York area. Aliens "of high interest" to national security would not be deported but were instead "held until cleared" by the Federal Bureau of Investigation. 84 of these aliens were held by the MDC.

On April 17, 2002, plaintiffs sued in the United States District Court for the Eastern District of New York, alleging that the United States Department of Justice and MDC's behavior violated both the Equal Protection Clause and the substantive due process clause, and that they had a right to sue under an implied cause of action created by Bivens v. Six Unknown Named Agents (1971).

The lawsuit charges that the Immigration and Naturalization Service unlawfully held the plaintiffs several months after the completion of immigration cases brought against them to allow the FBI to investigate potential links to terrorism, an alleged violation of their First, Fourth, and Fifth Amendment rights. The suit additionally alleges that the conditions of detainment of these prisoners, as well as the length of detainment, violated their rights, as prisoners were held in the Administrative Maximum Special Housing Unit (ADMAX SHU); deprived contact with their attorneys, families, and friends; prevented from the practice of their religions; and treated inhumanely in various ways, including being verbally and physically abused. David D. Cole, a professor at Georgetown University Law Center, is one of the attorneys on the case. Plaintiffs' trial attorney from CCR was Rachel Meeropol, a granddaughter of Julius and Ethel Rosenberg.

On June 14, 2006, U.S. District Judge John Gleeson refused to dismiss the plaintiffs’ substantive due process and equal protection claims. In February 2008, the case was reviewed by the United States Court of Appeals for the Second Circuit, including then-Circuit Judge Sonia Sotomayor. On December 18, 2009, a two judge panel of the Second Circuit affirmed in an unsigned per curiam decision, with Sotomayor not participating due to her elevation to the Supreme Court of the United States. The Second Circuit remanded to Judge Gleeson for further consideration under the new pleading standards created by Ashcroft v. Iqbal (2009), a separate case regarding conditions at the MDC.

On November 3, 2009, the Center for Constitutional Rights announced that the six Metropolitan Detention Center plaintiffs had settled their claims against the United States for 1.26 million dollars.

Plaintiffs eventually filed four amended complaints, incorporating by reference April and December 2003 United States Department of Justice Office of the Inspector General reports investigating the abuses at MDC. On January 15, 2013, Judge Gleeson dismissed all claims against the federal DOJ defendants but denied the MDC defendants' motions to dismiss the constitutional conditions of confinement claims, the unreasonable strip search claim, and the conspiracy claim.

On June 17, 2015, the Second Circuit ruled that the case could proceed. Second Circuit Judges Rosemary S. Pooler and Richard Wesley affirmed Judge Gleeson with regard to the MDC defendants but reversed with regard to his dismissal of the claims against the DOJ defendants, over dissenting Judge Reena Raggi's argument that the DOJ defendants were entitled to qualified immunity. On December 11, 2015, a judge's request for rehearing en banc was denied by an equally divided circuit, with Judges Raggi, Dennis Jacobs, José A. Cabranes, Peter W. Hall, Debra Ann Livingston and Christopher F. Droney dissenting.

== Supreme Court ==
On February 29 and April 1, 2016, Circuit Justice Ruth Bader Ginsburg granted the Solicitor General of the United States’s applications to extend the deadline to file a petition for a writ of certiorari. On October 11, 2016, the Supreme Court agreed to review the case, with Justices Sotomayor and Elena Kagan recusing themselves. Commentators were not optimistic for the plaintiffs, noting that the Supreme Court had granted all eight of the government's most recent requests to review counterterrorism cases it had lost below, and that the plaintiffs had never then won. On January 18, 2017, one hour of oral argument was heard, where Ian Heath Gershengorn, the acting Solicitor General of the United States, appeared for the federal petitioners, a private attorney appeared for the MDC Warden, and the CCR’s Meeropol appeared for the detainees.

=== Opinion of the Court ===
On June 19, 2017, the Supreme Court delivered judgment in favor of the federal officials, reversing in part, vacating in part, and remanding by a vote of 4-2. Justice Anthony Kennedy, joined fully by Chief Justice John Roberts and Justice Samuel Alito, and partially by Justice Clarence Thomas, found that the implied cause of action created by Bivens v. Six Unknown Named Agents (1971) should not be extended to reach the federal officials' detention policy.

The Court began by recounting the history of the Bivens remedy, noting that the Court has since only extended it twice, in 1979 for gender discrimination and in 1980 for cruel and unusual punishment. Calling that era an "ancien regime", the Court explained that it is now more mindful of separation of powers by looking for clear legislative intent before allowing claimants to seek damages.

If a claim arises in a new context to Bivens, then some special factor must be identified that makes the judiciary better suited than the legislature to decide that there is a new cause of action. The Court first found that the claims regarding the federal government's detention policy were in a new context because they bore little resemblance to familiar Bivens claims. Next, the Court found that there was no special factor calling for judicial intervention, highlighting that the claimed damages regard national security decisions by high level Executive Branch officials in response to a terrorist attack, that there was Congressional silence in response, and that alternative relief was available to the detainees through an injunction or the writ of habeas corpus. As such, the detainees could not sue the federal officials.

The Court next found that the claims of detainee abuse against MDC Warden Hasty were in a new context to Bivens because prior precedent regarded the prison abuse of convicted felons in violation of the Eighth Amendment, rather than the detainees’ claims under the Fifth Amendment. The majority remanded the claims against Warden Hastey to the lower court for it to analyze any special factors. Finally, the Court granted each defendant qualified immunity on the civil conspiracy claim, acknowledging without resolving the longstanding circuit split regarding the impossibility of conspiring within a single government department.

=== Justice Thomas's concurrence in part and concurrence in judgment ===
Thomas refused to join the paragraph in the opinion of the Court remanding the lawsuit against MDC Warden Hasty. Thomas also expressed concern about the precedents which establish the doctrine of qualified immunity, which he considered at odds with the common-law text of the statute and "substitute[s] our own policy preferences for the mandates of Congress."

=== Justice Breyer's dissent ===
Justice Stephen Breyer, joined by Justice Ruth Bader Ginsburg, dissented. Breyer disagreed strongly enough to read his dissent aloud from the bench at the opinion announcement.

== See also ==
- List of class action lawsuits
