= Manuel v. Joliet =

- Supreme Court of the United States

Argued October 5, 2016 Decided March 21, 2017
- Full case name: Manuel v. City of Joliet, Illinois, et al.
- Docket no.: 14-9496
- Citations: 580 U.S. ___ (more) 137 S. Ct. 911; 197 L. Ed. 2d 312

Case history
- Prior: Manuel v. Joliet, 590 F. App'x 641 (7th Cir. 2015); cert. granted, 136 S. Ct. 890 (2016).
- Procedural: On writ of certiorari to the United States Court of Appeals for the Seventh Circuit

Holding
- A criminal defendant may challenge his pretrial detention on the ground that it violated the Fourth Amendment.

Court membership
- Chief Justice John Roberts Associate Justices Anthony Kennedy · Clarence Thomas; Ruth Bader Ginsburg · Stephen Breyer; Samuel Alito · Sonia Sotomayor; Elena Kagan

Case opinions
- Majority: Kagan, joined by Roberts, Kennedy, Ginsburg, Breyer, Sotomayor
- Dissent: Thomas
- Dissent: Alito, joined by Thomas

Laws applied
- U.S. Const. amend. IV

Manuel v. Joliet, 580 U.S. ___ (2017), was a case in which the United States Supreme Court held that a criminal defendant may bring a claim under the Fourth Amendment of the United States Constitution to challenge pretrial confinement. All other issues, including the claim's timeliness, was left to the court below. In a 6–2 majority opinion written by Justice Elena Kagan, the Court stated that "the Fourth Amendment governs a claim for unlawful pretrial detention even beyond the start of legal process". This decision reversed and remanded the judgment of the Seventh Circuit Court of Appeals. Justice Clarence Thomas wrote a dissenting opinion. Justice Thomas also joined a dissenting opinion by Justice Samuel Alito.

== Background ==
During a traffic stop, police officers in Joliet, Illinois, searched Elijah Manuel and found a vitamin bottle containing pills. Suspecting the pills to be illegal drugs, the officers conducted a field test, which came back negative for any controlled substance. Still, they arrested Manuel and took him to the police station. There, an evidence technician tested the pills and got the same negative result, but claimed in his report that one of the pills tested "positive for the probable presence of ecstasy." An arresting officer also reported that, based on his "training and experience," he "knew the pills to be ecstasy." On the basis of those false statements, another officer filed a sworn complaint charging Manuel with unlawful possession of a controlled substance. Relying exclusively on that complaint, a county court judge found probable cause to detain Manuel pending trial.

While Manuel was in jail, the Illinois police laboratory tested the seized pills and reported that they contained no controlled substances. But Manuel remained in custody, spending a total of 48 days in pretrial detention. More than two years after his arrest, but less than two years after his criminal case was dismissed, Manuel filed a Section 1983 lawsuit against Joliet and several of its police officers (collectively, the City), alleging that his arrest and detention violated the Fourth Amendment. The District Court dismissed Manuel's suit, holding, first, that the applicable two-year statute of limitations barred his unlawful arrest claim, and, second, that under binding Circuit precedent, pretrial detention following the start of legal process (here, the judge's probable-cause determination) could not give rise to a Fourth Amendment claim. Manuel appealed the dismissal of his unlawful detention claim; the Seventh Circuit Court of Appeals affirmed.

== See also ==
- List of United States Supreme Court cases
- Lists of United States Supreme Court cases by volume
- List of United States Supreme Court cases by the Roberts Court
