= Maslenjak v. United States =

- Supreme Court of the United States

Argued April 26, 2017 Decided June 22, 2017
- Full case name: Divna Maslenjak, Petitioner v. United States
- Docket no.: 16-309
- Citations: 582 U.S. 335 (more) 137 S. Ct. 1918; 198 L. Ed. 2d 460
- Argument: Oral argument
- Opinion announcement: Opinion announcement

Case history
- Prior: Conviction affirmed, 821 F.3d 675 (6th Cir. 2016); cert. granted, 137 S. Ct. 809 (2017).

Holding
- False statements made during the naturalization process can lead to the revocation of citizenship only if they played some role in the citizen's naturalization.

Court membership
- Chief Justice John Roberts Associate Justices Anthony Kennedy · Clarence Thomas; Ruth Bader Ginsburg · Stephen Breyer; Samuel Alito · Sonia Sotomayor; Elena Kagan · Neil Gorsuch

Case opinions
- Majority: Kagan, joined by Roberts, Kennedy, Ginsburg, Breyer, Sotomayor
- Concurrence: Gorsuch (in part), joined by Thomas
- Concurrence: Alito (in judgment)

Laws applied
- 18 U.S.C. § 1425(a)

Maslenjak v. United States, 582 U.S. 335 (2017), is a United States Supreme Court case in which the Court held that the government cannot revoke the citizenship of a naturalized U.S. citizen based on an immaterial false statement made by the citizen in their naturalization application.

== Background ==
Divna Maslenjak is a Bosnian Serb native to an area of Bosnia dominated by Muslims. During the Bosnian War her husband, Ratko, was an officer in Vidoje Blagojević's brigade of the Army of Republika Srpska, units of which committed acts of genocide, including the Srebrenica massacre.

In April 1998, Maslenjak met with a United States Immigration and Naturalization Service (INS) officer in Belgrade to seek refugee status. There, under oath, Maslenjak falsely claimed that her husband had evaded conscription during the war by fleeing the country, and that as such the family were now subject to persecutions from both Serbs and Muslims. Maslenjak and her family were granted refugee status based on her falsehoods, and they immigrated to the United States in September 2000.

ICE eventually discovered records of Ratko's war service, so in December 2006 he was arrested and charged with lying on a government document. One week later, Maslenjak filed a Form N-400 Application for Naturalization, in which she falsely stated that she had never lied to any U.S. government official. Maslenjak became a U.S. citizen on August 3, 2007.

After her husband was convicted and made subject to deportation, Maslenjak filed a Form I-130 petition for her husband's asylum, and she then gave testimony admitting that she had lied about her husband's war service to gain refugee status. Maslenjak was then indicted for procuring her naturalization contrary to law in violation of 18 U.S.C. § 1425(a). The jury was instructed that her lies did not need to have influenced her naturalization if she had violated a separate prohibition on lying to the government, 18 U.S.C. § 1015(a).

On April 17, 2014, a jury convicted Divna Maslenjak of knowingly procuring naturalization contrary to law and U.S. District Judge Benita Y. Pearson then granted the government's request to revoke Maslenjak's citizenship. On April 7, 2016, the United States Court of Appeals for the Sixth Circuit affirmed the conviction, in which Judge S. Thomas Anderson was joined by Judge David McKeague, with Julia Smith Gibbons concurring. By approving of the instructions received by the jury, the Sixth Circuit created a circuit split between itself and the First, Seventh, Ninth and Fourth Circuits.

== Supreme Court ==
At oral arguments on April 26, 2017, several justices were openly critical of the government's broad reading of the statute.

=== Opinion of the Court ===
On June 22, 2017, the Supreme Court delivered judgment in favor of the immigrant, voting unanimously to vacate and remand to the lower court. Justice Elena Kagan wrote the opinion of the Court, joined by Chief Justice John Roberts, and Justices Ruth Bader Ginsburg, Stephen Breyer, and Sonia Sotomayor. The Court adopted the "most natural" reading of the statutory text, which, according to the "rules of language" implicitly required some causality between the illegal act and procuring naturalization.

To make this causal link, the Court announced several objective tests juries must apply including: whether the falsehood concerned a fact that simply disqualified the immigrant for citizenship, or, whether the falsehood was both "sufficiently relevant" to a citizenship qualification to prompt an immigration official to investigate further and that such an investigation would have predictably led to a disqualifying fact. The Court also posited that the accused could raise an affirmative defense that he is actually qualified for citizenship. The case was remanded to determine if Maslenjak had been harmed by the erroneous jury instructions.

=== Justice Gorsuch's concurrence in part ===
Justice Neil Gorsuch, joined by Justice Clarence Thomas, concurred in part and concurred in the judgment. Gorsuch agreed with the majority's interpretation of the statute, but did not approve of the new multipart test the Court announced, and he chided the majority for not waiting for lower courts to develop standards in the first instance.

=== Justice Alito's concurrence in the judgment ===
Justice Samuel Alito, alone, concurred only in the judgment. Instead of a causal requirement, Alito thought the offense included an implied materiality element, and opined that something may be material even if it does not affect an outcome.

== Subsequent developments ==
After being remanded, the Sixth Circuit Court of Appeals heard oral arguments on October 3, 2018. The Court of Appeals delivered its new opinion on November 21, 2019, in which it vacated Maslenjak's convictions and further remanded the case to the district court for a new trial.
