= Murr v. Wisconsin =

- Supreme Court of the United States

Decided June 23, 2017
- Full case name: Murr v. Wisconsin
- Docket no.: 15-214
- Citations: 582 U.S. 383 (more)

Holding
- The reviewing court was correct to analyze the lot owners' property as a single unit in assessing the effect of a governmental action challenged as a regulatory taking.

Court membership
- Chief Justice John Roberts Associate Justices Anthony Kennedy · Clarence Thomas; Ruth Bader Ginsburg · Stephen Breyer; Samuel Alito · Sonia Sotomayor; Elena Kagan · Neil Gorsuch

Case opinions
- Majority: Kennedy
- Dissent: Roberts, joined by Thomas, Alito
- Dissent: Thomas
- Gorsuch took no part in the consideration or decision of the case.

Murr v. Wisconsin, 582 U.S. 383 (2017), was a United States Supreme Court case in which the court held that the reviewing court was correct to analyze the lot owners' property as a single unit in assessing the effect of a governmental action challenged as a regulatory taking.

== Background ==
The St. Croix River, which forms part of the boundary between Wisconsin and Minnesota, is protected under federal, state, and local law. Murr family owned two adjacent lots—Lot E and Lot F—along the lower portion of the river in the town of Troy, Wisconsin. For the area where the Murr family's property was located, state and local regulations prevent the use or sale of adjacent lots under common ownership as separate building sites unless they have at least one acre of land suitable for development. A grandfather clause relaxes this restriction for substandard lots that were in separate ownership from adjacent lands on January 1, 1976, the regulation's effective date.

The Murr family's parents purchased Lots E and F separately in the 1960's, and maintained them under separate ownership until transferring Lot F to the Murr family in 1994 and Lot E to the Murr family in 1995. Both lots are over one acre in size, but because of their topography they each have less than one acre suitable for development. The unification of the lots under common ownership therefore implicated the rules barring their separate sale or development. The Murr family became interested in selling Lot E as part of an improvement plan for the lots, and sought variances from the St. Croix County Board of Adjustment. The Board denied the request, and the state courts affirmed in relevant part. In particular, the State Court of Appeals found that the local ordinance effectively merged the lots, so the Murr family could only sell or build on the single combined lot.

The Murr family filed suit, alleging that the regulations worked a regulatory taking that deprived them of all, or practically all, of the use of Lot E. The County Circuit Court granted summary judgment to the State, explaining that the Murr family had other options to enjoy and use their property, including eliminating the cabin and building a new residence on either lot or across both. The court also found that the Murr family had not been deprived of all economic value of their property, because the decrease in market value of the unified lots was less than 10 percent. The State Court of Appeals affirmed, holding that the takings analysis properly focused on Lots E and F together and that, using that framework, the merger regulations did not effect a taking.

== Opinion of the Court ==
=== Majority ===
The Court held 5-3 that the land's "denominator," for the takings analysis, should aggregate the two lots of land to judge them as a single plot of land. Justice Kennedy wrote for the majority and endorsed a three-part denominator test weighing “[1] the treatment of the land under state and local law; [2] the physical characteristics of the land; and [3] the prospective value of the regulated land.”

Based on this test, the majority held that because [1] Wisconsin law merged the plots of land; [2] the lots were contiguous and covered in rough terrain; [3] the aggregate value of two plots together was greater than the sum of the two separated lots' values, that the lot of land should be merged.

=== Dissent ===
The dissent agreed that the regulations on the Murrs' land was not a taking. However, Chief Justice John Roberts' dissent warned that the majority's prescribed denominator test gave the government too much leverage and discretion in takings questions. They emphasized that the government's interest is already considered in legal questions on whether takings occurred, and so considering the government's interest again in assessing the "denominator" of land would threaten individuals' property rights.
