= Nelson v. Colorado =

- Supreme Court of the United States

Argued January 9, 2017 Decided April 19, 2017
- Full case name: Shannon Nelson, Petitioner v. Colorado; Louis A. Madden, Petitioner v. Colorado
- Docket no.: 15-1256
- Citations: 581 U.S. 128 (more) 137 S. Ct. 1249; 197 L. Ed. 2d 611
- Argument: Oral argument
- Opinion announcement: Opinion announcement

Case history
- Prior: People v. Nelson, 2013 COA 58, 369 P.3d 625; reversed, 2015 CO 68, 362 P.3d 1070; People v. Madden, 2013 COA 56, 399 P.3d 706; reversed, 2015 CO 69, 364 P.3d 866; cert. granted, 137 S. Ct. 30 (2016).

Holding
- A state has no right to keep fines and other money collected based on an invalid conviction.

Court membership
- Chief Justice John Roberts Associate Justices Anthony Kennedy · Clarence Thomas; Ruth Bader Ginsburg · Stephen Breyer; Samuel Alito · Sonia Sotomayor; Elena Kagan · Neil Gorsuch

Case opinions
- Majority: Ginsburg, joined by Roberts, Kennedy, Breyer, Sotomayor, Kagan
- Concurrence: Alito (in judgment)
- Dissent: Thomas
- Gorsuch took no part in the consideration or decision of the case.

Laws applied
- U.S. Const. amend. XIV

Nelson v. Colorado, 581 U.S. 128 (2017), is a decision by the Supreme Court of the United States. In a 7-1 decision written by Justice Ruth Bader Ginsburg, the Court held that a state has no right to keep fines and other money collected based on an invalid conviction. Justice Samuel Alito wrote an opinion concurring with the judgment, Justice Clarence Thomas wrote a dissenting opinion, and Justice Neil Gorsuch did not take part in the consideration or decision of the case.

== Background ==
The case combined lawsuits by two petitioners: Shannon Nelson and Louis Madden. Nelson was convicted of child abuse and sentenced to 20 years to life, and assessed $8,192 in various fees and restitution. Madden was convicted of attempting to patronize a prostituted child and attempted sexual assault, and received an indeterminate sentence and had to pay $4,413. Both convictions were overturned on appeal and the petitioners were considered factually innocent.

Colorado's Exoneration Act requires that a person who is exonerated after being convicted must petition a Colorado District Court for an order entitling them to receive compensation.

On January 9, 2017, oral arguments were heard, where Professor Stuart Banner appeared for the accused, and the Colorado Solicitor General appeared for that state.

== Opinion of the Court ==
On April 19, 2017, the Supreme Court delivered judgment in favor of the accused, voting 7–1 to reverse and remand to the state court. Justice Ruth Bader Ginsburg wrote the opinion of the Court, joined by Chief Justice John Roberts, Justice Kennedy Anthony Kennedy and Stephen Breyer, Sonia Sotomayor, and Elena Kagan. This decision held that the part of the law regarding "any fine, penalty, court costs, or restitution imposed upon and paid by the wrongfully convicted person" violated the Fourteenth Amendment's guarantee of due process. The petitioners are entitled to prompt repayment of the money that they paid in regard to the wrongful conviction.

Justice Samuel Alito concurred only in the judgment.

Justice Clarence Thomas dissented.
