= Weaver v. Massachusetts =

- Supreme Court of the United States

Argued April 19, 2017 Decided June 22, 2017
- Full case name: Weaver v. Massachusetts
- Docket no.: 16-240
- Citations: 582 U.S. 286 (more)

Holding
- In the context of a public-trial violation during jury selection, where the error is neither preserved nor raised on direct review but is raised later via an ineffective-assistance-of-counsel claim, the defendant must demonstrate prejudice to secure a new trial.

Court membership
- Chief Justice John Roberts Associate Justices Anthony Kennedy · Clarence Thomas; Ruth Bader Ginsburg · Stephen Breyer; Samuel Alito · Sonia Sotomayor; Elena Kagan · Neil Gorsuch

Case opinions
- Majority: Kennedy, joined by Roberts, Thomas, Ginsburg, Sotomayor, Gorsuch
- Concurrence: Thomas, joined by Gorsuch
- Concurrence: Alito (in judgment), joined by Gorsuch
- Dissent: Breyer, joined by Kagan

Weaver v. Massachusetts, 582 U.S. 286 (2017), was a United States Supreme Court case in which the court held that in the context of a public-trial violation during jury selection, where the error is neither preserved nor raised on direct review but is raised later via an ineffective-assistance-of-counsel claim, the defendant must demonstrate prejudice to secure a new trial.

== Background ==
When Kentel Myrone Weaver was tried in a Massachusetts trial court, the courtroom could not accommodate all the potential jurors. As a result, for two days of jury selection, an officer of the court excluded from the courtroom any member of the public who was not a potential juror, including Weaver's mother and her minister. Defense counsel neither objected to the closure at trial nor raised the issue on direct review. Weaver was convicted of murder and a related charge. Five years later, he filed a motion for a new trial in state court, arguing that his attorney had provided ineffective assistance by failing to object to the courtroom closure. The trial court ruled that he was not entitled to relief. The Massachusetts Supreme Judicial Court affirmed. Although it recognized that the violation of the right to public trial was a structural error, it rejected Weaver's ineffective-assistance claim because he had not shown prejudice.
