= Beckles v. United States =

- Supreme Court of the United States

Argued November 28, 2016 Decided March 6, 2017
- Full case name: Travis Beckles, Petitioner v. United States
- Docket no.: 15-8544
- Citations: 580 U.S. ___ (more) 137 S. Ct. 886; 197 L. Ed. 2d 145

Case history
- Prior: United States v. Beckles, 565 F.3d 832, 846 (11th Cir. 2009), cert denied, 558 U.S. 906 (2009); cert. granted and subsequent opinion of the court of appeals vacated, Beckles v. United States, 576 U.S. ___ (2015); Beckles v. United States, 616 F. App'x 415, 416 (2015) (per curiam).
- Procedural: On writ of certiorari to the United States Court of Appeals for the Eleventh Circuit

Holding
- The Federal Sentencing Guidelines, including § 4B1.2(a)'s residual clause, are not subject to vagueness challenges under the Due Process Clause.

Court membership
- Chief Justice John Roberts Associate Justices Anthony Kennedy · Clarence Thomas; Ruth Bader Ginsburg · Stephen Breyer; Samuel Alito · Sonia Sotomayor; Elena Kagan

Case opinions
- Majority: Thomas, joined by Roberts, Kennedy, Breyer, Alito
- Concurrence: Kennedy
- Concurrence: Ginsburg (concurring in judgment)
- Concurrence: Sotomayor (concurring in judgment)
- Kagan took no part in the consideration or decision of the case.

Laws applied
- U.S. Const. amend. V

Beckles v. United States, 580 U.S. ___ (2017), was a case in which the United States Supreme Court evaluated whether the residual clause in the United States Advisory Sentencing Guidelines was unconstitutionally vague.

On November 28, 2016, oral arguments were heard, where a private attorney appeared for the accused, Deputy U.S. Solicitor General Michael Dreeben appeared for the government, and a professor appeared as a court appointed amicus curiae to defend the lower court's opinion.

On March 6, 2017, the Supreme Court delivered judgment in favor of the government, voting unanimously to affirm the lower court. In an opinion written by Justice Clarence Thomas, the Court held that "the advisory Guidelines are not subject to vagueness challenges under the Due Process Clause" of the Fifth Amendment of the United States Constitution.

Justice Anthony Kennedy wrote a brief concurrence.

Justice Ruth Bader Ginsburg concurred only in the judgment, stressing that the commentary to the Guidelines specifically mentioned Beckles' offense.

Justice Sonia Sotomayor also concurred only in the judgment, agreeing with Ginsburg that the commentary to the Guidelines applied to Beckles, but going on to opine that the Guidelines as a whole may still be unconstitutionally vague.

== See also ==
- List of United States Supreme Court cases
- Lists of United States Supreme Court cases by volume
- List of United States Supreme Court cases by the Roberts Court
