= 2016 term opinions of the Supreme Court of the United States =

October 2016 to October 2017 opinions

The 2016 term of the Supreme Court of the United States began October 3, 2016, and concluded October 1, 2017. The table below illustrates which opinion was filed by each justice in each case and which justices joined each opinion.

== Table key ==
Delivered the court's opinion

Joined the court's opinion

Filed a concurrence

Joined a concurrence

Filed a dissent

Joined a dissent

Filed a concurrence/dissent

Joined a concurrence/dissent

Did not participate in the decision
- Decisions that do not note an argument date were decided without oral argument. Decisions that do not note a justice delivering the court's opinion are per curiam.
- Multiple concurrences and dissents within a case are numbered, with joining votes numbered accordingly. Justices frequently join multiple opinions in a single case; each vote is subdivided accordingly.
- An asterisk ( * ) in the court's opinion denotes that it was only a majority in part or a plurality. An asterisk in a joining vote denotes that the justice joined it only in part.
- A dash ( - ) denotes that the justice voted without filing or joining an opinion.

== 2016 term opinions ==
#	Case name and citation	Argued	Decided	Roberts	Kennedy	Thomas	Ginsburg	Breyer	Alito	Sotomayor	Kagan	Gorsuch
1	Bosse v. Oklahoma, 580 U.S. 1		October 11, 2016									
2	Bravo-Fernandez v. United States, 580 U.S. 5	October 4, 2016	November 29, 2016									
3	State Farm Fire & Casualty Co. v. United States ex rel. Rigsby, 580 U.S. 26	November 1, 2016	December 6, 2016									
4	Salman v. United States, 580 U.S. 39	October 5, 2016	December 6, 2016									
5	Samsung Electronics Co. v. Apple Inc., 580 U.S. 53	October 11, 2016	December 6, 2016									
6	Shaw v. United States, 580 U.S. 63	October 4, 2016	December 12, 2016									
7	White v. Pauly, 580 U.S. 73		January 9, 2017									
8	Lightfoot v. Cendant Mortgage Corp., 580 U.S. 82	November 8, 2016	January 18, 2017									
9	Buck v. Davis, 580 U.S. 100	October 5, 2016	February 22, 2017									
10	Life Technologies Corp. v. Promega Corp., 580 U.S. 140	December 6, 2016	February 22, 2017			*			*			
11	Fry v. Napoleon Community Schools, 580 U.S. 154	October 31, 2016	February 22, 2017									
12	Bethune-Hill v. Virginia State Bd. of Elections, 580 U.S. 178	December 5, 2016	March 1, 2017									
13	Pena-Rodriguez v. Colorado, 580 U.S. 206	October 11, 2016	March 6, 2017	2		1 / 2			2			
14	Beckles v. United States, 580 U.S. 256	November 28, 2016	March 6, 2017		1		2			3		
15	Rippo v. Baker, 580 U.S. 285		March 6, 2017									
16	NLRB v. SW General, Inc., 580 U.S. 288	November 7, 2016	March 21, 2017									
17	SCA Hygiene Products Aktiebolag v. First Quality Baby Products, LLC, 580 U.S. 328	November 1, 2016	March 21, 2017									
18	Manuel v. Joliet, 580 U.S. 357	October 5, 2016	March 21, 2017			1 / 2			2			
19	Endrew F. v. Douglas County School Dist. RE–1, 580 U.S. 386	January 11, 2017	March 22, 2017									
20	Star Athletica, L. L. C. v. Varsity Brands, Inc., 580 U.S. 405	October 31, 2016	March 22, 2017									
21	Czyzewski v. Jevic Holding Corp., 580 U.S. 451	December 7, 2016	March 22, 2017									
22	Moore v. Texas, 581 U.S. ___	November 29, 2016	March 28, 2017									
23	Expressions Hair Design v. Schneiderman, 581 U.S. ___	January 10, 2017	March 29, 2017					1	2	2		
24	Dean v. United States, 581 U.S. ___	February 28, 2017	April 3, 2017									
25	McLane Co. v. EEOC, 581 U.S. ___	February 21, 2017	April 3, 2017									
26	Coventry Health Care of Mo., Inc. v. Nevils, 581 U.S. ___	March 1, 2017	April 18, 2017									
27	Goodyear Tire & Rubber Co. v. Haeger, 581 U.S. ___	January 10, 2017	April 18, 2017									
28	Manrique v. United States, 581 U.S. ___	October 11, 2016	April 19, 2017									
29	Nelson v. Colorado, 581 U.S. ___	January 9, 2017	April 19, 2017									
30	Lewis v. Clarke, 581 U.S. ___	January 9, 2017	April 25, 2017			1	2					
31	Venezuela v. Helmerich & Payne Int'l Drilling Co., 581 U.S. ___	November 2, 2016	May 1, 2017									
32	Bank of America Corp. v. Miami, 581 U.S. ___	November 8, 2016	May 1, 2017									
33	Howell v. Howell, 581 U.S. ___	March 20, 2017	May 15, 2017									
34	Midland Funding, LLC v. Johnson, 581 U.S. ___	January 17, 2017	May 15, 2017									
35	Kindred Nursing Centers, L. P. v. Clark, 581 U.S. ___	February 22, 2017	May 15, 2017									
36	TC Heartland LLC v. Kraft Foods Group Brands LLC, 581 U.S. ___	March 27, 2017	May 22, 2017									
37	Water Splash, Inc. v. Menon, 581 U.S. ___	March 22, 2017	May 22, 2017									
38	Cooper v. Harris, 581 U.S. ___	December 5, 2016	May 22, 2017									
39	Impression Products, Inc. v. Lexmark Int'l, Inc., 581 U.S. ___	March 21, 2017	May 30, 2017									
40	Esquivel-Quintana v. Sessions, 581 U.S. ___	February 27, 2017	May 30, 2017									
41	BNSF Railway Co. v. Tyrrell, 581 U.S. ___	April 25, 2017	May 30, 2017									
42	County of Los Angeles v. Mendez, 581 U.S. ___	March 22, 2017	May 30, 2017									
43	Town of Chester v. Laroe Estates, Inc., 581 U.S. ___	April 17, 2017	June 5, 2017									
44	Honeycutt v. United States, 581 U.S. ___	March 29, 2017	June 5, 2017									
45	Kokesh v. SEC, 581 U.S. ___	April 18, 2017	June 5, 2017									
46	Advocate Health Care Network v. Stapleton, 581 U.S. ___	March 27, 2017	June 5, 2017									
47	North Carolina v. Covington (2017), 581 U.S. ___		June 5, 2017									
48	Sandoz Inc. v. Amgen Inc., 582 U.S. ___	April 26, 2017	June 12, 2017									
49	Microsoft Corp. v. Baker, 582 U.S. ___	March 21, 2017	June 12, 2017									
50	Sessions v. Morales-Santana, 582 U.S. ___	November 9, 2016	June 12, 2017									
51	Henson v. Santander Consumer USA Inc., 582 U.S. ___	April 18, 2017	June 12, 2017									
52	Virginia v. LeBlanc, 582 U.S. ___		June 12, 2017									
53	Packingham v. North Carolina, 582 U.S. ___	February 27, 2017	June 19, 2017									
54	Ziglar v. Abbasi, 582 U.S. ___	January 18, 2017	June 19, 2017		*	*						
55	McWilliams v. Dunn, 582 U.S. ___	April 24, 2017	June 19, 2017									
56	Matal v. Tam, 582 U.S. ___	January 18, 2017	June 19, 2017		* / 1	* / 2	* / 1		*	* / 1	* / 1	
57	Bristol-Myers Squibb Co. v. Superior Court of Cal., 582 U.S. ___	April 25, 2017	June 19, 2017									
58	Jenkins v. Hutton, 582 U.S. ___		June 19, 2017									
59	Weaver v. Massachusetts, 582 U.S. ___	April 19, 2017	June 22, 2017			1			2			1 / 2
60	Turner v. United States, 582 U.S. ___	March 29, 2017	June 22, 2017									
61	Maslenjak v. United States, 582 U.S. ___	April 26, 2017	June 22, 2017			2			1			2
62	Jae Lee v. United States, 582 U.S. ___	March 28, 2017	June 23, 2017						*			
63	Murr v. Wisconsin, 582 U.S. ___	March 20, 2017	June 23, 2017	1		1 / 2			1			
64	Perry v. Merit Systems Protection Board, 582 U.S. ___	April 17, 2017	June 23, 2017									
65	Trinity Lutheran Church of Columbia, Inc. v. Comer, 582 U.S. ___	April 19, 2017	June 26, 2017	*		* / 1 / 3		2				* / 1 / 3
66	California Public Employees' Retirement System v. ANZ Securities, Inc., 582 U.S. ___	April 17, 2017	June 26, 2017									
67	Davila v. Davis, 582 U.S. ___	April 24, 2017	June 26, 2017									
68	Hernandez v. Mesa, 582 U.S. ___		June 26, 2017			1	2	2				
69	Pavan v. Smith, 582 U.S. ___		June 26, 2017									
70	Trump. v. International Refugee Assistance Project, 582 U.S. ___		June 26, 2017									
#	Case name and citation	Argued	Decided	Roberts	Kennedy	Thomas	Ginsburg	Breyer	Alito	Sotomayor	Kagan	Gorsuch

== 2016 term membership and statistics ==
This was the twelfth term of Chief Justice Roberts's tenure and the first term for Justice Gorsuch. The Court began its term with a vacant seat because the Senate had not yet confirmed a replacement for Justice Antonin Scalia following his death on February 13, 2016. The seat was eventually filled by Neil Gorsuch on April 7, 2017.

Justice		Appointment history		Agreement with judgment		Opinions filed				
Seniority	Name	President	Date confirmed	%	#					Total
Chief Justice	John Roberts	George W. Bush	September 29, 2005	92.8%	64/69	8	0	0	2	10
Associate Justice	Anthony Kennedy	Ronald Reagan	February 18, 1988	95.7%	67/70	8	2	0	0	10
Associate Justice	Clarence Thomas	George H. W. Bush	October 23, 1991	77.1%	54/70	7	13	3	9	32
Associate Justice	Ruth Bader Ginsburg	Bill Clinton	August 10, 1993	84.3%	59/70	8	5	2	2	17
Associate Justice	Stephen Breyer	Bill Clinton	August 3, 1994	90%	63/70	8	3	0	6	17
Associate Justice	Samuel Alito	George W. Bush	January 31, 2006	82.9%	58/70	7	7	1	3	18
Associate Justice	Sonia Sotomayor	Barack Obama	August 6, 2009	88.4%	61/69	7	3	1	4	15
Associate Justice	Elena Kagan	Barack Obama	August 7, 2010	92.6%	63/68	7	0	0	1	8
Associate Justice	Neil Gorsuch	Donald Trump	April 7, 2017	77.8%	14/18	1	2	0	2	5
Notes on statistics: Opinion counts only include the bench opinions listed above; opinions relating to orders or in-chambers opinions are not included.; Agreement with the Court's judgment does not guarantee agreement with the reasoning expressed in its opinion. A justice is not considered in agreement if they dissented even in part. Agreement percentages are based only on the listed cases in which a justice participated and are rounded to the nearest one-tenth of one percentage point.						Totals				
Notes on statistics: Opinion counts only include the bench opinions listed above; opinions relating to orders or in-chambers opinions are not included.; Agreement with the Court's judgment does not guarantee agreement with the reasoning expressed in its opinion. A justice is not considered in agreement if they dissented even in part. Agreement percentages are based only on the listed cases in which a justice participated and are rounded to the nearest one-tenth of one percentage point.						61	35	7	29	132
