= EverQuote =

Online insurance marketplace

EverQuote, Inc.
- Formerly: AdHarmonics
- Type: Public
- Traded as: Nasdaq: EVER (Class A); Russell 2000 Index component
- Founded: 2011; 15 years ago
- Founders: Seth Birnbaum; Tomas Revesz
- Headquarters: Cambridge, Massachusetts, United States
- Key people: Jayme Mendal (CEO); Joseph Sanborn (CFO); David Brainard (CTO); Jesse Wolf (chief product officer)
- Website: everquote.com

EverQuote, Inc. is an online insurance marketplace founded in 2011 and based in Cambridge, Massachusetts.

== Description ==
EverQuote began as a marketplace for car insurance but has since expanded to home, health, and life insurance.

EverQuote matches insurance-seekers with companies that others with similar profiles preferred in the past. EverQuote does not directly quote insurance rates. Instead, it selects a few companies whose insurance products were bought by similar drivers in the past, and gives those companies the insurance-seeker's contact information. The company representatives then will quote prices for products they offer.

The company's revenue model is lead generation. Its service is free to insurance-seekers. According to the Boston Globe, "EverQuote collects referral fees from insurance providers when customers buy policies, but it doesn’t allow companies to pay to be included in its recommendations."

== History ==
EverQuote was founded in Cambridge, Massachusetts, by Seth Birnbaum and Tomas Revesz, who met at MIT. Originally named AdHarmonics when it began in 2008, the company changed its name to Everquote in 2011, after creating its online insurance marketplace.

EverQuote was a part of the Cogo Labs incubator program run by the Massachusetts-based venture capital firm Link Ventures. In 2013, the company moved to its own office space.

In May 2015, MicroStrategy founder Sanju Bansal and Vestmark CEO John Lunny became members of the board of directors. In October 2016, EverQuote received $23 million in Series B funding via Savano Capital Partners, Stratim Capital LLC and Oceanic Partners, and T Capital Partners.

In 2017, Everquote added $13 million to its previous $23M funding. At the same time, they added Mira Wilczek, CEO of Cogo Labs at the time, to their board of directors, where she replaced Jonathan Shapiro. Since 2019, Paul Deninger has served as a board member of EverQuote.

In 2020, following the death of company founder Seth Birnbaum, he was replaced as CEO by the company's president Jayme Mendal.

=== Advertising ===
In 2016, EverQuote began an Internet advertising campaign featuring images of two young employees (not always the same two employees,) with text such as "How 2 math grads are disrupting the insurance industry." This juxtaposition suggested to many that the young people in the photo were founders of Everquote.

In response to controversy over the ads, co-founders Birnbaum and Revesz said that the photos were meant to showcase a "young, diverse" team at EverQuote. In March 2017, Everquote stated that they had paused the ads. Everquote said that future ads would end confusion about the roles of the young employees pictured.

=== EverDrive app ===
In 2016, EverQuote launched a new smartphone app called "EverDrive" to help drivers measure their driving safety, based on five criteria: phone use, speeding, accelerating, cornering and braking. Between 1/4 and 1/3 of drivers using this app upgraded their safety skills, over a period of four months, to earn better scores from the app.

== See also ==
- Online marketplace
