= The Mobile Wave =

2012 technology book by Michael J. Saylor

The Mobile Wave: How Mobile Intelligence Will Change Everything
- 1st edition cover
- Author: Michael J. Saylor
- Language: English
- Subject: Mobile technology, business intelligence
- Genre: Non-fiction; technology
- Publisher: Perseus Books/Vanguard Press
- Publication date: 26 June 2012
- Publication place: United States
- Media type: Print (Hardcover)
- Pages: 291 (1st edition)
- ISBN: 978-1-59315-720-3 1st edition
- OCLC: 813011103
- Dewey Decimal: 004.16
- LC Class: QA76.59 .S39 2012

The Mobile Wave: How Mobile Intelligence Will Change Everything is a 2012 nonfiction book by Michael J. Saylor, founder, chairman, and CEO of MicroStrategy, Inc. The Mobile Wave provides an analysis of then-current trends in mobile technology from the point of view of a scholar of the history of science. The book argues that mobile devices will become essential tools for life in the modern day, changing how businesses operate and how industries and economies are powered.

Saylor appeared on CNN to discuss ideas presented in his book.

== Synopsis ==
Chapter 1 – "The Wave: The Shape of the Wave": Introduces the main themes of the book, including the nature of mobile devices, and how mobile technology will continue to effect industries. This chapter also introduces the claim that an ongoing Information Revolution is the third great revolution to transform society, after the Agricultural and Industrial Revolutions.

Chapter 2 – "Computers: The Evolution to Mobile Computing": Discusses the four historical waves in the history of computing, leading to the a fifth "mobile wave".

Chapter 3 – "Paper: The Demise of Paper": A short history of media delivery systems, ranging from the first clay tablets around 3000 B.C., up to electronic publishing.

Chapter 4 – "Entertainment: The New Universal Screen": How mobile technology has been adapted to display movies, TV programming and video games. The role of advertising is also discussed.

Chapter 5 – "Wallet: A Smarter Wallet and Intelligent Money": A short history of money, payment systems, and banking as they relate to the mobile wave.

Chapter 6 – "Social Networks: A Mobile Social World": How evolving mobile/social applications are changing society and current events.

Chapter 7 – "Medicine: The New Landscape of Global Healthcare": The impact of mobile technology on the medical industry, such as via telemedicine.

Chapter 8 – "Education: Remaking Education for Everyone": How mobile technology has changed the education system.

Chapter 9 – "Developing World: Bootstrapping the Developing World": Discusses purported benefits of mobile technology in developing countries.

Chapter 10 – "New World: Human Energy Unleashed": Reiterates the effects of mobile technology on business and society.

== Reception ==
The Mobile Wave was ranked #5 on The Wall Street Journal bestseller list on July 15, 2012 in the Hardcover Business category. It debuted on The New York Times Best Seller list at position #31 in Hardcover Nonfiction the week of July 23, 2012, and ranked in position #5 in Hardcover Business in August 2012.

In USA Today, reviewer Jeanne Destro writes,

"The MIT-educated Saylor exhibits a deep knowledge of the mobile world, and gives readers a peek free of boring geek-speak. Readers will be able understand and appreciate his clear and engaging exploration of a complex, red-hot, and thoroughly up-to-the minute topic."

The Washingtonian review of the book cited Saylor's vision for the future:

"In The Mobile Wave his vision is clear—we face a future in which paper, devices such as phones, credit cards and cash, entertainment venues, doctor’s office visits, and even the classroom will be obsolete, or nearly so."
