= Sanju Bansal =

Indian-American businessman

Sanju K. Bansal
- Born: Patiala, India
- Education: Massachusetts Institute of Technology (BS); Johns Hopkins University (MS)
- Occupations: Co-Founder, Former Vice Chairman of the Board, and Former Executive Vice President of MicroStrategy; Co-Founder and CEO of Hunch Analytics
- Years active: 1990–Current
- Board member of: Perspecta, EverQuote, Cvent, Clarabridge, Vestmark, Verato, CareJourney, Similarweb

Sanju K. Bansal is an Indian-American businessman, the co-founder of MicroStrategy, a worldwide provider of enterprise software platforms for business intelligence (BI), mobile software, big data and cloud-based services. He served as the company's vice chairman of the board of directors and executive vice president till November 14, 2013. From 1993-2012, he served as chief operating officer of MicroStrategy. Bansal serves or has served as a member of the board of directors of CSRA, a technology services provider to the US government, Cvent, a cloud-based event management software provider, and The Advisory Board Company, a technology research services company.

== Early life and education ==
Bansal was born in Patiala, India and emigrated with his parents to the United States when he was two years old. The family settled in the northern Virginia suburbs of Washington, DC. He attended Lake Braddock Secondary School in Burke, Virginia where he was a valedictorian.

His father, Ved Bansal, came to the United States in 1959 with $1000. His father's work ethic and emphasis on math and science in childhood has been cited as the foundation for his later education and career.

Bansal received a Bachelor of Science in electrical engineering from MIT and a Master of Science in computer science from The Johns Hopkins University.

== Career ==
Directly out of college, Sanju Bansal worked for the technology and management consulting firm, Booz Allen Hamilton.

In 1989, with MIT classmates Michael J. Saylor and Thomas Spahr, Bansal co-founded MicroStrategy. Bansal helped build MicroStrategy with no venture capital, often working 80 to 100 hours per week to get the company off the ground. During this time, the company experienced rapid growth, increasing revenues by 100% every year between 1990 and 1996. In June 1998, MicroStrategy had its initial public offering and, on its first day of trading, the stock price doubled. By March 2000, the company had a market cap of approximately $24 billion, making Bansal and other company leaders billionaires on paper.

Later that month, MicroStrategy announced that it would restate its financial results for the preceding two years, which resulted in an investigation by the U.S. Securities and Exchange Commission. In December 2000, Saylor, Bansal, and the company's former CFO settled with the SEC without admitting wrongdoing by each paying $350,000 in fines. The officers also paid a combined total of $10 million in disgorgement.

Subsequently, the company's stock price plummeted, from a high of $333.00 in March to a low of $9.25 by December 2000. As chief operating officer, Bansal played a significant role in getting MicroStrategy back on its feet. He was instrumental in raising more than $175 million in the following 17 months to keep the company going and expanding business into China in 2002. The company employed more than 3,200 people worldwide and reported revenue of $594.61 million in 2012. As of 2013, the company has operations in 26 countries.

In 2013, Bansal co-founded Hunch Analytics with Aneesh Chopra, which currently contains one portfolio company: CareJourney, a healthcare data analytics firm.

== Board memberships ==
Bansal serves as a board member for the following companies:

- SimilarWeb (NYSE:SMWB), as a member of the board of directors since 2021. SimilarWeb is an Israeli based software & data company specializing in web analytics, web traffic and performance.
- EverQuote (NASDAQ: EVER), as a member of the board of directors since May 2014. EverQuote is an internet marketing firm focused on applying mathematics and technology to auto insurance carriers’ customer acquisition programs. Everquote completed its IPO in June 2018.
- Vestmark, as a member of the board since January 2016. Vestmark offers a technology platform to enable broker-dealers, investment managers, RIAs, bank trusts, and other financial firms to deliver wealth management and advisory solutions.
- Verato, as a member of the board of directors since January 2016. Verato is a SaaS-based platform that cleans, updates, and links customer records within and across systems.
- CareJourney, as co-founder and executive chairman. CareJourney supports payer, provider, and life sciences organizations across the US by wringing insights out of claims data. CareJourney advises on network design and management, patient risk segmentation, spend and utilization trends, and provider, practice, and facility (acute and post-acute) performance.
- AIS, as a member of the board of directors since September 2020. AIS is a technology firm that helps organizations migrate to the Microsoft Azure cloud and modernize their applications.

Previous Boards

- MicroStrategy, as vice-chairman of the board of directors. Bansal served on the MicroStrategy board from September 1997 to November 2013.
- CSRA (NYSE:CSRA), as a member of the board of directors from 2016-2018. On February 12, 2018, General Dynamics announced it was buying CSRA for $9.6 billion.
- The Advisory Board Company (NASDAQ:ABCO), as a member of the board of directors from November 2009 to 2018. In 2018, The Advisory Board Co. was acquired by UnitedHealth Group and Vista (a private equity firm) in a $2.6 billion deal that split the consulting group's healthcare business from its education arm.
- Cvent (Formerly NYSE:CVENT), as non-operating co-creator and member of the Cvent Board of Directors since 1999. Providing the seed capital for the event-management software company, Bansal is credited with helping Cvent navigate the burst of the dot-com bubble and, more recently, pushing the firm to expand into mobile and social applications. On August 9, 2013, Cvent had its initial public offering with a price of $21, and Bansal owned approximately 3.3 million shares, or 7% of the company. On April 18, 2016, Cvent announced that the company was acquired by Vista Equity Partners for $1.65 billion.
- Clarabridge, as a member of the board of directors since March 2010. Clarabridge utilizes speech-to-text and text analytics technologies to report on customer experience data. In October 2021, Qualtrics (NASDAQ: XM), the leader and creator of the Experience Management (XM) category, announced that it acquired Clarabridge for $1.1 billion.
- Perspecta (NYSE: PRSP), as a member of the board of directors since June 2019. Perspecta, a Fortune 1000 company with over $4B in revenue and 14,000 employees, serves the U.S. government by modernizing computer systems, protecting networks and assets, and improving government effectiveness and efficiency. In January 2021, Veritas Capital acquired Perspecta in all-cash transaction valued at $7.1 billion.

== Philanthropy ==
In 1999, Bansal established the Sanju K. Bansal Foundation. The foundation tagline is "helping people help themselves through improved access to information." The foundation is known for its financial sponsorship of WAMU 88.5, American University Radio. WAMU 88.5 is the leading public radio station for NPR news and information in the greater Washington, D.C. area. In 2020, Bansal became a trustee of the NPR Foundation.

In 2020, he was also appointed chairman of the advisory board of Virginia Tech’s Innovation Campus. The Innovation Campus will be the school's $1 billion computer science-focused graduate campus, located in Alexandria, Virginia.

In 2016, Bansal joined the XPrize Foundation Innovation Board. Since 1994, the XPRIZE Foundation has designed and operated 17 competitions in the domain areas of Space, Oceans, Learning, Health, Energy, Environment, Transportation, Safety and Robotics.

In May 2010, the Kailash Goyal Foundation, with aid from the Bansal Foundation, opened the JK Shanti Charitable Clinic, a free clinic to support the medical needs of the villagers and laborers near the Indian town of Panchkula. The clinic treats approximately 20,000 people a year.

Bansal served on the Board of Directors for Wolf Trap Foundation for the Performing Arts from 2000 to 2006. Located near Vienna, Virginia, Wolf Trap is the only National Park dedicated to the performing arts. The Bansal Foundation contributes to organizations including XPrize, the Washington Humane Society, the Network for Teaching Entrepreneurship (NFTE), Upakar Indian-American Scholarship Foundation, the Kailash Goyal Foundation, The Global India Fund, and Wolf Trap National Park for the Performing Arts.

== Recognition and awards ==
In 2013, Bansal received the Washington Business Journal's Outstanding Directors award for his work with Cvent.

In 2009, 2011, and 2013, Bansal was named one of The Washingtonian's 100 Top Tech Titans, a list honoring the top 100 leaders of Washington DC's tech world.

In 2009, he was named one of The Washingtonian's "Style Setters".
