= Deninger =

Deninger is a surname. Notable people with the surname include:

- Christopher Deninger (born 1958), German mathematician
- Paul Deninger (born 1958), American technology industry entrepreneur, board member, investment banker, and venture capitalist

== See also ==
- Deininger, another surname
