= North Carolina v. Covington =

North Carolina v. Covington may refer to either of two United States Supreme Court cases:

- North Carolina v. Covington (2017)
- North Carolina v. Covington (2018), a per curiam decision about remedies for discriminatory election redistricting.
