= Liu v. Securities and Exchange Commission =

- Supreme Court of the United States

Argued March 3, 2020 Decided June 22, 2020
- Full case name: Charles C. Liu, et al., v. Securities and Exchange Commission
- Docket no.: 18-1501
- Citations: 591 U.S. 71 (more) 140 S. Ct. 1936

Case history
- Prior: No. 16-00974-CJC(AGRx), 262 F.3d 957 (C.D. Ca 2017); affirmed, 754 Federal Appendix 505 (9th Cir 2018); cert. granted, 140 S. Ct. 451 (2019).

Holding
- A disgorgement award that does not exceed a wrongdoer's net profits and is awarded for victims is equitable relief permissible under 15 U.S.C. § 78u(d)(5).

Court membership
- Chief Justice John Roberts Associate Justices Clarence Thomas · Ruth Bader Ginsburg; Stephen Breyer · Samuel Alito; Sonia Sotomayor · Elena Kagan; Neil Gorsuch · Brett Kavanaugh

Case opinions
- Majority: Sotomayor, joined by Roberts, Ginsburg, Breyer, Alito, Kagan, Gorsuch, Kavanaugh
- Dissent: Thomas

Laws applied
- Securities Act of 1933

Liu v. Securities and Exchange Commission, 591 U.S. 71 (2020), is a US Supreme Court case related to disgorgement awards sought by the Securities and Exchange Commission (SEC) for fraudulent activities. The Court ruled in an 8–1 decision that such disgorgement awards can be awarded by the courts as equitable relief under the Securities Act of 1933, 15 U.S.C. § 78u(d)(5), but they are limited to the wrongdoer's net profits and must be awarded for victims.

== Background ==
Around 2014, Charles C. Liu and Xin Wang, a married couple and U.S. citizens in California, sought out investments from several Chinese companies while claiming that they were going to use the money to build a cancer treatment center, through which they would later establish a means for investors to obtain an EB-5 visa. The EB-5 program allowed for such visas to be obtained if more than $500,000 was invested in certain types of development projects. By 2016, they had obtained investments from at least 50 different Chinese citizens, totaling more than $27 million. However, as determined by the Securities and Exchange Commission (SEC), the couple did not use the funds towards the project. While they had secured the land, there had been no development work on it during the 18 months after they had gotten the investments, and the SEC found that $11.8 million of the funds had been transferred back to Chinese companies owned by Liu and that another large portion had been used for personal expenses by the couple. The SEC had begun its investigation in February 2016 and filed official charges against the couple in June 2016 under the Securities Act of 1933, which that prohibits fraud, specifically misstatements as to use of investment funds under 15 U.S.C. § 77l. The SEC filed its case in the United States District Court for the Central District of California.

The District Court ruled against the couple in April 2017. In addition to permanently enjoining the couple from ever engaging in the EB-5 program, the court issued a disgorgement award, requiring the couple to pay back the full amount that it had obtained from the investors and a civil penalty of $8.2 million.

Liu and Wang appealed to the United States Court of Appeals for the Ninth Circuit and asserted they had not defrauded the investors since they were not seeking profits or securities but visas. Among their arguments, the appeal addressed the recent Supreme Court's decision in Kokesh v. SEC (581 U.S. ___ (2017)). Kokesh had determined that disgorgement awards were to be treated as penalties (in that case, they were subject to a statute of limitations) but left open the question "on whether courts possess authority to order disgorgement in SEC enforcement proceedings or on whether courts have properly applied disgorgement principles in this context."

The Ninth Circuit upheld the District Court's ruling in October 2018 and asserted that Kokesh had not yet prevented the courts from issuing disgorgement award and that in this case, the disgorgement award should not discount the legitimate business expenses, such as rent, which the couple had paid for during the 18 months.

== Supreme Court ==
Liu and Wang petitioned to the Supreme Court on the question on whether the SEC can seek a disgorgement award as a form of equitable relief despite the Kokesh ruling that disgorgement award was determined to be a penalty. The Supreme Court accepted the petition in November 2019, which legal analysts believed was to resolve the open-ended question left by Kokesh. Oral arguments were heard on March 3, 2020, in which Liu and Wang's legal counsel continue to argued that Congress never gave the SEC authority to impose disgorgement as penalties, and observers saw the justices forced more on questions to reigning in the size of such disgorgement awards.

The Court issued its decision on June 22, 2020. In an 8–1 decision, the Court ruled that courts can award for disgorgement in security fraud cases and affirmed the implied stance from Kokesh but limited them to the net profits of the conduct from the fraudulent activity. Also, the decision required those funds to be paid back to the defrauded investors. Justice Sonia Sotomayor wrote for the majority, which was joined by all but Justice Clarence Thomas. Sotomayor affirmed in her decision that "Congress prohibited the SEC from seeking an equitable remedy in excess of a defendant’s net profits from wrongdoing," under 15 U.S.C. § 78u(d)(5). She further wrote "To avoid transforming an equitable remedy into a punitive sanction, courts restricted the remedy to an individual wrongdoer's net profits to be awarded for victims."

Justice Thomas, in his dissent, stated that under 78u(d)(5), disgorgement is not "equitable relief" and so he disagreed with the conclusion of the majority. Thomas also wrote of concerns on the disgorgement being returned to investors: "The money ordered to be paid as disgorgement in no sense belongs to the government, and the majority cites no authority allowing a government agency to keep equitable relief for a wrong done to a third party."

The judgement vacated the Ninth Circuit's judgement and remanded the case to that court to re-evaluate the amount of the award based on this decision, including the deduction of legitimate business expenses.
