= Angel Incorporated =

American telecommunications company

Angel.com Incorporated
- Company type: Subsidiary of Genesys Telecommunications Laboratories
- Industry: Telecom
- Founded: 1999
- Defunct: 2013
- Successor: Genesys
- Headquarters: Daly City, CA
- Key people: Paul Segre (President & CEO)
- Number of employees: 130
- Website: www.genesys.com/angel

Angel, was an American telecommunications company supplying interactive voice response, call center technology, and voice applications to businesses over the internet using the software as a service model from 1999 to 2013. It was acquired in 2013 by Genesys and rebranded as Genesys Premier Edition.

In April 2021, Angel Studios, a media company, purchased the domain angel.com from Genesys for $2 million to build a video streaming service.

== History ==
Angel was developed in 1997 by Michael J. Saylor, the CEO of MicroStrategy, as DSS Telecaster and DSS Broadcaster, which were then merged into Angel.com. Originally it was planned as a telecaster but became a provider of hosted interactive voice response; the firm signed its first small business customers at the end of 2001.

Angel.com was incorporated on April 30, 2008. In 2009, Dave Rennyson, former VP of Sales at Angel, was named president and COO replacing long-time CEO Michael Zirngibl. In 2011, the firm introduced Voice for Twitter Voice for Facebook, and Voice for Chatter (Salesforce.com's internal social network).

In August 2012, the firm introduced Lexee, an extension of its SaaS telephony platform that enabled publication of voice simultaneously on both Telephony platforms and mobile devices.

Angel.com shed the ".com" from its publicly branded name in August 2010.

Angel was acquired in 2013 by Genesys and rebranded as Genesys Premier Edition with a new corporate site.

=== Acquisition ===
In March 2013, Genesys, a California-based customer experience and call center technology company, acquired Angel as a subsidiary. Genesys integrated Angel's cloud-based self-service contact center and re-branded the service as Genesys Cloud. In June 2014, Angel.com was migrated to Genesys.com/Angel.

=== Domain sold ===
On April 15, 2021, Angel Studios, a video streaming service and media company that finances media productions through equity crowdfunding, purchased the domain angel.com from Genesys for $2 million.
