= Clarabridge =

American software company

- Company type: Private
- Industry: Software
- Founded: 2005
- Headquarters: Reston, Virginia, United States
- Key people: Sid Banerjee, Co-Founder, Chief Strategy Officer; Justin Langseth, Co-Founder, CTO (2005-2012); Mark Bishof, CEO (2016-present); Yuchun Lee, Chairman of the Board; Sanju Bansal, Board Member
- Products: Customer feedback management services, Customer experience management, Text analytics, Sentiment Analysis, Speech analytics, Digital customer service
- Website: www.clarabridge.com

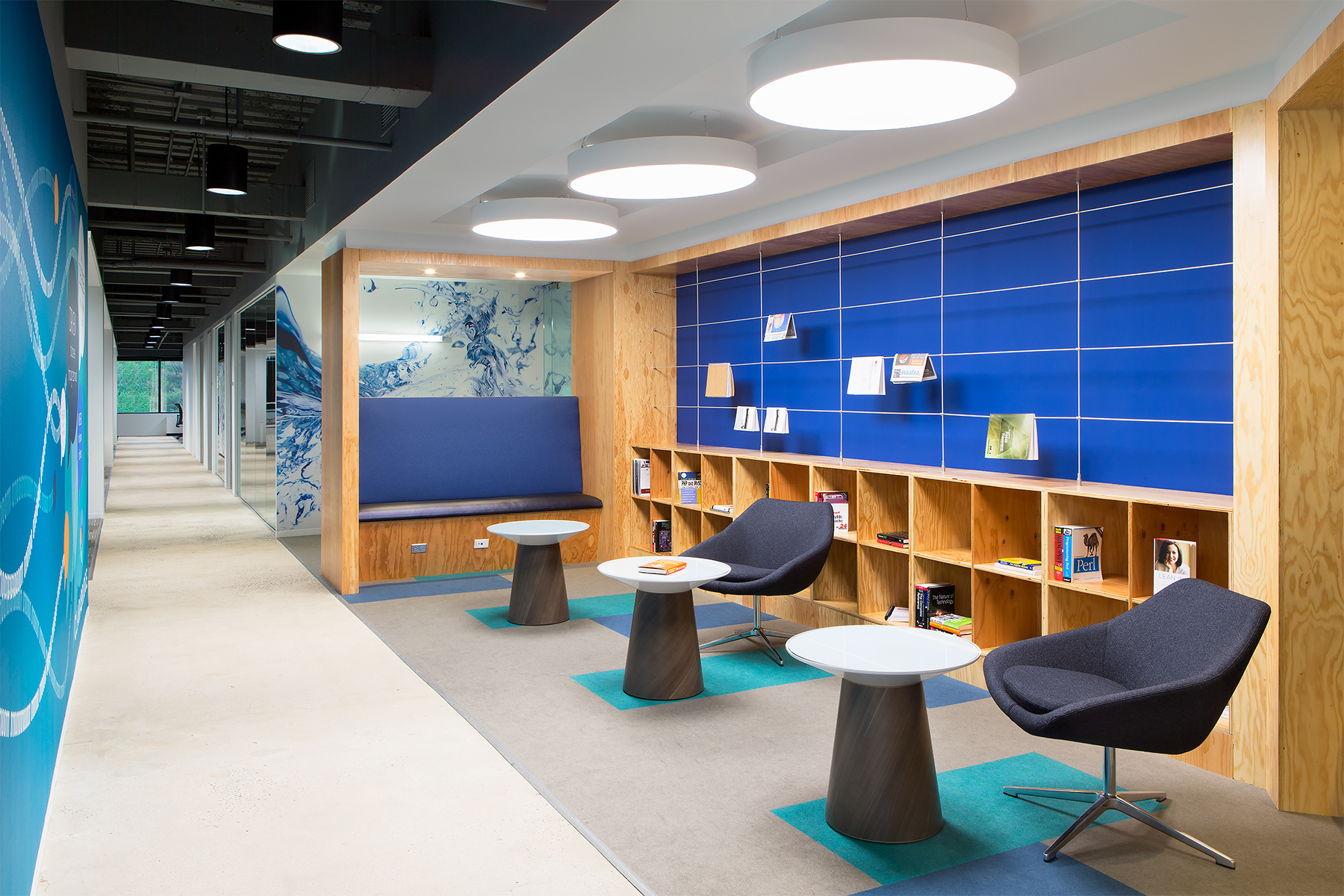
The Clarabridge HQ office environment featuring a library nook

Clarabridge was an American software company. It was founded in 2005 in Reston, Virginia. Clarabridge offers customer experience software as a service (SaaS) using AI-powered text and speech analytics. The data typically used for analysis comes from social media (such as Facebook, Twitter, or review sites), call center notes, email, chats, and surveys. Using natural language processing and other patented technology, the software is used in voice of the customer, customer experience management and customer feedback programs. Clarabridge was acquired by Qualtrics in October 2021.

== Company milestones ==
- October, 2005: Clarabridge is incorporated
- November, 2008: First Clarabridge Customer Connections User Conference (C3)
- March, 2011: EMEA (Europe, Middle East, and Africa) Office Opens in London
- December, 2011: One Billion Verbatim Processed
- August, 2012: Two Billion Verbatim Processed
- September, 2012: Clarabridge Culture/Social Inclusion Club Founded
- February, 2013: Clarabridge opens office in San Francisco
- September, 2013: $80M in Series D Funding
- April, 2014: Acquisition of Market Metrix
- April, 2015: Acquisition of Engagor
- March, 2018: Clara-Ladies Founded
- July, 2018: Clarabridge Announces Support for WhatsApp Business
- July, 2020: Clarabridge Introduces Intelligent Scoring (patent pending)
- October, 2020: Clarabridge Launches Integration with Microsoft Dynamics 365 Customer Voice and Dynamics 365
- October, 2020: Clarabridge Launches Partnership with Facebook
- October, 2021: Qualtrics completes acquisition of Clarabridge
