= Deininger =

Deininger is a surname. Notable people with the surname include:

- Beate Deininger (born 1964), German field hockey player
- David G. Deininger (born 1947), American politician and jurist
- Leonhard Deininger (1910–2002), German politician
- Pep Deininger (1877–1950), German baseball player
- Wunibald Deininger (1879–1963), Austrian architect and art teacher

== See also ==
- Deninger, another surname
