= Los Angeles County v. Mendez =

- Supreme Court of the United States

Decided May 30, 2017
- Full case name: Los Angeles County v. Mendez
- Docket no.: 16-369
- Citations: 581 U.S. 420 (more)

Holding
- Under the Fourth Amendment, there is no "provocation rule" that makes an officer's reasonable use of force unreasonable if the officer provoked the violent confrontation by violating the Fourth Amendment.

Court membership
- Chief Justice John Roberts Associate Justices Anthony Kennedy · Clarence Thomas; Ruth Bader Ginsburg · Stephen Breyer; Samuel Alito · Sonia Sotomayor; Elena Kagan · Neil Gorsuch

Case opinion
- Majority: Alito, joined by unanimous
- Gorsuch took no part in the consideration or decision of the case.

Laws applied
- Const. amend. IV

Los Angeles County v. Mendez, 581 U.S. 420 (2017), was a United States Supreme Court case in which the court held that under the Fourth Amendment, there is no "provocation rule" that makes an officer's reasonable use of force unreasonable if the officer provoked the violent confrontation by violating the Fourth Amendment.

== Background ==
The Los Angeles County Sheriff's Department received word from a confidential informant that a potentially armed-and-dangerous parolee-at-large had been seen at a certain residence. While other officers searched the main house, Deputies Conley and Pederson searched the back of the property where, unbeknownst to the deputies, respondents Angel Mendez and Jennifer Garcia (later also Mendez) were napping inside a shack where they lived. Without a search warrant and without announcing their presence, the deputies opened the door of the shack. Mendez rose from the bed, holding a BB gun that he used to kill pests. Deputy Conley yelled, "Gun!" and the deputies immediately opened fire, shooting Mendez and Garcia multiple times. Officers did not find the parolee in the shack or elsewhere on the property.

Mendez and Garcia sued Deputies Conley and Pederson and the County under Section 1983, pressing three Fourth Amendment claims: a warrantless entry claim, a knock-and-announce claim, and an excessive force claim. On the first two claims, the federal district court awarded Mendez and Garcia nominal damages. On the excessive-force claim, the court found that the deputies' use of force was reasonable under Graham v. Connor, but held them liable nonetheless under the Ninth Circuit Court of Appeals's provocation rule, which made an officer's otherwise reasonable use of force unreasonable if (1) the officer "intentionally or recklessly provokes a violent confrontation" and (2) "the provocation is an independent Fourth Amendment violation." On appeal, the Ninth Circuit held that the officers were entitled to qualified immunity on the knock-and-announce claim and that the warrantless entry violated clearly established law. It also affirmed the district court's application of the provocation rule, and held, in the alternative, that basic notions of proximate cause would support liability even without the provocation rule.

== Opinion of the court ==
The Supreme Court issued an opinion on May 30, 2017.

The Supreme Court held unanimously that excessive force claims should be assessed based on the totality of circumstances, as articulated in Graham v. Connor. They held that this was the only means to assess these claims, and that the alternative means created by the provocation rule had no basis. The court held that using one Fourth Amendment claim to prove another was an unnecessary expansion of Graham.

== Subsequent developments ==
The Ninth Circuit held on remand that the officers were still liable for the excessive force, as their own unreasonable conduct in failing to knock and announce themselves resulted in the shooting. The court concluded that while it is reasonable to use force against a person who appears to be moving a weapon, the totality of the circumstances requires considering that the prior, unreasonable behavior of the no-knock entry prevented Mendez from waking up and responding properly to the officers.
