= List of United States Supreme Court cases, volume 581 =

This is a list of all the United States Supreme Court cases from volume 581 of the United States Reports:

Case name	Docket no.	Date decided
Moore v. Texas	581 U.S. 1	March 28, 2017
When deciding if an inmate on death row is qualified as "intellectually disabled", as under Atkins v. Virginia (2002), courts may not ignore dominant medical guidelines. Texas Court of Criminal Appeals reversed and remanded.
Expressions Hair Design v. Schneiderman	581 U.S. 37	March 29, 2017
Price controls, when used to prevent certain communication of the price of a good with regard to a surcharge, implicate freedom of speech as protected under the First Amendment. United States Court of Appeals for the Second Circuit reversed and remanded.
Dean v. United States	581 U.S. 62	April 3, 2017
Section 924(c), which provides mandatory minimum sentences for the use of a firearm during certain crimes, does not prevent a sentencing court from considering a mandatory minimum imposed under that provision when calculating an appropriate sentence for the predicate offense.
McLane Co. v. EEOC	581 U.S. 72	April 3, 2017
A district court's decision whether to enforce or quash a subpoena issued by the Equal Employment Opportunity Commission should be reviewed for abuse of discretion, not de novo.
Coventry Health Care v. Nevils	581 U.S. 87	April 18, 2017
Federal laws governing federal employees' health insurance preempt state laws affecting contractual subrogation and reimbursement prescriptions.
Goodyear Tire & Rubber Co. v. Haeger	581 U.S. 101	April 18, 2017
When a court sanctions bad-faith conduct by ordering a litigant to pay the other side’s legal fees, the award is limited to the fees the innocent party incurred solely because of the bad-faith misconduct.
Manrique v. United States	581 U.S. 116	April 19, 2017
A defendant wishing to appeal an order imposing restitution in a deferred restitution case must file a notice of appeal from that order.
Nelson v. Colorado	581 U.S. 128	April 19, 2017
The Colorado Exoneration Act's scheme does not comport with the Fourteenth Amendment's guarantee of due process
Lewis v. Clarke	581 U.S. 155	April 25, 2017
Tribal sovereign immunity does not extend to suits against a tribal employee acting in his individual capacity. Supreme Court of Connecticut reversed and remanded.
Republic of Venezuela v. Helmerich & Payne Int'l Drilling Co.	581 U.S. 170	May 1, 2017
A court should decide a foreign sovereign's immunity defense at the threshold of the action. The nonfrivolous-argument standard cannot be used to decide if a case falls within the scope of the expropriation exception to foreign sovereign immunity.
Bank of Am. Corp. v. Miami	581 U.S. 189	May 1, 2017
A city can be an "aggrieved person" authorized to bring suit under the FHA, and conduct challenged under the FHA must be shown to be a proximate cause of the harm attributed to it.
Howell v. Howell	581 U.S. 214	May 15, 2017
A state court may not order a veteran to indemnify a divorced spouse for the loss in the divorced spouse's portion of the veteran's retirement pay caused by the veteran's waiver of retirement pay to receive service-related disability benefits.
Midland Funding, LLC v. Johnson	581 U.S. 224	May 15, 2017
The filing of a bankruptcy proof of claim that is obviously time-barred is not a false, deceptive, misleading, unfair, or unconscionable debt-collection practice within the meaning of the Fair Debt Collection Practices Act.
Kindred Nursing Centers, L.P. v. Clark	581 U.S. 246	May 15, 2017
The FAA preempts any state rule that discriminates on its face against arbitration or that covertly accomplishes the same objective by disfavoring contracts that have the defining features of arbitration agreements.
TC Heartland LLC v. Kraft Foods Group Brands LLC	581 U.S. 258	May 22, 2017
For patent infringement cases, a corporate defendant is considered to "reside" in their state of incorporation.
Water Splash, Inc. v. Menon	581 U.S. 271	May 22, 2017
The Hague Service Convention permits service of judicial process abroad by mail, provided that the country in which the service takes place has not objected to service by mail, and service by mail is authorized in the country where the litigation is pending.
Cooper v. Harris	581 U.S. 285	May 22, 2017
North Carolina relied too heavily on race in redrawing two Congressional districts after the 2010 Census (M.D.N.C. affirmed)
Impression Products, Inc. v. Lexmark Int'l, Inc.	581 U.S. 360	May 30, 2017
Patent holders give up their patent rights upon the first sale of product, domestically or overseas.
Esquivel-Quintana v. Sessions	581 U.S. 385	May 30, 2017
In the context of statutory rape offenses that criminalize sexual intercourse based solely on the ages of the participants, the generic federal definition of "sexual abuse of a minor" requires the age of the victim to be less than 16. Reversed and remanded.
BNSF Railway Co. v. Tyrrell	581 U.S. 402	May 30, 2017
A state court does not have personal jurisdiction over a railroad that is neither incorporated in nor headquartered in the state, on a claim that does not arise from an occurrence within the state, even though the railroad has extensive trackage and many employees in the state
Los Angeles Cnty. v. Mendez	581 U.S. 420	May 30, 2017
Under the Fourth Amendment, there is no "provocation rule" that makes an officer's reasonable use of force unreasonable if the officer provoked the violent confrontation by violating the Fourth Amendment.
Town of Chester v. Laroe Estates, Inc.	581 U.S. 433	June 5, 2017
A litigant seeking to intervene as of right under Federal Rule of Civil Procedure 24(a)(2) must meet the requirements of Article III standing if the intervenor wishes to pursue relief not requested by a plaintiff.
Honeycutt v. United States	581 U.S. 443	June 5, 2017
There is no joint and several liability for forfeitures in federal conspiracy judgments when a party did not personally benefit from the crime.
Kokesh v. SEC	581 U.S. 455	June 5, 2017
Because SEC disgorgement is a punitive measure rather than a compensatory one, any claim for disgorgement in an SEC enforcement action must be commenced within five years of the date the claim accrued.
Advocate Health Care Network v. Stapleton	581 U.S. 468	June 5, 2017
A plan maintained by a principal-purpose organization qualifies as a "church plan," regardless of who established it.
North Carolina v. Covington	581 U.S. 486	June 5, 2017
Affirmed, in part, the district court's remedy in a case alleging racial gerrymandering.
