= Republic of Venezuela v. Helmerich & Payne International Drilling Co. =

- Supreme Court of the United States

Decided May 1, 2017
- Full case name: Republic of Venezuela v. Helmerich & Payne International Drilling Co.
- Docket no.: 15-423
- Citations: 581 U.S. 170 (more)

Holding
- A court should decide a foreign sovereign's immunity defense at the threshold of the action. The nonfrivolous-argument standard cannot be used to decide if a case falls within the scope of the expropriation exception to foreign sovereign immunity.

Court membership
- Chief Justice John Roberts Associate Justices Anthony Kennedy · Clarence Thomas; Ruth Bader Ginsburg · Stephen Breyer; Samuel Alito · Sonia Sotomayor; Elena Kagan · Neil Gorsuch

Case opinion
- Majority: Breyer, joined by unanimous
- Gorsuch took no part in the consideration or decision of the case.

Laws applied
- Foreign Sovereign Immunities Act

Republic of Venezuela v. Helmerich & Payne International Drilling Co., 581 U.S. 170 (2017), was a United States Supreme Court case in which the court held that a court should decide a foreign sovereign's immunity defense at the threshold of the action. The nonfrivolous-argument standard cannot be used to decide if a case falls within the scope of the expropriation exception to foreign sovereign immunity.

== Background ==
The Foreign Sovereign Immunities Act (FSIA) shields foreign states from suits in United States courts with specified exceptions. The expropriation exception applies to "any case... in which rights in property taken in violation of international law are in issue and that property... is owned or operated by an agency or instrumentality of the foreign state... engaged in a commercial activity in the United States."

A wholly owned Venezuelan subsidiary (Subsidiary) of an American company (Parent) had long supplied oil rigs to oil development entities that were part of the Venezuelan government. The American Parent and its Venezuelan Subsidiary (plaintiffs) filed suit in a federal district court against those entities (Venezuela), claiming that Venezuela had unlawfully expropriated the Subsidiary's rigs by nationalizing them. Venezuela moved to dismiss the case on the ground that its sovereign immunity deprived the district court of jurisdiction. Plaintiffs argued that the case falls within the expropriation exception, but Venezuela claimed that international law did not cover the expropriation of property belonging to a country's nationals like the Subsidiary and that the American Parent did not have property rights in the Subsidiary's assets. The district court agreed as to the Subsidiary, dismissing its claim on jurisdictional grounds. However, it rejected the claim that the Parent had no rights in the Subsidiary's property. The District of Columbia Circuit reversed in part and affirmed in part, finding that both claims fell within the exception. With respect to the Subsidiary's claim, it concluded that a sovereign's taking of its own nationals' property would violate international law if the expropriation unreasonably discriminated based on a company's shareholders' nationality. With respect to the Parent's claim, it held that the exception applied because the Parent had raised its rights in a nonfrivolous way. The court decided only whether the plaintiffs might have a nonfrivolous expropriation claim, making clear that, under its standard, a nonfrivolous argument would be sufficient to bring a case within the scope of the exception. Given the factual stipulations, the court concluded, the Subsidiary had satisfied that standard for purposes of surviving a motion to dismiss.

== Opinion of the court ==
The Supreme Court issued an opinion on May 1, 2017.
