= Kindred Nursing Centers, L.P. v. Clark =

- Supreme Court of the United States

Decided May 15, 2017
- Full case name: Kindred Nursing Centers, L.P. v. Clark
- Docket no.: 16-32
- Citations: 581 U.S. 246 (more)

Holding
- The FAA preempts any state rule that discriminates on its face against arbitration or that covertly accomplishes the same objective by disfavoring contracts that have the defining features of arbitration agreements.

Court membership
- Chief Justice John Roberts Associate Justices Anthony Kennedy · Clarence Thomas; Ruth Bader Ginsburg · Stephen Breyer; Samuel Alito · Sonia Sotomayor; Elena Kagan · Neil Gorsuch

Case opinions
- Majority: Kagan
- Dissent: Thomas
- Gorsuch took no part in the consideration or decision of the case.

Laws applied
- Federal Arbitration Act

Kindred Nursing Centers, L.P. v. Clark, 581 U.S. 246 (2017), was a United States Supreme Court case in which the court held that the FAA preempts any state rule that discriminates on its face against arbitration or that covertly accomplishes the same objective by disfavoring contracts that have the defining features of arbitration agreements.

== Background ==
Beverly Wellner and Janis Clark—the wife and daughter, respectively, of Joe Wellner and Olive Clark—each held a power of attorney affording her broad authority to manage her family member's affairs. When Joe and Olive moved into a nursing home operated by petitioner Kindred Nursing Centers L.P., Beverly and Janis used their powers of attorney to complete all necessary paperwork. As part of that process, each signed an arbitration agreement on her relative's behalf providing that any claims arising from the relative's stay at the facility would be resolved through binding arbitration. After Joe and Olive died, their estates (represented by Beverly and Janis) filed suits alleging that Kindred's substandard care had caused their deaths. Kindred moved to dismiss the cases, arguing that the arbitration agreements prohibited bringing the disputes to court. The trial court denied Kindred's motions, and the Kentucky Court of Appeals agreed that the suits could go forward.

The Kentucky Supreme Court consolidated the cases and affirmed. The court initially found that the language of the Wellner power of attorney did not permit Beverly to enter into an arbitration agreement on Joe's behalf, but that the Clark document gave Janis the capacity to do so on behalf of Olive. Nonetheless, the court held, both arbitration agreements were invalid because neither power of attorney specifically entitled the representative to enter into an arbitration agreement. Because the Kentucky Constitution declares the rights of access to the courts and trial by jury to be "sacred" and "inviolate," the court determined, an agent could deprive her principal of such rights only if expressly provided in the power of attorney.

== Opinion of the court ==
The Supreme Court issued an opinion on May 15, 2017.
