= Coventry Health Care v. Nevils =

- Supreme Court of the United States

Decided April 18, 2017
- Full case name: Coventry Health Care v. Nevils
- Docket no.: 16-149
- Citations: 581 U.S. 87 (more)

Holding
- Federal laws governing federal employees' health insurance preempt state laws affecting contractual subrogation and reimbursement prescriptions.

Court membership
- Chief Justice John Roberts Associate Justices Anthony Kennedy · Clarence Thomas; Ruth Bader Ginsburg · Stephen Breyer; Samuel Alito · Sonia Sotomayor; Elena Kagan · Neil Gorsuch

Case opinion
- Majority: Ginsburg, joined by unanimous
- Gorsuch took no part in the consideration or decision of the case.

Laws applied
- Supremacy Clause

Coventry Health Care v. Nevils, 581 U.S. 87 (2017), was a United States Supreme Court case in which the court held that federal laws governing federal employees' health insurance preempt state laws affecting contractual subrogation and reimbursement prescriptions.

== Background ==
The Federal Employees Health Benefits Act of 1959 (FEHBA) authorizes the Office of Personnel Management (OPM) to contract with private carriers for federal employees' health insurance. FEHBA contains an express-preemption provision, which states that the "terms of any contract under this chapter which relate to the nature, provision, or extent of coverage or benefits (including payments with respect to benefits) shall supersede and preempt any State or local law... which relates to health insurance or plans."

OPM's contracts have long required private carriers to seek subrogation and reimbursement. Accordingly, OPM's regulations make a carrier's "right to pursue and receive subrogation and reimbursement recoveries... a condition of and a limitation on the nature of benefits or benefit payments and on the provision of benefits under the plan's coverage." In 2015, OPM published a new rule confirming that a carrier's subrogation and reimbursement rights and responsibilities "relate to the nature, provision, and extent of coverage or benefits (including payments with respect to benefits) within the meaning of" FEHBA, and "are . . . effective notwithstanding any state or local law, or any regulation issued thereunder, which relates to health insurance or plans."

Jodie Nevils was insured under a FEHBA plan offered by Coventry Health Care of Missouri. When Nevils was injured in a car crash, Coventry paid his medical expenses. Coventry subsequently asserted a lien against part of the settlement Nevils recovered from the driver who caused his injuries. Nevils satisfied the lien, then filed a class action in Missouri state court, alleging that, under Missouri law, which does not permit subrogation or reimbursement in this context, Coventry had unlawfully obtained reimbursement. Coventry countered that FEHBA preempted the state law. The trial court granted summary judgment in Coventry's favor, and the Missouri Court of Appeals affirmed. The Missouri Supreme Court reversed. Finding the relevant portion of FEHBA susceptible to diverse plausible readings, the court invoked a "presumption against preemption" to conclude that the federal statute's preemptive scope excluded subrogation and reimbursement. On remand from the Supreme Court for further consideration in light of OPM's 2015 rule, the Missouri Supreme Court adhered to that earlier decision. A majority of the Missouri Supreme Court also held that the express-preemption clause in FEHBA violated the Supremacy Clause.
