= Surcharge (payment systems) =

Extra fee charged by a merchant when receiving a non-cash payment

A payment surcharge, also known as checkout fee, is an extra fee charged by a merchant when receiving a payment by cheque, credit card, charge card, debit card or an e-money account, but not cash, which at least covers the cost to the merchant of accepting that means of payment, such as the merchant service fee imposed by a credit card company. Retailers generally incur higher costs when consumers choose to pay by credit card due to higher merchant service fees compared to traditional payment methods such as cash.

A surcharge may be prohibited by card issuers, such as Visa and MasterCard, but the enforcement of the prohibition is not uniform. Some jurisdictions have laws which require, allow, regulate or prohibit a merchant imposing a surcharge. If no surcharge is permitted, the merchant's costs are borne by the merchant, who may incorporate the burden in its prices. In some jurisdictions, when a customer pays with cash, the merchant may offer a discount.

== Economics of surcharging ==
Different payment methods such as cash, credit cards and debit cards have different costs and benefits to both the merchant and the consumer.

Under "uniform pricing" (pricing that does not reflect the payment method chosen by the individual), consumers do not consider the effect of their choice of payment on the seller. Using credit cards, which utilize a payment platform, will incur fees to the seller. Additionally, the seller suffers from indirect costs such as missing interest payments on the balance of goods or services sold using credit.

Thus, the cost of using payment systems like these are borne primarily by the merchant. For customers to internalize this negative externality, merchants can use pricing incentives, through surcharging, to direct their customers to paying in the most cost-effective manner for their business. Utilizing this practice, the merchants can capture more of the consumer surplus using price discrimination methods. These tactics have been stopped in many countries where regulatory requirements ban the practice from occurring. Additionally, many card companies have enforced requirements stopping merchants from surcharging card transactions, to maintain demand from consumers for their services.

In the presence of surcharging, consumers are encouraged to make payments using a cheaper option. They will elect to use traditional methods, such as cash, to avoid the extra cost of acquiring a good or service. Consumers indirectly place competitive pressure on payment platform providers, which could indirectly lower the merchants' payment costs. As consumers' indirectly lower the cost to sellers or selling, the right to apply a surcharge on expensive payment methods means the business can offer lower prices on goods and services to all potential customers. This could generate an increase in demand and an overall increase in consumer welfare. In the absence of surcharging it is postulated that there are substantial negative social and economic welfare effects including inflation, a reduction in the purchasing power of consumers because of larger debt service, lower ravings rates and inequitable cross-subsidization between consumers paying with cards and those paying with cash.

== Regulation of surcharging ==
=== United States ===
In Expressions Hair Design v. Schneiderman, the United States Supreme Court held that New York’s “no-surcharge” law regulates speech, and remanded to the Second Circuit Court of Appeals to determine whether the law can survive First Amendment scrutiny. The New York law prohibits businesses from posting a cash price and adding a fee when customers choose credit (a “credit card surcharge”). However, the law permits businesses to post a credit card price and charge less when customers choose cash, check, or equivalent means (a “cash discount”). Because these two pricing regimes are economically identical and different only as a matter of framing, the Supreme Court determined that the New York law regulates not the prices themselves, but instead the communication of prices.

Similar “no-surcharge” laws existed in 10 other U.S. states. Namely. California, Colorado, Connecticut, Florida, Kansas, Maine, Massachusetts, Oklahoma, Texas, and Utah. The Florida “no-surcharge” law was found unconstitutional in Dana’s Railroad Supply v. Bondi, and the California “no-surcharge” law was found unconstitutional by a federal district court in Italian Colors Restaurant v. Harris. The Texas “no-surcharge” law faces a pending legal challenge. Currently, businesses in 46 states are permitted to surcharge consistent with the rules promulgated by Visa and Mastercard.

=== Australia ===
Since the Reserve Bank of Australia's 2003 requirement that the card brands remove the 'no-surcharge' rules that had previously been in effect, Australia has seen a significant increase in the number of businesses opting to pass on transaction costs, with approximately 42% of Australian businesses assessing transaction fees in 2013. The competition amongst the card brands in the wake of the changes has significantly reduced the interchange fees assessed to merchants. Surcharges must not be more than the amount that it costs a merchant to accept a particular type of card for a given transaction.

In 2017, the Australian Competition and Consumer Commission (ACCC) placed an excessive payment surcharge ban on all merchants in the country. Businesses in Australia were banned from charging customers excessive surcharges on transactions made using EFTPOS, Mastercard, Visa and American Express. The ACCC provided a statement on the matter directed at all businesses:

“Our message to business is that you are not allowed to add on any of your own internal costs when calculating what surcharge you will charge customers. The only costs businesses can include are external costs charged to you by your financial provider".

After consultation in 2026 and due to payment shifts , the Reserve Bank of Australia agreed to allow banning of card surcharges from 1 October 2026.

=== Canada ===
In June 2017, Visa and MasterCard agreed to drop their contractual prohibitions on surcharging in Canada as part of a settlement of a long-standing class action lawsuit. Canadian merchants may begin to apply credit card surcharges 18 months after court approval of the settlement.

=== European Union ===
In March 2015, the European Parliament voted to cap interchange fees to 0.3% for credit cards and to 0.2% for debit cards and subsequently issued, in November 2015, the Payment Services Directive (PSD2) prohibiting businesses from charging extra when consumers use credit cards or debit cards.

=== United Kingdom ===
In the United Kingdom, the Consumer Rights (Payment Surcharges) Regulations 2012, also called the Surcharges Regulations 2012, limit payment surcharges with some exceptions. Payments for the supply of water, gas and electricity are regulated but payments for calls from public telephones are not regulated. The Surcharges Regulations and the Consumer Contracts (Information, Cancellation and Additional Charges) Regulations 2013 are intended to work together.

The Payment Services Regulations 2017 amended the UK law on payment surcharges. Since 2018, no payee (whether a business or not) may charge any payer a surcharge for the use of a non-commercial card, nor may the payee charge a payer using a commercial card a fee which exceeds the cost borne by the payee for that transaction.

=== Switzerland ===
The Federal Competition Commission has recently (2014) allowed payment schemes to ban surcharging in Switzerland through their standard contract terms.

== Reasons for surcharging ==
Countries including the United States, Australia, and Canada have sought to promote price competition among card brands to increase efficiency. In the United States, consumer protection advocates have promoted for surcharging solutions as a mechanism to slow the rapidly increasing cost to businesses of card acceptance, including the 24% increase in interchange cost for Visa and Mastercard rewards cards since 2004. The Boston Federal Reserve argues:

"Merchant fees and reward programs generate an implicit monetary transfer to credit card users from non-card (or “cash”) users because merchants generally do not set differential prices for card users to recoup the costs of fees and rewards. On average, [...] each card-using household receives $1,133 from cash users every year."

Whereas businesses that pay for the cost of card acceptance have no mechanism of exerting price pressure on the card brands, businesses that require their customers to pay the fees associated with their card create price competition, as the customers choosing the form of payment will prefer to use lower-cost cards. By creating the incentive for customers to choose lower-cost cards, surcharging reduces transaction costs overall. For example, industry experts have shown that, on a $1,000 transaction, motivating a customer to choose a debit card (to which no surcharge is applied) instead of a premium rewards credit card reduces the interchange cost of the transaction by up to $23.38.

In the absence of surcharging, a retailer will attempt to recover the cost of using their payment platform a uniform increase in the price of goods and services. They will include a margin on top of their products in order to cover the average cost to the business of using a payment system, such as a credit. This results in a cross-subsidization from consumers using different payment types. Those who pay with low-cost methods such as cash or direct debit pay the same amount as customer using credit cards.

Additionally, in the absence of surcharging, the prices of different payment methods are masked to the consumer, harming consumer welfare. Using credit cards to pay for goods or services can distort consumer's cost-benefit analysis decisions and increase their willingness to pay for goods or services. An MIT study found that students when bidding on sporting tickets were willing to place bids up to 64% higher when using credit compared to cash. This underestimation bias the consumer is prone to because of increased credit card usage results in a reduction in their personal welfare.

== Misuse of surcharging ==
Some merchants impose surcharges to make additional profit instead of to cover official credit card company charges, in violation of consumer protections. A prominent example of this phenomenon occurred in Australia when surcharging was permitted. In December 2010, the average rates of surcharges for MasterCard, Visa and Diners Club credit cards were 1.8, 1.9 and 4%, respectively. The merchant fees for MasterCard and Visa cards were around 0.6% and the fees for Diners Club cards were around 2.2%.

Additionally, many merchants seeking to reduce transaction costs have implemented non-compliant solutions that fail to meet price transparency and consumer friendliness standards imposed by the card brands' contract requirements.

== Existing literature on surcharging ==
Wright investigated the welfare effect of removing a no-surcharge mandate in a model where a not-for-profit credit card provider gave payment facilities to consumers and a homogeneous monopoly merchant. When the rule is removed, welfare was decreased for society as the monopoly merchants placed fees on the use of credit cards which were higher than the merchant fees they were required to pay.

Conversely, Schwartz and Vincent found that the implementation of a no-surcharge rule increases the profits for credit card companies but decreases the welfare of consumers choosing to pay by cash and the merchants themselves. The credit card in their model is provided by a for-profit company to heterogeneous consumers and monopolistic merchants in an open system.

Schwartz and Vincent also analyzed the no-surcharge rule in a competing platform setting with cashback rebates. Their article does not analyse the welfare implication of the no-surcharge rule. However, they provide a framework on the competition between two platforms and how to understand the equilibrium in setting their fees. Their main finding is that there exists no pure Nash equilibrium in setting the fees under the NSR.

== See also ==
- Cabcharge
- Interchange fee
- Expressions Hair Design v. Schneiderman
