= Michael J. Saylor =

American entrepreneur and business executive (born 1965)

Michael Saylor
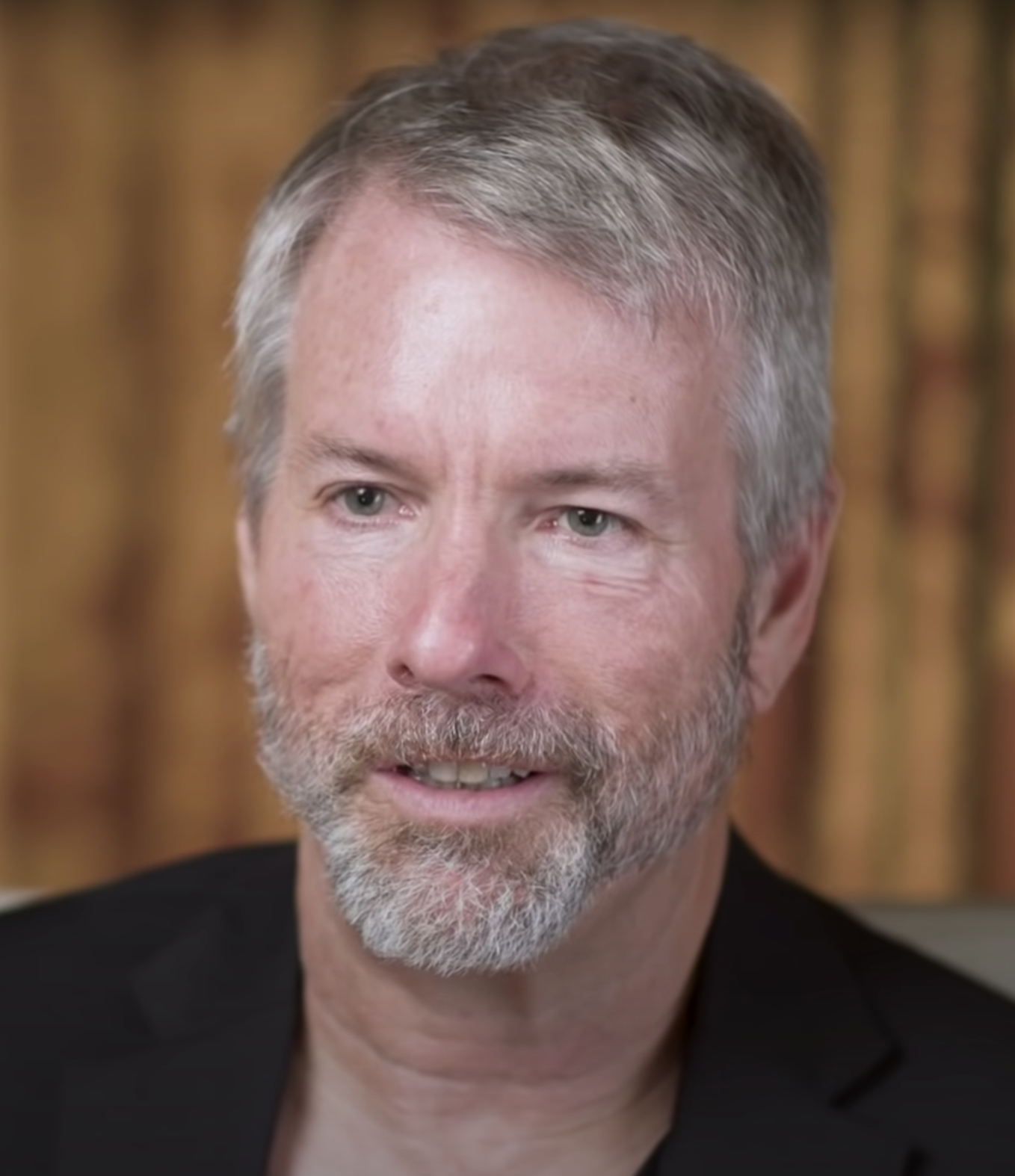
- Saylor in 2022
- Born: Michael Jerry Saylor; 4 February 1965 (age 61); Lincoln, Nebraska, U.S.
- Education: Massachusetts Institute of Technology (BS)
- Occupations: Entrepreneur; business executive
- Years active: 1987–present
- Notable work: The Mobile Wave
- Title: Executive chairman of MicroStrategy

Michael Jerry Saylor (born February 4, 1965) is an American entrepreneur and billionaire business executive. He is the executive chairman and co-founder of Strategy Inc., formerly known as MicroStrategy, a company that provides business intelligence, mobile software, and cloud-based services.

Saylor is a bitcoin advocate and strongly supports organizations adding bitcoin to their balance sheets. Under Saylor MicroStrategy has spent billions of dollars to purchase over 800,000 bitcoins. He authored the 2012 book The Mobile Wave: How Mobile Intelligence Will Change Everything. He is also the sole trustee of Saylor Academy, a provider of free online education.

== Early life and education ==
Saylor was born in Lincoln, Nebraska, on February 4, 1965, and spent his early years on various Air Force bases around the world, as his father was an Air Force chief master sergeant. When Saylor was 11, the family settled in Fairborn, Ohio, near the Wright-Patterson Air Force Base.

In 1983, Saylor enrolled at the Massachusetts Institute of Technology (MIT) on an Air Force Reserve Officers' Training Corps (ROTC) full scholarship. He joined the Theta Delta Chi fraternity, through which he met his future co-founder of MicroStrategy, Sanju Bansal. Saylor double majored in aeronautical & astronautical engineering and history of science.

A medical condition prevented him from becoming a pilot, and instead, he got a job with a consulting firm, The Federal Group, Inc. in 1987, where he focused on computer simulation modeling for a software integration company. In 1988, Saylor became an internal consultant at DuPont, where he developed computer models to help the company anticipate change in its key markets. The simulations predicted that there would be a recession in many of DuPont's major markets in 1990.

As of 2016, Saylor had been granted 31 patents and had nine additional applications under review.

== MicroStrategy ==
Using the funds from DuPont, Saylor founded MicroStrategy with Sanju Bansal, his MIT fraternity brother. The company began developing software for data mining, then focused on software for business intelligence. In 1992, MicroStrategy won a $10 million contract with McDonald's to develop applications to analyze the efficiency of its promotions. The contract with McDonald's led Saylor to realize that his company could create business intelligence software that would allow companies to use their data for insights into their businesses.

Saylor took the company public in June 1998, with an initial stock offering of 4 million shares priced at $12 each. The stock price doubled on the first day of trading. By early 2000, Saylor's net worth reached $7 billion, and the Washingtonian reported that he was the wealthiest man in the Washington D.C. area.

In 1996, Saylor was named KPMG "Washington High-Tech Entrepreneur of the Year". In 1997, Ernst & Young named Saylor its "Software Entrepreneur of the Year", and Saylor was also listed by the MIT Technology Review as an "Innovator Under 35" in 1999.

On March 20, 2000, MicroStrategy announced that it would restate its financial results for the previous two years. MicroStrategy’s stock price, which had soared from $7 per share to as high as $333 per share over the course of a year, plummeted 62 percent, dropping to $120 per share in a single day. This significant decline is considered one of the key events marking the burst of the dot-com bubble. By August 2000, approximately two-dozen class action securities fraud actions against Microstrategy were filed in the United States District Court for the Eastern District of Virginia against the company. In December 2000, the U.S. Securities and Exchange Commission filed fraud charges against MicroStrategy and its executives. MicroStrategy ultimately settled with the SEC, agreeing to hire an independent director to ensure ongoing regulatory compliance.

After his leadership was criticized by several major investors in 2014, Saylor opted for a symbolic one-dollar salary without any cash bonuses, but with stock options. According to Bloomberg, Saylor exercised those option for around $400 million in the first quarter of 2024.

On August 8, 2022, Saylor assumed the title of executive chairman of MicroStrategy and appointed Phong Le, the company's president, to succeed him as CEO. Saylor said in a press release, "As Executive Chairman I will be able to focus more on our bitcoin acquisition strategy and related bitcoin advocacy initiatives, while Phong will be empowered as CEO to manage overall corporate operations."

As of November 2024, Saylor owns 19,998,580 shares (Class B common stock), about 9.9% of the total outstanding shares, and has approximately 45% of the voting power. This increase in shares is mainly due to a MSTR stock split on August 8th 2024 at a 10:1 ratio for both class A and B shares.

In February 2025, the company rebranded from MicroStrategy to Strategy. The new logo was destined to include a stylized “B”, signifying the company’s bitcoin strategy. The brand’s primary color was also changed to orange, “representing energy, intelligence, and bitcoin”.

== Bitcoin advocacy ==
Saylor is an advocate of bitcoin, stating that he believes it will displace gold as a non-governmental store of value. Saylor has said that "capital preservation" is Bitcoin's utility and compares buying it to buying a home in a city everyone wants to move to. According to Saylor, bitcoin is "the apex property of the human race."

On MicroStrategy's quarterly earnings conference call in July 2020, Saylor announced his intention for MicroStrategy to explore purchasing bitcoin, gold, or other alternative assets instead of holding cash. The following month, MicroStrategy used $250 million from its cash stockpile to purchase 21,454 bitcoins. This bitcoin purchase popularized the term digital asset treasury (DAT) for public companies holding cryptocurrency as a treasury asset.

MicroStrategy later added $175 million of bitcoin to its holdings in September 2020 and another $50 million in early December 2020. On December 11, 2020, MicroStrategy announced that it had sold $650 million in convertible senior notes, taking on debt to increase its Bitcoin holdings to over $1 billion worth. On December 21, 2020, MicroStrategy announced their total holdings include 70,470 bitcoins purchased for $1.125 billion at an average price of $15,964 per bitcoin. As of 29 June 2026, holdings include 847,363 bitcoins acquired for $64.10 billion at an average price of $75,651 per bitcoin.

Despite criticism from skeptics like Peter Schiff, Saylor remains confident in Bitcoin as an inflation hedge and a transformative financial asset. In 2024, after the election of Donald Trump, Saylor expressed a willingness to advise on crypto policy, potentially serving on a crypto advisory council for the Trump administration.

== Political views ==
=== COVID-19 response criticism ===
In a 3,000-word memo to all MicroStrategy employees on March 16, 2020, entitled "My Thoughts on COVID-19," Saylor criticized countermeasures then being recommended against the disease, saying that it is "soul-stealing and debillitating [sic] to embrace the notion of social distancing & economic hibernation" and predicting that in the worst-case scenario, global life expectancy would only "click down by a few weeks." Saylor also refused to close MicroStrategy's offices unless he was legally required to do so. The full content of the memo appeared on Reddit for only a few minutes and was reposted in the Washington Business Journal.

== The Mobile Wave ==
In June 2012, Saylor released The Mobile Wave: How Mobile Intelligence Will Change Everything, published by Perseus Books, which discusses trends in mobile technology and their future impact on commerce, healthcare, education, and the developing world. The book appeared on the New York Times Best Seller list, where it was ranked number seven in hardcover non-fiction books in August 2012, and was ranked number five in hardcover business books on the Wall Street Journal's Best-Sellers list in July 2012.

== Saylor Academy ==
In 1999, Saylor established The Saylor Foundation (later named Saylor Academy), of which he is the sole trustee. Saylor.org was launched in 2008 as the free education initiative of The Saylor Foundation.

== Awards and recognition ==
Saylor has received several awards and recognition throughout his career. In 1996, he was named KPMG High Tech Entrepreneur of the Year. His leadership at MicroStrategy earned him a spot on Ernst & Young's Entrepreneur of the Year list in 1997. Additionally, Saylor has been featured in various industry publications and lists, recognizing his influence and impact on the tech industry and digital currency advocacy.

== Controversies ==
=== SEC investigation ===
In March 2000, the U.S. Securities and Exchange Commission (SEC) brought charges against Saylor and two other MicroStrategy executives for the company's inaccurate reporting of financial results for the preceding two years. In December 2000, Saylor settled with the SEC without admitting wrongdoing by paying $350,000 in penalties and a personal disgorgement of $8.3 million. As a result of the restatement of results, the company's stock declined in value and Saylor's net worth fell by $6 billion.

=== District of Columbia tax fraud lawsuit ===
On August 31, 2022, the Attorney General for the District of Columbia sued Saylor for tax fraud, accusing him of illegally avoiding more than $25 million in D.C. taxes by pretending to be a resident of other jurisdictions during the years 2005 to 2021. He initially claimed he resided in Virginia during the period, then later claimed that he resided in Florida. MicroStrategy was accused of collaborating with Saylor to facilitate his tax evasion by misreporting his residential address to local and federal tax authorities and failing to withhold D.C. taxes. Saylor issued a statement saying: "I respectfully disagree with the position of the District of Columbia and look forward to a fair resolution in the courts." In June 2024, Saylor settled the tax dispute by agreeing to pay a $40 million fine.
