= Deepak Gupta (attorney) =

American attorney

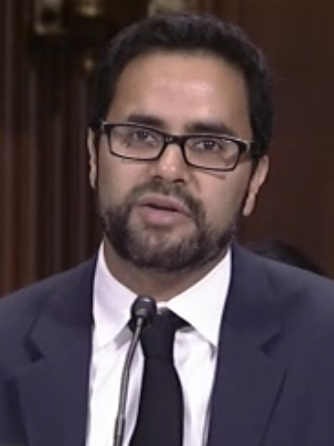
- Born: September 14, 1977 (age 48)
- Education: Fordham University (BA); University of Oxford; Georgetown University (JD)

Deepak Gupta (born September 14, 1977) is an American attorney known for representing consumers, workers, and a broad range of clients in U.S. Supreme Court and appellate cases and constitutional, class action, and complex litigation. Gupta is the founding principal of the law firm Gupta Wessler LLP and a lecturer at Harvard Law School, where he is an instructor in the Harvard Supreme Court Litigation Clinic.

== Early life and education ==
Gupta earned a Bachelor of Arts degree in philosophy from Fordham University and a Juris Doctor from the Georgetown University Law Center. He also studied Sanskrit at the University of Oxford in England. He served as a law clerk for Judge Lawrence K. Karlton.

== Career ==
He teaches as a lecturer on law at Harvard Law School, where he is an instructor in the Harvard Supreme Court Litigation Clinic, teaches seminars on the forced arbitration and public interest law, and was previously a Wasserstein Public Interest Fellow, and is a former adjunct professor of Law at Georgetown Law and American University's Washington College of Law. In 2011, Gupta became the first appellate litigator hired under Elizabeth Warren’s leadership at the Consumer Financial Protection Bureau. After leaving the CFPB in 2012, he established the firm now known as Gupta Wessler LLP. He previously worked for seven years at Public Citizen Litigation Group, where he was staff attorney and the founding director of the Consumer Justice Project and the Alan Morrison Supreme Court Assistance Project Fellow. He is an appointed member of the Administrative Conference of the United States and an elected member of the American Law Institute and serves on the boards of several organizations and academic research institutes, including the Open Markets Institute, the National Consumer Law Center, and the Lawyers' Committee for Civil Rights Under Law. Gupta has worked in the U.S Department of Justice Voting Rights Section and at the ACLU's National Prison Project and Americans United for Separation of Church and State.

Gupta was considered for a vacancy on the US Court of Appeals for the D.C. Circuit during the presidency of Joe Biden. Law360 called him "one of the emerging giants of the appellate and the Supreme Court bar," a "heavy hitter," and a “principled” and "incredibly talented lawyer."

== Notable cases ==
In 2019, Gupta became the first Asian-American invited by the U.S. Supreme Court to argue as a court-appointed amicus (in support of a judgment left undefended by the U.S. Solicitor General).

In 2021, Gupta argued and won a unanimous U.S. Supreme Court ruling, in Ford Motor Co. v. Montana Eighth Judicial Dist., on the jurisdictional limits under the Due Process Clause for consumer product liability lawsuits.

In 2022, Gupta secured a $125-million nationwide class action settlement in a lawsuit that he led against the federal judiciary, challenging fees for access to the PACER electronic records system.

In Expressions Hair Design v. Schneiderman, Gupta successfully represented retail merchants before the United States Supreme Court in a First Amendment challenge to state laws, enacted at the behest of the credit-card industry, that hid the cost of credit cards from consumers.

Gupta argued the case of AT&T Mobility v. Concepcion for the respondent before the United States Supreme Court. This landmark case concerned the validity of forced arbitration clauses used by companies to suppress group claims of discrimination, harassment, wage theft, deceptive practices, and predatory lending.

== Selected publications ==
- Deepak Gupta, The Consumer Bureau and the Constitution, 65 Admin L. Rev. 945 (2013)
- Deepak Gupta, Leveling the Playing Field on Appeal: The Case for a Plaintiff-Side Appellate Bar, 54 Duq. L. Rev. 383 (2016)
- Deepak Gupta & Lina Khan, Arbitration as Wealth Transfer, 5 Yale L. & Pol’y Rev. 499 (2017)
