= Honeycutt v. United States =

- Supreme Court of the United States

Decided June 5, 2017
- Full case name: Honeycutt v. United States
- Docket no.: 16-142
- Citations: 581 U.S. 443 (more)

Holding
- There is no joint and several liability for forfeitures in federal conspiracy judgments when a party did not personally benefit from the crime.

Court membership
- Chief Justice John Roberts Associate Justices Anthony Kennedy · Clarence Thomas; Ruth Bader Ginsburg · Stephen Breyer; Samuel Alito · Sonia Sotomayor; Elena Kagan · Neil Gorsuch

Case opinion
- Majority: Sotomayor, joined by unanimous
- Gorsuch took no part in the consideration or decision of the case.

Honeycutt v. United States, 581 U.S. 443 (2017), was a United States Supreme Court case in which the court held that there is no joint and several liability for forfeitures in federal conspiracy judgments when a party did not personally benefit from the crime.

== Background ==
Terry Honeycutt managed sales and inventory for a Tennessee hardware store owned by his brother, Tony Honeycutt. After they were indicted for federal drug crimes including conspiracy to distribute a product used in methamphetamine production, the government sought judgments against each brother in the amount of $269,751.98 pursuant to the Comprehensive Forfeiture Act of 1984, which mandates forfeiture of "any property constituting, or derived from, any proceeds the person obtained, directly or indirectly, as the result of" certain drug crimes. Tony pleaded guilty and agreed to forfeit $200,000. Terry went to trial and was convicted. Despite conceding that Terry had no controlling interest in the store and did not stand to benefit personally from the sales of the product, the government asked the district court to hold him jointly and severally liable for the profits from the illegal sales and sought a judgment of $69,751.98, the outstanding conspiracy profits. The district court declined to enter a forfeiture judgment against Terry, reasoning that he was a salaried employee who had not received any profits from the sales. The Sixth Circuit Court of Appeals reversed, holding that the brothers, as co-conspirators, were jointly and severally liable for any conspiracy proceeds.
