= Manrique v. United States =

- Supreme Court of the United States

Decided April 19, 2017
- Full case name: Manrique v. United States
- Docket no.: 15-7250
- Citations: 581 U.S. 116 (more)

Holding
- A defendant wishing to appeal an order imposing restitution in a deferred restitution case must file a notice of appeal from that order.

Court membership
- Chief Justice John Roberts Associate Justices Anthony Kennedy · Clarence Thomas; Ruth Bader Ginsburg · Stephen Breyer; Samuel Alito · Sonia Sotomayor; Elena Kagan · Neil Gorsuch

Case opinions
- Majority: Thomas
- Dissent: Ginsburg, joined by Sotomayor
- Gorsuch took no part in the consideration or decision of the case.

Manrique v. United States, 581 U.S. 116 (2017), was a United States Supreme Court case in which the court held that a defendant wishing to appeal an order imposing restitution in a deferred restitution case must file a notice of appeal from that order.
