= Town of Chester v. Laroe Estates, Inc. =

- Supreme Court of the United States

Decided June 5, 2017
- Full case name: Town of Chester v. Laroe Estates, Inc.
- Docket no.: 16-605
- Citations: 581 U.S. 433 (more)

Holding
- A litigant seeking to intervene as of right under Federal Rule of Civil Procedure 24(a)(2) must meet the requirements of Article III standing if the intervenor wishes to pursue relief not requested by a plaintiff.

Court membership
- Chief Justice John Roberts Associate Justices Anthony Kennedy · Clarence Thomas; Ruth Bader Ginsburg · Stephen Breyer; Samuel Alito · Sonia Sotomayor; Elena Kagan · Neil Gorsuch

Case opinion
- Majority: Alito, joined by unanimous

Laws applied
- Fed. R. Civ. P. 24(a)(2)

Town of Chester v. Laroe Estates, Inc., 581 U.S. 433 (2017), was a United States Supreme Court case in which the court held that a litigant seeking to intervene as of right under Federal Rule of Civil Procedure 24(a)(2) must meet the requirements of Article III standing if the intervenor wishes to pursue relief not requested by a plaintiff.
