= MicroStrategy =

American technology company

Strategy Inc.
- Logo used since 2025
- Trade name: Strategy
- Formerly: MicroStrategy Incorporated (1989–2025)
- Type: Public
- Traded as: Nasdaq: MSTR (Class A); Nasdaq-100 component
- Industry: Bitcoin treasury; Business intelligence; Mobile software
- Founded: 1989; 37 years ago
- Founders: Michael J. Saylor; Sanju Bansal; Thomas Spahr
- Headquarters: Tysons Corner, Virginia, U.S.
- Key people: Michael J. Saylor (executive chairman); Phong Le (president & CEO)
- Revenue: ▲US$477 million (2025)
- Operating income: ▼US$−5.4 billion (2025)
- Net income: ▼US$−4.2 billion (2025)
- Total assets: ▲US$61.6 billion (2025)
- Total equity: ▲US$44.1 billion (2025)
- Number of employees: 1,539 (2025)
- ASN: 13410
- Website: strategy.com; strategysoftware.com

Strategy Inc., stylized as Strategy^{₿} and formerly known as MicroStrategy, is an American company that provides business intelligence (BI) and mobile software. Founded in 1989 by Michael J. Saylor, Sanju Bansal, and Thomas Spahr, the firm develops software to analyze internal and external data in order to make business decisions and to develop mobile apps. It is a public company headquartered in Tysons Corner, Virginia, in the Washington metropolitan area. Its primary business analytics competitors include SAP SE Business Objects, IBM Cognos, and Oracle Corporation's BI Platform. Saylor is the executive chairman and, from 1989 to 2022, was the CEO.

Since 2020, the company's securities are widely considered to be a bitcoin proxy due to Strategy's holdings of the cryptocurrency. Saylor has compared it to a bitcoin spot leveraged ETF, though it is not a regulated investment fund.

As of November 17, 2025, Strategy was reported to own over 650,000 bitcoins, worth roughly $59.69 billion, and is the largest corporate holder of the asset. This strategy has primarily been driven by Saylor.

== History ==
Logo prior to 2025

Saylor started MicroStrategy in 1989 with a consulting contract from DuPont, which provided Saylor with $250,000 in start-up capital and office space in Wilmington, Delaware. Saylor was soon joined by company co-founder Sanju Bansal, whom he had met while the two were students at Massachusetts Institute of Technology (MIT). The company produced software for data mining and business intelligence using nonlinear mathematics, an idea inspired by a course on systems-dynamics theory that they took at MIT.

In 1992, MicroStrategy gained its first major client when it signed a $10 million contract with McDonald's. It increased revenues by 100% each year between 1990 and 1996. In 1994, the company's offices and its 50 employees moved from Delaware to Tysons Corner, Virginia.

On June 11, 1998, MicroStrategy became a public company via an initial public offering. The company sold 36 million shares of its common stock, each share priced at $6, under the stock ticker "MSTR" on the NASDAQ stock exchange.

In 2000, MicroStrategy founded Alarm.com as part of its research and development unit.

On March 20, 2000, after a review of its accounting practices, MicroStrategy announced that it would restate its financial results for the preceding two years. Its stock price, which had risen from $7 per share to as high as $333 per share in a year, lost $140 (62% of its value) in a day, in what is regarded as the bursting of the dot-com bubble.

Following MicroStrategy Inc.'s March 20, 2000 announcement that it had significantly overstated its 1998 and 1999 revenues, approximately two dozen class action securities fraud actions were filed in the United States District Court for the Eastern District of Virginia against MicroStrategy. In December 2000, the U.S. Securities and Exchange Commission brought charges against the company and its executives. A lawsuit was subsequently filed against MicroStrategy and certain of its officials over fraud. In December 2000, Saylor, Bansal, and the company's former CFO settled with the SEC without admitting wrongdoing, each paying $350,000 in fines. The officers also paid a combined total of $10 million in disgorgement. The company settled with the SEC, hiring an independent director to ensure regulatory compliance.

In February 2009, MicroStrategy sold Alarm.com to venture capital firm ABS Capital Partners for $27.7 million. The company introduced OLAP Services with a shared data set cache to accelerate reports and ad hoc queries. In 2010, the company began developing and deploying business intelligence software for mobile platforms, such as the iPhone and iPad.

In 2011, MicroStrategy expanded its offerings to include a cloud-based service, MicroStrategy Cloud.

In 2013, MicroStrategy sold Angel to Genesys Telecommunications Laboratories for $110 million.

In August 2022, the attorney general for the District of Columbia sued Saylor for tax fraud, accusing him of illegally avoiding more than $25 million in D.C. taxes by pretending to be a resident of other jurisdictions. MicroStrategy was accused of collaborating with Saylor to facilitate his tax evasion by misreporting his residential address to local and federal tax authorities and failing to withhold D.C. taxes. MicroStrategy said the case is "a personal tax matter involving Mr. Saylor" and called the claims against the company "false" and it would "defend aggressively against this overreach". In June 2024, Saylor and MicroStrategy reached a $40 million settlement agreement with the District of Columbia.

Saylor resigned as CEO effective August 8, 2022. Phong Le, who had been president, succeeded him. Saylor remains the executive chairman of MicroStrategy. In a press release announcing the transition, Saylor said that he would focus on the company's bitcoin acquisition strategy and that Phong would manage overall corporate operations.

== Bitcoin purchases ==
In August 2020, MicroStrategy invested $250 million in bitcoin as a treasury reserve asset, citing declining returns from cash, a weakening dollar, and other global macroeconomic factors. The company went on to make several additional large purchases of bitcoin; on September 19, 2022, MicroStrategy and its subsidiaries held approximately 130,000 BTC, acquired at an aggregate purchase price of $3.98 billion at an average purchase price of $30,639 per bitcoin. Executive chairman Saylor has been described as working to "funnel nearly all of Strategy’s available funds" into Bitcoin.

On the company's quarterly earnings call on May 3, 2022, MicroStrategy CFO Phong Le stated that the company would face a margin call if bitcoin's price fell to about $21,000. A margin call would obligate the company to sell some of its bitcoin holdings. Le stated that the company could add more collateral to its loan to avoid such a situation. After bitcoin's price fell to about $20,800 in June 2022, the company said that it had not received a margin call and that it had enough capital to withstand further volatility. On December 22, 2022, MicroStrategy sold 704 BTC, which represented its first time selling any bitcoin, for an amount of around $11.8 million.

On September 25, 2023, MicroStrategy announced that, during the period between August 1, 2023, and September 24, 2023, MicroStrategy and its subsidiaries acquired 5,445 bitcoins for $147.3 million in cash, at an average price of $27,053 per bitcoin, inclusive of fees and expenses.

As of December 8, 2024, MicroStrategy was reported to own 423,650 bitcoins, worth $42.43 billion, and is the largest corporate holder of the asset. Like other cryptocurrency treasury firms, MicroStrategy doesn't give investors on-chain data that would allow public verification of its reserves. MicroStrategy purchased 149,880 bitcoins in the month beginning on November 11, 2024. On the strength of this asset, MicroStrategy was included in the Nasdaq-100 effective December 23, 2024.

A further 4,225 bitcoins were acquired between July 7–13, 2025 for $472.5M at an average price of $111,827 per Bitcoin.

Strategy has launched four credit instruments in the second and third quarter of 2025 worth $4 billion, with more to come. Michael Saylor told Bloomberg that these are high-yield perpetual securities aiming to reduce bitcoin volatility and risk for investors.

In late November 2025 Forbes reported that the shares of Strategy had dropped by 60% compared to the previous year, with its market capitalization down to $49 billion, which was below the value of the $56 billion in bitcoin it was holding at the same time. This was followed by a statement from Strategy CEO Phong Le about a potential sell of bitcoins by Strategy, which market observers saw as a contributing factor in a drop of bitcoin price below $86,000 in early December 2025.

== Products ==
MicroStrategy Analytics
- Developer: MicroStrategy
- Stable release: MicroStrategy 2019 / January 7, 2019; 7 years ago
- Operating system: Microsoft Windows, Linux, AIX (no longer supported), Solaris (no longer supported)
- Type: Business intelligence
- License: Trialware
- Website: www.microstrategy.com/us/platform

MicroStrategy 2020 is the latest platform release of the company's business intelligence software.

MicroStrategy 2019, the prior platform release, attempted to improve connectivity to data sources and applications and allow for easier mobile application development. it also offered Bluetooth identity detection and voice. The earlier suite of software, MicroStrategy 10, consisted of MicroStrategy Analytics, MicroStrategy Mobile, and Usher. MicroStrategy 10.10, released in December 2017, added MicroStrategy Workstation. It uses business intelligence and predictive analytics to search through and perform analytics on big data from a variety of sources, including data warehouses, Excel files, and Apache Hadoop distributions.

MicroStrategy Mobile, introduced in 2010, incorporates analytics capabilities to apps for iPhone, iPad, Android, and BlackBerry.

Usher is a digital credential and identity intelligence product for organizations to control digital and physical access. It replaces physical badges and passwords with secure digital badges, and generates information on user behavior and resource usage.
