= Expressions Hair Design v. Schneiderman =

- Supreme Court of the United States

Argued January 10, 2017 Decided March 29, 2017
- Full case name: Expressions Hair Design, Linda Fiacco, Brooklyn Farmacy & Soda Fountain, Inc., Peter Freeman, Bunda Starr Corp., Donna Pabst, Five Points Academy, Steve Milles, Patio.com, and David Ross v. Eric T. Schneiderman, in his official capacity as Attorney General of the State of New York; Cyrus R. Vance, Jr., in his official capacity as District Attorney of New York County; Kenneth P. Thompson, in his official capacity as District Attorney of Kings County, defendants
- Docket no.: 15-1391
- Citations: 581 U.S. 37 (more) 137 S. Ct. 1144; 197 L. Ed. 2d 442

Case history
- Prior: 975 F. Supp. 2d 430 (S.D.N.Y. 2013); reversed, 808 F.3d 118 (2d Cir. 2015); cert. granted, 137 S. Ct. 30 (2016).

Holding
- Price controls, when used to prevent certain communication of the price of a good with regard to a surcharge, implicate freedom of speech as protected under the First Amendment. United States Court of Appeals for the Second Circuit reversed and remanded.

Court membership
- Chief Justice John Roberts Associate Justices Anthony Kennedy · Clarence Thomas; Ruth Bader Ginsburg · Stephen Breyer; Samuel Alito · Sonia Sotomayor; Elena Kagan

Case opinions
- Majority: Roberts, joined by Kennedy, Thomas, Ginsburg, Kagan
- Concurrence: Breyer (in judgment)
- Concurrence: Sotomayor (in judgment), joined by Alito

Laws applied
- U.S. Const. amend. I, New York General Business Law §518

Expressions Hair Design v. Schneiderman, 581 U.S. 37 (2017), was a United States Supreme Court decision that held that price controls, when used to prohibit the communication of prices of goods with regard to a surcharge, was a regulation of speech and required an analysis of the First Amendment's protections for freedom of speech.

In a five-Justice majority, Chief Justice John Roberts, joined by Associate Justices Kennedy, Thomas, Ginsburg, and Kagan, wrote that, "In regulating the communication of prices rather than prices themselves," the law in question "regulates speech."

== Background ==
In contracting with credit card companies, retailers are typically assessed a fee whenever a credit card is used. In order to compensate for these losses in revenue, merchants are given two options: either charge the customer a surcharge based on their use of credit cards, or provide a discount to customers paying with cash. In regards to the former option—charging the customer a surcharge—the New York Legislature enacted a law, §518, which banned this practice, in that, "[n]o seller in any sales transaction may impose a surcharge on a holder who elects to use a credit card in lieu of payment by cash, check, or similar means." Additionally, the New York Legislature was not the only legislative body which had banned surcharges before. Congress passed a law in 1981 that banned the use of surcharges in pricing goods, but this ban expired in 1984.

The Attorney General of New York, Eric Schneiderman, argued that because price controls prohibit conduct, but not speech, then there is no reasonable claim to a violation of free speech. On January 10, 2017, one-hour of oral arguments were heard, where Deepak Gupta appeared for the hairdressers, an assistant to the Solicitor General of the United States appeared as an amicus curiae is support of neither party, and a deputy solicitor general of New York appeared for that state.

== Opinion of the Court ==
On March 29, 2017, the Supreme Court delivered judgment in favor of the merchants, voting unanimously to vacate and remand to the lower court. Roberts authored the opinion of the Court, joined by Kennedy, Thomas, Ginsburg and Kagan. The Court argued that, because §518 does not regulate the price that may be received by a business, as per usual price control, but rather the communication of prices, "§ 518 regulates speech."

Justice Stephen Breyer issued a concurrence in the judgement, arguing that while the statute does limit speech, all human interactions limit speech as well. However, Breyer argued that because the statute was effectually under state law, that it should be remanded to the Second Circuit.

Justice Sonia Sotomayor, joined by Justice Alito, issued a concurrence only in the judgement. She argued that it should be left to the Second Circuit to interpret and to certify the meaning of §518, which could be done on remand. The "complexity" of the case, she argues, could have been avoided had the lower courts decided to interpret the law.
