= Water Splash, Inc. v. Menon =

- Supreme Court of the United States

Argued March 22, 2017 Decided May 22, 2017
- Full case name: Water Splash, Inc., Petitioner v. Tara Menon
- Docket no.: 16-254
- Citations: 581 U.S. 271 (more) 137 S. Ct. 1504; 197 L. Ed. 2d 826
- Opinion announcement: Opinion announcement

Holding
- The Hague Service Convention permits service of judicial process abroad by mail, provided that the country in which the service takes place has not objected to service by mail, and service by mail is authorized in the country where the litigation is pending.

Court membership
- Chief Justice John Roberts Associate Justices Anthony Kennedy · Clarence Thomas; Ruth Bader Ginsburg · Stephen Breyer; Samuel Alito · Sonia Sotomayor; Elena Kagan · Neil Gorsuch

Case opinion
- Majority: Alito, joined by Roberts, Kennedy, Thomas, Ginsburg, Breyer, Sotomayor, Kagan
- Gorsuch took no part in the consideration or decision of the case.

Laws applied
- Convention on the Service Abroad of Judicial and Extrajudicial Documents in Civil or Commercial Matters

Water Splash, Inc. v. Menon, 581 U.S. 271 (2017), is a United States Supreme Court case in which the Court decided that the Hague Service Convention permits service of judicial process abroad by mail, provided that the country in which the service takes place has not objected to service by mail, and service by mail is authorized in the country where the litigation is pending.

== Background of the legal question ==
The Hague Service Convention (formally called the Convention on the Service Abroad of Judicial and Extrajudicial Documents in Civil or Commercial Matters) is an international treaty promulgated by the Hague Conference on Private International Law. The United States, along with dozens of other countries, is a party to the convention. The convention establishes procedures for the service of process in one country relating to civil or commercial litigation pending in another where both countries are parties to the convention.

The default procedure authorized by the convention is to effectuate service through a "central authority" to be established by the government of each member country. Certain alternative methods (called article 8 or article 10 methods, based on their source in the convention) may also be allowed provided that the country where the litigation is pending allows that method of service, and the country where service is to be made has not objected to that method. Article 10 of the convention states (in its English version) that legal documents may be "sent" by mail. International review commissions of the Hague Service Convention and many countries that are party to the convention understood this provision as authorizing service of process by mail (unless the receiving country filed an objection to this method of service, which Canada had not done). In the United States, however, there was a split of opinions on this question among state and federal courts throughout the country.

== Background of the case ==
This case arose Water Splash, Inc.–a water playground equipment manufacturer based in New York–sued Tara Menon–a Canadian citizen living in Quebec–in a Texas state court located in Galveston, Texas. The lawsuit claimed that while Menon was working as a sales representative for Water Splash, she also worked for competitor company South Pool and misused Water Splash's designs and drawings for the competitor's benefit.

Menon maintained she never worked for a company called Water Splash Inc. but that she was an independent contractor and that the owner of Water Splash misrepresented himself and his company to her. The owner of Water Splash was a Canadian/Turkish citizen living in Montreal Canada. She was owed substantial monies for numerous contracts for which she was never paid by his Canadian company ABC Waterplay Inc., based in Montreal Canada. She claimed the lawsuit was an attempt to intimidate and avoid payments she was owed. She sued the owner of ABC Waterplay and Water Splash, Gokan Celik, in Montreal Superior court and had been paid a settlement in 2015.

Water Splash had to serve process (the summons and complaint) upon Menon in order for its case to proceed. The Texas trial court judge signed an order allowing Water Splash to serve Menon in Canada through several means, including by certified mail. Service was made as the court directed, but Menon failed to answer or appear, and the court granted a default judgment in favor of Water Splash enjoining her from a variety of business activities and ordering her to pay $60,000 in damages, $60,000 in punitive damages, $32,000 in attorney's fees, interest, and costs of court. Menon then filed an answer in the case and a motion to set aside the default judgment against her, arguing that the service of process by mail was not authorized by the Hague Service Convention or by Texas state law; the trial court denied the motion and allowed the default judgment to remain. Menon appealed to the 14th Texas Court of Appeals in Houston, which reversed the trial court's default judgment by a 2-1 split decision. The majority opinion held that Article 10 of the Hague Convention does not authorize service of process by mail in cases covered by the convention. The dissenting opinion would have held that the Hague Service Convention does authorize service of process by mail in cases covered by the convention.

The United States Supreme Court granted certiorari to resolve the question, because of the inconsistency of lower court decisions.

Water Splash argued in the United States Supreme Court that the Hague Service Convention itself authorized service of process by mail making Texas service of process law irrelevant as to whether the default judgment was valid. In contrast, Menon argued that the convention did not authorize service of process by mail and that even if the convention permitted signatory countries under their local law to authorize service of process by mail, Texas law did not authorize service by mail and therefore no matter how the convention was interpreted the default judgment was invalid because it was based on improper service of process by mail which was authorized neither by the convention nor by Texas law.

The Hague Conference and the Solicitor General filed amicus curiae briefs arguing that the Hague Service Convention permits signatory countries to authorize, under the signatories countries' local laws, service of process by mail. That is, the amicus curiae briefs argued that the convention does not itself authorize service of process between signatory countries by mail but permits signatory countries to adopt laws allowing for service of process, pursuant to the local laws, by mail. Oral argument was held on March 22, 2017. Jeremy Gaston of Houston, Texas, argued for Water Splash. Timothy A. Hootman of Houston, Texas, argued for Menon. Elaine J. Goldenberg of Washington D.C. argued for amicus curiae.

== Opinion of the court ==
Justice Samuel Alito delivered the opinion of the court, which was unanimous (except that Justice Neil Gorsuch, who joined the court after this case was orally argued, did not participate). The Supreme Court vacated the Texas Court of Appeals' decision and held that international service of process by mail in a Hague Convention signatory country is permitted (but not authorized) by the convention, as long as the receiving country has not objected to that method of service.

In holding that Article 10(a) allows service of process by mail, the court reasoned that "the scope of the Convention is limited to service of documents" and that Article 10's reference to "sending" documents by mail must, therefore, refer to a method of service. The opinion also relied on the drafting history of the convention, the executive branch's understanding of the treaty when it was negotiated, and the current views of the United States Department of State, as well as the understandings of other countries party to the treaty, all of which supported the court's interpretation.

As for the important distinction between “authorizing” and “permitting” service of process by mail, the opinion states: “In short, the traditional tools of treaty interpretation unmistakably demonstrate that Article 10(a) encompasses service by mail. To be clear, this does not mean that the convention affirmatively authorizes service by mail. Article 10(a) simply provides that, as long as the receiving state does not object, the convention does not ‘interfere with … the freedom’ to serve documents through postal channels. In other words, in cases governed by the Hague Service Convention, service by mail is permissible if two conditions are met: first, the receiving state has not objected to service by mail; and second, service by mail is authorized under otherwise-applicable law.” The authorize/permit distinction thus puts the focus on whether the local law where a lawsuit is pending (in this case, Texas) authorizes service of process by mail; if it does, then service of process by mail is permitted under the convention although the convention itself does not authorize service by mail. Because of this, the court's opinion did not resolve whether the default judgment against Menon should be set aside, and therefore, the case was remanded to the Texas 14th Court of Appeals to determine that state-law question. On remand, the Texas 14th Court of Appeals concluded that Texas law does not authorize service of process by mail and in a unanimous opinion reversed the trial court and set aside the default judgment.
