= Goodyear Tire & Rubber Co. v. Haeger =

- Supreme Court of the United States

Decided April 18, 2017
- Full case name: Goodyear Tire & Rubber Co. v. Haeger
- Docket no.: 15-1406
- Citations: 581 U.S. 101 (more)

Holding
- When a court sanctions bad-faith conduct by ordering a litigant to pay the other side’s legal fees, the award is limited to the fees the innocent party incurred solely because of the bad-faith misconduct.

Court membership
- Chief Justice John Roberts Associate Justices Anthony Kennedy · Clarence Thomas; Ruth Bader Ginsburg · Stephen Breyer; Samuel Alito · Sonia Sotomayor; Elena Kagan · Neil Gorsuch

Case opinion
- Majority: Kagan, joined by unanimous
- Gorsuch took no part in the consideration or decision of the case.

Goodyear Tire & Rubber Co. v. Haeger, 581 U.S. 101 (2017), was a United States Supreme Court case in which the court held that when a court sanctions bad-faith conduct by ordering a litigant to pay the other side’s legal fees, the award is limited to the fees the innocent party incurred solely because of the bad-faith misconduct.
