= McLane Co. v. Equal Employment Opportunity Commission =

- Supreme Court of the United States

Decided April 3, 2017
- Full case name: McLane Co. v. Equal Employment Opportunity Commission
- Docket no.: 15-1248
- Citations: 581 U.S. 72 (more)

Holding
- A district court's decision whether to enforce or quash a subpoena issued by the Equal Employment Opportunity Commission should be reviewed for abuse of discretion, not de novo.

Court membership
- Chief Justice John Roberts Associate Justices Anthony Kennedy · Clarence Thomas; Ruth Bader Ginsburg · Stephen Breyer; Samuel Alito · Sonia Sotomayor; Elena Kagan

Case opinions
- Majority: Sotomayor, joined by Roberts, Kennedy, Thomas, Breyer, Alito, Kagan
- Concur/dissent: Ginsburg

McLane Co. v. Equal Employment Opportunity Commission, 581 U.S. 72 (2017), was a United States Supreme Court case in which the Court held that a district court's decision whether to enforce or quash a subpoena issued by the Equal Employment Opportunity Commission should be reviewed for abuse of discretion, not de novo.
