= Advocate Health Care Network v. Stapleton =

- Supreme Court of the United States

Decided June 5, 2017
- Full case name: Advocate Health Care Network v. Stapleton
- Docket no.: 16-74
- Citations: 581 U.S. 468 (more)

Holding
- A plan maintained by a principal-purpose organization qualifies as a "church plan," regardless of who established it.

Court membership
- Chief Justice John Roberts Associate Justices Anthony Kennedy · Clarence Thomas; Ruth Bader Ginsburg · Stephen Breyer; Samuel Alito · Sonia Sotomayor; Elena Kagan · Neil Gorsuch

Case opinions
- Majority: Kagan, joined by unanimous
- Concurrence: Sotomayor
- Gorsuch took no part in the consideration or decision of the case.

Advocate Health Care Network v. Stapleton, 581 U.S. 468 (2017), was a United States Supreme Court case in which the court held that a plan maintained by a principal-purpose organization qualifies as a "church plan," regardless of who established it.

== Background ==
The Employee Retirement Income Security Act of 1974 (ERISA) generally obligates private employers offering pension plans to adhere to an array of rules designed to ensure plan solvency and protect plan participants. "[C]hurch plan[s]," however, are exempt from those regulations. From the beginning, ERISA has defined a "church plan" as "a plan established and maintained... for its employees... by a church." Congress then amended the statute to expand that definition, adding the provision whose effect is at issue here: "A plan established and maintained for its employees... by a church... includes a plan maintained by an organization... the principal purpose... of which is the administration or funding of [such] plan... for the employees of a church..., if such organization is controlled by or associated with a church." This organizations are also called "principal-purpose organizations.")

Three church-affiliated nonprofits, including Advocate Health Care Network, that run hospitals and other healthcare facilities (collectively, hospitals), offer their employees defined-benefit pension plans. Those plans were established by the hospitals themselves, and are managed by internal employee-benefits committees. Current and former hospital employees, including Maria Stapleton, filed class actions alleging that the hospitals' pension plans did not fall within ERISA's church-plan exemption because they were not established by a church. The federal district courts, agreeing with the employees, held that a plan must be established by a church to qualify as a church plan. The Courts of Appeals affirmed.

== Opinion of the court ==
The Court unanimously reversed the lower courts, holding that a plan maintained by a church-affiliated "principal-purpose organization" can qualify as a church plan even if a church did not establish it. Justice Elena Kagan wrote the opinion; Justice Neil Gorsuch did not participate.

Kagan explained that Congress's 1980 amendment expanded ERISA's definition of a church plan to include plans maintained by these organizations. Requiring a church to have established the plan would make some of the amendment's wording redundant. The Court did not decide whether the hospitals' benefits committees qualified as principal-purpose organizations or whether the hospitals had the required church affiliations.

Justice Sonia Sotomayor joined the opinion but wrote a separate concurrence. She agreed with the Court's reading of the statute but questioned whether Congress had intended the exemption to cover large healthcare organizations resembling secular businesses. She expressed concern that their employees could be left without ERISA's protections.

== Subsequent developments ==
In June 2018, a federal district court approved a settlement in the Advocate case. Advocate agreed to guarantee pension benefits for ten years from January 2018 and pay $300 to certain former employees.

In July 2022, a federal district court approved a $100 million settlement in the companion case Rollins v. Dignity Health.

In 2023, the district court in Kaplan v. Saint Peter's Healthcare System ruled that the hospital's plan qualified for the church-plan exemption. It found that the hospital and its retirement plan committee were associated with the Catholic Church and that the committee qualified as a principal-purpose organization.
