= Paul Deninger =

US entrepreneur, investment banker, venture capitalist

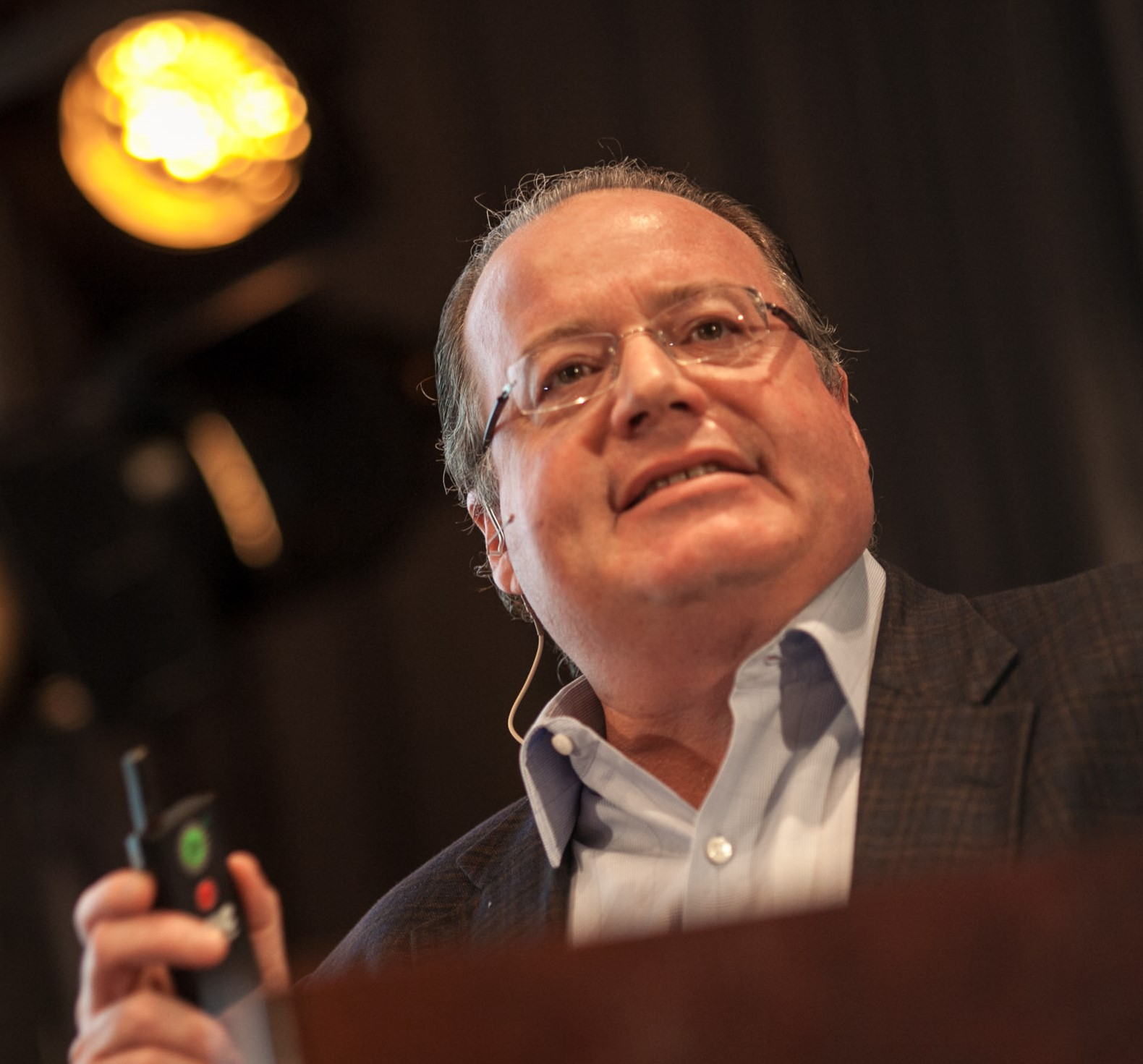
- Born: August 3, 1958 (age 67); Stoughton, Massachusetts, United States
- Occupation(s): Entrepreneur and venture capitalist
- Known for: Chairman and director

Paul Deninger (born August 3, 1958, in Stoughton, MA) is an American technology industry entrepreneur, board member, investment banker, and venture capitalist.

== Early life and education ==
Paul Deninger was born in 1958 in Stoughton, MA. He earned a Bachelor of Science from Boston College and later an MBA from Harvard Business School.

== Career ==
Deninger joined the technology M&A firm Broadview International in 1987, where he was first an associate. He became CEO in 1996 and served for eight years before selling the firm to Jefferies. Following the acquisition of Broadview by Jefferies, Deninger remained at Jefferies, where he served as Vice Chairman. While at Jefferies, he did his first deals in sustainability and CleanTech, the area in tech he is currently focusing on.

After Jefferies, he joined Evercore as a Senior Managing Director and retired from that firm in 2020 as a Senior Advisor. A leading independent investment bank, the firm became a major player serving the technology industry during his tenure.

He advised on more than 100 M&A transactions and many equity financings and IPOs.

As of 2024, Deninger is an Operating Partner at Material Impact, a venture firm that invests in deep tech companies. He advises a broad range of the fund's portfolio companies in such areas as material science, sustainable manufacturing, robotics and space technology. Material Impact was founded by Adam Sharkawy and Carmichael Roberts, who is also chairman of the investment committee of Bill Gates’s Breakthrough Energy Ventures.

Deninger also serves as Chairman of Generation Phoenix Ltd, a UK-based material science company that reclaims leather offcuts to produce leather material used in manufacturing footwear, luxury goods, and transportation seating. Gen Phoenix was recently named one of Fast Company’s Most Innovative Companies.

He was named among the "100 Most Influential People in Technology" by Red Herring Magazine several times and recognized as one of the "25 Most Powerful People in Networking" by Network World. He also attended the World Economic Forum in Davos for 14 years.

== Board memberships ==
Paul Deninger serves on two public boards, Resideo and EverQuote. He previously served on two other public boards, Iron Mountain and Netegrity. He has also served on the boards of several private, venture-backed companies.
