= Howell v. Howell =

- Supreme Court of the United States

Decided May 15, 2017
- Full case name: Howell v. Howell
- Docket no.: 15-1031
- Citations: 581 U.S. 214 (more)

Holding
- A state court may not order a veteran to indemnify a divorced spouse for the loss in the divorced spouse's portion of the veteran's retirement pay caused by the veteran's waiver of retirement pay to receive service-related disability benefits.

Court membership
- Chief Justice John Roberts Associate Justices Anthony Kennedy · Clarence Thomas; Ruth Bader Ginsburg · Stephen Breyer; Samuel Alito · Sonia Sotomayor; Elena Kagan · Neil Gorsuch

Case opinion
- Majority: Breyer, joined by unanimous
- Gorsuch took no part in the consideration or decision of the case.

Howell v. Howell, 581 U.S. 214 (2017), was a United States Supreme Court case in which the court held that a state court may not order a veteran to indemnify a divorced spouse for the loss in the divorced spouse's portion of the veteran's retirement pay caused by the veteran's waiver of retirement pay to receive service-related disability benefits.
