= White v. Pauly =

- Supreme Court of the United States

Decided January 9, 2017
- Full case name: White v. Pauly
- Docket no.: 16-67
- Citations: 580 U.S. 73 (more)

Holding
- An officer did not violate clearly established law and was entitled to qualified immunity when he arrived late at an ongoing police action, saw shots being fired by people inside a house surrounded by other officers, and fatally shot an armed occupant of the house without first giving a warning.

Court membership
- Chief Justice John Roberts Associate Justices Anthony Kennedy · Clarence Thomas; Ruth Bader Ginsburg · Stephen Breyer; Samuel Alito · Sonia Sotomayor; Elena Kagan

Case opinion
- Per curiam

White v. Pauly, 580 U.S. 73 (2017), was a United States Supreme Court case in which the court held that an officer did not violate clearly established law and was entitled to qualified immunity when he arrived late at an ongoing police action, saw shots being fired by people inside a house surrounded by other officers, and fatally shot an armed occupant of the house without first giving a warning.

== Background ==
On the evening of October 4, 2011, Daniel Pauly was followed by two women during a road rage incident on Interstate 25 near Santa Fe, New Mexico. One of the women called 911 to report a "drunk driver." After a confrontation with the women at an off-ramp, Daniel drove a short distance to the house where he lived with his brother, Samuel. The house was in a wooded area on a hill behind a main house.

Officer Truesdale arrived at the exit to speak to the women about the 911 call. The women told Truesdale that Daniel was driving recklessly. They described his truck and provided a license plate number. Police dispatch said the truck was registered to an address near the exit. The women left, and Officers White and Mariscal arrived.

The officers agreed that they could not arrest Daniel based on this information. Nevertheless, the officers decided to find Daniel to see if they might learn anything incriminating. Truesdale and Mariscal went to Daniel's house. White stayed at the off-ramp in case Daniel returned.

Officers Mariscal and Truesdale proceeded to Daniel's address and parked near the main house without flashing their lights. The officers noticed the second house with its lights on. They approached the second house while using their flashlights as little as possible, concealing themselves from the occupants. When they saw Daniel's truck and confirmed people were inside, they contacted Officer White, who left to join them.

At roughly 11:00 p.m., the brothers saw flashlights approaching the house. Daniel could not tell who was approaching because of the dark and the rain, but he feared it could be intruders related to the prior road rage altercation. Daniel did not consider that it could have been police officers. The brothers hollered several times, "Who are you?" and, "What do you want?" In response, the officers laughed and said: "Hey, (expletive), we got you surrounded. Come out or we're coming in." Truesdale also shouted once, "Open the door, State Police, open the door." Daniel did not hear anyone say "State Police" until after the altercation was over.

Fearing for their lives and the safety of their dogs, the brothers decided to call the police to report the unknown intruders. Before Daniel could call 911, however, he heard someone yell: "We're coming in. We're coming in." Believing that their home was actively being invaded, Samuel retrieved a loaded handgun for himself and a shotgun for Daniel. Daniel told Samuel that he would fire warning shots while Samuel went to the front of the house. One of the brothers then hollered, "We have guns." Truesdale shouted, "Open the door, come outside."

Meanwhile, White approached the house, using his flashlight intermittently. He saw people moving inside the house and arrived just as one of the brothers said: "We have guns." White immediately drew his weapon and took cover behind a wall fifty feet away.

Daniel, concerned about the officers' earlier threatening statements, stepped partially out of the back door and fired two warning shots while screaming loudly to scare anyone off. A few seconds after Daniel fired the warning shots, Mariscal and White saw Samuel open the front window and point a handgun in White's direction. Mariscal immediately shot at Samuel but missed. Four to five seconds after Samuel looked out, White fatally shot Samuel. These events happened in less than five minutes.

== Opinion of the court ==
The Supreme Court issued an opinion on January 9, 2017.

== Subsequent developments ==
When the Tenth Circuit reheard the case in 2017, Pauly lost. Pauly petitioned the Supreme Court for review of that decision, but they did not hear the case. Justice Neil Gorsuch, new on the bench, did not participate in that decision.
