= Dean v. United States (2017) =

- Supreme Court of the United States

Decided April 3, 2017
- Full case name: Dean v. United States
- Docket no.: 15-9260
- Citations: 581 U.S. 62 (more)

Holding
- Section 924(c), which provides mandatory minimum sentences for the use of a firearm during certain crimes, does not prevent a sentencing court from considering a mandatory minimum imposed under that provision when calculating an appropriate sentence for the predicate offense.

Court membership
- Chief Justice John Roberts Associate Justices Anthony Kennedy · Clarence Thomas; Ruth Bader Ginsburg · Stephen Breyer; Samuel Alito · Sonia Sotomayor; Elena Kagan

Case opinion
- Majority: Roberts, joined by unanimous

Laws applied
- 18 U.S.C. § 924(c)

Dean v. United States, 581 U.S. 62 (2017), was a United States Supreme Court case in which the court held that Section 924(c), which provides mandatory minimum sentences for the use of a firearm during certain crimes, does not prevent a sentencing court from considering a mandatory minimum imposed under that provision when calculating an appropriate sentence for the predicate offense.

== Background ==
Levon Dean, Jr. and his brother committed two robberies of drug dealers. During each robbery, Dean's brother threatened and assaulted the victim with a gun, while Dean searched the premises for valuables. Dean was convicted of multiple robbery and firearms counts, as well as two counts of possessing a firearm in furtherance of a crime of violence, in violation of 18 U.S.C. §924(c). Section 924(c) criminalizes using or carrying a firearm during and in relation to a crime of violence or drug trafficking crime, or possessing a firearm in furtherance of such an underlying crime. That provision mandates a distinct penalty to be imposed "in addition to the punishment provided for [the predicate] crime." Further, Section 924(c) says that any sentence mandated by that provision must run consecutively to "any other term of imprisonment imposed on the person," including any sentence for the predicate crime. A first conviction under §924(c) carries a five-year mandatory minimum penalty, while a second conviction carries an additional 25-year mandatory minimum. For Dean, that meant a 30-year mandatory minimum, to be served after and in addition to any sentence he received for his other counts of conviction.

At sentencing, Dean urged the federal district court to consider his lengthy mandatory minimum sentences when calculating the sentences for his other counts and to impose concurrent one-day sentences for those counts. The judge said he would have agreed to Dean's request but understood §924(c) to preclude a sentence of 30 years plus one day. On appeal, Dean argued that the district court had erred in concluding that it could not vary from the Guidelines range based on the mandatory minimum sentences he would receive under §924(c). The Court of Appeals ruled that Dean's argument was foreclosed by Circuit precedent and that his sentence was otherwise substantively reasonable.

== Opinion of the court ==
The court issued an opinion on April 3, 2017.
