= Midland Funding, LLC v. Johnson =

- Supreme Court of the United States

Decided January 17, 2017
- Full case name: Midland Funding, LLC v. Johnson
- Docket no.: 16-348
- Citations: 581 U.S. 224 (more)

Holding
- The filing of a bankruptcy proof of claim that is obviously time-barred is not a false, deceptive, misleading, unfair, or unconscionable debt-collection practice within the meaning of the Fair Debt Collection Practices Act.

Court membership
- Chief Justice John Roberts Associate Justices Anthony Kennedy · Clarence Thomas; Ruth Bader Ginsburg · Stephen Breyer; Samuel Alito · Sonia Sotomayor; Elena Kagan

Case opinions
- Majority: Breyer
- Dissent: Sotomayor, joined by Ginsburg, Kagan
- Gorsuch took no part in the consideration or decision of the case.

Laws applied
- Fair Debt Collection Practices Act

Midland Funding, LLC v. Johnson, 581 U.S. 224 (2017), was a United States Supreme Court case in which the court held that the filing of a bankruptcy proof of claim that is obviously time-barred is not a false, deceptive, misleading, unfair, or unconscionable debt-collection practice within the meaning of the Fair Debt Collection Practices Act.

== Background ==
Midland Funding filed a proof of claim in Aleida Johnson's Chapter 13 bankruptcy case, asserting that Johnson owed Midland credit-card debt and noting that the last time any charge appeared on Johnson's account was more than 10 years before. The relevant statute of limitations under Alabama law is six years. Johnson objected to the claim, and the Bankruptcy Court disallowed it. Johnson then sued Midland, claiming that its filing a proof of claim on an obviously time-barred debt was "false," "deceptive," "misleading," "unconscionable," and "unfair" within the meaning of the Fair Debt Collection Practices Act. The federal district court held that the act did not apply and dismissed the suit. The Eleventh Circuit Court of Appeals reversed.

== Opinion of the court ==
The court issued an opinion on January 17, 2017.
