= Bank of America Corp. v. Miami =

- Supreme Court of the United States

Argued November 8, 2016 Decided May 1, 2017
- Full case name: Bank of America Corp. et al. v. City of Miami, Florida
- Docket no.: 15-1111
- Citations: 581 U.S. 189 (more)
- Argument: Oral argument

Holding
- A city can be an "aggrieved person" authorized to bring suit under the FHA, and conduct challenged under the FHA must be shown to be a proximate cause of the harm attributed to it.

Court membership
- Chief Justice John Roberts Associate Justices Anthony Kennedy · Clarence Thomas; Ruth Bader Ginsburg · Stephen Breyer; Samuel Alito · Sonia Sotomayor; Elena Kagan · Neil Gorsuch

Case opinions
- Majority: Breyer, joined by Roberts, Ginsburg, Sotomayor, Kagan
- Concur/dissent: Thomas (Title II - Dissent; Title III - Concurrence), joined by Kennedy, Alito
- Gorsuch took no part in the consideration or decision of the case.

Laws applied
- Fair Housing Act

Bank of America Corp. v. Miami, 581 U.S. 189 (2017), was a United States Supreme Court case in which the court held that a city can be an "aggrieved person" authorized to bring suit under the Fair Housing Act (FHA) and that foreseeability of harm is not sufficient to establish proximate cause between the alleged conduct and the alleged harm under the FHA.

== Background ==
The City of Miami filed suit against Bank of America and Wells Fargo (Banks), alleging violations of the Fair Housing Act (FHA or Act). The FHA prohibits, among other things, racial discrimination in connection with real-estate transactions and permits any "aggrieved person" to file a civil damages action for a violation of the Act. The City's complaints charged that the Banks intentionally targeted predatory practices at African-American and Latino neighborhoods and residents, lending to marginalized borrowers on worse terms than equally creditworthy white borrowers and inducing defaults by failing to extend refinancing and loan modifications to marginalized borrowers on fair terms. The City alleged that the Banks' discriminatory conduct led to a disproportionate number of foreclosures and vacancies in marginalized neighborhoods, which impaired the City's effort to assure racial integration, diminished the City's property-tax revenue, and increased demand for police, fire, and other municipal services. The federal district court dismissed the complaints on the grounds that (1) the harms alleged fell outside the zone of interests the FHA protects and (2) the complaints failed to show a sufficient causal connection between the City's injuries and the Banks' discriminatory conduct. The Eleventh Circuit Court of Appeals reversed.

== Opinion of the court ==
The Supreme Court issued an opinion on May 1, 2017.

The case was argued before the Court on November 8, 2016, consolidated with the companion case Wells Fargo & Co. et al. v. City of Miami, Florida (No. 15–1112). Justice Neil Gorsuch took no part in the consideration or decision of the cases, as he had joined the Court after oral argument. Justice Stephen Breyer delivered the opinion of the Court, joined by Chief Justice John Roberts and Justices Ruth Bader Ginsburg, Sonia Sotomayor, and Elena Kagan . The Court addressed two questions: whether Miami qualified as an "aggrieved person" authorized to sue under the FHA, and whether the Eleventh Circuit had applied the correct standard for proximate cause.

On the first question, the Court ruled 5–3 in Miami's favor. The majority held that the City's claimed financial injuries, lost property-tax revenue and increased municipal expenditures, fell at least arguably within the zone of interests the FHA protects, relying on prior rulings in Trafficante v. Metropolitan Life Ins. Co., Gladstone, Realtors v. Village of Bellwood, and Havens Realty Corp. v. Coleman. The majority also observed that Congress had reenacted the FHA in 1988 without materially altering the definition of "aggrieved person," effectively ratifying the Court's prior broad constructions of that term.

On the second question, the Court held that the Eleventh Circuit had erred by grounding proximate cause solely on foreseeability. The majority explained that, because the housing market is interconnected with broader economic and social life, an FHA violation could produce ripples of harm extending far beyond the defendant's conduct, and nothing in the statute indicated Congress intended to remedy wherever those ripples travel. The Court instead held that proximate cause requires some direct relation between the injury asserted and the injurious conduct alleged, and remanded to the lower courts to define and apply that standard in the first instance.

Justice Clarence Thomas filed an opinion concurring in part and dissenting in part, joined by Justices Anthony Kennedy and Samuel Alito. Thomas agreed that foreseeability alone was insufficient for proximate cause, but argued that Miami's injuries fell entirely outside the FHA's zone of interests, as nothing in the statute's text indicated Congress was concerned with decreased property values, foreclosures, or strains on municipal budgets. He further contended that even under the majority's own proximate-cause standard, the causal chain between the banks' alleged conduct and Miami's losses was too attenuated to survive dismissal.

== Subsequent developments ==
Following the Supreme Court's ruling, the Eleventh Circuit judgments were vacated and both cases were remanded for further proceedings on the proximate-cause question. The Court explicitly declined to draw the precise boundaries of proximate cause under the FHA or to determine whether Miami's specific financial injuries satisfied that standard, directing the lower courts to resolve those questions in the first instance.
