= Short swing =

A short swing rule restricts officers and insiders of a company from making short-term profits at the expense of the firm. It is part of United States federal securities law, and is a prophylactic measure intended to guard against so-called insider trading. The rule mandates that if an officer, director, or any shareholder holding more than 10% of outstanding shares of a publicly traded company makes a profit on a transaction with respect to the company's stock during a given six-month period, that officer, director, or shareholder must pay the difference back to the company. Note that the profit calculated is the maximum considering each pair of sales and purchases, a larger trade could be paired with trades up to six month prior as well as up to six months later and the correct calculation is a linear programming problem

As stated by a federal circuit court of appeals:

In order to achieve its goals [of curbing the evils of insider trading], Congress chose a relatively arbitrary rule capable of easy administration. The objective standard of Section 16(b) imposes strict liability upon substantially all transactions occurring within the statutory time period, regardless of the intent of the insider or the existence of actual speculation. This approach maximized the ability of the rule to eradicate speculative abuses by reducing difficulties in proof. Such arbitrary and sweeping coverage was deemed necessary to insure the optimum prophylactic effect.

== See also ==
- Securities and Exchange Commission (SEC)
