= Esquivel-Quintana v. Sessions =

- Supreme Court of the United States

Argued February 27, 2017 Decided May 30, 2017
- Full case name: Juan Esquivel-Quintana, Petitioner v. Jefferson B. Sessions III, Attorney General
- Docket no.: 16-54
- Citations: 581 U.S. 385 (more) 137 S. Ct. 1562; 198 L. Ed. 2d 22
- Opinion announcement: Opinion announcement

Case history
- Prior: Appeal of deportation order dismissed 26 I&N Dec. 469 (B.I.A., 2015); appeal dismissed, 810 F.3d 1019 (6th Cir. 2016); cert. granted, 137 S. Ct. 368 (2016).

Holding
- In the context of statutory rape offenses that criminalize sexual intercourse based solely on the ages of the participants, the generic federal definition of "sexual abuse of a minor" requires the age of the victim to be less than 16. Reversed and remanded.

Court membership
- Chief Justice John Roberts Associate Justices Anthony Kennedy · Clarence Thomas; Ruth Bader Ginsburg · Stephen Breyer; Samuel Alito · Sonia Sotomayor; Elena Kagan · Neil Gorsuch

Case opinion
- Majority: Thomas, joined by Roberts, Kennedy, Ginsburg, Breyer, Alito, Sotomayor, Kagan
- Gorsuch took no part in the consideration or decision of the case.

Laws applied
- Immigration and Nationality Act, 8 U.S.C. § 1101, § 1227

Esquivel-Quintana v. Sessions, 581 U.S. 385 (2017), is a case in which the Supreme Court of the United States ruled 8–0 that in the context of statutory rape offenses that criminalize sexual intercourse based solely on the ages of the participants, the generic federal definition of "sexual abuse of a minor" requires the age of the victim to be less than 16. Justice Clarence Thomas delivered the majority opinion.

== Background ==
Petitioner, a citizen of Mexico and lawful permanent resident of the United States, pleaded no contest in a California court to a statutory rape offense criminalizing "unlawful sexual intercourse with a minor who is more than three years younger than the perpetrator." For purposes of that offense, California defines "minor" as "a person under the age of 18." Based on this conviction, the Department of Homeland Security initiated removal proceedings under the Immigration and Nationality Act (INA), which makes removable "[a]ny alien who is convicted of an aggravated felony," 8 U.S.C. § 1227(a)(2)(A)(iii), including "sexual abuse of a minor," § 1101(a)(43)(A). An immigration judge ordered petitioner removed to Mexico. The Board of Immigration Appeals agreed that petitioner's crime constituted sexual abuse of a minor and dismissed his appeal. A divided Court of Appeals denied his petition for review.

== Opinion of the Court ==
The Supreme Court examined whether a conviction under a state statute criminalizing consensual sexual intercourse between a 21-year-old and a 17-year-old qualifies as sexual abuse of a minor under the INA. The Court held that it did not.

== See also ==
- List of United States Supreme Court cases
- Lists of United States Supreme Court cases by volume
- List of United States Supreme Court cases by the Roberts Court
