= 2016 term per curiam opinions of the Supreme Court of the United States =

The Supreme Court of the United States handed down nine per curiam opinions during its 2016 term, which began October 3, 2016 and concluded October 1, 2017.

Because per curiam decisions are issued from the Court as an institution, these opinions all lack the attribution of authorship or joining votes to specific justices. All justices on the Court at the time the decision was handed down are assumed to have participated and concurred unless otherwise noted.

== Court membership ==
Chief Justice: John Roberts

Associate Justices: Anthony Kennedy, Clarence Thomas, Ruth Bader Ginsburg, Stephen Breyer, Samuel Alito, Sonia Sotomayor, Elena Kagan, Neil Gorsuch (confirmed April 7, 2017)

== Bosse v. Oklahoma ==
- Full caption: Shaun Michael Bosse v. Oklahoma
- Citations: 580 U.S. 1
- Prior history: Defendant convicted, sentenced, No. CF-2010-213, Okla. Dist. Ct., McClain Cty., Dec. 18, 2012; affirmed, 360 P. 3d 1203 (Okla. Crim. App. 2015); rehearing denied, Case No. D-2012-1128, Okla. Crim. App., Dec. 1, 2015 (unpublished)
- Laws applied: U.S. Const. amend. VIII
- Full text of the opinion: official slip opinion · Oyez

580 U.S. 1
Decided October 11, 2016.
Court of Criminal Appeals of Oklahoma vacated and remanded.

The Oklahoma court erred in ruling that Payne v. Tennessee (1991) "implicitly overruled" Booth v. Maryland (1987) in regards to the victim's family members' testimony of the defendant(s) and opinion(s) of the sentence. Payne did not specifically state this, and only the Supreme Court can overrule its own precedent.

Thomas filed a concurrence, joined by Alito, writing that the Oklahoma Court of Criminal Appeals erred by ruling that Payne overruled Booth in its entirety and that the Supreme Court's decision does not affect the analytical foundations of either Booth or Payne.

== White v. Pauly ==
- Full caption: Ray White, et al. v. Daniel T. Pauly, as personal representative of the Estate of Samuel Pauly, deceased et al.
- Citations: 580 U.S. ___
- Prior history: Summary judgment denied, No. 12–1311 (D.N.M., Feb. 5, 2014); aff'd, 814 F. 3d 1060 (10th Cir. 2016)
- Laws applied: U.S. Const. amend. IV; 42 U.S.C. § 1983
- Full text of the opinion: official slip opinion · Justia

580 U.S. ___
Decided January 9, 2017.
An officer did not violate clearly established law and was entitled to qualified immunity when he arrived late at an ongoing police action, saw shots being fired by people inside a house surrounded by other officers, and fatally shot an armed occupant of the house without first giving a warning.Tenth Circuit vacated and remanded.

Ginsburg filed a concurrence.

== Rippo v. Baker ==
- Full caption: Michael Damon Rippo v. Renee Baker, Warden
- Citations: 580 U.S. ___
- Prior history: Petition denied; aff'd, 368 P. 3d 729 (Nev. 2016)
- Laws applied: U.S. Const. amend. XIV
- Full text of the opinion: official slip opinion · Rippo v. Baker

580 U.S. ___
Decided March 6, 2017.
A judge's recusal is required when, objectively speaking, the probability of actual bias on the part of the judge or decisionmaker is too high to be constitutionally tolerable. This may happen even when the judge has no actual bias. Supreme Court of Nevada vacated and remanded.

== North Carolina v. Covington ==
- Full caption: North Carolina, et al. v. Sandra Little Covington, et al.
- Citations: 581 U.S. 486
- Prior history: Judgment for plaintiffs, 316 F.R.D. 117 (M.D.N.C. 2016); stay granted, 580 U.S. ___ (2017)
- Subsequent history: recommendations of Special Master adopted, 283 F. Supp. 3d 410 (M.D.N.C. 2018); stay granted in part, 583 U.S. ___ (2018); aff'd in part, rev'd in part, 585 U.S. ___ (2018) (per curiam)
- Full text of the opinion: official slip opinion · FindLaw

581 U.S. 486
Decided June 5, 2017.
District Court for the Middle District of North Carolina remedial order vacated and remanded.

Affirmed, in part, the district court's remedy in a case alleging racial gerrymandering.

== Virginia v. LeBlanc ==
- Full caption: Virginia, et al. v. Dennis LeBlanc
- Citations: 582 U.S. 91
- Prior history: Petition granted, sub nom. LeBlanc v. Mathena, 2015 WL 4042175 (E.D. Va. July 1, 2015); aff'd, 841 F. 3d 256 (4th Cir. 2016)
- Laws applied: U.S. Const. amend. VIII; 28 U.S.C. § 2254(d)(1) (Antiterrorism and Effective Death Penalty Act of 1996
- Full text of the opinion: official slip opinion · Oyez

582 U.S. 91
Decided June 12, 2017.
Fourth Circuit reversed.

The Eighth Amendment prohibits sentencing juvenile offenders convicted of non-homicide offenses to life without parole, but the geriatric release substitute for parole in Virginia satisfies the parole requirement even though it is available only to older inmates.

Ginsburg filed an opinion concurring in the judgment.

== Jenkins v. Hutton ==
- Full caption: Charlotte Jenkins, Warden v. Percy Hutton
- Citations: 582 U.S. 280
- Prior history: Petition denied, sub nom. Hutton v. Mitchell, 2013 WL 2476333 (N.D. Ohio, June 7, 2013); rev'd, 839 F. 3d 486 (6th Cir. 2016)
- Full text of the opinion: official slip opinion · FindLaw

582 U.S. 280
Decided June 19, 2017.
Sixth Circuit reversed and remanded.

The miscarriage of justice exception that allows a habeas court to review the merits of an underlying case because of an issue with how the jury was instructed only applies if the court is shown by clear and convincing evidence that no reasonable juror would have reached the same decision as the jury actually did if the jury had received proper instructions.

== Hernandez v. Mesa ==
- Full caption: Jesus c. Hernandez, et al. v. Jesus Mesa, Jr., et al.
- Citations: 582 U.S. 548
- Prior history: Dismissed, W.D. Texas; aff'd in part, sub nom. Hernandez v. United States, 757 F. 3d 249 (5th Cir. 2014); aff'd, 785 F. 3d 117 (5th Cir. 2015) (en banc); cert. granted, 580 U.S. ___ (2016)
- Laws applied: U.S. Const. amends. IV, V
- Full text of the opinion: official slip opinion · Oyez

582 U.S. 548
Decided June 26, 2017.
Fifth Circuit vacated and remanded.

Thomas filed a dissent. Breyer filed a dissent, joined by Ginsburg. Gorsuch did not participate in the consideration or decision of the case.

== Pavan v. Smith ==
- Full caption: Marisa N. Pavan, et al. v. Nathaniel Smith
- Citations: 582 U.S. 563; 137 S. Ct. 2075; 198 L. Ed. 2d 636
- Prior history: Judgment for plaintiffs, No. 60CV-15-3153, Ark. Cir. Ct., Pulaski Cty; rev'd, 505 S.W. 3d 169 (Ark. 2016)
- Laws applied: U.S. Const. amend. XIV; Ark. Code § 20–18–401 (2014)
- Full text of the opinion: official slip opinion · Oyez

582 U.S. 563; 137 S. Ct. 2075; 198 L. Ed. 2d 636
Decided June 26, 2017.
This case concerns two lesbian couples, Leigh and Jana Jacobs and Terrah and Marisa Pavan. The Jacobses were married in Iowa in 2010, and the Pavans were married in New Hampshire in 2011. Both couples conceived children through anonymous sperm donors, and those children were both born in Arkansas in 2015. When they filled out the birth certificates, both couples listed both partners' names, but the State of Arkansas accepted only the birth mothers' names. Arkansas state law required that the birth mother's name be listed on the form, and that the husband of the birth mother be listed on the form as the father, including in cases of artificial insemination by anonymous sperm donor. Both couples sued the State of Arkansas, alleging that the birth certificate law violated the Constitution. The trial court agreed, but the Arkansas Supreme Court reversed, reasoning that the statute was about the biological relationship between a mother and a child, and thus did not violate the precedent set in Obergefell v. Hodges. The United States Supreme Court summarily reversed that decision and remanded it, stating that the reasoning of the Arkansas Supreme Court denies married gay couples the benefits that are inherent in marriage, thus violating Obergefell.

Justice Neil Gorsuch filed a dissenting opinion, which was joined by Justices Thomas and Alito. In it, he argued that this case warranted more than summary reversal, because Obergefell was solely about marriage and this statute, while tangentially related, was a different issue.

== Trump. v. International Refugee Assistance Project ==
- Full caption: Donald J. Trump, President of the United States, et al. v. International Refuge Assistance Project, et al.
- Citations: 582 U.S. 571
- Prior history: Preliminary injunction granted, International Refugee Assistance Project v. Trump, 2017 WL 1018235 (D. Md., Mar. 16, 2017); aff'd, 857 F. 3d 554 (4th Cir. 2017)
- Laws applied: U.S. Const. amend. I; Executive Order 13780 ("Protecting the Nation From Foreign Terrorist Entry Into the United States")
- Full text of the opinion: official slip opinion · Oyez

582 U.S. 571
Decided June 26, 2017.
Certiorari to the Fourth and Ninth Circuits granted; applications to stay injunctions granted in part.

Thomas filed an opinion concurring in part and dissenting in part, joined by Alito and Gorsuch.

== See also ==
- List of United States Supreme Court cases, volume 580
- List of United States Supreme Court cases, volume 581
- List of United States Supreme Court cases, volume 582
