= Disgorgement =

Legal remedy

Disgorgement is the act of giving up something on demand or by legal compulsion, for example giving up profits that were obtained illegally.

In United States regulatory law, disgorgement often refers to a civil remedy imposed by an regulatory agencies to seize illegally obtained profits. When a private party, not a regulatory agency, sues for net profits, this is known as restitution for unjust enrichment.

In Liu v. SEC (2020), the U.S. Supreme court ruled (2020) that disgorgement is simply another term for restitution, and, as such, it is subject to equitable limitations. Most relevantly, equity does not "penalize", so agencies cannot disgorge more than the net profits that resulted from their wrongdoing.

== Overview ==
Disgorgement is a remedy used in US securities law. For example, disgorgement of short-swing profits is the remedy prescribed by § 16(b) of the Securities Exchange Act of 1934.

The second edition of American Jurisprudence states that:

Disgorgement is an equitable remedy designed to deter future violations of the securities laws and to deprive defendants of the proceeds of their wrongful conduct. Indeed, in the exercise of its equity powers, the district court may order disgorgement of profits acquired through securities fraud. Disgorgement takes into account the fact that the issuance of an injunction, by itself, does not correct the consequences of past activities. This remedy may also be imposed if the court believes that a defendant should not profit from his or her wrong, but equitable considerations indicate that an injunction should not be granted.

Although not labelled "disgorgement," recovery of profits from the wrongful use of a patent or copyright belonging to another person or entity has a long history in US law. The US Supreme Court, in Sheldon v. Metro-Goldwyn Pictures Corp. (1940), stated:

Prior to the Copyright Act of 1909, there had been no statutory provision for the recovery of profits, but that recovery had been allowed in equity both in copyright and patent cases as appropriate equitable relief incident to a decree for an injunction.... That relief had been given in accordance with the principles governing equity jurisdiction, not to inflict punishment but to prevent an unjust enrichment by allowing injured complainants to claim "that which, ex aequo et bono, is theirs, and nothing beyond this."... Statutory provision for the recovery of profits in patent cases was enacted in 1870.

In Kokesh v. SEC (2017), the US Supreme Court unanimously disagreed with the view of the Security and Exchange Commission (SEC) that disgorgement in the case was remedial but held that disgorgement payments to the SEC in the case were penalties. The decision raised the questions of whether the SEC's power to order disgorgement derives only from statute, which would make congressional action necessary for the SEC to pursue disgorgement orders in federal court, and of whether the amounts awarded should be limited to actual profits gained. After Kokesh, the SEC has argued in district courts throughout the US that outside Kokesh in the statute of limitations context, disgorgement is not a penalty but an equitable remedy.

Subsequently, in Liu v. SEC (2020), the US Supreme Court affirmed that disgorgement awards could be issued as equitable remedies by the SEC but could not exceed the wrongdoer's net profits, as under 15 U.S.C. § 77u(d)(5), and that they should be funds returned to the defrauded investors.

Disgorgement is a remedy for violations of the UA Commodity Exchange Act. The purpose of such a remedy, as in securities cases, is "to deprive the wrongdoer of his or her ill-gotten gains and to deter violations of the law." However, in such cases, the court may order disgorgement only up to "the amount with interest by which a defendant profited from his or her wrongdoing."

Disgorgement payments to the SEC have for decades been considered completely equitable and compensatory and thus deductible under the Internal Revenue Code. The December 2017 tax reform law provided that to be deductible, such payments must now be identified in the relevant court order or settlement agreement as serving one of a number of specific purposes, and the appropriate government official must report to the IRS the total amount of the payment and the amount of the payment that constitutes restitution or the amount paid to come into compliance with law. The new law adds Section 6050X, which requires the government to file an IRS information return setting out any amount paid (over $600) in a suit or agreement to or at the direction of the government in relation to the violation of any law, and it must set forth any amount that is restitution or remediation.

== See also ==
- Bonus–malus
- Clawback
- Fair Fund
- Surcharge (sanction)
