= Kokesh v. SEC =

Kokesh v. Securities and Exchange Commission
- Supreme Court of the United States

Decided June 5, 2017
- Full case name: Kokesh v. SEC
- Docket no.: 16-529
- Citations: 581 U.S. 455 (more)

Holding
- Because SEC disgorgement is a punitive measure rather than a compensatory one, any claim for disgorgement in an SEC enforcement action must be commenced within five years of the date the claim accrued.

Court membership
- Chief Justice John Roberts Associate Justices Anthony Kennedy · Clarence Thomas; Ruth Bader Ginsburg · Stephen Breyer; Samuel Alito · Sonia Sotomayor; Elena Kagan · Neil Gorsuch

Case opinion
- Majority: Sotomayor, joined by unanimous

Kokesh v. Securities and Exchange Commission, 581 U.S. 455 (2017), was a United States Supreme Court case in which the court held that, because SEC disgorgement is a punitive measure rather than a compensatory one, any claim for disgorgement in an SEC enforcement action must be commenced within five years of the date the claim accrued.

== Background ==
The Securities and Exchange Commission (SEC or Commission) possesses authority to investigate violations of federal securities laws and to commence enforcement actions in federal district court if its investigations uncover evidence of wrongdoing. Initially, the commission's statutory authority in enforcement actions was limited to seeking an injunction barring future violations. Beginning in the 1970s, federal district courts, at the request of the commission, began ordering disgorgement in SEC enforcement proceedings. Although Congress has since authorized the commission to seek monetary civil penalties, the commission has continued to seek disgorgement. The Supreme Court held in Gabelli v. SEC that 28 U. S. C. §2462, which establishes a 5-year limitations period for "an action, suit or proceeding for the enforcement of any civil fine, penalty, or forfeiture," applies when the Commission seeks monetary civil penalties.

In 2009, the Commission brought an enforcement action, alleging that petitioner Charles Kokesh violated various securities laws by concealing the misappropriation of $34.9 million from four business-development companies from 1995 to 2009. The Commission sought monetary civil penalties, disgorgement, and an injunction barring Kokesh from future violations. After a jury found that Kokesh's actions violated several securities laws, the district court determined that §2462's 5-year limitations period applied to the monetary civil penalties. With respect to the $34.9 million disgorgement judgment, however, the court concluded that §2462 did not apply because disgorgement is not a "penalty" within the meaning of the statute. The Tenth Circuit Court of Appeals affirmed, holding that disgorgement was neither a penalty nor a forfeiture.

== Opinion of the court ==
The Supreme Court issued an opinion on June 5, 2017.
