= Xbox 360 launch =

Microsoft video game console launch

The Xbox 360 launch marked the release of the first high-profile seventh generation video game console. It was Microsoft's second foray in console development succeeding their 2001 launch of the original Xbox.

== Viral advertising and alternate reality games ==
The promotional campaign for the Xbox 360 began on March 30, 2005, with the opening of an alternate reality game called OurColony. Throughout March and April OurColony.net offered challenges to its community, rewarding solutions with cropped pictures of the console and game screenshots. On May 12, 2005, the ARG section of OurColony closed, visitors were instead greeted with a promotional video hosted by J. Allard. OurColony participants were allowed special access to insider info and previews before release to the general public.

OrigenXbox360.com was the next viral marketing campaign from Microsoft. Unveiled on September 27, 2005, the website, hosted by talking rabbits Boss and Didier, offers visitors an opportunity to enter in various contests. The initial contest was a raffle that required participants to answer three trivia questions regarding the Xbox 360 for a chance to attend a promotional pre-launch event. New contests include a Halo 2 tournament and a competition to design a "Gamertile" (an avatar icon). The design for the website employs flash animation of a Bonsai tree and bland elevator music to create a serene environment that is punctuated by visually intense psychedelic episodes involving the host rabbits.

October 2005 saw the launch of "Hex168" ( 168 is 360 in hexadecimal), another viral marketing campaign commissioned by Microsoft and executed by the Marden-Kane advertising agency. On October 13, 2005, members of the TeamXbox forums were directed to the Hex168.com website through mysterious messages posted by someone called "Lutz". This website hosted a number of images that appeared to perpetuate obscure conspiracy theories, but sometimes contained oblique references to Xbox 360. The campaign was later revealed to be a U.S. contest that offered participants a chance to win one of three hundred sixty Xbox 360 console bundles six days before the official launch. Winners from Hex168 were invited to attend the Xbox 360 launch party in Palmdale, CA, and given VIP access to games, food, and special areas (all free of charge).

== Announcement ==
The official unveiling of the Xbox 360 occurred on May 12, 2005, on MTV in a program called MTV Presents Xbox: The Next Generation Revealed. The special was hosted by the actor Elijah Wood and featured a musical performance by the band The Killers as well as a preview of Perfect Dark Zero, and appearances by Tony Hawk, Ryan Cabrera, and the crew of West Coast Customs who pimped an original Xbox. The Xbox 360 was also featured on the cover of TIME Magazine's May 23, 2005, issue with an article written by Lev Grossman. The cover shows Microsoft CEO Bill Gates holding up one of the units. In the article he says "It's perfect... The day Sony launches (PlayStation 3), and they walk right into Halo 3." Read more at wikiquote. Microsoft executive Robbie Bach later clarified this statement, saying "Philosophically the point Bill was trying to make is that we're not just going to ship and not have great stuff coming up." Gates himself later clarified that "Halo 3 will ship when Bungie is ready." Microsoft chose a November 2005 release date not because they wanted to be first to market but because they thought Sony would ship their PlayStation 3 at that point.

The system, along with some playable games, was shown off at E3 2005. The demos were running on "Xbox 360 Alpha Development Kits" which were Apple PowerMac G5s, chosen due to the PowerPC processor architecture that the machine shares with the Xbox 360. Microsoft claims that most of the games were running at 25–30% of full capacity because they were not running on actual systems.

== Release dates and pricing ==
Microsoft first publicized the initial prices and configurations for the Xbox 360 on August 18, 2005, at the Games Convention in Leipzig, Germany.

Date	Location	Xbox 360 System Price	Xbox 360 Core System Price
November 22, 2005	Canada; United States	CD$499.99; US$399.99	CD$399.99; US$299.99
December 2, 2005	Eurozone; Norway; Sweden; United Kingdom; Switzerland	€399.99; NOK3,395,- SEK3,995:- £279.99; CHf370.99	€299.99; NOK2,595,- SEK2,995:- £209.99; CHf350.99
December 10, 2005	Japan	JP¥39,795	JP¥29,000
February 2, 2006	Colombia; Mexico	COP$1,200,000; MXN$4999	COP$900,000; MXN$3999
February 24, 2006	South Korea	₩419,000	₩339,000
March 16, 2006	Hong Kong; Singapore; Taiwan; China	HK$?? SG$660.00; NT$13888	HK$2,340.00; SG$535.00; NT$10888
March 23, 2006	Australia; New Zealand	A$649.95; NZ$799.99	A$499.95; NZ$499.95
July 7, 2006	Chile	CLP.329.990	CLP.259.990
September 25, 2006	India	Rs.23,990	Rs.19,990
September 29, 2006	South Africa	R3699	R2699
November 3, 2006	Czech Republic; Poland	CZK11900.00; 1699.00zł	CZK8999.00; 1299.00zł
December 1, 2006	Brazil	R$1,799 (~US$899)	not released
February 10, 2007	Russia	RUB15,699 (US$640)	RUB10,999 (US$450)
April 27, 2007	United Arab Emirates	AED1,799 (US$490)	not released
February 26, 2008	Peru	S/.2249.00 (US$762)	not released

== Titles ==
Eighteen launch titles were available for customers in the United States, Canada and Puerto Rico on November 22, 2005. The European countries had fifteen titles available for the launch date of December 2, 2005. Japanese customers, however, only had seven titles to choose from by the time the Xbox 360 was released on December 10, 2005. This discrepancy is partially accounted for by the time needed to localize the games.

Title	Availability			
Title	Worldwide	Japan only	NA/EU only	NA/Japan only
Amped 3			Yes	
Call of Duty 2			Yes	
Condemned: Criminal Origins			Yes	
Every Party		Yes		
FIFA 06: Road to FIFA World Cup	Yes			
Gun			Yes	
Kameo: Elements of Power			Yes	
Madden NFL 06			Yes	
NBA 2K6			Yes	
NBA Live 06			Yes	
Need for Speed: Most Wanted	Yes			
NHL 2K6			Yes	
Perfect Dark Zero	Yes			
Peter Jackson's King Kong: The Official Game of the Movie			Yes	
Project Gotham Racing 3			Yes	
Quake 4			Yes	
Ridge Racer 6				Yes
Tetris: The Grandmaster ACE		Yes		
Tiger Woods PGA Tour 06			Yes	
Tony Hawk's American Wasteland			Yes	

In North America, the best-selling title was Call of Duty 2, which had an attach rate of 77%, followed by Madden NFL 06 and Need for Speed Most Wanted. The most successful first-party title was Perfect Dark Zero. In Japan, the most successful titles were Ridge Racer 6 (29,891 copies), Perfect Dark Zero (14,897 copies), and Need for Speed Most Wanted (6,842 copies).

== Sales by region ==
=== North America ===
Prelaunch reports assumed that Microsoft would intentionally restrict supply although there is nothing to support this and Microsoft has said they released all units into supply chains as quickly as possible. Evidence indicates that Microsoft launched with all consoles available at the time, and was operating at maximum production capability (that is, they did not withhold produced consoles). They did not, however, build up a sufficient supply of consoles to satisfy the entire demand at launch. This allowed them to launch several months earlier than would otherwise be possible but also led to shortages.

Immediately after the launch, reports about the new machine's technical glitches started coming out. Some reported the Xbox 360 crashing with errors, some reported the hard drive does not respond in certain situations while others reported error messages during various games or unusually fast overheating. Due to the issues caused by overheating of the first consoles, Microsoft extended the Xbox 360 warranty by 3 years, which cost more than 1 billion US dollars. The manual contained warnings about not placing the Xbox 360 on soft surfaces or in enclosed spaces to avoid heating problems. Microsoft claims that these problems were to be expected on a large scale release for a console and the number of reports versus the number of consoles released was minimal. Microsoft stated that they would look into the reports and offered assistance reachable by phone.

The console's initial thermal solution was insufficient for many users - long hours and/ or tightly enclosed spaces caused overheating, and over time, damage to the chips. This was clarified later on by the engineers, that it was an issue not related to peak temperature, but a repeated on/off temperature/load shift, degrading the thermal solution. The console's warranty would often send you a refurbished unit, which tended to compound the issues due to the imperfect nature of cpu/gpu chip repairs., and repeated failures were common. Third party cooling solutions became a popular offering, with some connected directly to the power cable. Eventually the heat-pads/paste were redesigned from the poorly chosen industrial solution (better for long term industrial load vs consumer electronic on/off) and the red ring became a problem only on the refurbished units - many report this was after 2007/2008.

The high demand for the Xbox 360 led to some owners almost immediately re-selling their console for vastly increased prices. eBay in particular was a popular location for such offers with thousands of consoles going up for auction, some selling for many times the original retail price. It was reported that 40,000 units appeared on eBay during the initial month of release, which would mean that 10% of the total supply was resold.

According to the NDP Group, North American sales totaled 326,000 units in November 2005. In Canada, all 32,100 units available for launch were sold. By the end of 2005, Microsoft stated it sold roughly 23,000 units. Furthermore, by the beginning of 2008, the Xbox 360 had sold 9.15 million units in the US.

Analysts believe Microsoft did not meet the original worldwide target of 2.75–3 million units sold in the first 90 days after launch, and Microsoft revised their initial 90-day estimate down to 2.5 million units, though their 6-month sales estimate remained unchanged at 4.5 to 5.5 million consoles.

The Xbox 360 was released in Mexico on February 2, 2006. Retailers such as Liverpool, Wal-Mart, Blockbuster, Sam's Club, CompuDabo, Game Planet, gdGames, and Cyberbox started to sell consoles, games, and accessories. Some department stores were selling the console at 6,000 Mexican pesos (around US$550).

=== Europe ===
Microsoft's confirmed that 300,000 units were available for the European launch. As in North America, thousands of Xbox 360 appeared on auction websites like eBay, selling for more than twice their retail price. The shortages led to some consumers criticising retailers, and others attacking Microsoft itself for failing to fill demand. In turn, some retailers blamed Microsoft for failing to provide enough consoles on the Christmas' period. Xbox 360 reached six million units sold in the region.

=== Japan ===
While other regions such as the United States or Europe enjoyed successful launches, sales in Japan have been very slow. In fact, only 103,990 units had been sold by the end of April 2, 2006.

Some believe this is mainly due to the other popular and prospective video game handheld consoles like the Game Boy Advance, Nintendo DS, and PlayStation Portable, all of which have sold far more than the Xbox 360 and all of them are Japanese originated consoles, indicating a nationalistic preference to game consoles. Others have attributed this slow start to titles such as Dead or Alive 4 and Enchant Arm missing the launch date, while others point to the marketing strategy that focused on selling the Xbox 360 as a fashionable item when customers were looking for an affordable or a high performance gaming console. It should also be noted that ToHeart2 XRATED, a highly anticipated hentai PC port of the PlayStation 2 game of the same name, was released one day prior to the Xbox 360's Japanese launch; this might also be a factor in the console's low launch sales.

For his part, Famitsu Xbox 360 editor-in-chief Munetatsu Matsui pointed to Dead or Alive 4's absence as the main factor behind the slow start. He even added information that over 60% of his readers had planned to buy the much anticipated Tecmo fighting game. The 2-day 62,135 sales figure of the Xbox 360 is a little past half of the 123,334 units of the original Xbox that Microsoft sold in the first 3 days in Japan in February 2002.

Initial predictions were highly optimistic as the highest rating launch game reviewed by Famitsu, Namco's Ridge Racer 6, scored 35 out of 40 stars. Namco expects to sell 500,000 copies of Ridge Racer 6 in Japan. This number is roughly equal to the number of Xbox units sold in Japan by November 2005. Microsoft Japan executive Yoshihiro Maruyama stated that he expects sales of Xbox 360 in Japan to hit one million units sometime next year. Maruyama is widely credited for attracting support from Japanese game developers.

To entice people into buying the Xbox 360 some retailers are offering discounts on the system if they sign up for a 2-year broadband contract, similar to cell phone deals in the US.

On the day of the launch, Capcom unveiled their Xbox 360-exclusive science fiction game Lost Planet, which features South Korean actor Lee Byung-hun in the lead role.

Since the release of Blue Dragon, the console has gained popularity. On October 19, 2006, all 10,000 Blue Dragon preorders bundled with a limited edition Xbox 360 Core system were sold-out in Japan.

=== India ===
The Xbox 360 came to India with 100,000 pre bookings.

Due to the Xbox 360 being one of the first consoles to have been officially launched in the country, it initially found tough sales. However, its sales figures have reportedly been on the rise since the launch of the PlayStation 3 in the country. Though company executives have been reluctant to divulge the numbers and sales figures, industry insiders estimate that the console manages to move about 3000 units per month, thus accounting for 12.5% of the monthly gaming hardware sales in India.

Sales picked up briefly after the launch of Halo 3 and Grand Theft Auto IV, though the launch of the latter seems to have benefited the PlayStation 3 in India more than the Xbox 360.

It is currently estimated that the console has sold about 250,000 units in the country since its launch in September 2006.

Xbox LIVE was launched in late 2006, and as with the console, initially it was greeted with lukewarm response. However, now it has become one of the console's main selling points. As of September 2009, India is the only (Officially Launched) country not having Xbox 360 Elite in its selling lineup. Although The Elite Model was launched officially in 2007 as a Limited Edition, It was quickly vanished due to the lack of movement in sales. Heavy pricing was the major reason behind this since the Elite System was priced at Rs. 34990/- (US$700)

=== Latin America ===
The Xbox 360 was released in Mexico on February 2, 2006. Retailers such as Liverpool, Walmart, Blockbuster, Sam's Club, CompuDabo, Game Planet, gdGames and Cyberbox started to sell consoles, games, and accessories. Some department stores are selling the console at 6,000 Mexican pesos (~US $550).

In Colombia, the Xbox 360 was officially released on the same date as Mexico. With a price tag of $1,200,000 Colombian pesos (~US $520), the premium package pre-order was sold out almost immediately. Retailers such as Almacenes Éxito, Panamericana, Blockbuster, Pepe Ganga, K-Tronix, Carrefour, La 14, Vivero, and Hiperbodega Alkosto have since started selling the console, games, and accessories.

On July 7, 2006, was officially released in Chile. With a price tag of $329.990 Chilean peso for the premium package and a price tag of $259.990 Chilean peso for the Core Package.

The console was also announced in Argentina in mid-2005, with "100% probability" that sales will begin in December 2006. But a year later, in May 2006, Microsoft pushed the launch date to December 2007. Still, it's very unlikely that Microsoft will actually sell their product in Argentina, considering the low sales of game consoles in the country: Sony introduced the PlayStation console in 2004 (almost 10 years after launch date in Japan), and a few months after that, the PlayStation 2, both costing twice as much as the "bootleg" imports, available in the country for years. Also, the price of the games is far from what the average gamer can afford, in the order of 100 to US$180, while PC game prices are adjusted, costing between 20 and US$60.

=== Brazil ===
After months of promotions and speculation, on December 1, 2006, Xbox 360 finally arrived in Brazil. Only the Premium package (with the games Perfect Dark Zero, Kameo: Elements of Power and Project Gotham Racing 3 included) was available, and retailed for R$ 2,999 (~US $1,500). Some of the games, like Viva Piñata, were entirely rewritten in Brazilian Portuguese since the launch of the console. Games are available at R$ 99~159 (R$ 159 for new games, and R$ 99 for the rest).

On August 31, 2007, Microsoft announced that the price of the Brazilian Xbox 360 Premium bundle price would be decreased to R$ 2,499 (~US $1,250). The price table for games remained untouched since the launch.

Halo 3 was launched at the country in the same day as the rest of world (usually the games arrive a week or a month later), with the Legendary, Collector and Standard versions, as the U.S. market. The blockbuster Halo 3 and Viva Piñata: Party Animals were also entirely rewritten in Brazilian Portuguese.

At E3 2010 Microsoft launched in 2010 the Xbox Live and the Kinect in Brazil.

On October 5, 2011, the Xbox 360 S console made in Brazil is available, and retailed for R$ 799 (4GB version) (~ US $400).

=== Hong Kong, Singapore, South Korea, and Taiwan ===
The Xbox 360 was released in South Korea on February 24, 2006.

It was released in Taiwan on March 2, 2006. Promotions included one free limited edition PGR3 faceplate bundled for the initial shipment, and a gamepad-game combo pack containing Kameo and a wireless gamepad.

The launch date for Hong Kong and Singapore was March 16, 2006, delayed from original March 2, 2006, launch date. In Hong Kong, there are promotions include: free PGR3 faceplate with purchase of selected titles, DOA4 collectibles with purchase of an extra game, and reduced price when purchased with cross-promotional items.

=== China ===
Microsoft released the Xbox 360 in mainland China around 2007. It is estimated that perhaps over 2 million Xbox are in use in China, some of them being hacked. Some are still selling in Shanghai, Shenzhen, Beijing and others.

=== Australia and New Zealand ===
The Xbox 360 was released in Australia and New Zealand on March 23, 2006, three weeks after the initially projected release date. According to GfK, a German institute specializing in market research, the Xbox 360 launch was the most successful in Australia's history at that time, selling over 30,000 consoles in the first four days. This title now goes to the Wii, which sold about 2,000 more units.

Microsoft elected not to package an Xbox Live headset with the premium system configuration; a Media Remote is included instead. In addition to the two system bundles, Microsoft released a "VIP Pack" priced at A$149.95, that contains Perfect Dark Zero, a Faceplate, Wireless Controller, promotional DVD, and membership to the Xbox 360 VIP website. Purchased separately, the price of the items would add up to A$209.85.

The Xbox 360 became the fastest-selling console in Australia, with 30,421 units sold in its first four days. The previous record was held by Sony, where the PSP was king with 27,055 units sold in the first four days. But the record was soon broken by Nintendo which sold 32,901 Wiis in the first four days since its launch on December 7.

Before the release of the Xbox 360 in New Zealand, the Xbox 360 bus toured New Zealand making 13 stops in cities around the country.

=== Philippines ===
Microsoft Philippines announced on May 8, 2006, that it will officially launch the Xbox 360 in the country. Although no details about pricing, launch games and Xbox Live were mentioned, Microsoft Philippines general manager Antonio "TJ" Javier stressed that his company intends to market Xbox 360 products and services to Filipinos.

"This is the best-selling hardware from the world's biggest software company. How can anyone not want to bring this in?", Javier stated dispelling speculation that Microsoft Philippines intentionally did not want to conduct a domestic Xbox 360 launch.

The company sells the Asian edition Xbox 360 in the country. An estimated 2,000,000 units of Xbox 360 were already sold in the Philippines since December 2005. The figure includes consoles imported from the United States, Japan and Singapore.

Lazada is currently the authorized distributor of the Xbox 360 in the Philippines, although other popular shops, like Toy Kingdom, as well as smaller store chains, are also selling units. The lone package available during launch includes the Xbox 360 Premium system with an additional wireless controller, Halo 2, and Dead or Alive 4 for 28,500 pesos ($568). This also includes a one-year replacement warranty. Now packages are also available with the Xbox 360 S, one with the console only, and the other bundled with Kinect and two popular Kinect games, Kinect Sports and Kinect Adventures.

== See also ==
- PlayStation 3 launch
- Wii launch
