= Ben Woldring =

Dutch businessman (born 1985)

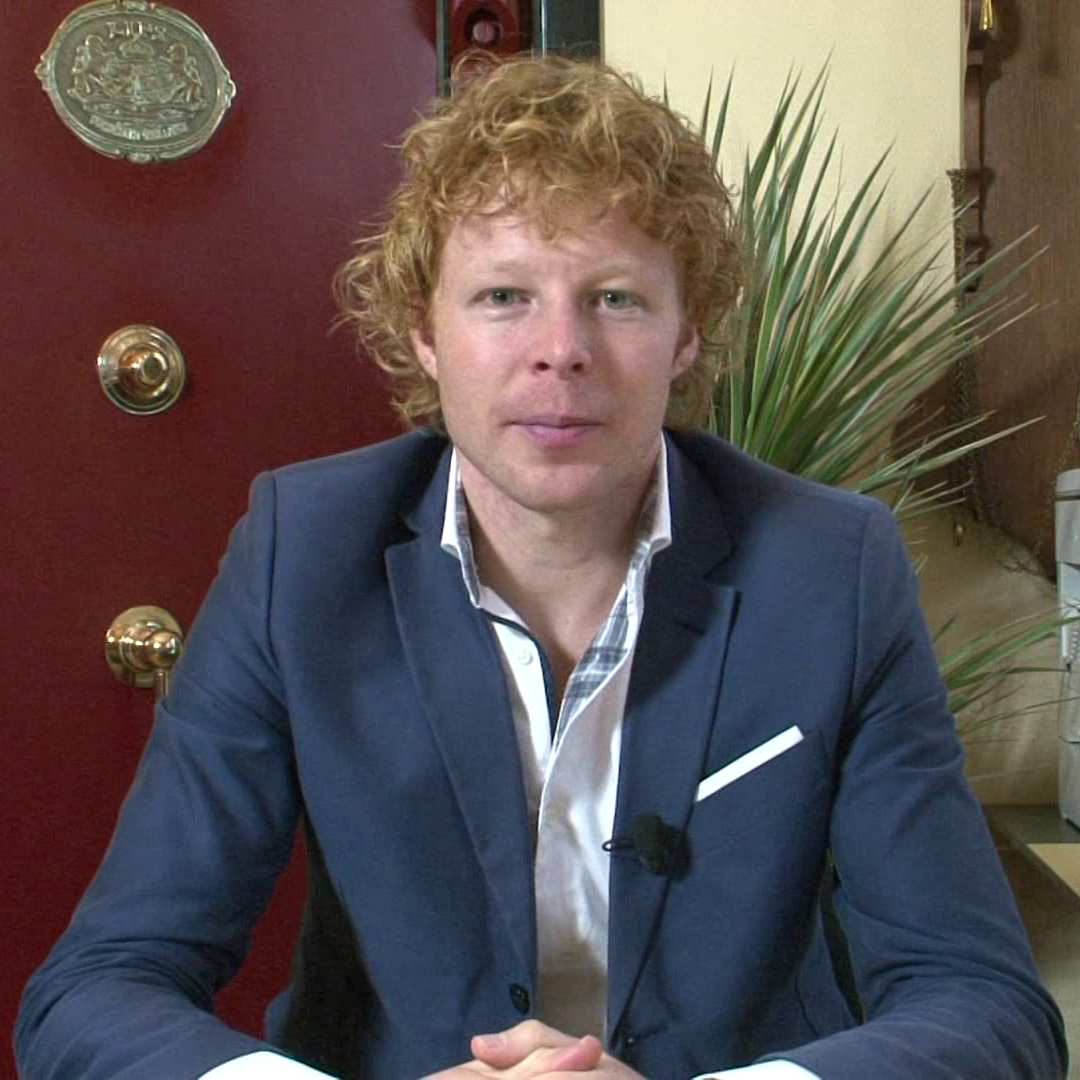
- Image of Ben Woldring
- Born: February 6, 1985 (age 41); Groningen
- Occupation: internet entrepreneur

Ben Woldring (born February 6, 1985, in Groningen ) is a Dutch internet entrepreneur and millionaire from Usquert who first rose to fame in the autumn of 1998 when, for a school assignment, he made a website where consumers could compare prices for mobile phone services. As a result, he appeared on television programmes like Kassa and the Jeugdjournaal. In 1999, the website Bellen.com registered its 100,000th visitor; a year later, Woldring started the company Bencom B.V. and hired his mother as an employee. In 2003, he won Ernst & Young's Entrepreneur of the Year Award and on November 14, 2006, he was named the best European Entrepreneur under 25 by Business Week. He is also an ambassador for the Beatrix Kinderkliniek in Groningen and the Stichting voor het Gehandicapte Kind. As of September 2009, he owns 9 price comparison websites, with the hotel comparison site LookingforBooking.com as his most recent project.

Woldring also wrote an autobiography, Ik Ben Internet-ondernemer!, published in 2000, in which he describes his life, explains his work and also gives advice.
