= Margie's Candies =

American confectionary

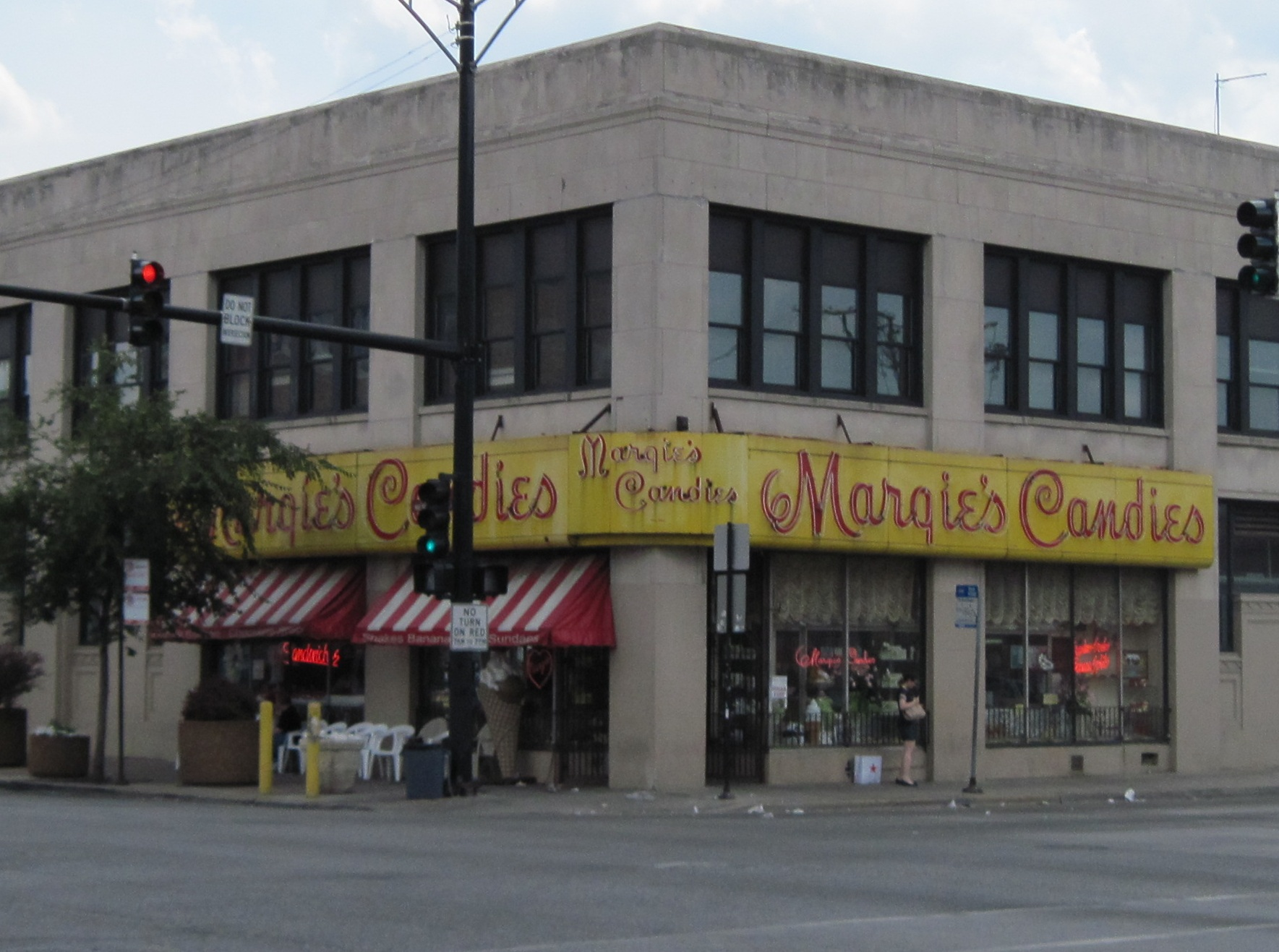
Margie's Candies on Western Avenue

Margie’s Candies is the name of two popular confectioneries on the north side of Chicago. Owned by the same family, each one is part candy store and part sit-down ice cream parlor. The older of the two establishments has been operating at the same location for over a century and is widely considered a "Chicago legend".

== History ==
=== Original Margie’s ===
The original Margie’s is located on Western Avenue in Chicago’s Bucktown neighborhood. Initially known as the Security Sweet Shop, it was founded in 1921 by a Greek immigrant named Peter George Poulos, who soon handed the business to his son George. Chicago mobster Al Capone allegedly patronized the sweet shop during its early years.

In 1933, George Poulos renamed the confectionery Margie’s Candies in honor of his wife, whom he had met at the sweet shop as a youngster. Margie herself began running the business during the 1940s while her husband was serving in the military, and she took full control in 1954 after her husband died of an ulcer. She never remarried, and for the next forty years, she regularly worked in the restaurant for about 15 hours a day, becoming a familiar sight for customers.

Margie’s cemented its place in Chicago lore in 1965 when it hosted the Beatles, who had just played a concert at Comiskey Park. According to the Poulos family, the band came into Margie’s with five girls and ordered several six-scoop "Atomic Sundaes" to share with them. The confectionery currently has a large display of Beatles memorabilia to commemorate the visit.

Margie’s gained additional attention in the early 1990s when Margie Poulos appeared in two thirty-second clips on MTV showcasing individuals with interesting occupations. These clips, which portrayed Margie as she made chocolates, were used to fill the time between commercials and music videos. Singer Liz Phair further popularized the confectionery in 1993 when she posed there for a photograph used in a Newsweek interview.

In 2005, the original Margie’s was mentioned in one of the riddles used for the OurColony Alternate reality game. The message read, "Here sweet Margie sits. At this difference it sees the rich, the poor and everything in between". Successful players realized that the riddle referred to Western Avenue, a long street which runs through many diverse neighborhoods.

=== North Center Margie’s ===
Margie Poulos died in 1995, and her son Peter assumed control of the business. In 2005, he opened a second Margie’s Candies in the North Center neighborhood of Chicago, replacing a closed Fannie May shop. This was the business’s first foray into expansion.

== Fare ==
Both confectionaries provide roughly the same menu, and though they are both called Margie’s Candies, they are arguably most popular for their homemade ice cream. Each provides over fifty varieties of sundaes, including the aforementioned Atomic Sundae, the half-gallon World’s Largest Sundae, and the twenty-five scoop Royal George (named after George Poulos). They also provide products such as banana splits, waffle cones, pie à la mode and milkshakes.

The confectionaries’ candy and chocolate line include chocolate-covered cherries, chocolate-covered nuts, cocoa, marzipan, English toffee, and fudge. In addition, they serve a small selection of standard diner fare, such as burgers, sandwiches and soups.

== Décor ==
Much of the décor at the original Margie’s has remained unchanged since the confectionery first opened, which has added to its appeal for many Chicagoans. Some of its trademark features are its multiple original Tiffany lamps, a marble soda fountain, and old-fashioned booths with miniature jukeboxes. The entire establishment is also adorned with newspaper clippings, stuffed animals, and aging photographs of past customers.

The North Center Margie’s has attempted to replicate the ambiance of its predecessor with the help of antiques and old photographs.
