= Microsoft Corp. v. Baker =

- Supreme Court of the United States

Argued March 21, 2017 Decided June 12, 2017
- Full case name: Microsoft Corporation v. Seth Baker, et al.
- Docket no.: 15-457
- Citations: 582 U.S. 23 (more) 137 S. Ct. 1702; 198 L. Ed. 2d 132
- Opinion announcement: Opinion announcement

Case history
- Prior: Baker v. Microsoft Corp., 851 F. Supp. 2d 1274 (W.D. Wash. 2012); 797 F.3d 607 (9th Cir. 2015); cert. granted, 136 S. Ct. 890 (2016).

Holding
- Federal courts of appeals lack jurisdiction to review a denial of class certification after the plaintiffs have voluntarily dismissed their claims with prejudice.

Court membership
- Chief Justice John Roberts Associate Justices Anthony Kennedy · Clarence Thomas; Ruth Bader Ginsburg · Stephen Breyer; Samuel Alito · Sonia Sotomayor; Elena Kagan · Neil Gorsuch

Case opinions
- Majority: Ginsburg, joined by Kennedy, Breyer, Sotomayor, Kagan
- Concurrence: Thomas (in judgment), joined by Roberts, Alito
- Gorsuch took no part in the consideration or decision of the case.

Laws applied
- 28 U.S.C. § 1291

Microsoft Corp. v. Baker, 582 U.S. 23 (2017), is a United States Supreme Court case holding that Federal courts of appeals lack jurisdiction to review a denial of class certification after plaintiffs have voluntarily dismissed their claims with prejudice.

On October 5, 2009, the United States District Court for the Western District of Washington refused to certify a class action lawsuit regarding scratched discs caused by Xbox 360 technical problems, and plaintiffs then settled. A new set of plaintiffs then filed a new class action bringing the same claims. After the district court again refused to certify the class action claims, plaintiffs joined Microsoft's motion to dismiss the entire lawsuit with prejudice, which U.S. District Judge Ricardo S. Martinez granted on March 27, 2012. Plaintiffs hoped this would create an appealable issue whereby they could also challenge the denied class certification.

On March 18, 2015, the United States Court of Appeals for the Ninth Circuit agreed with the plaintiffs, finding that it had jurisdiction to review and that denying class certification had been an abuse of discretion, in which Judge Johnnie B. Rawlinson was joined by Michael Daly Hawkins, and Judge Carlos Bea concurred in the result.

On March 21, 2017, oral arguments were heard before the Supreme Court, where Professor Jeffrey L. Fisher appeared for Microsoft and Peter K. Stris appeared for Baker.

On June 12, 2017, the Supreme Court delivered judgment in favor of Microsoft, voting unanimously to reverse and remand to the lower court. Justice Ruth Bader Ginsburg wrote the opinion of the Court, joined by Justices Anthony Kennedy, Stephen Breyer, Sonia Sotomayor, and Elena Kagan. Justice Clarence Thomas, joined by Chief Justice John Roberts and Justice Samuel Alito concurred only in the judgment.

== See also ==
- List of United States Supreme Court cases, volume 582
