= Xbox 360 =

Microsoft video game console

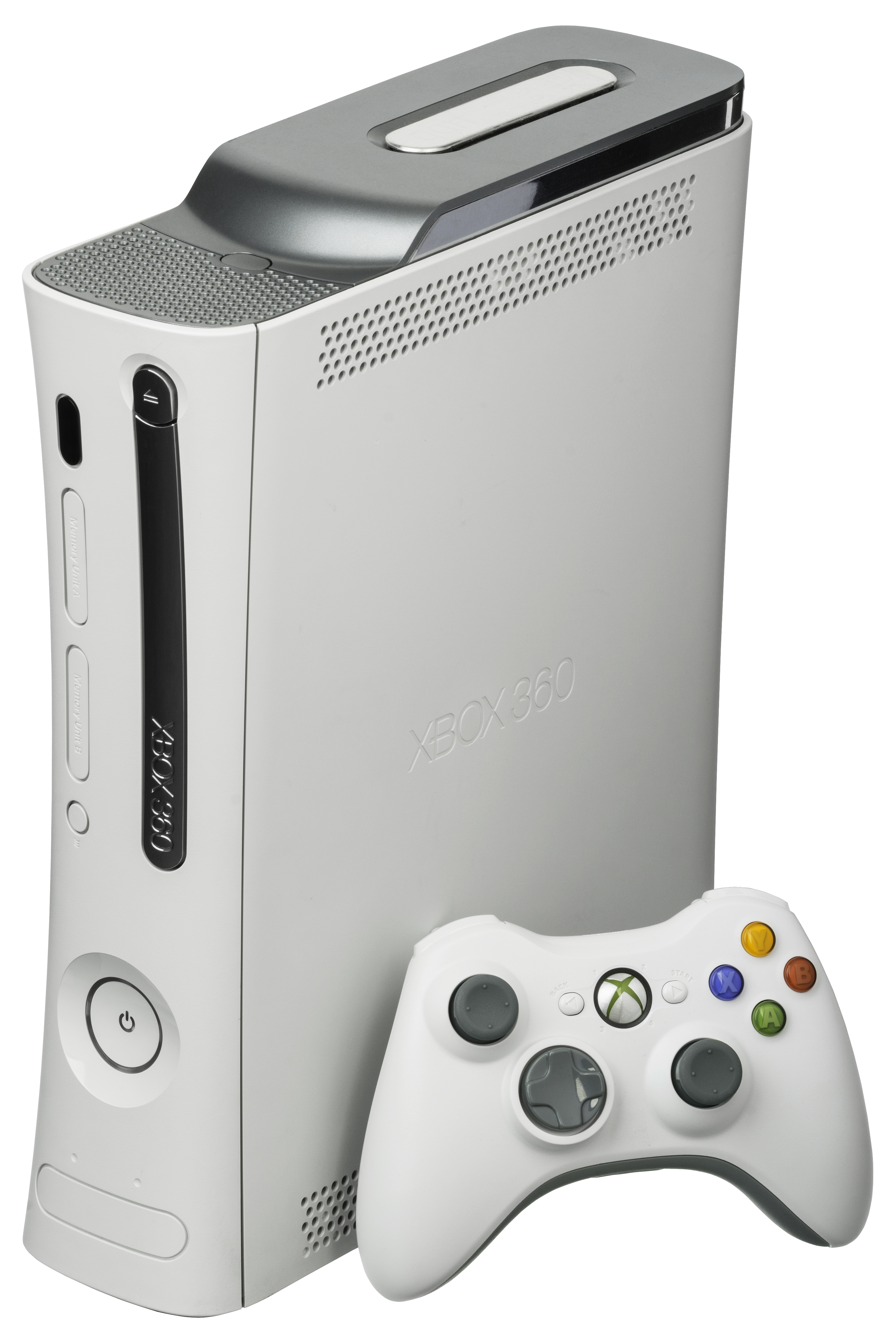
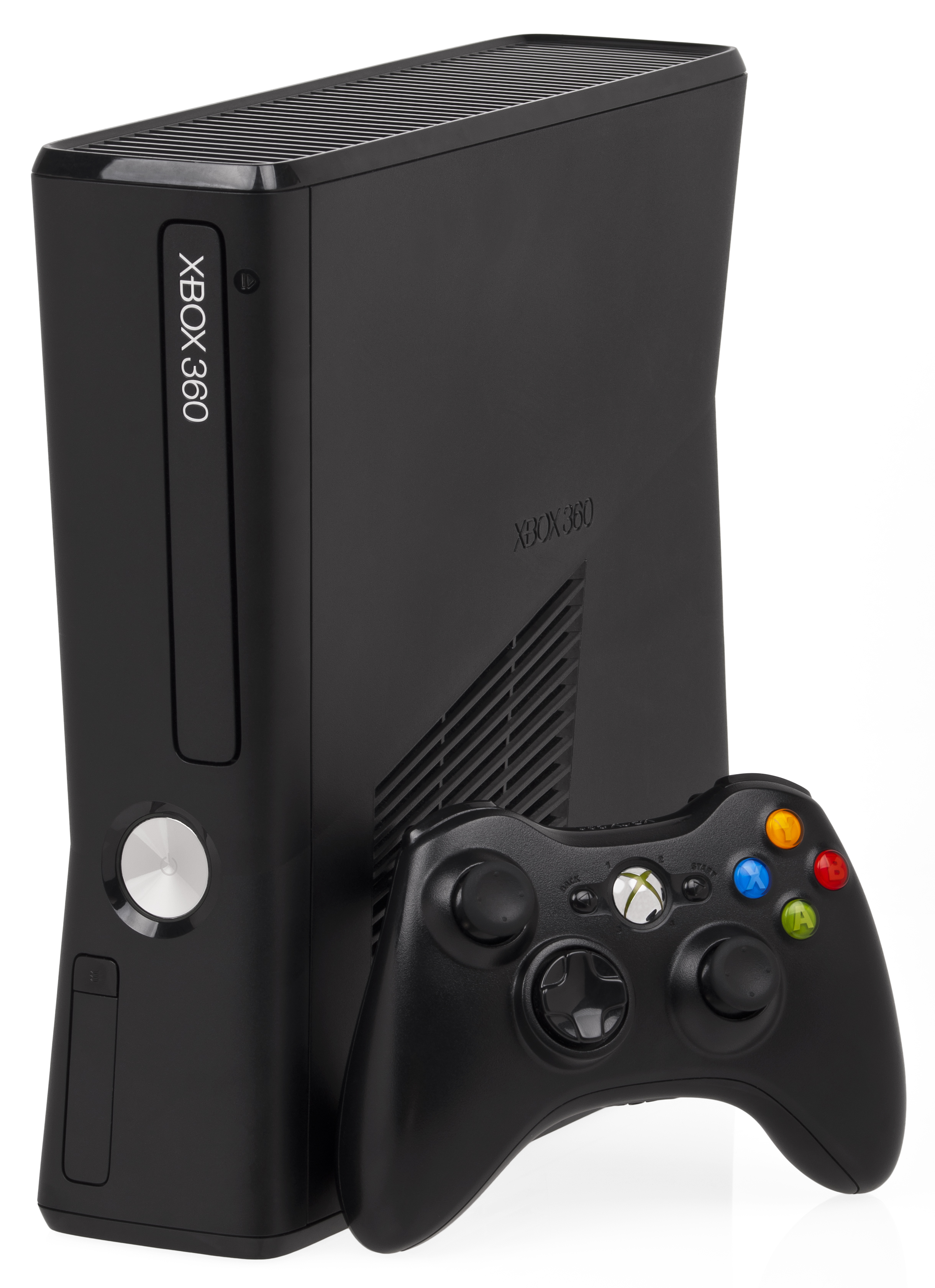
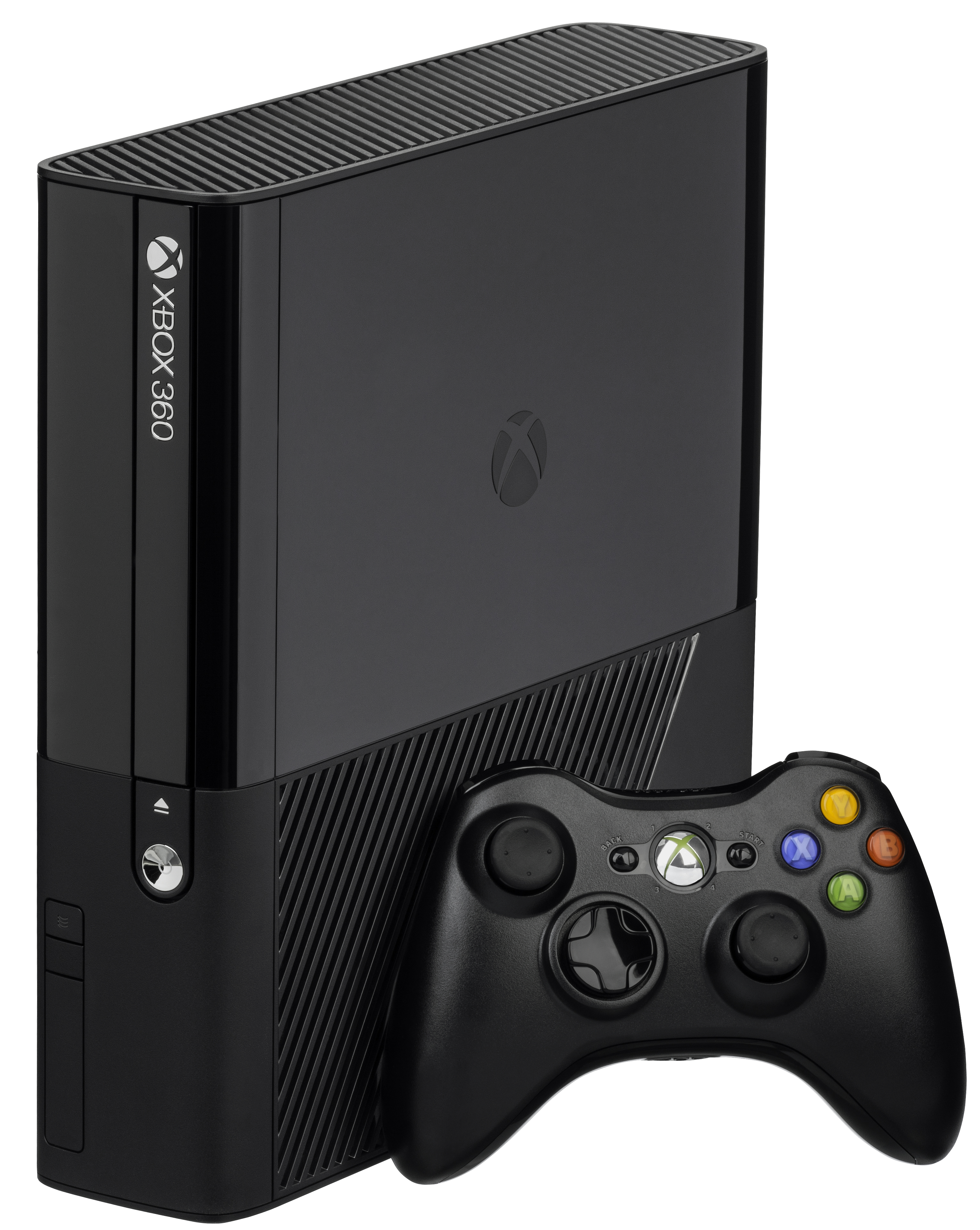
- : Left: Original Xbox 360 (2005); Center: Redesigned Xbox 360 Slim (2010); Right: Final Xbox 360 E (2013)
- Developer: Microsoft
- Manufacturer: Flextronics, Wistron, Celestica, Foxconn
- Product family: Xbox
- Type: Home video game console
- Generation: Seventh
- Released: November 22, 2005: Original Xbox 360; US/CA: November 22, 2005; EZ/NO/SE/UK/CH: December 2, 2005; JP: December 10, 2005; CO/MX: February 2, 2006; KR: February 24, 2006; HK/SG/TW: March 16, 2006; AU: March 23, 2006; CL: July 7, 2006; IN: September 25, 2006; ZA: September 29, 2006; CZ/PL: November 3, 2006; BR: December 1, 2006; RU: February 11, 2007; PE: February 25, 2008; UAE: October 28, 2008; NG/TR: 2009; SC: Spring 2010; Xbox 360 S; NA: June 18, 2010; AU: July 1, 2010; NZ: July 8, 2010; EU: July 16, 2010; Xbox 360 E; NA: June 10, 2013; EU: June 20, 2013
- Introductory price: Xbox 360 (20 GB); US$399 (equivalent to $660 in 2025); €399 (equivalent to €580 in 2023); £279 (equivalent to £490 in 2025); Xbox 360 Core; US$299 (equivalent to $490 in 2025); €299 (equivalent to €430 in 2023); £209 (equivalent to £370 in 2025)
- Discontinued: April 20, 2016
- Units sold: 84 million (as of June 9, 2014) (details)
- Media: DVD, CD, digital distribution Add-on: HD DVD (discontinued)
- Operating system: Xbox 360 system software
- System on a chip: XCGPU (Xbox 360 S and E models only)
- CPU: 3.2 GHz PowerPC Tri-Core Xenon
- Memory: 512 MB of unified GDDR3 RAM clocked at 700 MHz; 10 MB of eDRAM cache on Xenos GPU
- Storage: Storage media: Detachable hard drives 20, 60, 120 or 250 GB (older models); 250, 320, or 500 GB (Xbox 360 S models); Flash memory (later models) 256 MB, 512 MB; Budget level "Xbox 360 S" consoles: 4 GB; External USB storage device (requires system software update) 1 GB to 2 TB; Cloud storage (requires Xbox account) 2 GB
- Removable storage: Memory card (original design only); 64 MB, 256 MB, 512 MB
- Display: Video output formats: Composite video 480i, 576i (PAL); S-Video 480i, 576i (PAL); RGB SCART 480i, 576i (PAL); Component (YP_{B}P_{R}) 480i, 576i, 480p, 720p, 1080i; D-Terminal (YP_{B}P_{R}) 480i (D1), 480p (D2), 720p (D4), 1080i (D3), 1080p (D5); VGA 640×480, 848×480, 1024×768, 1280×720 (720p), 1280×768, 1280×1024, 1360×768, 1440×900, 1680×1050, 1920×1080 (1080p); HDMI (later models) 480p, 720p, 1080i, 1080p
- Graphics: 500 MHz ATI/AMD Xenos, 240 GFLOPS
- Sound: Analog stereo; Stereo LPCM (TOSLINK and HDMI); Dolby Digital 5.1 (TOSLINK and HDMI); Dolby Digital with WMA pro (TOSLINK and HDMI)
- Controller input: 4 maximum* (any combination): Xbox 360 Controller (USB wired, 2.4 GHz wireless); Xbox 360 Wireless Racing Wheel; Rhythm game controllers; Big Button Pads*; Xbox 360 Arcade sticks; Ace Combat 6 Flight Stick; Kinect; 4 Big Button Pads may be used in addition to other controllers.
- Connectivity: Original models: 2.4 GHz wireless, 3 × USB 2.0, IR receiver, 100 Mbit/s Ethernet; Add-on: Wifi 802.11 a/b/g, Wifi 802.11a/b/g/n; Revised "S" models: 2.4 GHz wireless, 5 × USB 2.0, Digital Optical audio out, IR receiver, 100 Mbit/s Ethernet, Wifi 802.11b/g/n, AUX port, HDMI port; Revised "E" models: 2.4 GHz wireless, 4 × USB 2.0, IR receiver, 100 Mbit/s Ethernet, Wifi 802.11b/g/n, AUX port, HDMI port
- Current firmware: 2.0.17559.0
- Online services: Xbox Live
- Best-selling game: Kinect Adventures!, 24 million (bundled with Kinect); Grand Theft Auto V, 22.95 million (non-Kinect game) (list)
- Backward compatibility: Selected Xbox games (requires hard drive and the latest update)
- Predecessor: Xbox
- Successor: Xbox One
- Website: xbox.com/en-US/xbox-360

The Xbox 360 is a home video game console developed by Microsoft, being the successor to the original Xbox and the second console in the Xbox series. It was officially unveiled in the program titled Xbox: The Next Generation Revealed on May 12, 2005, with detailed launch and game information announced later that month at the 2005 Electronic Entertainment Expo (E3). As a seventh-generation console, it primarily competed with Sony's PlayStation 3 and Nintendo's Wii.

The Xbox 360's online service, Xbox Live, was expanded from its previous iteration on the original Xbox and received regular updates during the console's lifetime. Available in free and subscription-based varieties, Xbox Live allows users to play games online; download games (through Xbox Live Arcade) and game demos; purchase and stream music, television programs, and films through the Xbox Music and Xbox Video portals; and access third-party content services through media streaming applications. In addition to online multimedia features, it allows users to stream media from local PCs. Several peripherals have been released, including wireless controllers, expanded hard drive storage, and the Kinect motion sensing camera. The release of these additional services and peripherals helped the Xbox brand grow from gaming-only to encompassing all multimedia, turning it into a hub for living-room computing entertainment.

Launched worldwide mostly between November 2005 and December 2006, the Xbox 360 was initially in short supply in many regions, including North America and Europe. The earliest versions of the console suffered from a high failure rate, indicated by the so-called "Red Ring of Death", necessitating an extension of the device's warranty period. Microsoft released two redesigned models of the console: the Xbox 360 S slim model in 2010, and the Xbox 360 E in 2013.

The Xbox 360 is the tenth-highest-selling home video game console in history, and the highest-selling console made by an American company and by Microsoft. Although not the best-selling console of its generation, the Xbox 360 was deemed by TechRadar to be the most influential through its emphasis on digital media distribution and multiplayer gaming on Xbox Live. The Xbox 360's successor, the Xbox One, was released on November 22, 2013. On April 20, 2016, Microsoft announced that it would end the production of new Xbox 360 hardware, although the company will continue to support the platform. On August 17, 2023, Microsoft announced that on July 29, 2024, the Xbox 360 game marketplace would stop offering new purchases and the Microsoft Movies & TV app will no longer function, though the console will still be able to download previously purchased content and enter multiplayer sessions, along with other online features.

== History ==
=== Development ===
Known during development as Xbox Next, Xenon, Xbox 2, Xbox FS or NextBox, the Xbox 360 was conceived in early 2003. In February 2003, planning for the Xenon software platform began, and was headed by Microsoft's Vice President J Allard. That month, Microsoft held an event for 400 developers in Bellevue, Washington to recruit support for the system. Also that month, Peter Moore, former president of Sega of America, joined Microsoft. On August 12, 2003, ATI signed on to produce the graphics processing unit for the new console, a deal that was publicly announced two days later. Before the launch of the Xbox 360, several Alpha development kits were spotted using Apple's Power Mac G5 hardware. This was because the system's PowerPC 970 processor was running the same PowerPC architecture that the Xbox 360 would eventually run under IBM's Xenon processor. The cores of the Xenon processor were developed using a slightly modified version of the PlayStation 3's Cell Processor PPE architecture. According to David Shippy and Mickie Phipps, the IBM employees were "hiding" their work from Sony and Toshiba, IBM's partners in developing the Cell Processor. Jeff Minter created the music visualization program Neon which is included with the Xbox 360.

=== Launch ===
The Xbox 360 was released on November 22, 2005, in the United States and Canada; December 2, 2005, in Europe and December 10, 2005, in Japan. It was later launched in Mexico, Brazil, Chile, Colombia, Hong Kong, Singapore, South Korea, Taiwan, Australia, New Zealand, South Africa, India, and Russia. In its first year in the market, the system was launched in 36 countries, more countries than any other console has launched in a single year.

=== Critical reception ===
In 2009, IGN named the Xbox 360 the sixth-greatest video game console of all time, out of a field of 25. Although not the best-selling console of the seventh generation, the Xbox 360 was deemed by TechRadar to be the most influential, by emphasizing digital media distribution and online gaming through Xbox Live, and by popularizing game achievement awards. PC Magazine considered the Xbox 360 the prototype for online gaming as it "proved that online gaming communities could thrive in the console space". Five years after the Xbox 360's debut, the well-received Kinect motion capture camera was released, which set the record of being the fastest selling consumer electronic device in history, and extended the life of the console. Edge ranked Xbox 360 the second-best console of the 1993–2013 period, stating "It had its own social network, cross-game chat, new indie games every week, and the best version of just about every multiformat game ... Killzone is no Halo and nowadays Gran Turismo is no Forza, but it's not about the exclusives—there's nothing to trump Naughty Dog's PS3 output, after all. Rather, it's about the choices Microsoft made back in the original Xbox's lifetime. The PC-like architecture meant the early EA Sports games ran at 60fps compared to only 30 on PS3, Xbox Live meant every dedicated player had an existing friends list, and Halo meant Microsoft had the killer next-generation exclusive. And when developers demo games on PC now they do it with a 360 pad—another industry benchmark, and a critical one."

=== Sales ===
| Region | Units sold | First available |
|---|---|---|
| United States | 42.7 million (lifetime sales) | November 22, 2005 |
| EMEA region (Europe, Middle East and Africa) | 13.7 million as of March 31, 2011 (includes UK sales) | December 2, 2005 |
| United Kingdom | 9 million (lifetime sales) | December 2, 2005 |
| Japan | 1.62 million (lifetime sales) | December 10, 2005 |
| Australia & New Zealand | 1 million as of April 19, 2010 | March 23, 2006 |
| Worldwide | 84 million as of June 9, 2014 | (more...) |

The Xbox 360 began production only 69 days before launch, on September 14, 2005, and Microsoft was not able to supply enough systems to meet initial consumer demand in Europe or North America, selling out completely upon release in all regions except in Japan. Forty thousand units were offered for sale on auction site eBay during the initial week of release, 10% of the total supply. By year's end, Microsoft had shipped 1.5 million units, including 900,000 in North America, 500,000 in Europe, and 100,000 in Japan.

In May 2008, Microsoft announced that 10 million Xbox 360s had been sold and that it was the "first current generation gaming console" to surpass the 10 million figure in the US. In the US, the Xbox 360 was the leader in current-generation home console sales until June 2008, when it was surpassed by the Wii. By the end of March 2011, Xbox 360 sales in the US had reached 25.4 million units. Between January 2011 and October 2013, the Xbox 360 was the best-selling console in the United States for these 32 consecutive months. By the end of 2014, Xbox 360 sales had surpassed sales of the Wii, making the Xbox 360 the best-selling 7th-generation console in the US once again. In Canada, the Xbox 360 has sold a total of 870,000 units as of August 1, 2008. According to data from Circana, lifetime Xbox 360 sales in the United States reached 42.7 million units.

In Europe, the Xbox 360 has sold seven million units as of November 20, 2008. The Xbox 360 took 110 weeks to reach 2 million units sold in the UK, generating £507m in revenue. Sales in the United Kingdom would reach 3.2 million units by January 2009, per GfK Chart-Track. The 8 million unit mark was crossed in the UK by February 2013. Sales of the Xbox 360 would overtake the Wii later that year, topping 9 million units, making the Xbox 360 the best-selling 7th-generation console in the UK, as well as making it the third best-selling console of all time in the region, behind the PS2 and Nintendo DS. Over 1 million units were sold in Spain across the console's lifecycle.

The Xbox 360 crossed the 1 million units sold in Japan in March 2009, and the 1.5 million units sold in June 2011. Lifetime sales of the Xbox 360 in Japan stand at 1,616,218 million units. While the Xbox 360 has sold poorly in Japan, it improved upon the sales of the original Xbox, which had total sales of 474,992 units. Furthermore, the Xbox 360 managed to outsell both the PlayStation 3 and Wii the week ending September 14, 2008, as well as the week ending February 22, 2009, when the Japanese Xbox 360 exclusives Infinite Undiscovery and Star Ocean: The Last Hope, were released those weeks, respectively. Ultimately, Edge magazine would report that Microsoft had been unable to make serious inroads into the dominance of domestic rivals Sony and Nintendo; adding that lackluster sales in Japan had led to retailers scaling down and in some cases, discontinuing sales of the Xbox 360 completely. The significance of Japan's poor sales might be overstated in the media in comparison to overall international sales.

=== Legacy ===
The Xbox 360 sold much better than its predecessor, and although not the best-selling console of the seventh generation, it is regarded as a success since it strengthened Microsoft as a major force in the console market at the expense of well-established rivals. The inexpensive Wii did sell the most console units but eventually saw a collapse of third-party software support in its later years, and it has been viewed by some as a fad since the succeeding Wii U had a poor debut in 2012. The PlayStation 3 struggled for a time due to being too expensive and initially lacking quality games, making it far less dominant than its predecessor, the PlayStation 2, and it took until late in the PlayStation 3's lifespan for its sales and games to reach parity with the Xbox 360. TechRadar proclaimed that "Xbox 360 passes the baton as the king of the hill – a position that puts all the more pressure on its successor, Xbox One".

The Xbox 360's advantage over its competitors was due to the release of high-profile games from both first party and third-party developers. The 2007 Game Critics Awards honored the platform with 38 nominations and 12 wins – more than any other platform. By March 2008, the Xbox 360 had reached a software attach rate of 7.5 games per console in the US; the rate was 7.0 in Europe, while its competitors were 3.8 (PS3) and 3.5 (Wii), according to Microsoft. At the 2008 Game Developers Conference, Microsoft announced that it expected over 1,000 games available for Xbox 360 by the end of the year. As well as enjoying exclusives such as additions to the Halo franchise and Gears of War, the Xbox 360 has managed to gain a simultaneous release of games that were initially planned to be PS3 exclusives, including Devil May Cry 4, Ace Combat 6, Virtua Fighter 5, Grand Theft Auto IV, Final Fantasy XIII, Tekken 6, Metal Gear Rising: Revengeance, and L.A. Noire. In addition, Xbox 360 versions of cross-platform games were generally considered superior to their PS3 counterparts in 2006 and 2007, due in part to the difficulties of programming for the PS3.

TechRadar deemed the Xbox 360 as the most influential game system through its emphasis of digital media distribution, Xbox Live online gaming service, and game achievement feature. During the console's lifetime, the Xbox brand has grown from gaming-only to encompassing all multimedia, turning it into a hub for "living-room computing environment".

Microsoft announced the successor to the Xbox 360, the Xbox One, on May 21, 2013. On April 20, 2016, Microsoft announced the end of production of new Xbox 360 hardware, though the company will continue to provide hardware and software support for the platform as selected Xbox 360 games are playable on Xbox One. The Xbox 360 maintained an unusually long commercial lifespan, receiving continued software support from major publishers and new title releases as late as 2018, nearly five years after the launch of its successor, the Xbox One. The Xbox 360 continues to have an active player base years after the system's discontinuation. Speaking to Engadget at E3 2019 after the announcement of Project Scarlett, the next-generation of Xbox consoles after the Xbox One, Phil Spencer stated that there were still "millions and millions of players" active on the Xbox 360. After the launch of the Xbox Series X and S by the end of 2020, the Xbox 360 still had a 17.7% market share of all consoles in use in Mexico; comparatively, newer systems like the Xbox One and PlayStation 4 stood at 36.9% and 18.0% market share, respectively.

== Hardware ==
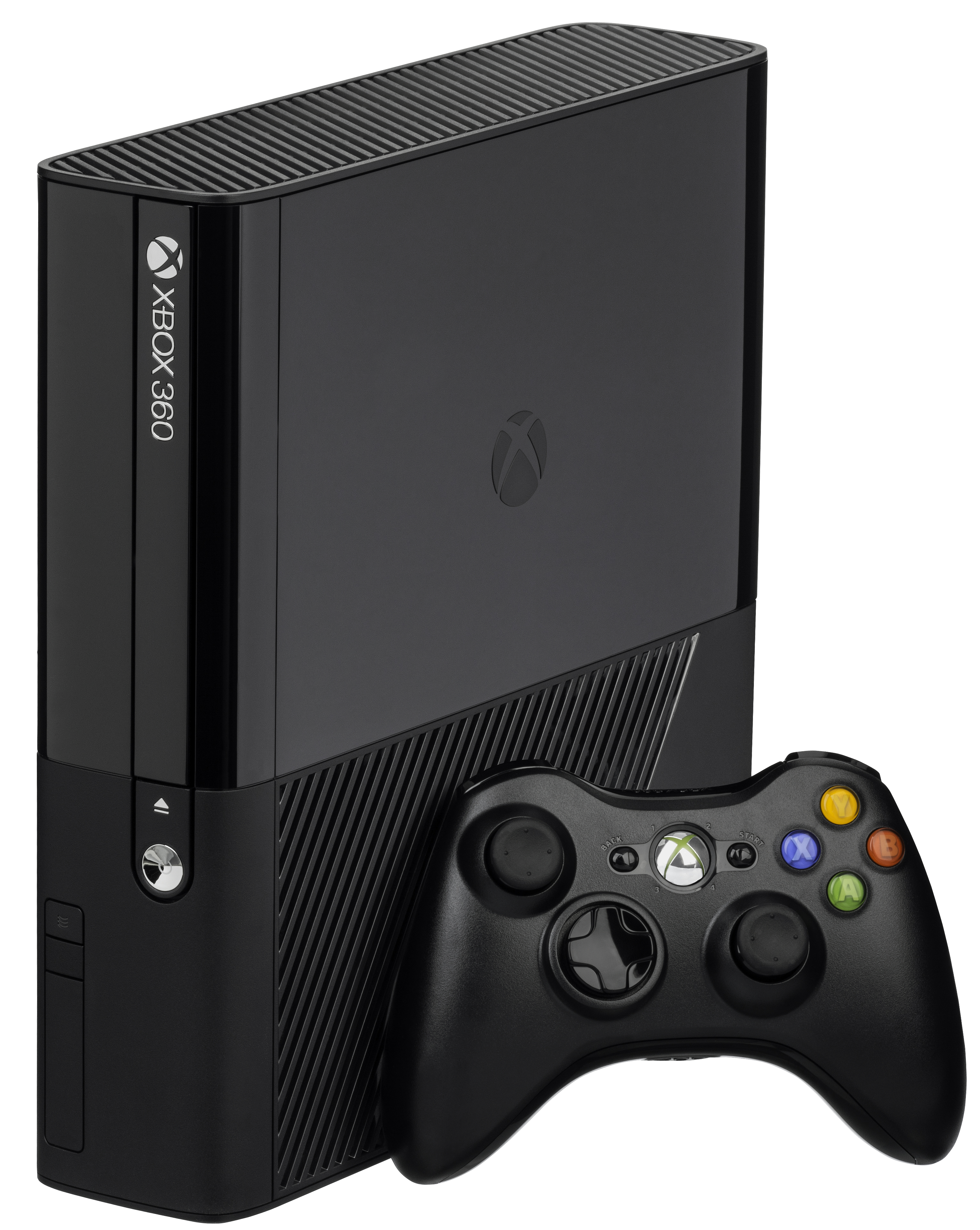
The Xbox 360 E model, announced at E3 2013, shares many aesthetics with the Xbox One.

The main unit of the Xbox 360 itself has slight double concavity in matte white or black. The official color of the white model is Arctic Chill. It features a port on the top when vertical (left side when horizontal) to which a custom-housed hard disk drive unit can be attached.

On the Slim and E models, the hard drive bay is on the bottom when vertical (right side when horizontal) and requires the opening of a concealed door to access it. (This does not void the warranty.) The Xbox 360 Slim/E hard drives are standard 2.5" SATA laptop drives, but have a custom enclosure and firmware so that the Xbox 360 can recognize it.

=== Technical specifications ===
The Xbox 360 uses the triple-core IBM designed Xenon as its CPU, with each core capable of simultaneously processing two threads, and can therefore operate on up to six threads at once. Graphics processing is handled by the ATI Xenos, which has 10 MB of eDRAM. Its main memory pool is 512 MB in size.

Originally, the Xbox 360 was equipped with only 256 MB of RAM, but Epic, the Gears of War developer, demonstrated to Microsoft that the console should have 512 MB of RAM to deliver much better performance. When asked about this, Epic Games Executive Vice President Mark Rein said in 2006: "So the day they made the decision, we were apparently the first developer they called; we were at Game Developers Conference, was it two years ago, and then I got a call from the chief financial officer of MGS and he said 'I just want you to know you cost me a billion dollars' and I said, 'we did a favour for a billion gamers'."

Various hard disk drives have been produced, including options at 20, 60, 120, 250, 320, or 500 GB.

=== Accessories ===
Many accessories are available for the console, including both wired and wireless controllers, faceplates for customization, headsets for chatting, a webcam for video chatting, dance mats and Gamercize for exercise, three sizes of memory units and six sizes of hard drives (20, 60, 120, 250 (initially Japan only, but later also available elsewhere), 320, and 500 GB), among other items, all of which are styled to match the console.

In 2006, Microsoft released the Xbox 360 HD DVD Player. The accessory was discontinued in 2008 after the format war had ended in Blu-ray's favor.

==== Kinect ====
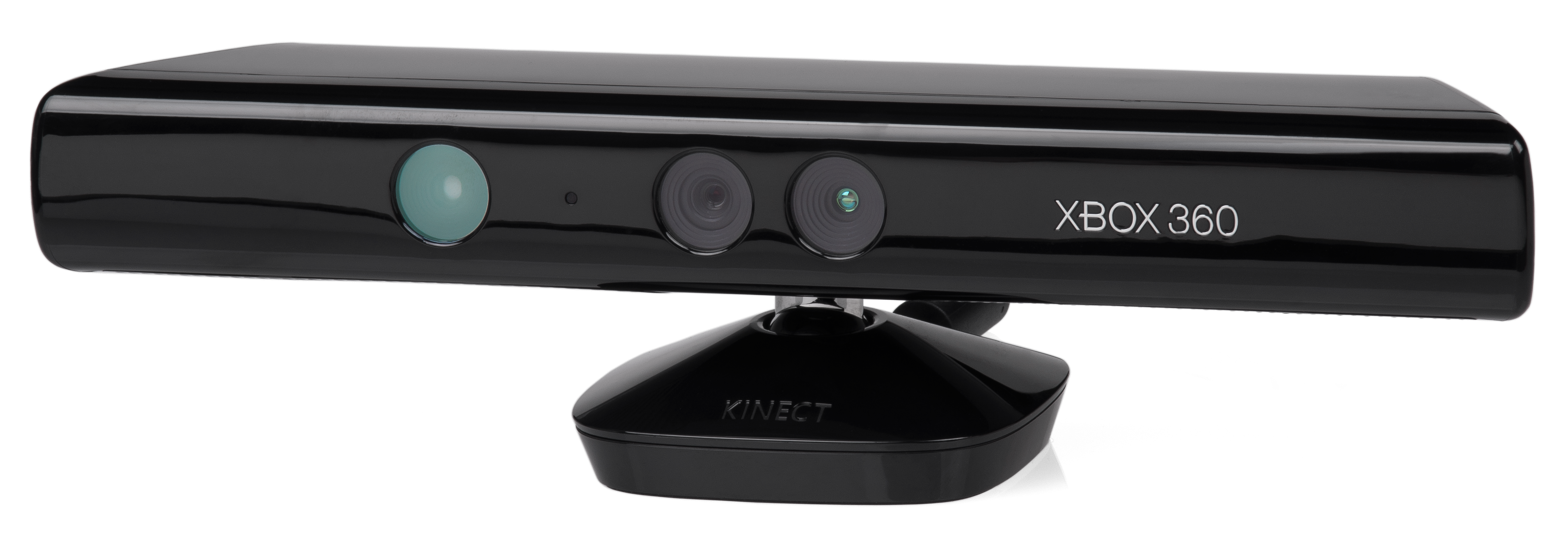
A Kinect sensor device. The Xbox 360 E revision has an additional Xbox logo to the left of the Xbox 360 branding.

Kinect is a "controller-free gaming and entertainment experience" for the Xbox 360. It was first announced on June 1, 2009, at the Electronic Entertainment Expo, under the codename, Project Natal. The add-on peripheral enables users to control and interact with the Xbox 360 without a game controller by using gestures, spoken commands and presented objects and images. The Kinect accessory is compatible with all Xbox 360 models, connecting to new models via a custom connector, and to older ones via a USB and mains power adapter. During their CES 2010 keynote speech, Robbie Bach and Microsoft CEO Steve Ballmer went on to say that Kinect would be released during the holiday period (November–January) and work with every Xbox 360 console. It was released on November 4, 2010.

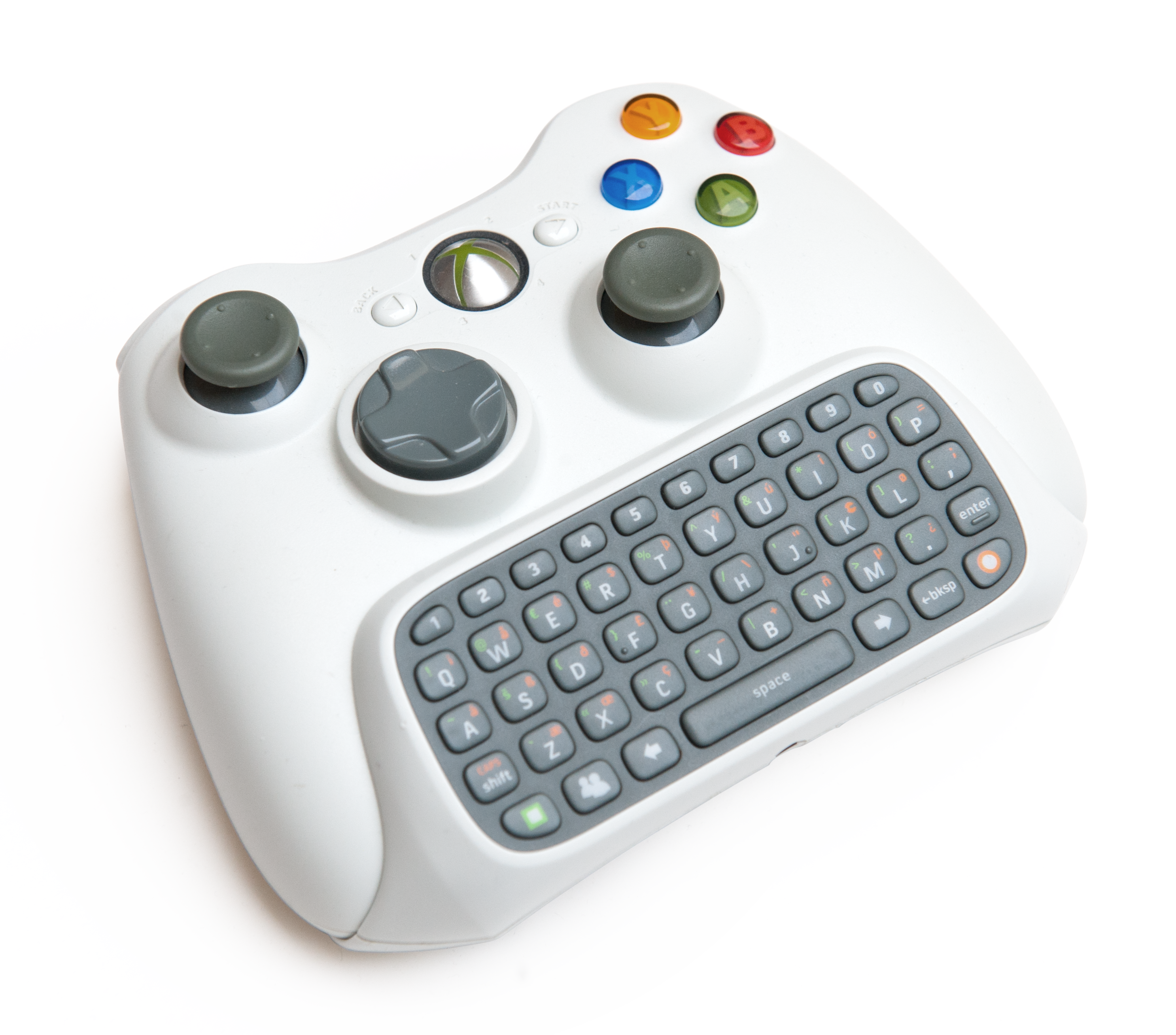
Xbox 360 Chatpad from the Messenger Kit attached to a wireless controller

=== AV output ===
Built-in

- HDMI (only made after 2007)
- S/PDIF (only Slim)
- Stereo Audio, Composite Video – Jack 3.5 mm (only Slim E)

Through AV connector

- Composite Video
- S-Video
- SCART RGB
- VGA
- YP_{B}P_{R}
- D-Terminal
- S/PDIF
- RCA – stereo audio

=== Retail configurations ===
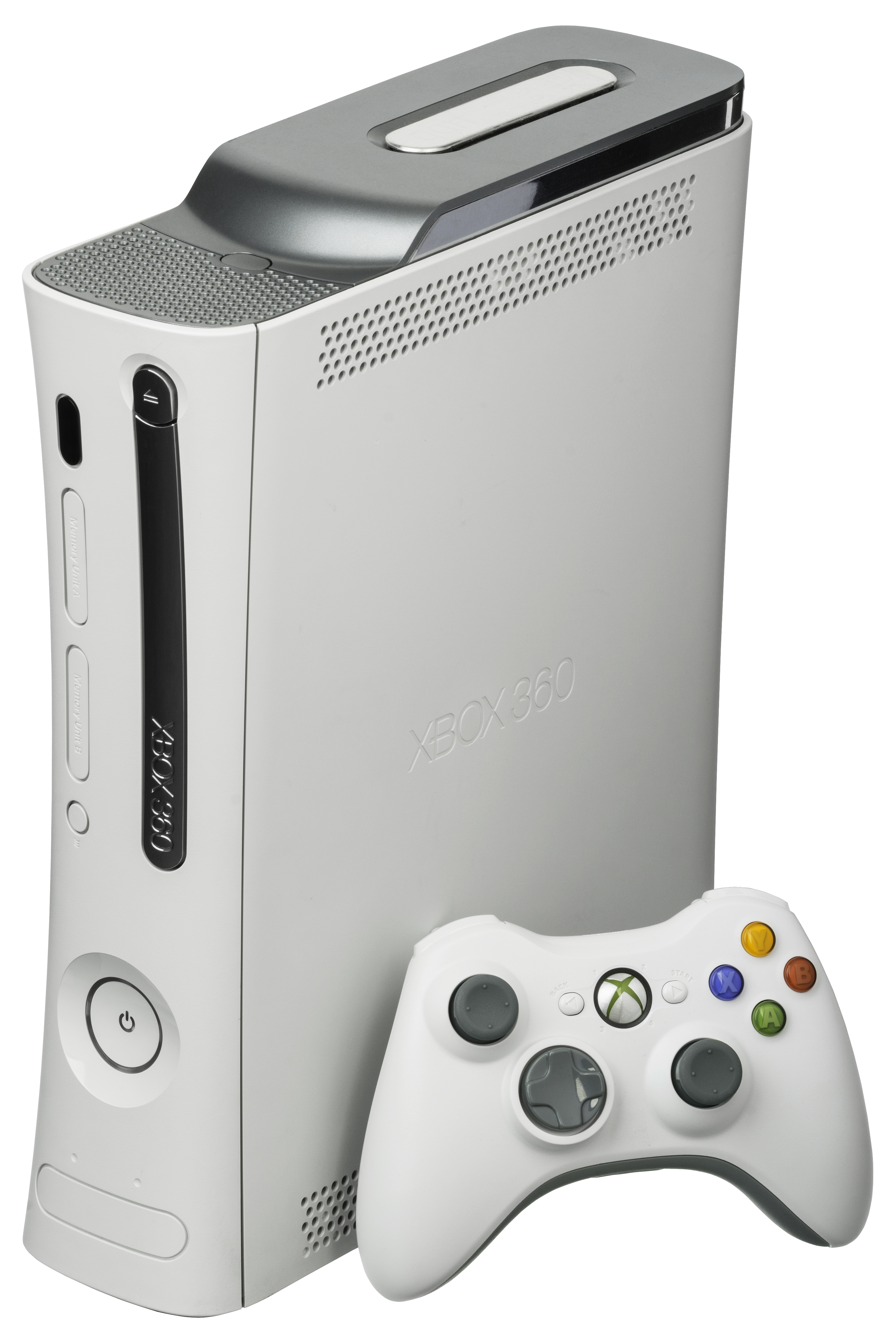
Xbox 360 Premium

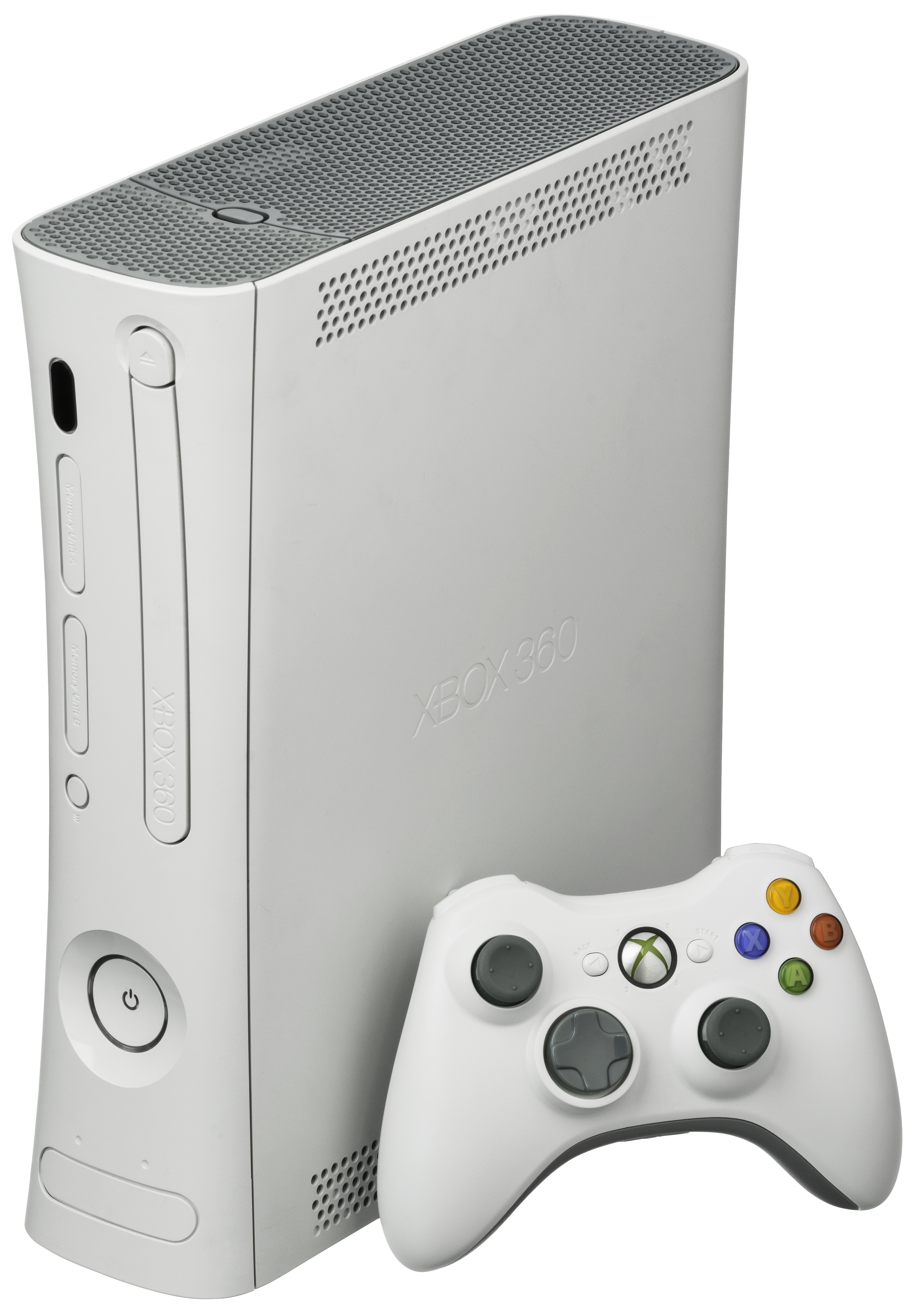
Xbox 360 Arcade (replaced Xbox 360 Core)

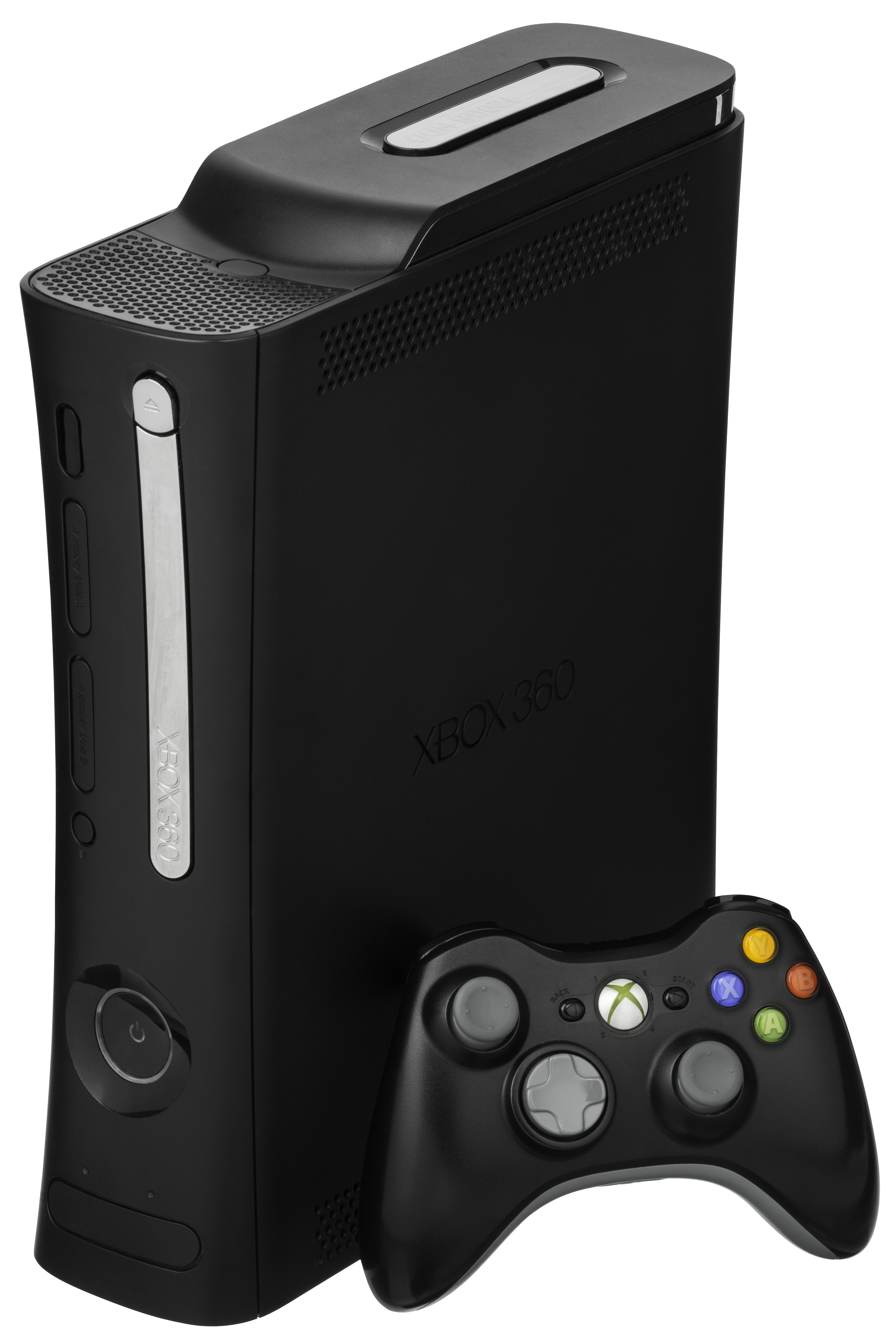
Xbox 360 Elite

At launch, the Xbox 360 was available in two configurations: the "Xbox 360" package (unofficially known as the 20 GB Pro or Premium), priced at US$399 or £279.99, and the entry-level "Xbox 360 Core", priced at US$299 and £209.99. The original shipment of the Xbox 360 version included a cut-down version of the Media Remote as a promotion. The Elite package was launched later with a built-in HDMI port at US$479. The "Xbox 360 Core" was replaced by the "Xbox 360 Arcade" in October 2007 and a 60 GB version of the Xbox 360 Pro was released on August 1, 2008. The Pro package was discontinued and marked down to US$249 on August 28, 2009, to be sold until stock ran out, while the Elite was also marked down in price to US$299.

Two major hardware revisions of the Xbox 360 have succeeded the original models; the Xbox 360 S (also referred to as the "Slim") replaced the original "Elite" and "Arcade" models in 2010. The S model carries a smaller, streamlined appearance with an angular case, and utilizes a redesigned motherboard designed to alleviate the hardware and overheating issues experienced by prior models. It also includes a proprietary port for use with the Kinect sensor. The Xbox 360 E, a further streamlined variation of the 360 S with a two-tone rectangular case inspired by Xbox One, was released in 2013. In addition to its revised aesthetics, the Xbox 360 E also has one fewer USB port and no longer supports S/PDIF.

==== United States ====
November 22, 2005

- Launch of Xbox 360 Premium (20 GB) – $399.99
- Launch of Xbox 360 Core – $299.99

April 29, 2007

- Launch Xbox 360 Elite (120 GB) – $479.99

August 6, 2007

- Price cut on Xbox 360 Premium (20 GB) – $349.99
- Price cut on Xbox 360 Core – $279.99
- Price cut on Xbox 360 Elite – $449.99

October 27, 2007

- Launch of Xbox 360 Arcade – $279.99
- Discontinuation of Xbox 360 Core

July 13, 2008

- Discontinuation of Xbox 360 (20 GB) (price cut to $299.99 for remaining stock)

August 1, 2008

- Launch of Xbox 360 Premium (60 GB) – $349.99

September 5, 2008

- Price cut on Xbox 360 Elite – $399.99
- Price cut on Xbox 360 (60 GB) – $299.99
- Price cut on Xbox 360 Arcade – $199.99

August 28, 2009

- Discontinuation of Xbox 360 (60 GB) (price cut to $249.99 for remaining stock)
- Price cut on Xbox 360 Elite – $299.99

June 19, 2010

- Launch of Xbox 360 S 250 GB – $299.99
- Discontinuation of Xbox 360 Elite (price cut to $249.99 for remaining stock)
- Discontinuation of Xbox 360 Arcade (price cut to $149.99 for remaining stock)

August 3, 2010

- Launch of Xbox 360 S 4 GB – $199.99

June 10, 2013

- Launch of Xbox 360 E 4 GB – $199.99
- Launch of Xbox 360 E 250 GB – $299.99

April 20, 2016

- Discontinuation of all Xbox 360 models.

=== Technical problems ===
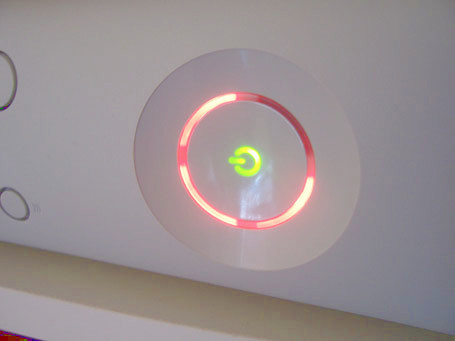
Three red lights on the Xbox 360's ring indicator representing a "General Error requiring service of the Console or Power Adapter", commonly nicknamed the "Red Ring of Death"

The original model of the Xbox 360 has been subject to a number of technical problems. Since the console's release in 2005, users have reported concerns over its reliability and failure rate.

To aid customers with defective consoles, Microsoft extended the Xbox 360's manufacturer's warranty to three years for hardware failure problems that generate a "General Hardware Failure" error report. A "General Hardware Failure" is recognized on all models released before the Xbox 360 S by three quadrants of the ring around the power button flashing red. This error is often known as the "Red Ring of Death". In April 2009, the warranty was extended to also cover failures related to the E74 error code. The warranty extension is not granted for any other types of failures that do not generate these specific error codes.

After these problems surfaced, Microsoft attempted to modify the console to improve its reliability. Modifications included a reduction in the number, size, and placement of components, the addition of dabs of epoxy on the corners and edges of the CPU and GPU as glue to prevent movement relative to the board during heat expansion, and a second GPU heatsink to dissipate more heat. With the release of the redesigned Xbox 360 S, the warranty for the newer models does not include the three-year extended coverage for "General Hardware Failures". The newer Xbox 360 S and E models indicate system overheating when the console's power button begins to flash red, unlike previous models where the first and third quadrant of the ring would light up red around the power button if overheating occurred. The system will then warn the user of imminent system shutdown until the system has cooled, whereas a flashing power button that alternates between green and red is an indication of a "General Hardware Failure" unlike older models where three of the quadrants would light up red. Motherboards primarily suffering from the red ring of death are Xenon, Zephyr, and earlier Falcons.

== Software ==
=== Games ===
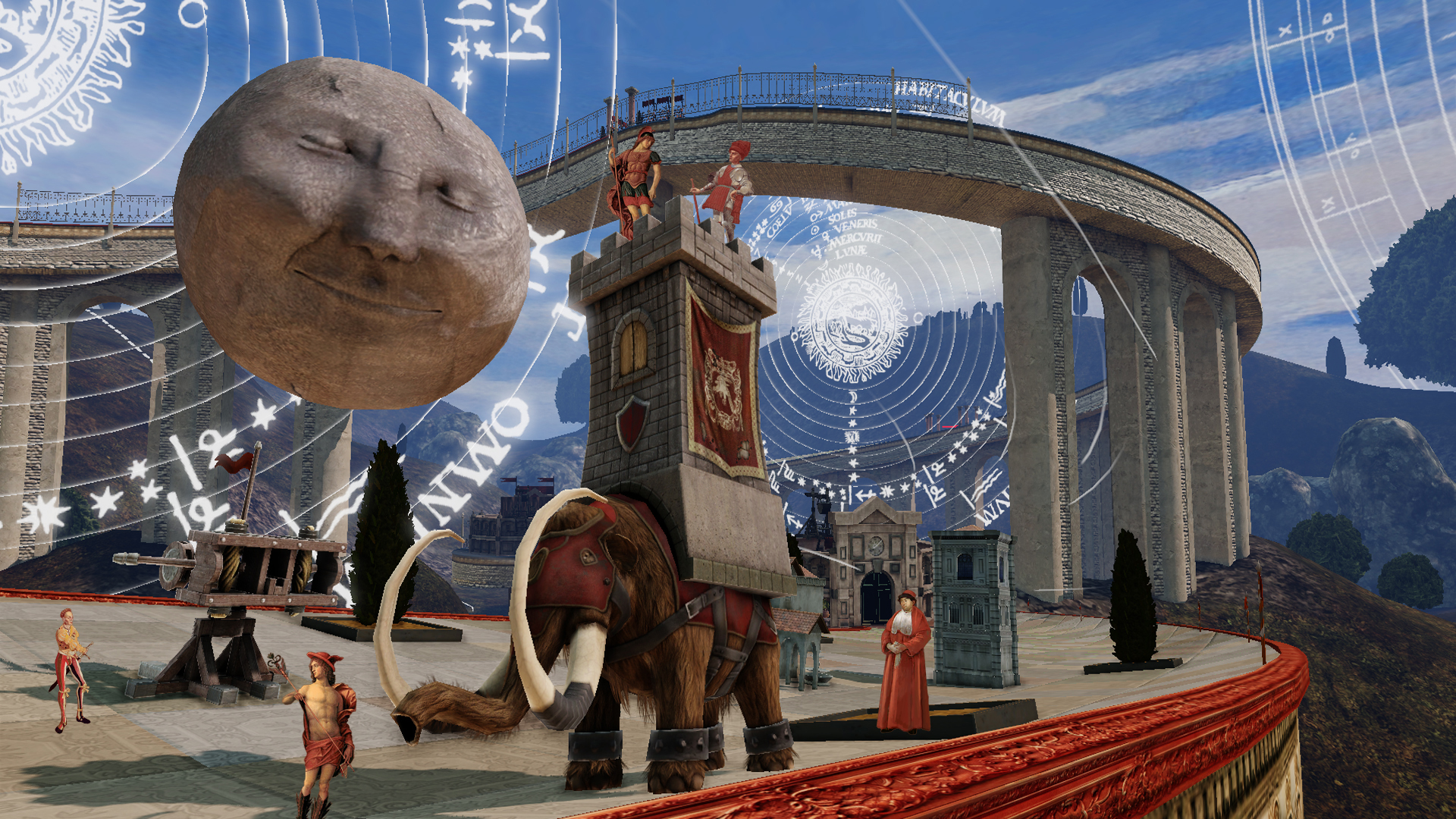
Rock of Ages, one of many Unreal Engine 3 powered games available on Xbox 360

The Xbox 360 launched with 14 games in North America and 13 in Europe. The console's best-selling game for 2005, Call of Duty 2, sold over a million copies. Five other games sold over a million copies in the console's first year on the market: Ghost Recon Advanced Warfighter, The Elder Scrolls IV: Oblivion, Dead or Alive 4, Saints Row, and Gears of War. Gears of War would become the best-selling game on the console with 3 million copies in 2006, before being surpassed in 2007 by Halo 3 with over 8 million copies.

Six games were initially available in Japan, while eagerly anticipated games such as Dead or Alive 4 and Enchanted Arms were released in the weeks following the console's launch. Games targeted specifically for the region, such as Chromehounds, Ninety-Nine Nights, and Phantasy Star Universe, were also released in the console's first year. Microsoft also had the support of Japanese developer Mistwalker, founded by Final Fantasy creator Hironobu Sakaguchi. Mistwalker's first game, Blue Dragon, was released in 2006 and had a limited-edition bundle which sold out quickly with over 10,000 pre-orders. Blue Dragon is one of three Xbox 360 games to surpass 200,000 units in Japan, along with Tales of Vesperia and Star Ocean: The Last Hope. Mistwalker's second game, Lost Odyssey also sold over 100,000 copies.

The 2007 Game Critics Awards honored the Xbox 360 platform with 38 Nominations and 11 Wins.

By 2015, game releases started to decline as most publishers instead focused on the Xbox One. The last official games ever released for the system were FIFA 19 and Just Dance 2019, both of which were released in 2018.

As one of the late updates to the software following its discontinuation, Microsoft will add the ability for Xbox 360 users to use cloud saves even if they do not have Xbox Live Gold prior to the launch of the Xbox Series X and Series S in November 2020. The new consoles will have backward compatibility for all Xbox 360 games that are already backward compatible on the Xbox One and can use any Xbox 360 game's cloud saves through this update, making the transition to the new consoles easier.

=== Interface ===
The Xbox 360's original graphical user interface was the Xbox 360 Dashboard; a tabbed interface that featured five "Blades" (formerly four blades), and was designed by AKQA and Audiobrain. It could be launched automatically when the console booted without a disc in it, or when the disc tray was ejected, but the user had the option to select what the console does if a game is in the tray on start up, or if inserted when already on. A simplified version of it was also accessible at any time via the Xbox Guide button on the gamepad. This simplified version showed the user's gamercard, Xbox Live messages and friends list. It also allowed for personal and music settings, in addition to voice or video chats, or returning to the Xbox Dashboard from the game.

On November 19, 2008, the Xbox 360's dashboard was changed from the "Blade" interface to a dashboard reminiscent of that present on the Zune and Windows Media Center, known as the "New Xbox Experience" or NXE.

Since the console's release, Microsoft has released several updates for the Dashboard software. These updates have included adding new features to the console, enhancing Xbox Live functionality and multimedia playback capabilities, adding compatibility for new accessories, and fixing bugs in the software. Such updates are mandatory for users wishing to use Xbox Live, as access to Xbox Live is disabled until the update is performed.

==== New Xbox Experience ====
At E3 2008, at Microsoft's Show, Microsoft's Aaron Greenberg and Marc Whitten announced the new Xbox 360 interface called the "New Xbox Experience" (NXE). The update was intended to ease console menu navigation. Its GUI uses the Twist UI, previously used in Windows Media Center and the Zune. Its new Xbox Guide retains all Dashboard functionality (including the Marketplace browser and disk ejection) and the original "Blade" interface (although the color scheme has been changed to match that of the NXE Dashboard).

The NXE also provides many new features. Users can now install games from disc to the hard drive to play them with reduced load time and less disc drive noise, but each game's disc must remain in the system in order to run. A new, built-in Community system allows the creation of digitized Avatars that can be used for multiple activities, such as sharing photos or playing Arcade games like 1 vs. 100. The update was released on November 19, 2008.

While previous system updates have been stored on internal memory, the NXE update was the first to require a storage device—at least a 128 MB memory card or a hard drive.

Microsoft released a further update to the Xbox 360 Dashboard starting on December 6, 2011. It included a completely new user interface which utilizes Microsoft's Metro design language and added new features such as cloud storage for game saves and profiles, live television, Bing voice search, access to YouTube videos and better support for Kinect voice commands.

=== Multimedia ===
The Xbox 360 supports videos in Windows Media Video (WMV) format (including high-definition and PlaysForSure videos), as well as H.264 and MPEG-4 media. The December 2007 dashboard update added support for the playback of MPEG-4 ASP format videos. The console can also display pictures and perform slideshows of photo collections with various transition effects, and supports audio playback, with music player controls accessible through the Xbox 360 Guide button. Users may play back their own music while playing games or using the dashboard and can play music with an interactive visual synthesizer.

Music, photos and videos can be played from standard USB mass storage devices, Xbox 360 proprietary storage devices (such as memory cards or Xbox 360 hard drives), and servers or computers with Windows Media Center or Windows XP with Service pack 2 or higher within the local-area network in streaming mode. As the Xbox 360 uses a modified version of the UPnP AV protocol, some alternative UPnP servers such as uShare (part of the GeeXboX project) and MythTV can also stream media to the Xbox 360, allowing for similar functionality from non-Windows servers. This is possible with video files up to HD-resolution and with several codecs (MPEG-2, MPEG-4, WMV) and container formats (WMV, MOV, TS).

As of October 27, 2009, UK and Ireland users are also able to access live and on-demand streams of Sky television programming.

At the 2007, 2008, and 2009 Consumer Electronics Shows, Microsoft had announced that IPTV services would soon be made available to use through the Xbox 360. In 2007, Microsoft chairman Bill Gates stated that IPTV on Xbox 360 was expected to be available to consumers by the holiday season, using the Microsoft TV IPTV Edition platform. In 2008, Gates and president of Entertainment & Devices Robbie Bach announced a partnership with BT in the United Kingdom, in which the BT Vision advanced TV service, using the newer Microsoft Mediaroom IPTV platform, would be accessible via Xbox 360, planned for the middle of the year. BT Vision's DVR-based features would not be available on Xbox 360 due to limited hard drive capacity. In 2010, while announcing version 2.0 of Microsoft Mediaroom, Microsoft CEO Steve Ballmer mentioned that AT&T's U-verse IPTV service would enable Xbox 360s to be used as set-top boxes later in the year. As of January 2010, IPTV on Xbox 360 has yet to be deployed beyond limited trials.

In 2012, Microsoft released the Live Event Player, allowing for events such as video game shows, beauty pageants, award shows, concerts, news and sporting events to be streamed on the console via Xbox Live. The first live events streamed on Live were the 2012 Revolver Golden Gods, Microsoft's E3 2012 media briefing and the Miss Teen USA 2012 beauty pageant.

=== XNA community ===
XNA Community is a feature whereby Xbox 360 owners can receive community-created games, made with Microsoft XNA Game Studio, from the XNA Creators Club. The games are written, published, and distributed through a community managed portal. XNA Community provides a channel for digital videogame delivery over Xbox Live that can be free of royalties, publishers and licenses. XNA game sales, however, did not meet original expectations, though Xbox Live Indie Games (XBLIG) has had some "hits".

== Services ==
=== Xbox Live ===
When the Xbox 360 was released, Microsoft's online gaming service Xbox Live was shut down for 24 hours and underwent a major upgrade, adding a basic non-subscription service called Xbox Live Silver (later renamed Xbox Live Free) to its already established premium subscription-based service (which was renamed Gold). Xbox Live Free is included with all SKUs of the console. It allows users to create a user profile, join on message boards, and access Microsoft's Xbox Live Arcade and Marketplace and talk to other members. A Live Free account does not generally support multiplayer gaming; however, some games that have rather limited online functions already (such as Viva Piñata) and games that feature their own subscription service (e.g. EA Sports games) can be played with a Free account. Xbox Live also supports voice, a feature possible with the Xbox Live Vision.

Xbox Live Gold includes the same features as Free and includes integrated online game playing capabilities outside of third-party subscriptions. Microsoft has allowed previous Xbox Live subscribers to maintain their profile information, friends list, and games history when they make the transition to Xbox Live Gold. To transfer an Xbox Live account to the new system, users need to link a Windows Live ID to their gamertag on Xbox.com. When users add an Xbox Live enabled profile to their console, they are required to provide the console with their passport account information and the last four digits of their credit card number, which is used for verification purposes and billing. An Xbox Live Gold account has an annual cost of US$59.99, C$59.99, NZ$90.00, £39.99, or €59.99. On January 5, 2011, Xbox Live reached over 30 million subscribers.

=== Xbox Live Marketplace ===
The Xbox Live Marketplace was a virtual market designed for the console that allows Xbox Live users to download purchased or promotional content. The service offers movie and game trailers, game demos, Xbox Live Arcade games and Xbox 360 Dashboard themes as well as add-on game content (items, costumes, levels etc.). These features are available to both Free and Gold members on Xbox Live. A hard drive or memory unit is required to store products purchased from Xbox Live Marketplace. In order to download priced content, users are required to purchase Microsoft Points for use as scrip; though some products (such as trailers and demos) are free to download. Microsoft Points can be obtained through prepaid cards in 1,600 and 4,000-point denominations. Microsoft Points can also be purchased through Xbox Live with a credit card in 500, 1,000, 2,000 and 5,000-point denominations. Users are able to view items available to download on the service through a PC via the Xbox Live Marketplace website. An estimated 70 percent of Xbox Live users have downloaded items from the Marketplace. The Xbox 360 Marketplace was discontinued on July 29, 2024.

=== Xbox Live Arcade ===
Xbox Live Arcade is an online service operated by Microsoft that is used to distribute downloadable video games to Xbox and Xbox 360 owners. In addition to classic arcade games such as Ms. Pac-Man, the service offers some new original games like Assault Heroes. The Xbox Live Arcade also features games from other consoles, such as the PlayStation game Castlevania: Symphony of the Night and PC games such as Zuma. The service was first launched on November 3, 2004, using a DVD to load, and offered games for about US$5 to $15. Items are purchased using Microsoft Points, a proprietary currency used to reduce credit card transaction charges. On November 22, 2005, Xbox Live Arcade was re-launched with the release of the Xbox 360, in which it was now integrated with the Xbox 360's dashboard. The games are generally aimed toward more casual gamers; examples of the more popular games are Geometry Wars, Street Fighter II' Hyper Fighting, and Uno. On March 24, 2010, Microsoft introduced the Game Room to Xbox Live. Game Room is a gaming service for Xbox 360 and Microsoft Windows that lets players compete in classic arcade and console games in a virtual arcade.

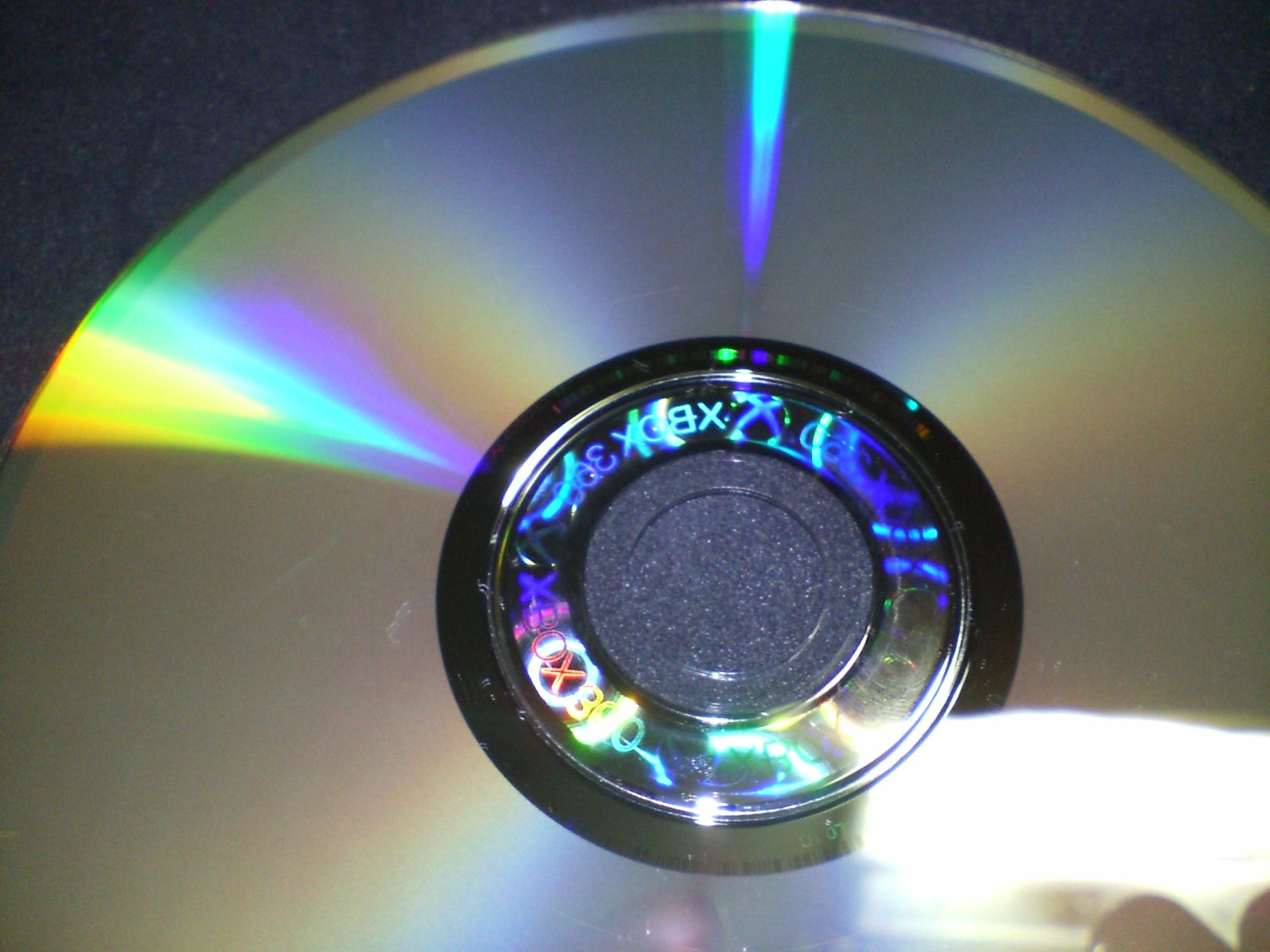
DVD-ROM for Xbox 360

=== Movies and TV ===
On November 6, 2006, Microsoft announced the Xbox Video Marketplace, an exclusive video store accessible through the console. Launched in the United States on November 22, 2006, the first anniversary of the Xbox 360's launch, the service allows users in the United States to download high-definition and standard-definition television shows and movies onto an Xbox 360 console for viewing. With the exception of short clips, content is not currently available for streaming, and must be downloaded. Movies are also available for rental. They expire in 14 days after download or at the end of the first 24 hours after the movie has begun playing, whichever comes first. Television episodes can be purchased to own, and are transferable to an unlimited number of consoles. Downloaded files use 5.1 surround audio and are encoded using VC-1 for video at 720p, with a bitrate of 6.8 Mbit/s. Television content is offered from MTV, VH1, Comedy Central, Turner Broadcasting, and CBS; and movie content is Warner Bros., Paramount, and Disney, along with other publishers.

After the Spring 2007 update, the following video codecs are supported:

- H.264 video support: Up to 15 Mbit/s, Baseline, Main, and High (up to level 4.1) Profiles with 2 channel AAC LC and Main Profiles.
- MPEG-4 Part 2 video support: Up to 8 Mbit/s, Simple Profile with 2 channel AAC LC and Main Profiles.

As a late addition to the December Xbox 360 update, 25 movies were added to the European Xbox 360 video market place on the December 11, 2007 and cost 250 Microsoft points for the SD version of the movie and 380 points for the HD version of the movie. Xbox Live members in Canada featured the ability to go on the Xbox Live Marketplace also as of December 11, 2007 with around 30 movies to be downloaded for the same number of Microsoft Points.

On May 26, 2009, Microsoft announced it would release the Zune HD (in the fall of 2009), which was then the next addition to the Zune product range. This was of an impact on the Xbox Live Video Store as it was also announced that the Zune Video Marketplace and the Xbox Live Video Store will be merged to form the Zune Marketplace, which will be arriving on Xbox Live in 7 countries initially, the United Kingdom, the United States, France, Italy, Germany, Ireland and Spain. Further details were released at the Microsoft press conference at E3 2009.

On October 16, 2012, Xbox Video and Xbox Music were released, replacing the Zune Marketplace. Xbox Video is a digital video service on that offers full HD movies and TV series for purchase or rental on Xbox 360, Windows 8, Windows RT PCs and tablets, and Windows Phones.

On August 18, 2015, Microsoft rolled out an update renaming it Movies and TV similar to the Windows 10 App.

=== Groove Music ===
Xbox Music provides 30 million music tracks available for purchase or access through subscription. It was announced at the Electronic Entertainment Expo 2012 and it integrates with Windows 8 and Windows Phone as well.

In August 2015 Microsoft rolled out an update renaming it to Groove Music similar to the Windows 10 App.

=== Xbox SmartGlass ===
Xbox SmartGlass allows for integration between the Xbox 360 console and mobile devices such as tablets and smartphones. An app is available on Android, Windows Phone 8 and iOS. Users of the feature can view additional content to accompany the game they are playing, or the TV shows and movies they are watching. They can also use their mobile device as a remote to control the Xbox 360. The SmartGlass functionality can also be found in the Xbox 360's successor, the Xbox One.

== Game development ==
PartnerNet, the developers-only alternative Xbox Live network used by developers to beta test game content developed for Xbox Live Arcade, runs on Xbox 360 debug kits, which are used both by developers and by the gaming press. In a podcast released on February 12, 2007, a developer breached the PartnerNet non-disclosure agreement (NDA) by commenting that he had found a playable version of Alien Hominid and an unplayable version of Ikaruga on PartnerNet. A few video game journalists, misconstruing the breach of the NDA as an invalidation of the NDA, immediately began reporting on other games being tested via PartnerNet, including a remake of Jetpac. (Alien Hominid for the Xbox 360 was released on February 28 of that year, and Ikaruga was released over a year later on April 9, 2008. Jetpac was released for the Xbox 360 on March 28, 2007, as Jetpac Refuelled). There have also been numerous video and screenshot leaks of game footage on PartnerNet, as well as a complete version of Sonic the Hedgehog 4: Episode I, which caused for the whole PartnerNet service to be shut down overnight on April 3, 2010. In the following days, Microsoft reminded developers and journalists that they were in breach of NDA by sharing information about PartnerNet content and asked websites to remove lists of games in development that were discovered on the service. Sega used feedback from fans about the leaked version of Sonic the Hedgehog 4: Episode I to refine it before they eventually released it. Additionally, a pair of hackers played their modded Halo 3 games on PartnerNet in addition to using PartnerNet to find unreleased and untested software. The hackers passed this information along to their friends before they were eventually caught by Bungie. Consequently, Bungie left a message for the hackers on PartnerNet which read "Winners Don't Break Into PartnerNet". Other games that were leaked in the PartnerNet fiasco include Shenmue and Shenmue II.

== See also ==
- List of Xbox 360 games
- List of Xbox 360 applications
- List of original programs distributed by Xbox Entertainment Studios
