= Kassa (TV program) =

Dutch consumer television programme

- Created by: Felix Meurders
- Presented by: Felix Meurders (1989–2011); Brecht van Hulten (2011–2019); Amber Kortzorg (2018–2019, 2020–present)
- Country of origin: Netherlands
- Original language: Dutch

Production
- Producer: BNNVARA (a part of NPO)

Original release
- Network: Nederland 1/NPO 1 (1989–1991, 2006–present); Nederland 2 (1991–1992); Nederland 3 (1992–2006)
- Release: 1989 – present

Related
- Kassa 2; Kassa, De Verlenging

Kassa (English: Cash Register) is a Dutch consumer television program produced by BNNVARA (formerly just VARA), which was created by Felix Meurders. Meurders hosted the program from 1989 to 2011. From 2011 to 2019 it was hosted by Brecht van Hulten. Since 2020 it is hosted by Amber Kortzorg. The program focuses on consumer affairs, reviewing and testing products, and also doing investigative reporting on issues with products or services. VARA also produces spinoffs of Kassa, such as a daily internet program called "Consumentennieuws" (Consumer News), Kassa 3 - aimed more towards youth audiences, and Radio Kassa, a consumer news talk program.

In 2004, the VARA received the Dutch "Spin-Award" prize from the general public in the Netherlands. On 29 September 2007, Kassa won an award in the Prix Italia for the show's interactive web content.

== Xbox 360 investigations ==
In February 2007, Kassa brought significant media attention when it aired an investigative report on disc scratching problems with Microsoft's Xbox 360 video game console.
