= Robert J. Bach =

American businessman

Robbie Bach
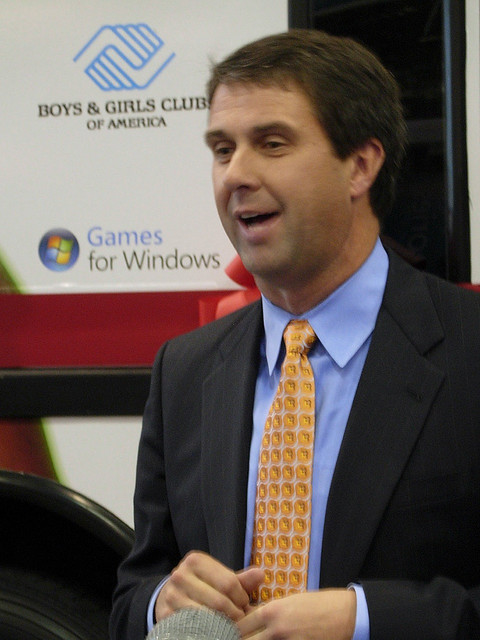
- Bach in 2006
- Born: December 31, 1961 (age 64); Peoria, Illinois
- Education: University of North Carolina at Chapel Hill; Stanford University
- Website: www.robbiebach.com

Robert J. Bach (born December 31, 1961) is an American businessman and former Microsoft executive. He was Microsoft’s first chief Xbox officer, leading the company’s original effort to enter the video game console market with the Xbox.

Bach later served as president of Microsoft’s Entertainment and Devices Division, which included Xbox, Xbox 360, Zune, Games for Windows, Windows Phone and the Microsoft TV platform. After 22 years at Microsoft, he announced his retirement in 2010. He became a public speaker, and wrote Xbox Revisited: A Game Plan for Corporate and Civic Renewal, published in 2015.

== Early life and education ==
Bach was born in Peoria, Illinois, and is the son of a former Schlitz executive.

He graduated from Richard J. Reynolds High School in Winston-Salem, North Carolina in 1980. Bach was a Morehead Scholar at the University of North Carolina at Chapel Hill, where he graduated with highest honors in economics and was named an Academic All-American on the Tar Heels varsity tennis team. He went to work for Morgan Stanley for two years before becoming an Arjay Miller Scholar at Stanford University Graduate School of Business, where he earned his MBA.

In 2015, he published Xbox Revisited: A Game Plan for Corporate and Civic Renewal.

== Career ==
Bach joined Microsoft in 1988, and remained with the company until 2010. In his 22 years with the company, he worked in various marketing, general management and business leadership roles, including the following:

- Product manager (Microsoft Works)
- Business operations manager (Europe)
- Vice president of Marketing (Desktop Applications Division)
- Vice president of Learning (Entertainment and Productivity Division)
- Vice president of the Home and Retail Division
- Senior vice president of Home and Entertainment Division
- President of the Entertainment and Devices Division

=== Microsoft Europe ===
From 1990 to 1992, Bach served as the business operations manager for Microsoft Europe, reporting to the president of Microsoft Europe in Paris, where he coordinated business planning and strategy, budgeting, and special projects. He also helped unify Microsoft's once-divided European local units.

=== Microsoft Office ===
Bach helped lead marketing for Microsoft Office during the 1990s as the company competed with WordPerfect and Lotus. In July 1996, he was promoted to vice president of marketing for the Desktop Applications Division, where he led marketing for Office, Word, Excel, Access, PowerPoint, Publisher, FrontPage and Works. During this period, the office software market shifted from DOS-based standalone programs toward Windows-based application suites, and Microsoft Office became the dominant office-suite product by the end of 1998.

=== President, Entertainment & Devices Division ===
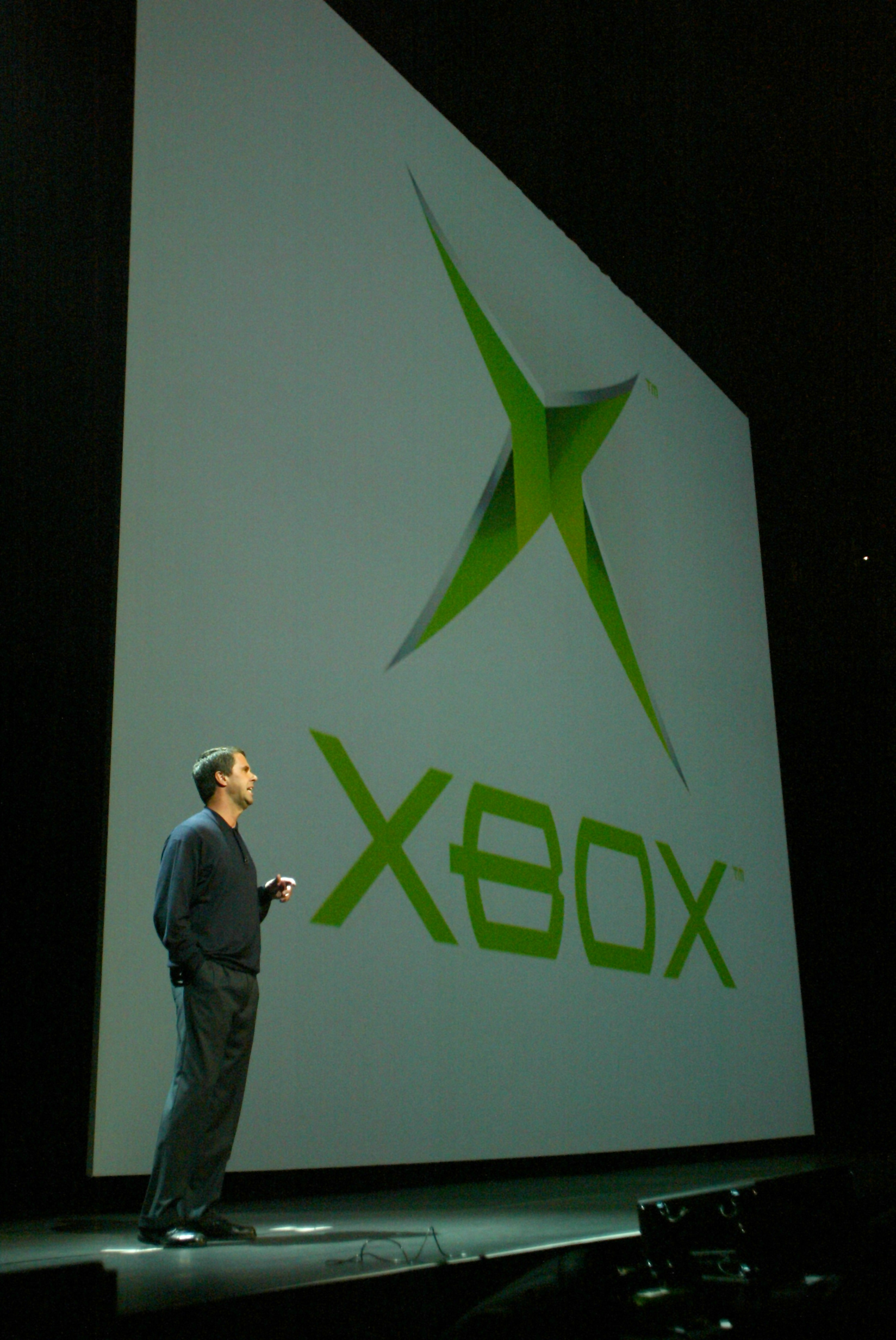
Bach presenting at the 2004 Xbox conference, Shrine Auditorium, Los Angeles

Bach became Microsoft's first chief Xbox officer in 1999, a title used during the original Xbox effort as Microsoft organized its entry into the console market.

As president of Microsoft's Entertainment and Devices Division in the 2000s, Bach oversaw consumer businesses including Xbox, Zune, IPTV, and Windows Mobile. In a 2007 interview with the San Francisco Chronicle, Bach described the division's strategy as bringing together video, music, gaming, and mobile products into a coherent entertainment experience across PCs, Xbox, Zune, and phones.

== Post-Microsoft activities ==
After leaving Microsoft, Bach became a public speaker on business, leadership, and civic issues. He has served on the boards of several companies and nonprofit organizations, including the following:

- Boys & Girls Clubs of America: board chairman 2008–2010; board of governors 2005–present
- Sonos: board of governors 2011–present
- United States Olympic Committee: board of directors 2011–present
- Bipartisan Policy Center: board of directors 2016–present
- Brooks Sports: board of advisers 2011–2015
- Year Up Puget Sound: board of directors 2012–present
- Space Needle: board of directors 2011–present
- Maninis Inc.: co-owner 2014–present
