= Xbox 360 technical problems =

Errors and technical difficulties on Xbox 360

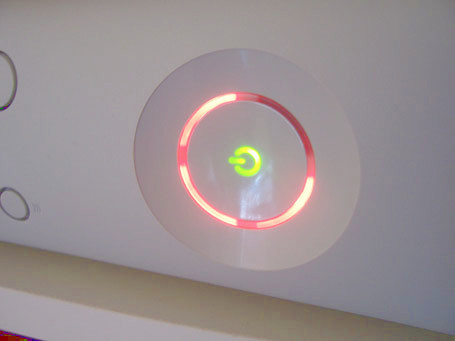
Three red lights, representing a "General Error requiring service of the Console or Power Adapter", nicknamed the "Red Ring of Death"

The Xbox 360 video game console was subject to a number of technical problems and failures, some as a result of design flaws. Some issues could be identified by a pattern of red lights on the front face of the console; these colloquially became known as the "Red Ring of Death" or the "RRoD". There were also other issues, such as discs becoming scratched in the drive and "bricking" of consoles due to dashboard updates.

There were many conflicting estimates of the console's unusually high failure rate. The warranty provider SquareTrade estimated it at 23.7% in 2009, while a Game Informer survey reported 54.2%. Among the consoles owned by employees of Joystiq, which saw heavy use for games journalism purposes, the failure rate had reached 90% by the end of 2007. The crisis was ultimately abated from 2009 by design revisions to the later-produced Xbox models; the S model in particular was far more resilient. By 2012 the failure rate for the Xbox 360 family was comparable to the PS3 failure rate.

The issues proved extremely damaging for Microsoft. Repairs and shipping of replacement hardware cost the company US$1.15 billion. The issues triggered multiple lawsuits, cost the Xbox ground in the console wars and threatened the long term viability of the Xbox brand.

== History ==
The design of the Xbox 360 was a hurried process subject to a number of late changes. This included the addition of a hard disk drive, which compromised airflow in the machine. The holes in the case were added to try to ameliorate this airflow issue. Time pressures also resulted in insufficient testing. Microsoft was aware of myriad technical challenges as early as August 2005, including "overheating graphics chips, cracking heat sinks, cosmetic issues with the hard disk and the front of the box, underperforming graphics memory chips from Infineon, a problem with the DVD drive – and more". Manufacturing issues with the GPU were ultimately what caused the infamous "Red Ring" issues, while the DVD drive issue was later responsible for scratching discs. An engineer requested a shut down of the production line that month, but this did not occur out of fear of a delay to console delivery in some regions.

The console launched in November 2005 in North America, swiftly followed by other regions. However, consoles began failing "almost immediately". Microsoft initially dismissed these concerns as "isolated reports", that were within the normal range of failure (around 2%). In late 2005, Microsoft's internal data was reporting a failure rate during manufacturing of around 6–7%. These consoles were not shipped to consumers but remained in warehouses. By March 2006, around 30% of consoles manufactured were either returned or had failed checks at the factory. At one point Microsoft's yield was as low as 32% (meaning a failure rate of 68%).

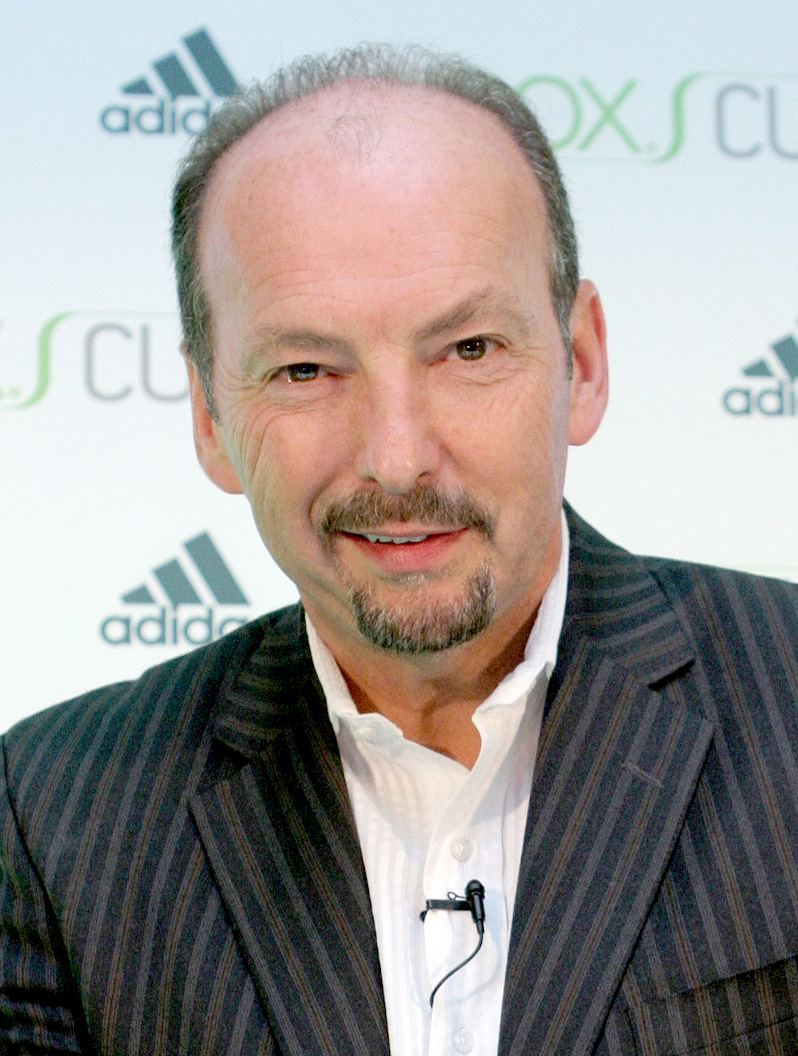
Peter Moore (pictured in 2006) advocated for the Xbox 360 return and replacement program within Microsoft.

Peter Moore, the Vice President of Microsoft's Interactive Entertainment Business division in 2015 detailed a conversation he had with Microsoft CEO Steve Ballmer on his planned response to the incident in the mid 2000s. He stated:

"...here's what we have to do: we need to FedEx an empty box to a customer who had a problem - they would call us up - with a FedEx return label to send your box, and then we would FedEx it back to them and fix it. ... I always remember $240m of that was FedEx. ... It was sickening. I was doing a lot of interviews. ... We couldn't figure it out. ... There was a theory. We had changed our solder, which is the way you put the GPU and the fans, to lead-free. ... We think it was somehow the heat coming off the GPU was drying out some of the solder, and it wasn't the normal stuff we'd used, because we had to meet European Standards and take the lead out. ... He said, 'what's it going to cost?' I remember taking a deep breath, looking at Robbie, and saying, 'we think it's $1.15bn, Steve.' He said, 'do it.' There was no hesitation. ... If we hadn't made that decision there and then, and tried to fudge over this problem, then the Xbox brand and Xbox One wouldn't exist today."

While Peter Moore theorized that cracking lead-free solder was the issue, the same solder was applied to attach the CPU, and the CPU did not have any issues. This was an early theory which was later proven incorrect.

In July 2007 Moore published an open letter recognizing the console's problems, as well as announcing a three-year warranty from the original date of purchase for every Xbox 360 console that experienced the "general hardware failure" (Red Ring) issue. That October a class action lawsuit was brought against Microsoft due to the problems the console had with disc scratching, which could render games unplayable. The case was lengthy and worked through the court system over the following decade, with litigation focusing on the validity of class certification. In 2017 the matter was decided by the United States Supreme Court in Microsoft Corp. v. Baker, which settled in favor of Microsoft.

During the Game Developers Conference in February 2008, Microsoft announced that the failure rate had "dropped", but did not mention any specifics. The same month, electronics warranty provider SquareTrade published an examination of 1040 Xbox 360s and said that they suffered from a failure rate of 16.4%. Of the 171 failures, 60% were due to a general hardware failure (and thus fell under the 3 year extended warranty). And of the remaining 40% which were not covered by the extended warranty, 18% were disc read errors, 13% were video card failures, 13% were hard drive freezes, 10% were power issues and 7% were disc tray malfunctions. SquareTrade also stated that its estimates are likely significantly lower than reality due to the time span of the sample (six to ten months), the eventual failure of many consoles that did not occur within this time span and the fact that most owners did not deal with SquareTrade and had their consoles repaired directly through Microsoft via the extended RROD warranty.

From 2008 the crisis began to abate due to design revisions. Later Falcon and Jasper models sold that year had a failure rate of under 4%, with the overall product family rate at around 12% in the first quarter. The Xbox 360 S launched in 2010 and had a far lower failure rate. The S models did not include segmented outer ring lights like the launch model, and were not included in the extended warranty. The 360 family as a whole was discontinued in 2016, but Microsoft continued to offer repairs for a time after that.

Microsoft did not reveal the full technical details of the problem until a 2021 documentary on the history of Xbox, though earlier independent investigations had correctly identified the issues with cracking high-lead C4 bumps inside the GPU, which connect the GPU die to its substrate interposer. In a nod to the incident, Microsoft sold Red Ring holiday sweaters in December 2024. The item was popular among Microsoft employees.

== General Hardware Failure ("Red Ring") errors ==
The error codes of the original Xbox 360 model

The launch model of the Xbox 360 includes four lights in a ring around the power button, on the front face of the console. Green indicated normal operation, while red lights were used for error codes. Most famously, three red lights indicated a "general hardware failure". The error was coined the "Red Ring of Death" after Windows' Blue Screen of Death error. The error was sometimes preceded by freeze-ups, graphical problems in the middle of gameplay, such as checkerboard or pinstripe patterns on the screen, and sound errors; mostly consisting of extremely loud noises that could not be affected by the volume control, and the console only responding when the power button was pressed to turn it off. The problem was most prevalent in early models.

This error code was usually caused by the failure of one or more hardware components, although it could indicate that the console is not receiving enough power from the power supply. This could be caused by a faulty or improperly connected power supply. The three flashing lights could also be caused by power surges. Unplugging and restarting the console fixed this issue in some cases.

On the Xbox 360 S and E models, the power button utilizes a different design that does not incorporate the same style of lighting that past models used. A flashing red light means that the console is overheating, similar to the two-light error code on the original model Xbox 360; however, an on-screen message also appears, telling the user that the console will automatically power off to protect itself from overheating. A solid red light is similar to the one-light error if an "E XX" error message is displayed and a three-light error code if the error message is absent.

=== E74 error ===
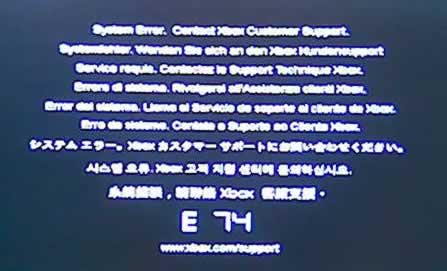
Example of an E74 error message

The related E74 error caused only a single of the red ring quadrants to illuminate, and the screen to display an error message in multiple languages: "System Error. Contact Xbox Customer Support", with the code E74 at the bottom. Much like the infamous Red Ring issue, the error was related to connection issues between the GPU and eDRAM dies, but could also be caused by a more general GPU or eDRAM die failure. The E74 issue was covered by the three-year extended warranty from 2009 as Microsoft considered it part of the same issue as the Red Ring, and customers who previously paid Microsoft for out-of-warranty service to correct the E74 error received a refund.

=== Four light segment error code ===
The console would illuminate all four lights if it could not detect an AV cable. This was not triggered by later revisions of the console which included a HDMI port. In some cases the four lights indicated a more serious problem with the console, followed by a 2-digit error code. The four lights would also be illuminated briefly by power issues such as surges or brief outages.

=== Causes ===
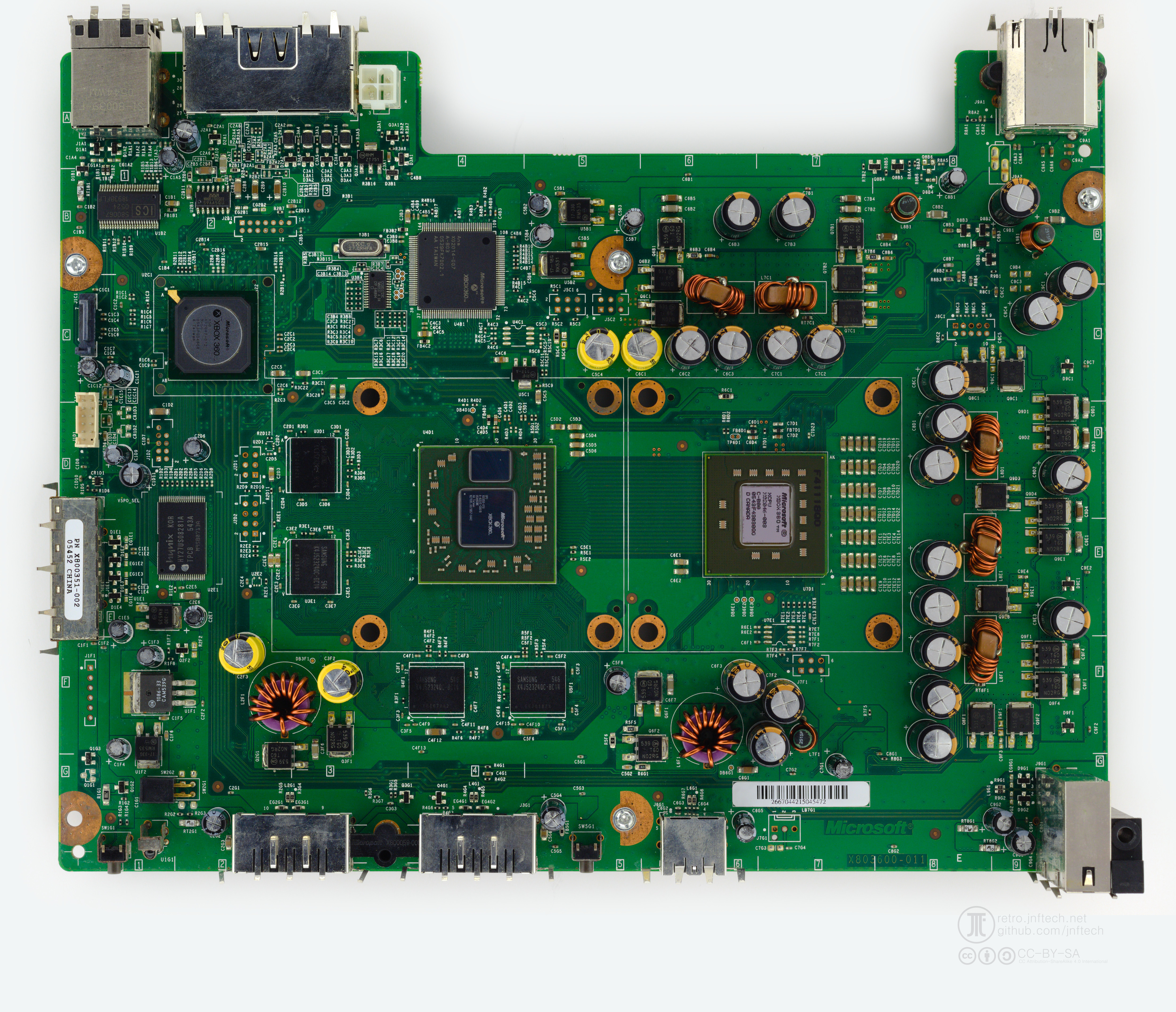
The launch Xbox 360 Xenon motherboard

Microsoft did not reveal the cause of the issues publicly until 2021, when a 6-part documentary on the history of Xbox was released. The Red Ring issue was caused by the cracking of high-lead C4 solder bumps inside the GPU flip chip package, connecting the GPU and eDRAM dies to the substrate interposer, as a result of thermal stress from heating up and cooling back down when the system is power cycled. An engineer directly stated that the problem was not peak temperature, disproving the overheating theories that were commonly blamed. Microsoft had switched to lead-free solder on the motherboard due to regulations in the European Union, but C4 bumps inside flip chip packages were excluded, thus using high-lead bumps instead. This disproves the lead-free solder theory, as the joints that were breaking were high-lead bumps inside the chip package itself, not the lead-free connections to the motherboard.

The reason the high-lead C4 bumps would crack was due to an improper type of underfill being used. As common at the time, TSMC and their packaging partners used an underfill which had a relatively low glass transition temperature (T_{g}). This temperature would be exceeded at normal operating temperatures, making it vulnerable to thermal stress from temperatures repeatably going from ambient to operating and vice-versa. Once the T_{g} was surpassed, the underfill lost structural integrity and provided less mechanical support to the C4 bumps.

The combination of high-lead C4 bumps and low-T_{g} underfill was also specifically known to be bad, in a study done by IBM and Amkor Technology. For this reason, the XCPU used high-lead bumps and higher-T_{g} underfill and was reliable.

=== Theories ===
Many independent investigations came to various conclusions at the time, blaming thermal stress on the GPU and the solder as the culprit. However, as the breaking connections were not lead-free, these theories were incorrect. The biggest evidence for this, is that the XCPU was soldered with the same lead-free solder as the GPU but experienced very little failures.

Some theories blame Microsoft for designing the GPU chip in-house, rather than using an ASIC vendor, but this was also not correct. The GPU was designed by ATI Technologies for the Year-1 (Xenon) and Year-2 (Zephyr) revisions, with only the Year-3 (65 nm) being designed in-house. This Year-3 GPU proved reliable.

The Guardian also claimed that using Xbox Kinect with an old Xenon generation Xbox would cause the Red Ring, but this was denied by Microsoft.

=== Solution ===
This cracking C4 bump issue was ultimately corrected by switching to a higher glass transition temperature (T_{g}) underfill, and by other manufacturing improvements. The first fixed GPUs were installed in Falcon consoles in mid 2008 onwards. Microsoft also produced updated fixed versions of the Year-1 GPU for refurbishing/repairing launch Xenon consoles. This fix was also applied to the upcoming in-house designed Year-3 (65 nm) GPU, used in Jasper and Tonasket console revisions.

== Scratched discs ==
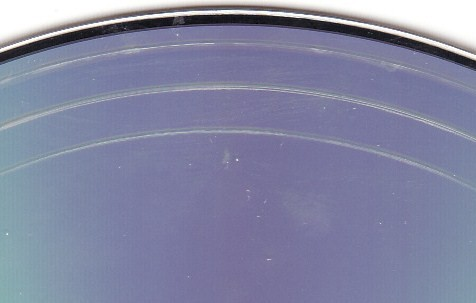
Disc that has been scratched by the Xbox 360 console

The design of the disc drive was flawed, and could cause scratches on discs, particularly if the console was moved while the disc was spinning. Unlike the Red Ring issues, the disc scratching was not resolved by hardware revisions and was present in the S and E models. Those versions shipped with a sticker informing users that moving the console while powered on posed a risk. Even on static footing however, normal floor vibrations that would occur in a household environment were enough to cause disc scratches. The issue was particularly prevalent in 2006 models.

The issue was subject to multiple independent investigations, initially by the Dutch television program Kassa and later by the European Commissioner for Consumer Protection and the BBC. The BBC investigation in particular involved laboratory conditions for testing. The issue ultimately led to a Supreme Court case which was ruled in favor of Microsoft in 2017.

=== Disc replacement ===
Although discs scratched by the Xbox 360 were not covered under its warranty, Microsoft's Xbox Disc Replacement Program sold customers a new copy of discs scratched by the Xbox 360, if they were published in countries where the Xbox was originally sold, at a cost of $20. The published list of games that qualify, however, was limited. Third party games were only ever replaced at the discretion of the publishers. Electronic Arts for example offered replacements made within 90 days of purchase.

=== Causes ===
Independent investigations concluded that the disc drives lacked a mechanism to secure the disc solidly in place. Tilting or moving the console, when operating with a disc spinning inside, can potentially cause damage to the disc and in some cases render the disc unplayable as a result. Microsoft engineers were aware of the issue ahead of launch, around September or October of 2005. However, installing "bumpers" to prevent the discs moving out of alignment would have added 50 cents to the production cost of each console, and was not implemented. An alternative would have been to slow the disc rotation speed but this would have led to increased loading times, and magnetic adjustments would not have been possible due to the disc tray locking mechanism.

== Problematic updates ==
Several Xbox 360 system updates caused major issues for users.

=== November 2006 patch ===
An update patch released on November 1, 2006 was reported to "brick" consoles, rendering them useless. The most obvious issue occurred after the installation of the patch, after which the console immediately rebooted and showed an error message. Usually, error code E71 was shown during or directly after the booting animation.

In response to the November 2006 update error that "bricked" his console, a California man filed a class action lawsuit against Microsoft in Washington federal court in early December 2006. The lawsuit sought $5 million in damages and the free repair of any console rendered unusable by the update. This was the second such lawsuit filed against Microsoft, the first having been filed in December 2005, shortly after the 360's launch. Following Microsoft's extension of the Xbox 360 warranty to a full year, from the previous 90 days, the California man's attorney confirmed to the Seattle Post Intelligencer that the lawsuit had been resolved under confidential terms.

=== "New Xbox Experience" ===
On November 19, 2008, Microsoft released the "New Xbox Experience" (NXE). This update provided streaming Netflix capability and avatars; however, some users reported the update caused their consoles to not properly read optical media. Others reported that the update disabled audio through HDMI connections. A Microsoft spokesperson stated the company was "aware that a handful of Xbox LIVE users are experiencing audio issues, and are diligently monitoring this issue and working towards a solution." Microsoft released a patch on February 3, 2009 for the HDMI audio issues.

=== May 2011 patch ===
A patch released in May 2011 prevented some users from playing games from discs. The update involved "a change in the disc reading algorithms", but would simply inform users that the disc was unreadable and ask them to clean it with a cloth.

== Issues with peripherals ==
=== Wireless Racing Wheel ===
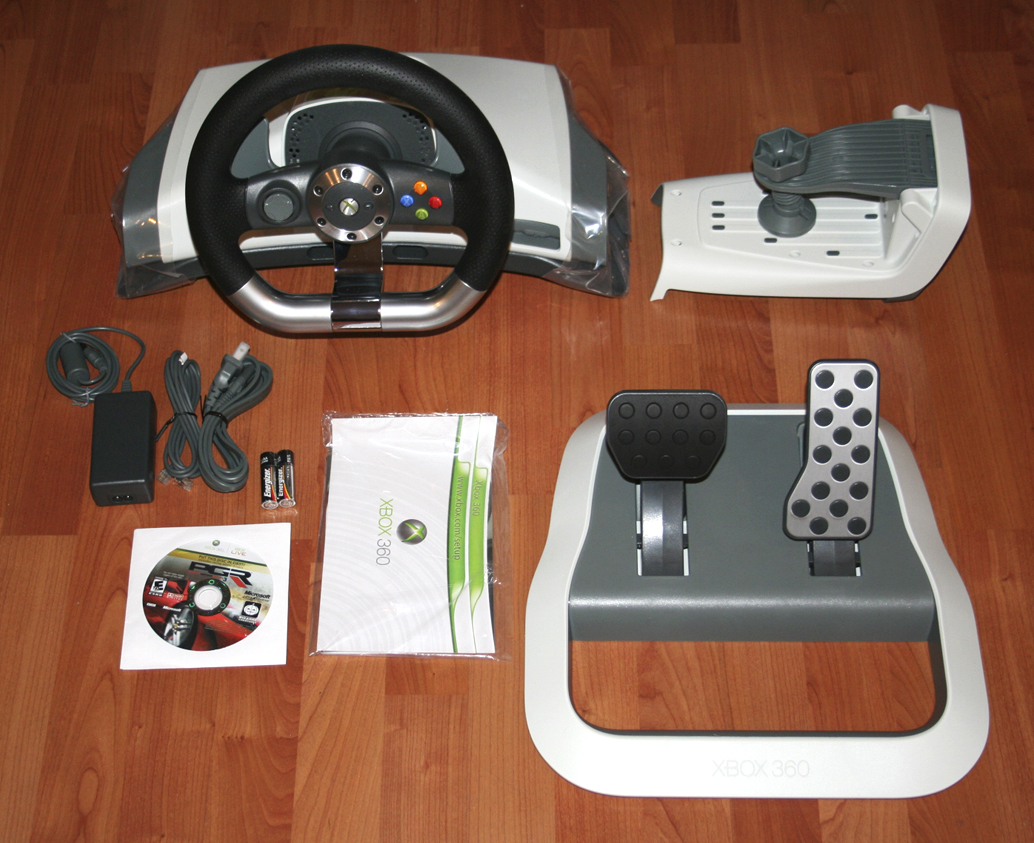
The racing wheels also had overheating issues, and were nicknamed "Hotwheels".

In 2007, the official steering wheel peripheral faced issues with overheating and releasing smoke, prompting the "Hotwheels" nickname. Microsoft encouraged users to only use the steering wheel in battery mode rather than while plugged in. That August a product recall was issued, with Microsoft retrofitting the existing steering wheels to remedy the problem.

=== Nyko Intercooler ===
The Nyko Intercooler was a popular aftermarket cooler, purchased by users who wished to improve air flow in an attempt to avoid the red-ring issue. While the exact cause of red-ring was not yet public in the late 2000s, it was known that temperature was an issue. Unfortunately, the Nyko Intercooler itself had issues and its usage could cause the red-ring or damage the power DC input. The Intercooler could also melt itself onto the 360, melt the powercord, or make itself extremely hard to remove.

Microsoft stated that the peripheral drained too much power from the console (the Intercooler power cord was installed between the Xbox 360 power supply and the console itself), could cause faults to occur, and stated that consoles fitted with the peripheral would have their warranties voided. Nyko released an updated Intercooler that used its own power source, and claimed the problem no longer occurred, but this did not affect Microsoft's stance on the warranty.

== See also ==
- Microsoft Corp. v. Baker: U.S. Supreme Court case based on the problems
- Blue Screen of Death
- Yellow Light of Death
