= Attach rate =

Business term

The attach rate is a concept used broadly in business, especially in marketing, to represent the number of units of a secondary product/service sold as a direct or implied consequence of the sale of a primary product/service. It is often expressed as a sales ratio of primary to secondary units, or as secondary units sold as a percent of primary. The secondary good/service may be an integral component of the primary purchase (e.g., Bluetooth circuits/capabilities sold within electronic devices) or it may require a further consumer decision (e.g., as in video games sold per unit of the primary console sold). For the latter, the association between the primary and secondary may be general and loose (e.g., DVD-Video discs purchased per primary DVD player sold), or may be the result of product-specific designs (e.g., as with console-specific video games, or sales of phone-specific accessories per unit of a particular mobile phone sold).

The attach rate concept is widely used as a means of reporting desirable sales associations/outcomes in the computer/video gaming industry, and in technology-related marketing in general. While complexities of real situations can obscure interpretation, attach rates often provide a metric for marketers of both primary and secondary products, allowing them to assess and even forecast the impact of the popularity of a given technology platform. Rapid sales of primary products create the market for the secondary product; conversely, the sale of platform-specific secondary products provides an indication of longer term demand for the primary platform. Real interpretive complications in technology include the general rapid evolution of both primary and secondary products, as well as factors such as changes to attach rates over a product's life cycle (e.g., because of the unrepresentative behavior of early adopters). Attach rates for products are also used more broadly in marketing, and strategically, attach rates can factor into the decision of a primary product manufacturer to merge with or acquire a secondary product manufacturer, and in the valuation of businesses in such times of times of mergers and acquisitions.

== Definition and analysis ==
The attach rate is a concept used broadly in business, especially in marketing, to represent the number of units of a secondary product or service sold as a direct or implied consequence of the sale of a primary product or service. It is often expressed as a sales ratio of primary to secondary units, or as secondary units sold as a percent of primary.

The good or service may rely upon a secondary consumer decision (e.g., as in console-specific video games purchased per primary console sale), or be an integral component of the primary purchase (e.g., Bluetooth circuits/capabilities shipped within primary electronic devices sold). For those requiring secondary decisions, the association between the primary and secondary may be general (e.g., the loose association between sale of one or more brands of DVD-Video discs purchased per primary DVD player sale), or may be the result of product-specific designs (e.g., the foregoing video game–console tight association, similarly with phone-specific accessories for particular mobile phones).

The attach rate concept is widely used as a means of reporting desirable sales associations/outcomes in the gaming industry, though it is common in many technology-related marketing discussions. For instance, in an example related to computer or game console software, a situation may occur wherein:

- Platform hardware type A has sold 1,000 units, and software publishers have subsequently sold 5,000 titles specific to Platform A, and
- Platform B has sold 10,000 hardware units, and software publishers have subsequently sold 10,000 titles specific to Platform B.

In this example, Platform A has a much higher attach rate (5 titles sold per hardware unit sold, or 5:1), versus Platform B (1 title sold per hardware unit sold, or 1:1) Hence, while in absolute terms, Platform B is outselling Platform A (by a factor of 10:1), the much higher attach rate of Platform A (5:1, vs. 1:1) has business implications. In particular, software publishers may view Platform A as the more attractive, depending on the rate of sales of each platform, because that platform only needs to sell an additional 1,000 units for their title sales to match the sales related to Platform B.

== Interpretations ==
=== Marketing ===
While complexities of real situations can obscure interpretation, attach rates can provide a measure for marketers of both primary and secondary products, allowing them to assess and even forecast the impact of the popularity of a given product (e.g., of a given gaming or other technology platform). Rapid sales of primary products such as game consoles, personal computers, and cell phones create the market for a host of secondary products. Conversely, in cases where the secondary product purchase requires a further customer decision—i.e., ignoring integral examples like the Bluetooth case—the sale of platform-specific secondary products provides an indication of longer term demand for that primary platform, or related versions of that platform, to continue to support the secondary product.

Real circumstances in technology and other business sectors complicate interpretation of attach rates. These complications include the rapid evolution of both primary and secondary products (e.g., the evolution of gaming platforms away from being single use devices, and of games from having only a single means of distribution). As well, factors such as changes in attach rates early in life cycle (when behavior of early adopters of technology is unrepresentative of the overall market) and late (when consumer behavior may have changed with regard to how they use the primary product) also make interpretation and forecasting of attach rates difficult.

=== Strategic ===
Attach rates for products can factor into the decision of a primary product manufacturer to merge with or acquire a secondary product manufacturer, and can impact the valuation of businesses in such times of times of mergers and acquisitions.

== Example uses of the term ==
- AT&T U-verse: "We are seeing clear improvements in access-line retention when consumers subscribe to U-verse, and the broadband attach rate for U-verse is greater than 90%."
- WETA television programming.
