= Spider's Web (play) =

1954 play by Agatha Christie

- Programme cover of original production
- Original language: English
- Written by: Agatha Christie

Premiere
- Date: 27 September 1954
- Place: United Kingdom

Spider's Web is a play by crime writer Agatha Christie. Spider's Web, which premiered in London's West End in 1954, is Agatha Christie's second most successful play (744 performances), having run longer than Witness for the Prosecution, which premiered in 1953 (458 performances). It is surpassed only by Christie's record-breaking The Mousetrap, which has run continuously since opening in the West End in 1952.

== Background ==
Spider's Web was written at the request of its star, Margaret Lockwood, whose main body of work was in films and who had never appeared in a West End production aside from Peter Pan. In 1953, Lockwood asked her agent, Herbert de Leon, to speak with Sir Peter Saunders, who was the main producer of Christie's work on the stage after the successes of The Hollow and The Mousetrap, and see if Christie would be interested in writing a play for her.

Saunders arranged a meeting between Christie and Lockwood at the Mirabelle restaurant. During the conversation, Lockwood requested that she not play a sinister or wicked part again (for which she was well known) but a role in a "comedy thriller." She also requested a part for Wilfrid Hyde-White, with whom she wanted to act and who was also on the books of de Leon. In any event, although the part was written, Hyde-White declined the role and Sir Felix Aylmer was cast instead.

Christie wrote the play during the period of the final rehearsals for Witness for the Prosecution, which opened to rave reviews in London on 28 October 1953. Lockwood's character was given the name of Clarissa, the name of Christie's beloved mother who had died back in 1926. Unasked, Christie also wrote a role which would be suitable for Lockwood's fourteen-year-old daughter, Julia, although Margaret Barton played the part in the finished production.

Although the play is an original piece, within it Christie utilised four plot devices from earlier works she had written:

- In the play, Clarissa is offered the rental of the house in which she resides for only four guineas a month, whereas other inquirers are told the sum was eighteen guineas. This is to make sure that someone with the surname of Brown becomes resident to lure thieves to the house to steal something they think the real Mrs Brown possesses. This repeats the plot of the 1923 short story The Adventure of the Cheap Flat (published in book form in Poirot Investigates in 1924), where a couple called Robinson are cheaply let a flat so that they might act as unwitting decoys for two spies who are in fear of their lives and who were living under the alias of Mr and Mrs Robinson.
- The item the thieves are after is revealed to be a rare stamp which is on an envelope containing other pieces of paper which are thought, throughout the play, to be the real attraction of attempts at theft. This plot device was first used in the 1941 story The Case of the Buried Treasure, printed in book form in the US as Strange Jest in the 1950 collection Three Blind Mice and Other Stories and in the UK in the 1979 collection Miss Marple's Final Cases and Two Other Stories. In the short story, a deceased man has left his great-niece and nephew a supposedly hidden fortune which Miss Marple deduces is in the form of a rare stamp on one of his otherwise innocuous-looking letters.
- In the 1941 novel Evil Under the Sun, an adolescent girl experiments with witchcraft shortly before the victim is murdered, and then believes herself to be responsible for the murder
- The group's alibi of playing bridge all evening is ruined when the Inspector notices a playing card on the floor across the room from the bridge table. A full deck of cards is needed to properly play bridge. Therefore, the Inspector knows the group could not have been playing several consecutive hands of bridge that evening. This is similar to an attempted alibi in the short story "King of Clubs," which appears in 'Poirot's Early Cases'. A family claims that they have been playing bridge all night and therefore cannot be involved in a murder that has occurred in their neighbour's house. Poirot sees through this lie after he discovers that a card (the King of Clubs) is missing from the pack on the table. This discovery proves the family's alibi of playing bridge was false and they have lied about their whereabouts that evening.

The play opened at the Theatre Royal, Nottingham on 27 September 1954, followed by a short national tour and then had its West End opening on 13 December 1954 at the Savoy Theatre, where it ran for 774 performances. With The Mousetrap and Witness for the Prosecution still running, Christie was at the peak of her West End career.

On 7 March 1955, Queen Elizabeth II, Prince Philip and Princess Margaret were among the audience for a performance of the play.

== Synopsis ==
=== Act I ===
Clarissa Hailsham-Brown is a charming young woman with an active imagination, which she uses to entertain herself by imagining elaborate scenarios. As a result, she laments that people almost always believe her when she tells stories, but usually never when she tells the truth. She is the second wife of Henry, a Foreign Office diplomat, and stepmother to Pippa, Henry's twelve-year-old daughter. They are currently living at Copplestone Court, a large house in the countryside being rented to them for cheap. Three guests currently stay with them: Sir Rowland Delahaye, Clarissa's guardian in his fifties; Hugo Birch, an irascible man in his sixties and a local justice of the peace; and Jeremy Warrender, a charismatic young secretary.

One day, while alone in the drawing room, Jeremy hastily searches an antique desk until he is interrupted by the arrival of Mildred Peake, a hearty country woman who lives in a cottage on the estate as its gardener. She leaves, and Pippa arrives carrying an old "recipe book". She shows Jeremy a hidden door at the back of the room that opens into a small recess connected to the library. The three guests then prepare to leave for the nearby golf club, as the Elgins, Clarissa's butler and cook, are taking the night off. Clarissa tells Sir Rowland and Hugo that the house and its furnishings used to belong to Charles Sellon, a now-deceased antique dealer. Pippa reveals a secret drawer in the antique desk containing an envelope with the autographs of Queen Victoria, John Ruskin, and Robert Browning inside.

The guests leave for the golf club. Soon after, Oliver Costello, a drug dealer and the new husband of Henry's ex-wife Miranda, appears at the house and threatens to obtain custody of Pippa on Miranda's behalf. Clarissa accuses him of attempted blackmail just as Mr Elgin leaves the house. After Clarissa threatens to expose Costello and Miranda's drug activities, she has Miss Peake escort Costello off the grounds. Pippa, hysterical after seeing Costello, is sent upstairs.

Henry briefly stops by the house to inform Clarissa that he must fetch a foreign diplomat for a top-secret meeting. Costello sneaks into the drawing room and searches the desk, until the door of the hidden recess opens behind him and an unseen weapon clubs him down. Clarissa re-enters the room and finds his body; Pippa enters through the recess and hysterically confesses to the murder. Clarissa sends her to bed with a sleeping pill.

=== Act II, Scene 1 ===
The three guests return to find Clarissa setting up an in-progress game of bridge. Revealing Costello's body, she asks them to move it to Costello's car; the bridge game will serve as their alibi. Jeremy and Hugo reluctantly agree; after Clarissa privately tells Sir Rowland that Pippa admitted to the murder, Sir Rowland follows suit. As the guests start to move the body, the police suddenly arrive at the door, so they hastily hide it in the recess with the intention of moving it to the car later.

Police Inspector Lord explains that an anonymous caller reported a murder at the house. As the house used to be Mr Sellon's, who died at his shop under mysterious circumstances, the Inspector wishes to investigate thoroughly. There were suspicions that Sellon was involved in a drug ring, and he had left behind a note stating he had acquired an unknown item worth fourteen thousand pounds. The police locate Costello's car in the grounds, forcing Clarissa to admit to his visit, though she portrays it as amicable.

The Inspector summons Miss Peake after learning she personally showed Costello off the grounds. Miss Peake deduces that Costello must have been the murder victim, suspecting that one of the Elgins is responsible. Despite Clarissa's attempts to obfuscate it, Miss Peake reveals the hidden recess to the police. As she opens it, Costello's body falls out, sending Miss Peake into hysterics.

=== Act II, Scene 2 ===
The Inspector decides to question every person separately, piecing together an inconsistent timeline of the three guests' whereabouts and discovering evidence that both the drawing room and Costello's body were staged. When Sir Rowland is accused of assisting Clarissa with concealing the murder, he defends Clarissa's character and suggests that Costello's murder is linked to Sellon's drug activities.

As the Inspector is convinced Clarissa knowingly hid the body, Sir Rowland summons her to tell the police the truth. Clarissa tells the Inspector exactly what happened when she discovered the scene, but the style of her explanation makes the Inspector believe she is lying. Relenting, she confesses to the murder herself, claiming it was an act of self-defense. Questioned over Mr Elgin's testimony that he heard her say "blackmail", Clarissa claims the discussion was about the cheap rent for the house, though the Inspector does not believe her at first; an earlier investigation at the house indicated that the rent was absurdly high.

As the Inspector starts to walk Clarissa through her self-defense story in detail, he opens the recess door to find that Costello's body has disappeared.

=== Act III ===
While the police search the house and grounds for Costello's body, Miss Peake comes downstairs and confides in the residents that she removed the body from the recess via the library and hid it in her bed, believing Clarissa was responsible. Pippa returns from her room and produces a wax doll; her "recipe book" was a tome on witchcraft, and she thought she had killed Costello with a legitimate magic spell.

Clarissa suddenly recalls that Hugo had said the name of Sellon's antique shop: "Sellon and Brown". Recalling a handful of strange interactions at the house, Clarissa realizes that Miss Peake is actually Mrs Brown, Sellon's former partner. Miss Peake confirms her identity, explaining that the house was rented cheaply to Clarissa after Sellon died to install a different "Mrs Brown" for security.

Sir Rowland speculates that one of the autographs in the desk's secret drawer might be a forgery containing invisible ink. Testing them reveals the names of six drug distributors, including Costello. When the residents leave the room to inform the police, Jeremy hangs behind to smother Pippa, who fell asleep. Clarissa reappears, deducing that Jeremy is the killer. Jeremy confesses to the murders of both Costello and Sellon, revealing Sellon's mysterious asset: an extremely rare error stamp, posted on the envelope containing the autographs. Before Jeremy can kill Clarissa, the police enter the room and arrest him, tipped off by a suspicious Sir Rowland. They take him and Costello's recovered body away, and the guests retire to bed.

Henry returns without the foreign diplomat, but receives sudden news that he is on his way to the house. As Henry and Clarissa scramble to tidy the unkempt drawing room, Clarissa recounts the evening's events, though Henry thinks she is making them up. As he leaves to answer the doorbell, Clarissa decides to exit "mysteriously" into the hidden recess.

== Reception ==
Kenneth Tynan was a fan, writing in The Observer, "Those who grieve that our drama is a ritualistic art no longer should see Mrs. Christie's Spider’s Web and be consoled, for the detective play, in which a nameless avenger strikes down a chosen victim, is governed by conventions every bit as strict as those of Greek tragedy. Audiences who emerged from Witness for the Prosecution murmuring 'How clever she is!', will probably emerge from Spider’s Web murmuring 'How clever I am!'"

With 744 performances Spider’s Web clearly appealed to audiences—despite mixed reviews from some critics—as it enjoyed the longest first run of any Christie play apart from The Mousetrap. For instance The Times was not overly enthusiastic in its review of 15 December 1954 when it said, "Miss Agatha Christie tries this time to combine a story of murder with a comedy of character. As Edgar Wallace showed more than once, this thing can be done. There is no reason why the special tension of the one should not support the special tension of the other. In this instance, however, the support is at best intermittent. There is a risk that those that are chiefly concerned to find out who murdered the odious blackmailer will hardly regard the solution as one of the author's happiest. There is a like risk that the rest of the audience will be bored with a comedy which has to accommodate itself to the requirements of a long police interrogation. The common ground on which both sections may stand is dangerously small." The reviewer admitted that, "the thriller gives all the characters a turn and yet contrives at the end to produce a twist. It is a twist which surprises rather than satisfies the logical mind", but they concluded, "the play as a whole is the least exciting and not the most amusing of the three Agatha Christie's now running in London."

Alvin Klein, reviewing a 1997 production for The New York Times, fell for the play's inherent comedy and the appeal of its main character, saying "What sets Spider's Web apart from most specimens of its overstuffed genre, is that its real motive is fun; all else—dropped clues, plot contrivances—is secondary. And the Lady of Copplestone Court, Clarissa Hailsham-Brown, has a talent to amuse."

== Credits of London production ==
Director: Wallace Douglas

Cast of London production:

- Margaret Lockwood as Clarissa Hailsham-Brown
- Felix Aylmer as Sir Rowland Delahaye
- Harold Scott as Hugo Birch
- Myles Eason as Jeremy Warrender
- Margaret Barton as Pippa Hailsham-Brown, Clarissa's young stepdaughter
- Judith Furse as Mildred Peake
- Sidney Monckton as Elgin, the Butler
- Charles Morgan as Oliver Costello
- John Warwick as Henry Hailsham-Brown, Clarissa's husband
- Campbell Singer as Inspector Lord
- Desmond Llewelyn as Constable Jones

== Publication ==
The play was first published by Samuel French Ltd. in 1957 as French's Acting Edition No. 834.

== Novelisation ==
Like Black Coffee (1998) and The Unexpected Guest (1999), the script of the play was turned into a novel of the same name by Charles Osborne. It was published in the UK by HarperCollins in 2000.

== Film adaptations ==
=== 1955 TV adaptation ===
The play was adapted for BBC TV in 1955 starring Margaret Lockwood. Wallace Douglas directed. Lockwood would not reprise her performance in the feature film version.

==== Cast ====
- Margaret Lockwood as Clarissa Hailsham-Brown
- Felix Aylmer as Sir Rowland Delahaye
- Myles Eason as Jeremy Warrender
- Harold Scott as Hugo Birch
- Campbell Singer as Inspector Lord
- Desmond Llewelyn as Constable Jones
- Sidney Monckton as Elgin
- Judith Furse as Mildred Peake
- Charles Morgan as Oliver Costello

=== 1956 TV adaptation ===
The play was next adapted as a television movie aired in West Germany on 19 August 1956. This version was directed by Fritz Umgelter, and starred Marlies Schönau and Günter König.

=== 1960 film adaptation ===
In 1960, the play was turned into a film with the slightly extended title of The Spider's Web. Glynis Johns played the part of Clarissa with none of the actors from the stage production making the cross-over to the film. The screenplay, adapted from Christie's text, was by Eldon Howard and direction was by Godfrey Grayson.

=== 1982 TV adaptation ===
In 1982, the BBC produced the work as a one-hour-and-forty-five-minute television play which starred Penelope Keith in the role of Clarissa. Cedric Messina was the producer with Basil Coleman directing. This version was broadcast in December on BBC Two.

Cast of the 1982 BBC production:

- Penelope Keith – Clarissa Hailsham-Brown
- Robert Flemyng – Sir Rowland Delahaye
- Thorley Walters – Hugo Birch
- David Yelland – Jeremy Warrender
- Elizabeth Spriggs – Mildred Peake
- Jonathan Newth – Henry Hailsham-Brown
- Holly Aird – Pippa Hailsham-Brown
- Brian Protheroe – Oliver Costello
- John Barcroft – Inspector Lord
- Mark Draper – Sergeant Jones
- David Crosse – Elgin
- Lee Fox – Doctor
