= Rigby =

Rigby may refer to:

== People ==
- Amanda Rigby (born 1992), Indonesian actress
- Amy Rigby (born 1959), American singer-songwriter
- Beth Rigby (born 1976), British journalist
- Bob Rigby (born 1951), American soccer player
- Cam Rigby (born 1978), Australian basketball player
- Cathy Rigby (born 1952), American gymnast and actress
- Claude Rigby (1882–1960), Irish cricketer and radiologist
- Elizabeth Rigby, (1809–1893) later Lady Elizabeth Eastlake, British art historian
- Emma Rigby (born 1989), English actress
- Hannah Rigby (1794–1853), Australian convict
- Thomas Rigby (c. 1783–1841), a Welsh publican and barber
- Harry Rigby (producer) (1925–1985), American theatre producer and writer
- Harry Rigby (aviator) (1896–1972), Australian World War I flying ace
- Harry Rigby (footballer) (1878–1924), Australian rules footballer
- Jean Rigby (born 1954), English opera and concert singer
- John Rigby (artist) (1922–2012), Australian artist
- John Rigby (martyr) (died 1600), English Catholic martyr
- John Rigby (mathematician) (1933–2014), English mathematician and academic
- John Rigby (rower) (1906–1975), New Zealand rower
- Sir John Rigby (politician) (1834–1903), British lawyer and politician
- Jonathan Rigby (born 1963), English film critic and actor
- Kasha Rigby (1970–2024), American competitive skier
- Lee Rigby (1987–2013), British soldier and murder victim
- Lucy Rigby (born 1983), British politician
- Nicholas Rigby (c. 1800–1886), English catholic priest
- Thomas Rigby (c. 1783–1841), a Welsh publican and barber
- Norman Rigby (1923–2001), English footballer
- Paul Rigby (1924–2006), Australian cartoonist
- Sir Peter Rigby (born 1943), British entrepreneur and chairman of SCC
- Richard Rigby (1772–1848), British/Irish politician and businessman
- Terence Rigby (1937–2008), English actor
- Tim Rigby (politician), politician in Ontario, Canada
- Tim Rigby (sportscaster), American sports anchor from Pennsylvania
- Will Rigby (born 1956), American drummer, ex-husband of Amy
- William Charles Rigby (1834–1913), Australian bookseller

== Places ==
- Rigby, Idaho, U.S.
  - Rigby High School
- Rigby's La Plaza Historic District, Florida, U.S.

== Other ==
- .416 Rigby, a rifle cartridge
- John Rigby & Company, a manufacturer of firearms
- Rigby v Connol, a UK labour law case
- Rigby, a character in the animated television sitcom Regular Show
- Rigby (publisher)
- An imprint of Houghton Mifflin Harcourt
- Abbreviation for "Richard is great, but y'know..." used in Silicon Valley (TV series)
- Rigby Group, a British company

== See also ==
- Eleanor Rigby, Beatles song
- Eleanor Rigby (disambiguation)
- Rigsby (disambiguation)
- Rinkeby, a district in Stockholm, Sweden
