= Rigsby =

As a location, Rigsby may refer to:

- Rigsby, Lincolnshire
- Rigsby Islands, in the Antarctic

As a surname, Rigsby may refer to:

- Alex Rigsby (born 1992), American ice hockey goalkeeper
- Bruce Rigsby (1937–2022), American-Australian anthropologist
- Jim Rigsby (1923–1952), American race car driver
- Rigsby sisters, former insurance claim adjusters involved in a 21st-century U.S. court case
- House of Heroes, an American Christian band at one time including brothers Colin & Jared Rigsby

As a character name, Rigsby may refer to:

- Wayne Rigsby, a character in the 21st century police procedural The Mentalist
- Rupert Rigsby, a character in the 1970s comedy Rising Damp

== See also ==
- Rigby (disambiguation)
