= The Happiest Days of Your Life =

The Happiest Days of Your Life may refer to:

- The Happiest Days of Your Life (play), a 1947 farce by the English playwright John Dighton
- The Happiest Days of Your Life (film), a 1950 cinema adaptation of the stage play
