= Eleanor Rigby (disambiguation) =

"Eleanor Rigby" is a song by the Beatles.

Eleanor Rigby may also refer to:

- Eleanor Rigby (novel), a novel by Douglas Coupland
- Eleanor Rigby (statue), a statue in Liverpool, England

== See also ==
- The Disappearance of Eleanor Rigby, a 2013 film starring James McAvoy and Jessica Chastain
  - The Disappearance of Eleanor Rigby (soundtrack), the soundtrack album for the film
