= Harold Scott (actor) =

English actor (1891–1964)

- Scott in Trottie True (1949)
- Born: Harold Ernest Scott; 21 April 1891; Kensington, London, England
- Died: 15 April 1964 (aged 72); London, England
- Occupation: Actor
- Spouse: Florence Alice Mackey (m. 1917)

Harold Ernest Scott (21 April 1891 – 15 April 1964) was an English actor of stage and screen.

== Biography ==
Scott's stage work ran from the 1910s to the 1960s, and included the original West End productions of The Constant Nymph (1926–1927), Grand Hotel (1931–1932), Waters of the Moon (1951–1953) and Agatha Christie's Spider's Web (1954–1956).

His television appearances included The Children of the New Forest, ITV Television Playhouse, BBC Sunday Night Theatre, The New Adventures of Charlie Chan, The Diary of Samuel Pepys, William Tell, Armchair Theatre, Maigret, Dixon of Dock Green, The Avengers and Martin Chuzzlewit.

== Filmography ==
- The Water Gipsies (1932) as Mr Bell
- Discord (1933) as Harold
- Return of a Stranger (1937) as Peters
- Edward, My Son (1949) as Coppingham (uncredited)
- Trottie True (1949) as Mr True
- No Place for Jennifer (1950) as Man in underground
- The Woman with No Name (1950) as Waiter
- The 20 Questions Murder Mystery (1950) as Maurice Emery KC
- Stop the Merry-Go-Round (1952) as Man in pub
- Who Done it? (1956) as Scientist
- The Spanish Gardener (1956) as Pedro
- The Brides of Dracula (1960) as Severin (uncredited)
- The Hand (1960) as Charlie Taplow
- Clue of the Silver Key (1961) as Crow
- The Young Ones (1961) as Dench
- The Boys (1962) as Caldwell
- The Man Who Finally Died (1963) as Professor
- The Yellow Rolls-Royce (1964) as Taylor
