= State Farm Fire & Casualty Co. v. United States ex rel. Rigsby =

- Supreme Court of the United States

Argued November 1, 2016 Decided December 6, 2016
- Full case name: State Farm Fire and Casualty Company v. United States ex rel. Cori Rigsby, et al.
- Docket no.: 15-513
- Citations: 580 U.S. 26 (more) 137 S. Ct. 436; 196 L. Ed. 2d 340

Case history
- Prior: United States ex rel. Rigsby v. State Farm Fire & Cas. Co., 794 F.3d 457 (5th Cir. 2015); cert. granted, 136 S. Ct. 2386 (2016).

Holding
- A violation of the False Claim Act's seal requirement does not require the dismissal of a complaint.

Court membership
- Chief Justice John Roberts Associate Justices Anthony Kennedy · Clarence Thomas; Ruth Bader Ginsburg · Stephen Breyer; Samuel Alito · Sonia Sotomayor; Elena Kagan

Case opinion
- Majority: Kennedy, joined by unanimous

Laws applied
- False Claims Act

State Farm Fire & Casualty Co. v. United States ex rel. Rigsby, 580 U.S. 26 (2016), was a case in which the Supreme Court of the United States clarified the consequences of violating the False Claims Act's requirement that cases be kept under seal. In a unanimous opinion written by Justice Anthony Kennedy, the Court held that a violation of the False Claim Act's seal requirement does not require the dismissal of a complaint.

== Background ==
State Farm Fire and Casualty Company is an insurance company. Prior to 2005, State Farm offered two types (Note: The Supreme Court's opinion notes that State Farm offered more than two types of insurance policies at the time, but that the other types of insurance policies were not relevant for the purposes of this case.) of insurance policies to homeowners: flood insurance, which would be reimbursed by the federal government's National Flood Insurance Program, and general homeowner insurance, which would be paid directly by State Farm. After Hurricane Katrina, a State Farm contractor instructed its insurance adjusters to falsely classify wind damage as flood damage so that the federal government, rather than State Farm, would assume liability for the insurance. In 2006, two of these former State Farm claims adjusters, the Rigsby sisters, filed a qui tam suit against State Farm under the False Claims Act. The Act required that the complaint against State Farm be kept secret (under seal) for at least 60 days. While the case was still under seal, the adjusters' attorney disclosed the existence of the complaint to journalists at ABC, the Associated Press, and The New York Times. (Note: The attorney who disclosed this information withdrew from the case in 2008 for unrelated reasons.) State Farm then filed a motion to dismiss based on the theory that the adjusters violated the False Claims Act's seal requirement, but the District Court denied the motion and the adjusters ultimately won at trial. State Farm filed an appeal in the United States Court of Appeals for the Fifth Circuit, but the Fifth Circuit affirmed the District Court's ruling on the seal violations. State Farm filed another appeal to the Supreme Court of the United States, which granted certiorari in 2016.

== Opinion of the Court ==
In a unanimous opinion written by Justice Anthony Kennedy, the Supreme Court affirmed the Fifth Circuit's ruling and held that a violation of the False Claim Act's seal requirement does not require dismissal of a complaint. Justice Kennedy explained that the False Claims Act did not specify a remedy for violations of the seal requirement, but that the structure of the act indicates that dismissal is not required when parties violate the seal requirement. He stated that "had Congress intended to require dismissal for a violation of the seal requirement, it would have said so." Furthermore, Justice Kennedy stated that monetary penalties or other forms of attorney discipline were still available to sanction and deter future seal violations.

== Commentary and analysis ==
Writing for The National Law Review, Evan Panich noted that "the Court made no definitive ruling" about the kinds of sanctions that would be sufficient to deter future violations of the Act's seal requirement. In his analysis of the case for SCOTUSblog, Ronald Mann commented that "the dominant feature of the court’s quick, unanimous resolution of the case is an overt avoidance of any specific articulation of standards for use by the lower courts." National Public Radio correspondent Nina Totenberg wrote that this case was the "first of many" lawsuits alleging that State Farm "evaded its responsibility by manipulating the reports of its own adjusters and engineers."

== See also ==
- List of United States Supreme Court cases
- Lists of United States Supreme Court cases by volume
- List of United States Supreme Court cases by the Roberts Court
