= The Rough and the Smooth =

1959 British film by Robert Siodmak

- Directed by: Robert Siodmak
- Written by: Robin Maugham (novel); Audrey Erskine Lindop; Dudley Leslie
- Produced by: George Minter; Robert Siodmak
- Starring: Nadja Tiller; Tony Britton; William Bendix; Natasha Parry
- Cinematography: Otto Heller
- Edited by: Gordon Pilkington
- Music by: Douglas Gamley
- Production company: George Minter Productions
- Distributed by: Renown Pictures
- Release date: October 1959
- Running time: 96 minutes
- Country: United Kingdom
- Language: English

The Rough and the Smooth (U.S. title: Portrait of a Sinner) is a 1959 British drama film directed by Robert Siodmak and starring Nadja Tiller, Tony Britton, William Bendix, and Natasha Parry. It was written by Robin Maugham, Audrey Erskine Lindop, and Dudley Leslie, based on the 1951 novel of the same title by Maugham.

It was distributed in Germany by Gloria Film. In 1961 it was given an American release by American International Pictures.

The screenplay concerns an archaeologist who has an affair with a German woman, putting his engagement to another woman in jeopardy.

== Plot ==
In late 1950s London, an upper-class archaeologist, Mike Thompson, has trouble getting a taxi, so asks to share one already on hire to a beautiful German woman, Ila Hansen, and although wary she eventually agrees. When by chance he sees her again later, they embark on a torrid love affair which threatens to ruin his long-term relationship with his fiancée, Margaret Goreham, and his career prospects dependent upon her rich, titled uncle.

== Cast ==
- Nadja Tiller as Ila Hansen
- Tony Britton as Mike Thompson
- William Bendix as Reg Barker
- Natasha Parry as Margaret Goreham
- Norman Wooland as David Fraser
- Donald Wolfit as Lord Drewell
- Tony Wright as Jack
- Adrienne Corri as Jane Buller
- Joyce Carey as Mrs. Thompson
- John Welsh as Dr. Thompson
- Martin Miller as Piggy
- Michael Ward as head waiter
- Edward Chapman as Willy Catch
- Norman Pierce as Barman
- Beatrice Varley as hotel manageress
- Myles Eason as Bobby Montagu-Jones
- Cyril Smith as taxi driver
- Geoffrey Bayldon as Ransom

== Production ==
The film was shot at the MGM-British Studios and on location around London.

== Reception ==
=== Critical ===
The Monthly Film Bulletin wrote: "For two-thirds of this film there is no sign of any plot nor, when a hint of a story does emerge, does it seem to have been worth waiting for. The script is never even on nodding terms with life, and tries to make up for this deficiency by a candidly explosive vocabulary which gives the production a weirdly old-fashioned air. Of the principals, only Tony Britton attempts to make something of the preposterous dialogue, though Donald Wolfit's newspaper tycoon provides a few precious moments. Apart from some rather arty lighting and photography, Siodmak's flat direction offers little hint of any enthusiasm for the subject. Perhaps he was not at home in the English scene."

Variety wrote: "Aiming to offer the kind of torrid, adult love scene that helped make Room At The Top such a success not only at home but in the U.S, The Rough And The Smooth is a story of passion and betrayal. It makes as frequent use as the situations allow of the fireside settee and the bedroom. And when it does employ these settings, it oft-times breeds an atmosphere of sex that's as powerful as any to emanate from British studios. The trouble with this pic is that it presents the love stuff in the course of a story that, one feels, could almost have been drummed up for that purpose alone. With characterization, too, suffering distortion for the sake of dramatic revelations when the climax is looming, the result is often unsatisfactory."

=== Box office ===
According to Kinematograph Weekly the film performed "better than average" at the British box office in 1959.
