= Lee v Showmen's Guild of GB =

- Court: Court of Appeal
- Citation: [1952] 2 QB 329

Keywords
- Contract of employment, terms

Lee v Showmen's Guild of Great Britain [1952] 2 QB 329 is a UK labour law case, concerning the construction of terms in a contract of employment.

== Facts ==
Frank Lee was expelled from the Showmen's Guild after refusing to respect the outcome of a dispute over place at a fairground. He had been given a spot, for his roundabout show called Noah's Ark, by a local corporation, but the guild decided it should be reallocated to another member, Shaw, who had the site before the war. In 1948, they both arrived at the same spot, and got into an argument. When the dispute was heard, the guild imposed a fine on Lee. He refused to pay, and was expelled from the guild. He alleged that this prevented him from earning a living and so sought an injunction.

Ormerod J granted an injunction against the expulsion, holding that there was no breach of the relevant rule, because no conduct had amounted to unfair competition. The committee's decision was wrong in law, ultra vires and void.

== Judgment ==
The Court of Appeal held that Frank Lee should not have been expelled, because the committee had acted outside the rules of the union. Somervell LJ gave a judgment upholding the injunction.

Denning LJ gave the following concurring judgment.

The jurisdiction of a domestic tribunal, such as the committee of the Showmen's Guild, must be founded on a contract, express or implied. Outside the regular courts of this country, no set of men can sit in judgment on their fellows except so far as Parliament authorizes it or the parties agree to it. The jurisdiction of the committee of the Showmen's Guild is contained in a written set of rules to which all the members subscribe. This set of rules contains the contract between the members and is just as much subject to the jurisdiction of these courts as any other contract.

It was once said by Sir George Jessel M.R. that the courts only intervened in these cases to protect rights of property: see Rigby v Connol; and other judges have often said the same thing: see, for instance, Cookson v Harewood. But Fletcher Moulton L.J. denied that there was any such limitation on the power of the courts: see Osborne v Amalgamated Society of Railway Servants; and it has now become clear that he was right: see the comporters' case, Abbott v Sullivan. That case shows that the power of this court to intervene is founded on its jurisdiction to protect rights of contract. If a member is expelled by a committee in breach of contract, this court will grant a declaration that their action is ultra vires. It will also grant an injunction to prevent his expulsion if that is necessary to protect a proprietary right of his; or to protect him in his right to earn his livelihood: see Amalgamated Society of Carpenters, etc. v Braithwaite; but it will not grant an injunction to give a member the right to enter a social club, unless there are proprietary rights attached to it, because it is too personal to be specifically enforced: see Baird v Wells. That is, I think, the only relevance of rights of property in this connexion. It goes to the form of remedy, not to the right.

Although the jurisdiction of a domestic tribunal is founded on contract, express or implied, nevertheless the parties are not free to make any contract they like. There are important limitations imposed by public policy. The tribunal must, for instance, observe the principles of natural justice. They must give the man notice of the charge and a reasonable opportunity of meeting it. Any stipulation to the contrary would be invalid. They cannot stipulate for a power to condemn a man unheard. That appears, I think, from the judgments of Brett L.J. in Dawkins v Antrobus, of Kelly C.B. in Wood v Woad, and of Lord Birkenhead L.C. in Weinberger v Inglis, which are to be preferred to the dictum of Maugham J. in Maclean v The Workers' Union to the contrary. Another limitation arises out of the well-known principle that parties cannot by contract oust the ordinary courts from their jurisdiction: see Scott v Avery, per Alderson B. and Lord Cranworth L.C. They can, of course, agree to leave questions of law, as well as questions of fact, to the decision of the domestic tribunal. They can, indeed, make the tribunal the final arbiter on questions of fact, but they cannot make it the final arbiter on questions of law. They cannot prevent its decisions being examined by the courts. If parties should seek, by agreement, to take the law out of the hands of the courts and put it into the hands of a private tribunal, without any recourse at all to the courts in case of error of law, then the agreement is to that extent contrary to public policy and void: see Czarnikow & Co. Ld. v Roth, Schmidt & Co., In re Raven and In re Wynn.

The question in this case is: to what extent will the courts examine the decisions of domestic tribunals on points of law? This is a new question which is not to be solved by turning to the club cases. In the case of social clubs, the rules usually empower the committee to expel a member who, in their opinion, has been guilty of conduct detrimental to the club; and this is a matter of opinion and nothing else. The courts have no wish to sit on appeal from their decisions on such a matter any more than from the decisions of a family conference. They have nothing to do with social rights or social duties. On any expulsion they will see that there is fair play. They will see that the man has notice of the charge and a reasonable opportunity of being heard. They will see that the committee observe the procedure laid down by the rules; but they will not otherwise interfere: see Labouchere v Earl of Wharncliffe and Dawkins v Antrobus.

It is very different with domestic tribunals which sit in judgment on the members of a trade or profession. They wield powers as great as, if not greater than, any exercised by the courts of law. They can deprive a man of his livelihood. They can ban him from the trade in which he has spent his life and which is the only trade he knows. They are usually empowered to do this for any breach of their rules, which, be it noted, are rules which they impose and which he has no real opportunity of accepting or rejecting. In theory their powers are based on contract. The man is supposed to have contracted to give them these great powers; but in practice he has no choice in the matter. If he is to engage in the trade, he has to submit to the rules promulgated by the committee. Is such a tribunal to be treated by these courts on the same footing as a social club? I say no. A man's right to work is just as important to him as, if not more important than, his rights of property. These courts intervene every day to protect rights of property. They must also intervene to protect the right to work.

But the question still remains: to what extent will the courts intervene? They will, I think, always be prepared to examine the decision to see that the tribunal has observed the law. This includes the correct interpretation of the rules. Let me give an illustration. If a domestic tribunal is given power by the rules to expel a member for misconduct, such as here for "unfair competition," does that mean that the tribunal is the sole judge of what constitutes unfair competition? Suppose it puts an entirely wrong construction on the words "unfair competition" and finds a member guilty of it when no reasonable person could so find, has not the man a remedy? I think that he has, for the simple reason that he has only agreed to the committee exercising jurisdiction according to the true interpretation of the rules, and not according to a wrong interpretation. Take this very case. If the man is found guilty of unfair competition, the committee can impose a fine on him of a sum up to £250. Then if he has not the money to pay, or, at any rate, does not pay, within one month, the man automatically ceases to be a member of the guild: see rule 14. To be deprived of membership in this way is a very severe penalty on a man. It means that he will be excluded from all the fairgrounds of the country which are controlled by the guild or its members: see rules 11 (g) (ii) and 15 (a). This is a serious encroachment on his right to earn a livelihood, and it is, I think, not to be permitted unless justified by the contract into which he has entered. The courts have never allowed a master to dismiss a servant except in accordance with the terms of the contract between them. So also they cannot permit a domestic tribunal to deprive a member of his livelihood or to injure him in it, unless the contract, on its true construction, gives the tribunal power to do so.

I repeat "on its true construction," because I desire to emphasize that the true construction of the contract is to be decided by the courts and by no one else. Sir Frank Soskice argued that it was for the committee of the guild to construe the rules, and that, so long as they put an honest construction on them, their construction was binding on the members, even though it was a wrong construction. I cannot agree with that contention. The rules are the contract between the members. The committee cannot extend their jurisdiction by giving a wrong interpretation to the contract, no matter how honest they may be. They have only such jurisdiction as the contract on its true interpretation confers on them, not what they think it confers. The scope of their jurisdiction is a matter for the courts, and not for the parties, let alone for one of them. That is how the House of Lords approached the problem in the Carpenters' case, and I think that we should follow their example.

In most of the cases which come before such a domestic tribunal the task of the committee can be divided into two parts: firstly, they must construe the rules; secondly, they must apply the rules to the facts. The first is a question of law which they must answer correctly if they are to keep within their jurisdiction; the second is a question of fact which is essentially a matter for them. The whole point of giving jurisdiction to a committee is so that they can determine the facts and decide what is to be done about them. The two parts of the task are, however, often inextricably mixed together. The construction of the rules is so bound up with the application of the rules to the facts that no one can tell one from the other. When that happens, the question whether the committee has acted within its jurisdiction depends, in my opinion, on whether the facts adduced before them were reasonably capable of being held to be a breach of the rules. If they were, then the proper inference is that the committee correctly construed the rules and have acted within their jurisdiction. If, however, the facts were not reasonably capable of being held to be a breach, and yet the committee held them to be a breach, then the only inference is that the committee have misconstrued the rules and exceeded their jurisdiction. The proposition is sometimes stated in the form that the court can interfere if there was no evidence to support the finding of the committee; but that only means that the facts were not reasonably capable of supporting the finding.

We were referred to a number of cases on statutory tribunals. These are not directly in point, because a statute can, expressly or by implication, exclude the jurisdiction of the courts, whereas parties cannot do so. Nevertheless, in cases where the jurisdiction is not excluded, the courts have intervened on the same principles as I have mentioned. The cases show that, although Parliament has given a tribunal power to deprive a man of his livelihood for a particular cause, nevertheless the courts will intervene if there is a real substantial miscarriage of justice with regard to him; and they will hold that there is a miscarriage of justice if the facts adduced before the tribunal are not reasonably capable of supporting the charge made against him. Thus where an Act stated that a tribunal might remove a registrar for "any cause which may appear reasonable to the tribunal," all the judges were of opinion that the courts would take care to see that the cause was a real and substantial cause. There must, it was held, be sufficient evidence to go to a jury on it: see Osgood v Nelson. So, also, when the General Medical Council were empowered to remove a medical man for "infamous conduct," it was held by this court that the facts before them must be reasonably capable of being so considered: see per Lord Esher in Allinson v General Council of Medical Education and Registration. It has sometimes been said in these cases that absence of evidence is not itself a ground for the intervention of the court, but only goes to show bad faith in the tribunal: see Leeson v General Council of Medical Education and Registration and Maclean v The Workers' Union; but I do not think that those statements can stand in the light of Osgood v Nelson, which was not cited to the court in either case.

Those cases, it is true, concerned statutory tribunals, but I see no reason why the powers of the court to intervene should be any less in the case of domestic tribunals. In each case it is a question of interpretation, in the one of a statute, in the other of the rules, to see whether the tribunal has observed the law. In the case of statutory tribunals, the injured party has a remedy by certiorari, and also a remedy by declaration and injunction. The remedy by certiorari does not lie to domestic tribunals, but the remedy by declaration and injunction does lie, and it can be as effective as, if not more effective than, certiorari. It is, indeed, more effective, because it is not subject to the limitation that the error must appear on the face of the record.

My conclusion, therefore, is that the court has power in this case to intervene in the decision of the committee of the Showmen's Guild if no facts were adduced before them which could reasonably be considered to be "unfair competition" within rule 15 (c), which says that "no member of the guild shall indulge in unfair competition with regard to the renting, taking, or letting of ground or position." The facts are not in dispute. In May, 1949, the plaintiff and Shaw applied to the Bradford Corporation for a site on the fair ground for the Bradford Moor Fair. No allocations were made by the corporation before the two showmen arrived on the ground; but when they got there, the best position was allotted to the plaintiff. Shaw then claimed that, in accordance with a previous ruling of the guild, he was entitled to the position. The corporation thought that the plaintiff was entitled to it, but they were quite ready to allow the showmen to decide between themselves: but the plaintiff said that, as the corporation had allotted it to him, he was going to stand on it. The judge held that there was nothing of "unfair competition" in the plaintiff's conduct, and I agree with him. It may have been very reprehensible of him not to abide by the previous ruling of the guild. He should have given way to Shaw: but he can hardly be said to have been guilty of unfair competition. There was no undercutting or anything of that sort. He only accepted the position allotted to him and stood on it. Inasmuch as the facts are not reasonably capable of being "unfair competition" it follows that the committee had no jurisdiction to find him guilty of it.

There was another charge suggested, though not clearly made, against the plaintiff - namely, that he failed to observe the previous ruling of the committee which had awarded the site to Shaw. That ruling had been given in June, 1948, under rule 26 of the rules of 1948 and if that rule had been in existence in 1949, it may be that the plaintiff could have been found guilty of evading it. But it was not in existence in 1949. It had been repealed, and it is difficult to see how the plaintiff could be guilty of evading a rule which had ceased to exist. That was, no doubt, the reason why he was not charged with evading it.

The only real question before us is whether, on the admitted facts, the plaintiff could properly be found guilty of "unfair competition" within rule 15 (c). I agree with the judge that he could not. I would therefore dismiss the appeal.

== See also ==
- UK labour law
