= Spider's Web (novel) =

2000 English crime fiction novel by Australian Charles Osborne

- Dust-jacket illustration of the first UK edition
- Author: Agatha Christie
- Cover artist: Not known
- Language: English
- Genre: Crime novel
- Publisher: HarperCollins
- Publication date: September 2000
- Publication place: United Kingdom
- Media type: Print (Hardback & Paperback)
- Pages: 250 pp (first edition, hardback)
- ISBN: 0-00-226198-7
- OCLC: 43820679

Spider's Web is a novelization by Charles Osborne of the 1954 play of the same name by crime fiction writer Agatha Christie and was first published in the UK by HarperCollins in September 2000 and on November 11, 2000, in the US by St. Martin's Press.

The book was written following the successful publication of the novelizations of the 1930 play Black Coffee in 1998 and the 1958 play The Unexpected Guest in 1999. Like those books, the novelization is a straightforward transfer of the stage lines and directions of Christie's script into a written narrative. Osborne chose not to add characters, lines or scenes which would alter in any substantial way what had been presented on the stage although minor amendments were made to produce suitable chapter endings.

Osborne contributed a section to the book on the history of Christie's plays.

== Plot ==
Clarissa Hailsham-Brown is the wife of a foreign diplomat Henry. There are three guests in the house – her godfather Sir Rowland "Roly" Delahaye, Hugo Birch and a young man named Jeremy Warrender. When Jeremy is given the opportunity of being alone with Clarissa, he confesses his love for her. But Clarissa, taking her duties of being a faithful wife to Henry and a step mother to Pippa, rejects his proposal. Later when Pippa returns from school she indulges herself in exploring parts of the manor house with Jeremy and reveals a secret passage.

The three guests then make their departure to the local golf club. Meanwhile, Clarissa is confronted by a visitor to the house, a man named Oliver Costello, who happens to be Pippa's mother's second husband as well as a drug addict. He states that in future Pippa will have to stay with her mother. He leaves the house and is escorted off by Miss Peake, the manor house's gardener. A few minutes later Henry Hailsham-Brown arrives home and innocently reveals the intended secret arrival of the Soviet Premier in London. He has to go and meet him at the local airport and will return later.

The room empties and Costello is seen sneaking around the living room. Clarissa soon discovers his body in the drawing-room. It is believed that Pippa has killed him with a golf club in desperation and dilemma. Clarissa devises a plan with the three returning guests to dispose of the body. Unfortunately, before they can dispose of the body, the police arrive and say that they have had an anonymous phone call, suggesting that a murder has taken place at the house. When questioned, Clarissa and the guests all lie about the facts, hoping to cover up the murder that it is thought that Pippa has committed. Clarissa on being asked to tell the truth, changes her story a number of times and gets herself entangled in a 'spider's web'. The police soon find that Costello's body is missing. It was taken by Miss Peake to an upper bedroom so that the police wouldn't come across it while they searched the house, and the individuals are interviewed.

Later, when Jeremy is alone, in an attempt in pretending to comfort Pippa, he tries to smother her with a pillow, but stops as Clarissa approaches him. Clarissa, who is keen and acute at understanding things, discovers that it is Jeremy who had murdered Charles Sellon, an antique shop owner and the previous owner of the manor house, because he had something valuable in his possession. The item which Jeremy has been looking for, is somewhere in the house and not the antique shop. That was why Costello approached Clarissa, thinking that she was Mrs Brown, the owner of the manor house and the partner in his antique shop business. It is then revealed that Miss Peake is Mrs Brown (Clarissa is Mrs Hailsham-Brown). Since Jeremy was on the same mission as Costello, Costello had to be eliminated. The item which the rogues have been searching for is a postage stamp, which would have fetched the sum of £14,000. Jeremy tries to kill Clarissa as she is the only one remaining who knows his secret. However, the police are eavesdropping on them and arrest him. The three guests leave and Henry returns home. Clarissa learns that the Premier was not at the airport as part of a security set up, but is still expected to visit the house. The play closes as Clarissa and Henry get ready for the visit of the Premier.
