= Black Coffee (play) =

1930 play by Agatha Christie

- Original language: English
- Written by: Agatha Christie

Premiere
- Date: 8 December 1930
- Place: United Kingdom

Black Coffee is a play by the British crime-fiction author Agatha Christie which was produced initially in 1930, but not published until 1934. The first piece that Christie wrote for the stage, it launched a successful second career for her as a playwright. In the play, a scientist discovers that someone in his household has stolen the formula for an explosive. The scientist calls Hercule Poirot to investigate, but is murdered just as Poirot arrives with Hastings and Inspector Japp.

The successful play was adapted as a film in 1931, but the film is now believed to be lost. In 1998, 22 years after Christie's death, it was re-published in the United Kingdom and the United States in the form of a novel. The novelisation was undertaken by the Australian writer and classical music critic Charles Osborne, with the endorsement of the Christie estate.

== Writing and production ==
Agatha Christie began writing Black Coffee in 1929, feeling disappointed with the portrayal of Hercule Poirot in the previous year's play Alibi, and being equally dissatisfied with the motion-picture adaptations of her short story The Coming of Mr. Quin and her novel The Secret Adversary as The Passing of Mr. Quin and Die Abenteurer GmbH. According to the foreword to the current HarperCollins edition of Black Coffee in its novelised form, she finished writing the play in late 1929.

She mentions Black Coffee in her 1977 life story, Autobiography, describing it as "a conventional spy thriller ... full of cliches, it was, I think, not at all bad". Nonetheless, her literary agents had advised her to forget the play entirely and she was willing to do so until a friend connected with the theatre suggested that it might be worth producing.

Christie wrote in her autobiography that the debut performance of Black Coffee took place at the Everyman Theatre in Hampstead. However, no record exists of such a staging and she was undoubtedly confusing it with the true opening production at the Embassy Theatre in Swiss Cottage (now London's Central School of Speech and Drama) on 8 December 1930. The production ran in that theatre only until 20 December. On 9 April 1931 it re-opened at the St Martin's Theatre (later to be the second home of Christie's most enduring stage work The Mousetrap), where it ran until 1 May before transferring to the Wimbledon Theatre on 4 May. It then went to the Little Theatre on 11 May, finally closing there on 13 June 1931.

Poirot was played initially by the well-known character actor Francis L. Sullivan who became a good friend of the author. She approved of his portrayal despite the fact that physically he was far too tall for the dapper little Belgian detective. (Sullivan stood six feet, two inches in height.) Also in the premiere cast was (Sir) Donald Wolfit, playing Dr. Carelli. Wolfit would become renowned in England as an actor-manager, best remembered for his vivid interpretations of Shakespearean roles and other big-scale classical parts. John Boxer played Captain Hastings and Richard Fisher Inspector Japp.

Unlike most other Christie plays, Black Coffee did not transfer to the New York stage.

== Plot ==
Cover of the first UK edition of the Charles Osborne novelisation

Scientist Sir Claud Amory is developing a formula for a new type of atomic explosive. He discovers that the envelope containing the formula has been stolen from his safe, and summons Hercule Poirot to investigate. While waiting for Poirot to arrive, Sir Claud gathers the members of his household as they convene in the drawing room after dinner for coffee: his sister Caroline, his niece Barbara, his son Richard, Richard's Italian wife Lucia, his secretary Edward Raynor, and Lucia's old friend Dr. Carelli. Sir Claud, having ordered all the doors to the room locked, reveals the theft and Poirot's imminent arrival to the group. He proposes a deal: the lights in the room will be turned out, and if the stolen envelope is left in front of him, he will declare the case resolved; otherwise, he will allow Poirot to investigate.

After the lights return, the envelope is found placed in front of Sir Claud as Poirot arrives. However, Sir Claud is now dead in his chair, apparently of a heart attack, and the envelope is empty. Lucia implores Poirot to investigate, but Richard reminds her that Sir Claud had mentioned that his coffee tasted bitter. Over private interrogations with the family, Poirot deduces that Sir Claud's coffee was poisoned with hyoscine from a box of wartime medical supplies left in the house, which multiple members of the family had interacted with prior to his death, and that the formula must still be somewhere in the room.

Poirot discovers a duplicate key to the safe and is provided with an anonymous letter sent to Sir Claud warning him against associating with "Selma Goetz and her brood". Selma Goetz, a notorious international spy with whom Poirot is familiar, died recently in Italy, leaving behind a daughter who subsequently vanished. Poirot privately summons Lucia and tricks her into revealing that she is Selma Goetz's daughter. Lucia confesses that Carelli was blackmailing her and had ordered her to steal the formula, providing her with the duplicate safe key. Instead of performing the theft, Lucia poisoned her own coffee with hyoscine, intending to commit suicide before Richard discovered her secret, but Sir Claud died before she had the chance. In a fit of hysteria, Lucia admits to murdering Sir Claud, but Poirot reveals that he had seen her switch the cup of coffee left in front of Sir Claud's corpse with an untainted cup, deducing that she believes Richard had stolen the formula to settle his debts and subsequently poisoned Sir Claud. Poirot swears that he will prove both Lucia and Richard innocent, just as the police arrive.

Carelli attempts to flee the house, but is caught by Inspector Japp, who identifies him as a wanted criminal. The family is summoned, and Lucia confesses her identity to the group as well as Carelli's blackmail plot, accusing him of the theft. After Carelli is arrested, Richard attempts to confess to the murder himself, suspecting Lucia is the true culprit. Poirot advises Richard to announce he will retire from the house while the investigation is ongoing, then reveals his deductions to Captain Hastings: Sir Claud must have already been poisoned before gathering the family, and the murderer, caught off-guard by Sir Claud's discovery of the theft, was forced to hide the formula while the lights were out; they will likely return for it with Richard absent. Based on an errant comment from Hastings, Poirot discovers the formula torn into pieces inside a spill vase he has been habitually straightening. Poirot re-hides the formula and sends Hastings out with a note for Inspector Japp just as Raynor enters the room. At Poirot's suggestion, Raynor pours them both glasses of whiskey. Poirot accuses Raynor of the theft and murder, to which Raynor readily admits, before revealing he has also poisoned Poirot's whiskey. Poirot collapses into a chair and appears dead, but as Raynor leaves with the formula in hand, he is apprehended by Japp. Poirot revives completely and reveals he had Hastings prepare a duplicate whiskey glass, which he swapped with Poirot's poisoned glass when Raynor was not looking. After Raynor is arrested, Poirot reunites Richard and Lucia and reveals to them each other's attempts to save the other by accusing themselves. Richard and Lucia reconcile and Poirot departs, pausing to straighten the spill vase again.

== Reception ==
The Times reviewed the work in its issue of 9 December 1930, saying that, "Mrs Christie steers her play with much dexterity; yet there are times when it is perilously near the doldrums. Always it is saved by Hercule Poirot, the great French [sic] detective, who theorizes with the gusto of a man for whom the visible world hardly exists. He carries us with him, for he does not take himself too seriously, and he salts his shrewdness with wit. For a ruthless investigator he is an arrant sentimentalist; but that is one of the ways in which Mrs Christie prevents her problem from becoming tedious. Mr Sullivan is obviously very happy in the part, and his contribution to the evening's entertainment is a considerable one. Mr Boxer Watsonizes pleasantly, and Miss Joyce Bland, as a young lady who must wait until the very end before knowing a moment's happiness, contrives to excite our sympathy for her distress. The remainder of the cast is rather serviceable than exciting."

The Observer's issue of 14 December 1930 contained a review by "HH" in which he concluded that, "Miss Agatha Christie is a competent craftsman, and her play, which is methodically planned and well carried out and played, agreeably entertains."

The Guardian reviewed the play in its issue of 10 April 1931. The reviewer stated that, "Miss Christie knows the ropes, keeps to the track, sets her Herculean protector in defence of innocence, and unmasks the real villain at eleven o’clock. One must be something of a ritualist to find enchantment in such matters. Mr. Francis Sullivan makes a large, guttural, amiable sleuth of the sagacious Hercules [sic]. He is wise not to imitate Mr. Charles Laughton who gave us such a brilliant study of the Belgian some time ago. He makes his own portrait and does it with a competent hand." The reviewer praised others in the cast by name and concluded, "the company conduct themselves with a proper sense of the ceremonial involved in a detective play. But it is surely permissible to be surprised that adult people can be found in fairly large numbers to sit undismayed through the execution of such ritual as this."

Two days later, Ivor Brown reviewed this second production in The Observer when he said that, "If you are one of those playgoers who are eternally excited by a corpse in the library and cross-examination of the family, all is well. If not, not. To me the progress of detection seemed rather heavy going, but I start with some antipathy to murdered scientists and their coveted formulae. Black coffee is supposed to be a strong stimulant and powerful enemy of sleep. I found the title optimistic. "

The Times reviewed the play again when it opened at the Little Theatre in its issue of 13 May 1931. This time it said that, "Its false scents are made for the triumph of the omniscient Belgian detective, complete according to the best tradition with unintelligent foil; and if they appear sometimes to be manufactured with a little too much determination and to be revived when they seem most likely to be dissipated, they may be allowed because they just succeed in maintaining our sympathy with distressed beauty and our interest in the solution of a problem. Though much of the dialogue is stilted, the complacent detective has an engaging manner."

== Credits of London production ==
The director was André van Gyseghem.

=== Cast of December 1930 production ===
- Francis L. Sullivan as Hercule Poirot
- Donald Wolfit as Dr. Carelli
- Josephine Middleton as Miss Caroline Amory
- Joyce Bland as Lucia Amory
- Lawrence Hardman as Richard Amory
- Judith Menteath as Barbara Amory
- André van Gyseghem as Edward Raynor
- Wallace Evennett as Sir Claud Amory
- John Boxer as Captain Arthur Hastings
- Richard Fisher as Inspector Japp

=== Cast of 1931 production ===
- Francis L. Sullivan as Hercule Poirot
- Josephine Middleton as Miss Caroline Amory
- Dino Galvani as Dr. Carelli
- Jane Milligan as Lucia Amory
- Randolph McLeod as Richard Amory
- Renee Gadd as Barbara Amory
- Walter Fitzgerald as Edward Raynor
- E. Vivian Reynolds as Sir Claud Amory
- Roland Culver as Captain Arthur Hastings
- Neville Brook as Inspector Japp

== Adaptations ==
Poster for the 1931 film

=== 1931 film ===
The play was adapted into the film Black Coffee, in 1931, with Austin Trevor in the role of Poirot. Running to 78 minutes, the motion picture was produced by Julius S. Hagan and released on 19 August 1931 by Twickenham Film Studios. This was one of three appearances that Trevor made as Poirot, having also appeared in Alibi (1931) and Lord Edgware Dies (1934). It is now considered a lost film.

=== Novel ===
Like The Unexpected Guest (1999) and Spider's Web, the script of the play was turned into a novel by Charles Osborne. The novelisation was copyrighted in 1997 and published in 1998. Kirkus Reviews called it "pleasantly serviceable" with a "suitably genteel" atmosphere. Publishers Weekly deemed it a "welcome addition to the Christie canon."
