= Rigby v Connol =

British legal case

- Court: Court of Appeal
- Citation: (1880) 4 Ch D 482

Keywords
- Union membership, expulsion

Rigby v Connol (1880) 4 Ch D 482 is a UK labour law case, concerning the right of a union member not to be expelled. It is no longer good law, having been superseded by Lee v The Showmen’s Guild of Great Britain and the Trade Union and Labour Relations (Consolidation) Act 1992.

== Facts ==
Rigby wanted a declaration and injunction to prevent his expulsion from a union that operated a closed shop. The rules of the "Journeymen Hatters' Fair Trade Union of Great Britain and Ireland", registered under the Trade Union Act 1871, said any journeyman whose son worked for a ‘foul shop’ (one where non-union workers were employed) would be fined £5 and entitled to no union benefits until the fine was paid. Rigby broke the rule and was expelled.

== Judgment ==
Lord Jessel MR held that a union member’s right is founded on property, and because the member had disclosed no proprietary interest in the union in his statement of claim, he could not succeed.

The first question that I will consider is, what is the jurisdiction of a Court of Equity as regards interfering at the instance of a member of a society to prevent his being improperly expelled therefrom? I have no doubt whatever that the foundation of the jurisdiction is the right of property vested in the member of the society, and of which he is unjustly deprived by such unlawful expulsion. There is no such jurisdiction that I am aware of reposed, in this country at least, in any of the Queen's Courts to decide upon the rights of persons to associate together when the association possesses no property. Persons, and many persons, do associate together without any property in common at all. A dozen people may agree to meet and play whist at each other's houses for a certain period, and if eleven of them refuse to associate with the twelfth any longer, I am not aware that there is any jurisdiction in any Court of Justice in this country to interfere. Or a dozen or a hundred scientific men may agree with each other in the same way to meet alternately at each other's houses, or at any place where there is a possibility of their meeting each other; but if the association has no property, and takes no subscriptions from its members, I cannot imagine that any Court of Justice could interfere with such an association if some of the members declined to associate with some of the others. That is to say, the Courts, as such, have never dreamt of enforcing agreements strictly personal in their nature, whether they are agreements of hiring and service, being the common relation of master and servant, or whether they are agreements for the purpose of pleasure, or for the purpose of scientific pursuits, or for the purpose of charity or philanthropy—in such cases no Court of Justice can interfere so long as there is no property the right to which is taken away from the person complaining.

[...]

The present Plaintiff certainly does not state in his statement of claim that there is any property at all here, and I think that that is a fatal objection to the statement of claim altogether, and I might, if I thought fit, dismiss the action simply on that ground. He states nothing but that there is an association which he calls a “Trades Union,”—the “Journeymen Hatters' Fair Trade Union”—as governed by rules. He says that he has been a member, and that he has been unfairly and improperly expelled, but he does not allege that there is any property of any kind or description belonging to the union, or that he is entitled to any share of it. That is, however, a very technical ground, and I intend to base my judgment also on the larger ground that if he had stated fully the position and rules of this trades' union to which he belonged, the result would have been the same, for the reasons I am about to state.

If he had stated the rules this would have been discovered from them, that the members pay subscriptions and are liable also to the payment of certain fines, and that the moneys subscribed in that way are applicable to various purposes, which may be divided into two, those which I will call benefit purposes, and those which I will call trade purposes. The benefit purposes are the usual provisions of benefit societies amongst workmen,—provisions for sickness, for want of employment, for the deaths of the members and of their families, for providing funerals, for making provision for their widows and children, and so forth. Those are personal benefits to the members of the societies, and, no doubt, the law of benefit societies confers on the members of the benefit society, in consideration of their having paid their subscriptions, rights of property, that is, the right to participate in the benefits according to the rules of the society.

The other purposes, which I will call trade purposes, are of a totally different character. Their object is to regulate the carrying on of the trade of journeymen hatters, to provide in substance that the number of apprentices to the trade shall be limited, that the number of persons employed shall be limited, that they shall only work in shops in which no other persons work than persons who are recognised by the “ Journeymen Hatters' Fair Trade Union ,” and generally to control the affairs of the trade. There are some other special and peculiar provisions and privileges as well, which it is very difficult to put under the trade rules, but they really are portions of the trade rules, and all regulate the trade and the conduct of the people in the trade. Those are the trade purposes. As regards them there is no actual property at all; the members raise money, but it is to be applied for the one purpose of regulating the trade.

[...] The only question remaining, therefore, is whether the negative words in this Act, “nothing in this Act shall enable,” really prevent me giving him any relief whatever, because those words do not say that the Court may not otherwise enforce; all the section says is, “Nothing in this Act shall enable.”

The question, therefore, which I have to consider is, what would have happened without the Act? And it appears to me that without the Act it is clearly an unlawful association; it is an association by which men are not only restrained in trade, but they are bound to do certain acts under a penalty. Take the very act for which this man was expelled. He was expelled because he bound his son apprentice in a shop where the workmen did not belong to this union but to another union. That is the allegation. And the rule is that any man binding his son in a “foul shop,” which, as it has been explained to me, includes a shop of this description, where the members employed belong to another union and not to this union, shall be fined £5, and so on according to the rules. I see a great number of other stipulations of a character which are not only a restraint in trade, but so much in restraint of trade, limiting the subject of it, that I have no doubt that before this Act was passed these rules would have been altogether illegal; and if nothing in the Act, therefore, will assist the Plaintiff, he must still be in the position of a member of an illegal association coming to a Court of Justice to assist him to enforce his rights under that illegal association.

If that is so, it is impossible for me, and I do not think it ever was intended by the Legislature, looking to the terms of the Act of Parliament, to enable the Courts to interfere on behalf of the members of these societies for the purpose of getting relief inter se with respect to rights and liabilities contrary to the Act; and in construing the Act as I do, I believe I am not only fairly construing it, as is my habit, according to the literal meaning itself, but according to the manifest intention of the Legislature.

== See also ==
- UK labour law
