= The Unexpected Guest (novel) =

1999 novelization by Charles Osborne

- Dust-jacket illustration of the first UK edition
- Author: Agatha Christie
- Cover artist: Andrew Davidson
- Language: English
- Genre: Crime novel
- Publisher: HarperCollins
- Publication date: 6 September 1999
- Publication place: United Kingdom
- Media type: Print
- Pages: 188 (first edition, hardback)
- ISBN: 0-00-232690-6
- OCLC: 59407082

The Unexpected Guest is a novelization by Charles Osborne of the 1958 play of the same name by crime fiction writer Agatha Christie and was first published in the UK by HarperCollins on 6 September 1999, and on 1 October 1999 in the US by St. Martin's Press.

The book was written following the successful publication of the novelisation of the 1930 play Black Coffee in the previous year. Like that book, the novelisation is a straightforward transfer of the stage lines and directions of Christie's script into a written narrative. Osborne chose not to add characters, lines or scenes which would alter in any substantial way what had been presented on the stage forty-one years earlier although minor amendments were made to produce suitable chapter endings.

The following year, Spider's Web underwent a similar novelization process, again by Osborne.

== Plot ==
On a foggy night, the car of a man called Michael Starkwedder breaks down near an isolated house and, entering it, he finds the body of a dead man slumped in a chair. A woman stands over the corpse, gun in hand, and confesses to the murder. She gives her name as Laura Warwick, the wife of the dead man. She explains that he was always drunk and abusive. Michael decides not to turn her in to the police, and the two decide to come up with a cover-up story to protect Laura. In the end, they settle on an enemy from the past, by the name of MacGregor, whose son was run over by Richard Warwick, the dead man, several years ago. They slip a paper in Richard's pocket with the date of the accident, saying "Paid in full." Then they stage the murder so it appears to have been recent, alerting the residents of the building.

The police are soon alerted and begin to investigate. It is revealed that MacGregor is dead, and suspicions are exchanged. Meanwhile, Michael discovers that Laura was having an affair with another man, whom she believes murdered Richard. He, however, believes her to be guilty. Finally, it is revealed that Michael is MacGregor and he had come to avenge his son. He shouts this to Laura, along with the fact that he cares for her, and leaves through the French windows, running away.

== Critical reception ==
Publishers Weekly commented that it "absolutely retains the feel of a play merely masquerading as a novel rather than transformed into one. That's not all bad, as this novelization preserves the lightning-quick pace of the original."
