= Eleanor Rigby (statue) =

Statue in Liverpool, England

Coordinates: 53.40694°N 2.98664°W

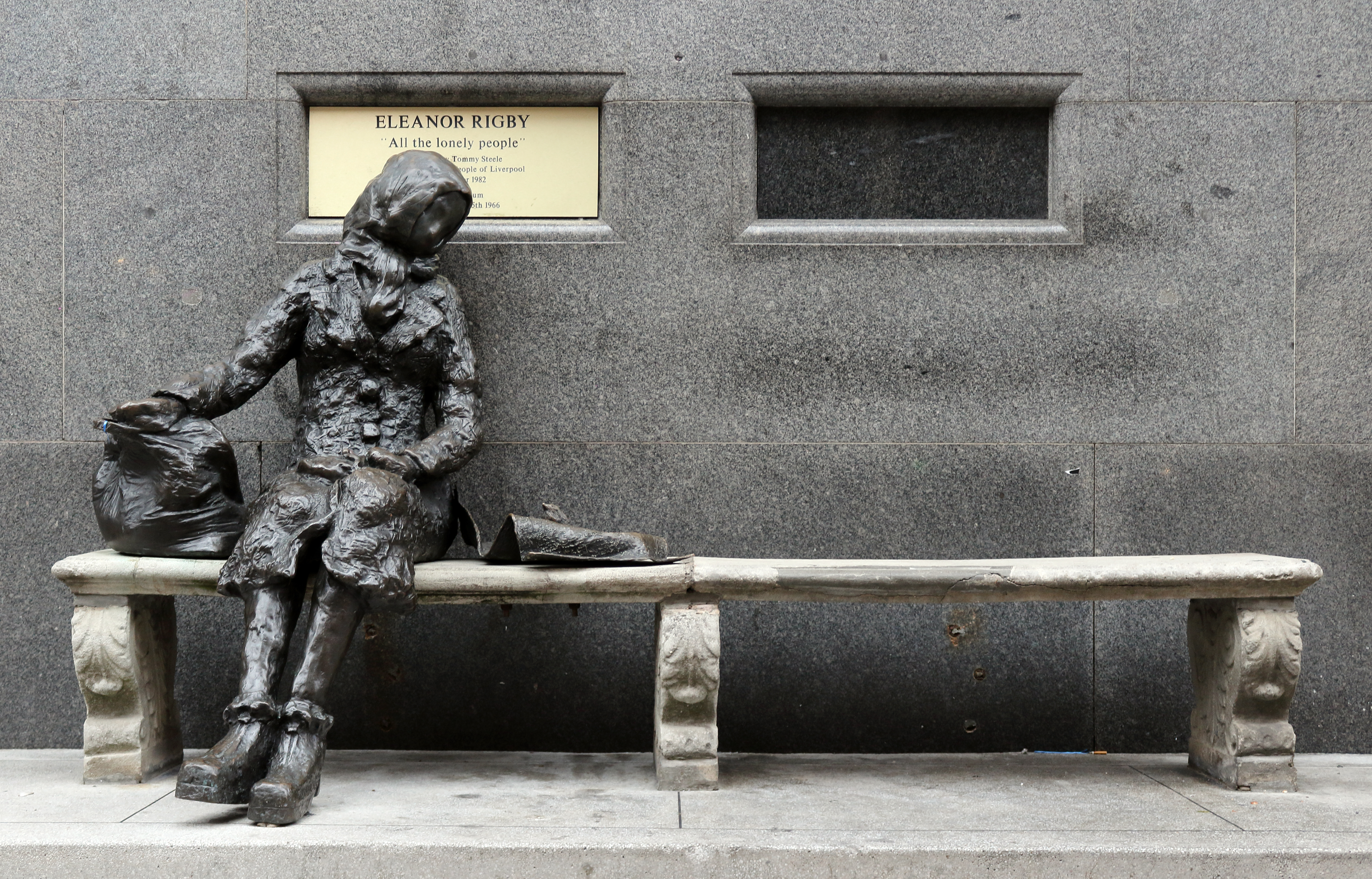
Eleanor Rigby statue

Eleanor Rigby is a statue in Stanley Street, Liverpool, England, designed and made by the entertainer Tommy Steele. It is based on the subject of the Beatles' 1966 song "Eleanor Rigby", which is credited to the Lennon–McCartney partnership.

== History ==
When Tommy Steele was performing in a show in Liverpool in 1981, he made an offer to Liverpool City Council to create a sculpture as a tribute to the Beatles. His fee for the commission would be three pence (half a sixpence). (Note: This was an allusion to Steele's musical show and film Half a Sixpence.) The offer was accepted by the council, as the statue would be expected to increase the tourist trade of the city, and they made a donation of £4,000 towards its cost. The project was otherwise funded by the Liverpool Echo.

The statue took nine months to make. Steele unveiled it in Liverpool on 3 December 1982.

== Description ==
The statue consists of a bronze figure on a stone bench. The figure is 128 centimetres (50 in) tall, 120 centimetres (47 in) wide, and 96 centimetres (38 in) deep. It depicts a seated woman with a handbag on her lap, a shopping bag on her right, and a copy of the Liverpool Echo on her left. Poking from the shopping bag is a milk bottle, and on the newspaper is a sparrow and a piece of bread. The woman is looking down at the sparrow.

Steele included what he described as "magical properties" in his design, all hidden inside the bronze figure and representing a different facet of life. These were: a four-leaf clover (for good luck), a page from the Bible (for spiritual guidance), football boots (representing sport and fun), a comic book (for comedy and adventure), and a sonnet (for love).

On the wall behind the figure is an inscribed plaque which originally read:

ELEANOR RIGBY

DEDICATED TO

"ALL THE LONELY PEOPLE ..."

This statue was sculpted and donated to the City of Liverpool

by Tommy Steele as a tribute to the Beatles.

The casting was sponsored by the Liverpool Echo.

DECEMBER 1982

This inscription has since been replaced.

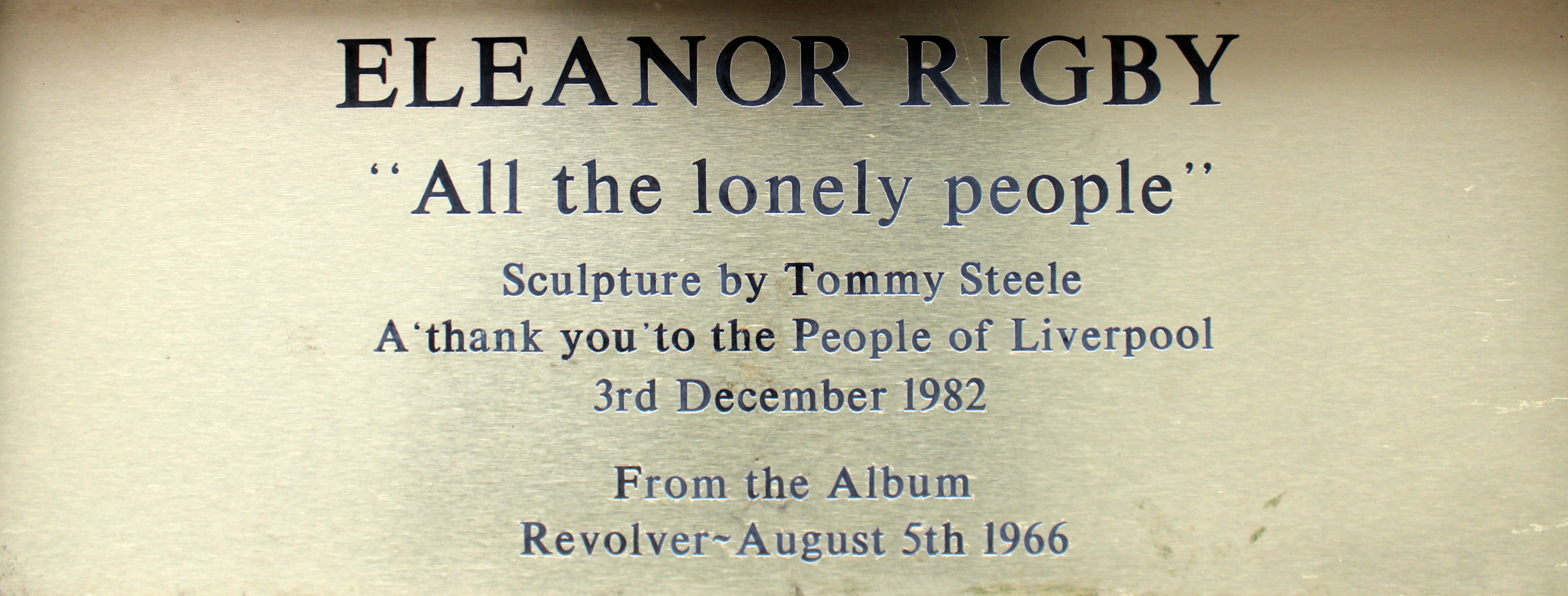
The plaque as it appears in 2018

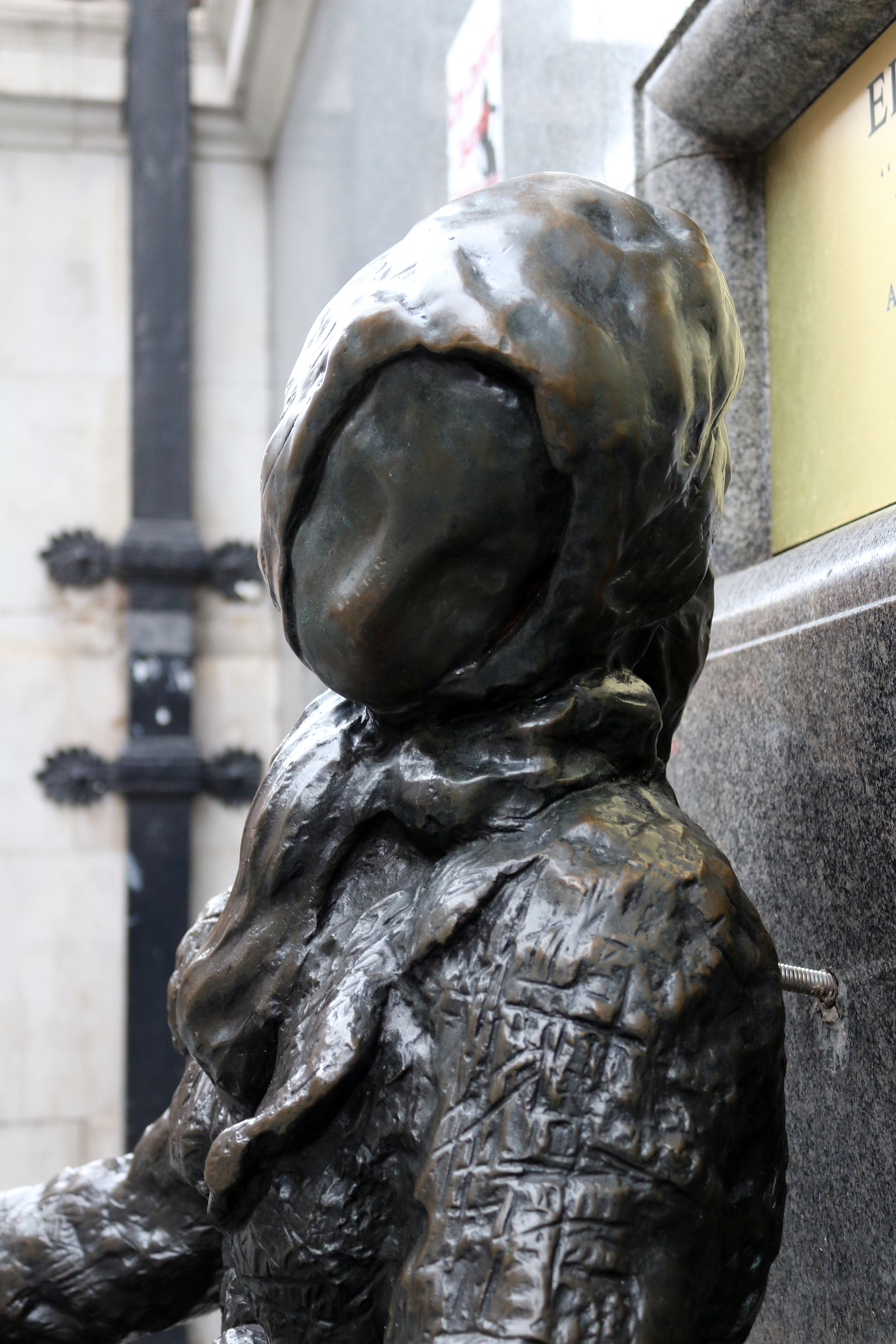
Close-up of Eleanor's face

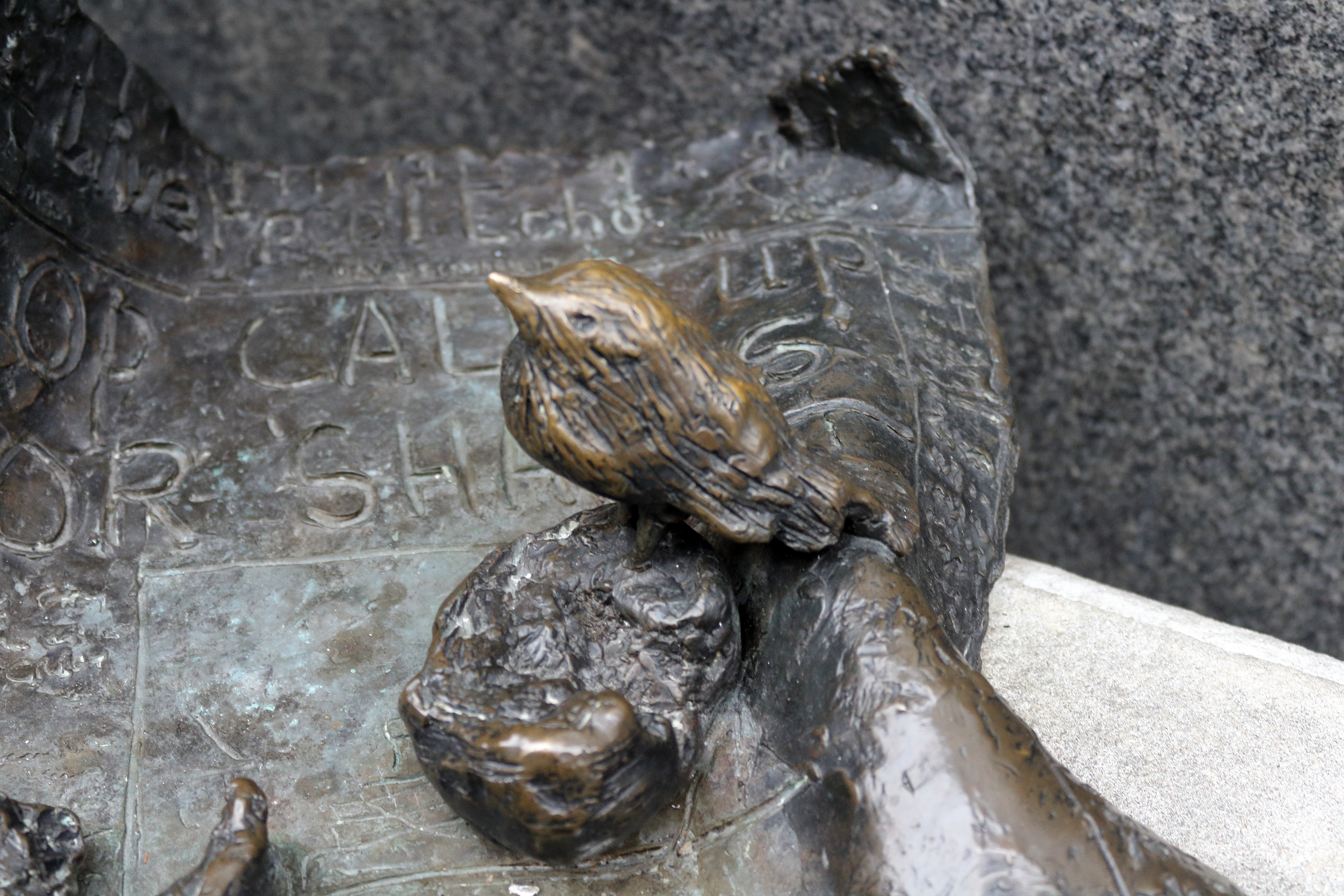
Close-up of the sparrow at which Eleanor is looking

== Notes and references ==
Notes

Citations
