= Charles Osborne (music writer) =

Australian/British author (1927–2017)

Charles Thomas Osborne (24 November 1927 – 23 September 2017) was an Australian journalist, theatre and opera critic, poet and novelist. He was the assistant editor of The London Magazine from 1958 until 1966, literature director of the Arts Council of Great Britain from 1971 until 1986, and chief theatre critic of Daily Telegraph (London) from 1986 to 1991.

He is the only author the Agatha Christie Estate has ever allowed to produce adapted works in her name.

== Life and career ==
Osborne was born in Brisbane, Australia. He taught himself to play the piano and at age 18 he began singing lessons.

Osborne's father hailed originally from Devon and his mother was from Vienna, a fact to which he attributed his lifelong love of opera. He went to school locally, then studied at the University of Queensland. Osborne then worked in literary and musical journalism and in repertory theatre in Australia and Britain, where he settled permanently in 1953. He played the role of Front Gunner Foxlee in the film The Dam Busters (1955), and acted in many plays across the UK including Black Coffee by Agatha Christie, which he later adapted as a novel.

From 1958, he was assistant editor of The London Magazine, founded by John Lehmann, which publishes poems, short stories and literary reviews. Osborne himself wrote poetry from an early age. He published three collections of poetry, including Swansong in 1968.

Between 1971 and 1986 he was literature director of the Arts Council of Great Britain. This involved dispensing government grants, and Osborne, perhaps inevitably, given the nature of the position, became embroiled in the so-called "poetry wars" that took place during the 1970s. Osborne gave an account of his tenure at the Arts Council in his autobiography Giving it Away: Memoirs of a Uncivil Servant. This sheds light on his influential role at the Arts Council, as does Peter Barry's 2006 book, Poetry Wars: British Poetry of the 1970s and the Battle of Earl's Court.

Between 1986 and 1991, Osborne was chief drama critic for the Daily Telegraph. He continued to write journalism on a wide variety of arts, leading to Vogue magazine dubbing him an uomo universale (universal man).

Osborne wrote about opera and published books on Verdi, Wagner, Mozart, Puccini, Richard Strauss and the bel canto operas. His book, The Complete Operas of Verdi, was the first on that composer by someone who had actually seen all the operas staged. It was translated into Italian and published by Ugo Mursia Editore. The Opera Lover's Companion appeared in 2004. He also from early years in London wrote sleeve notes LP covers, and served on the editorial board of Opera magazine from 1970 to 1999.

Osborne published an original novel, Pink Danube, in 2000 and adapted works for the stage as novels, which have been widely reprinted and translated into many languages. His novelised versions of Black Coffee (1998), The Unexpected Guest (1999) and Spider's Web (2000), all originally by Agatha Christie, have proved enduringly popular with readers. He also adapted Blithe Spirit (2004), by Noël Coward, and Oscar Wilde's The Importance of Being Earnest.

Osborne held an honorary doctorate from Griffith University, Brisbane, for services to the arts and was a fellow of the Royal Society of Literature. He was a former president, and later council member, of the UK Critics Circle.

In 2009, Italy conferred on him the honorific title of Commendatore dell'Ordine della Stella della solidarietà italiana, known as the Order of the Star of Italian Solidarity, for his outstanding contribution to the life and works of Verdi.

In 2011, the King's Head Theatre, London, staged a successful world premiere of an Oscar Wilde play, Constance. The only play by Wilde previously unproduced, Constance was unearthed, translated and adapted by Osborne from the original French. Professor Joseph Bristow, a Wilde scholar based at UCLA wrote "Constance presents us with a startling Wildean drama in an arresting style. I left the King's Head Theater realizing that Wilde might have truly become the Irish Ibsen of his day".

He died on 23 September 2017.

== Personal relationships ==
Barrett Reid was his former lover. He met his future civil partner, Ken Thomson, in Australia in 1962.

== Selected works ==
General

- Kafka, Oliver & Boyd, London 1967
- Swansong (poems), Shenval Press, London 1968
- The Opera House Album, Robson Books 1979 ISBN 0-8008-5836-0
- W. H. Auden: The Life of a Poet, Methuen, London 1980 ISBN 0-413-39670-3
- Letter to W. H. Auden and Other Poems, Calder Publications 1984 ISBN 0-7145-4036-6
- Giving it Away (memoirs), Secker & Warburg, London 1986 ISBN 0-436-35401-2
- Black Coffee (Agatha Christie), Collins Crime, London 1998 ISBN 0-00-232662-0
- The Life and Crimes of Agatha Christie, HarperCollins, London 1982, updated 1999 ISBN 0-00-653172-5
- Spider's Web (Agatha Christie), HarperCollins, London 1999 ISBN 0-00-651493-6
- The Unexpected Guest (Agatha Christie), HarperCollins, London 2000 ISBN 0-00-651368-9
- Murder in Three Stages (Agatha Christie), HarperCollins, London 2007 ISBN 0-00-724579-3

Music

- The Complete Operas of Verdi, Victor Gollancz, London 1969
- Wagner and his World, Thames & Hudson, London 1977 ISBN 0-500-13060-4
- The Complete Operas of Puccini, Victor Gollancz, London 1981 ISBN 0-575-03013-5
- How to Enjoy Opera, Piatkus, London 1982 ISBN 0-86188-144-3
- The Dictionary of Opera, Macdonald & Co, London, 1983 ISBN 0-356-09700-5
- The Complete Operas of Wagner, Victor Gollancz, London 1990 ISBN 0-575-05380-1
- The Complete Operas of Strauss, Victor Gollancz, London 1992 ISBN 0-575-05379-8
- The Complete Operas of Mozart, Victor Gollancz, London 1992 ISBN 0-575-03823-3
- The Bel Canto Operas, Methuen Publishing Ltd, London 1994 ISBN 978-0-413-68410-3
- The Opera Lover's Companion, Yale University Press ISBN 978-0-300-10440-0
