= Thomas Rigby =

Welsh publican and barber, formerly enslaved

- Born: c. 1783
- Died: 8 March 1841; Llanelli, Wales
- Occupations: Publican, barber
- Spouse: Mary Rigby (née Richards)
- Children: George, Mary Ann, George, Alexander, Thomas, Elizabeth, William, Jane, Caroline

Thomas Rigby (c. 1783 – 1841) was a Welsh publican and barber who lived in Kidwelly and Llanelli during the nineteenth century. He was among very few Black people recorded in the district during the first half of the 1800s.

== Early life ==
Rigby was born c. 1783, though his parentage, birth name, and birthplace remain unknown. At approximately eight years old, he was abducted by slave-hunters and taken to an unknown destination in the West Indies. The origin of the Rigby surname is uncertain, though it may be linked to Richard Rigby, an MP (1722–1788) of Mistley Hall, Essex, who owned sugar, cocoa, and coffee plantations in Antigua, Grenada, and Jamaica.

In 1817, Rigby arrived in Kidwelly in the company of Reverend John Norcross.

== Family and career ==
On 19 January 1819, Rigby married Mary Richards (1801–1854), a local woman who had grown up on a farm near Llanelli. Neither appears to have been literate, as both left their marks rather than signatures on the marriage certificate. Mary's younger sister, Elizabeth Richards (1806–1886), later became the mother of the musician Joseph Parry (1841–1903).

Thomas and Mary ran several public houses in Kidwelly and Llanelli over the following years. Thomas occasionally held other occupations, working as a gentleman's servant and a barber.

Thomas and Mary had nine children, though not all survived to adulthood: George (1819–1822), Mary Ann (1821–1878), another son named George (1824–1844), Alexander (1826–1833), Thomas junior (1829–1844), Elizabeth (1834–1834), William (1838–1892), Jane (1839–1840), and Caroline (1840–1876). Mary Ann became a cook, working in service for a doctor's family in Swansea, while William became a cabinet maker and moved to Merthyr Tydfil.

== Death ==
Thomas Rigby died on 8 March 1841 in Llanelli, where he was running the Union Tavern. He was buried two days later in Saint Mary's cemetery, Kidwelly. The Cambrian newspaper, announcing his death, provided only a brief life sketch, describing him as "an industrious and harmless man". After his death, Mary continued working as a publican and remarried three years later.

== Historical context ==
Though Rigby was one of very few Black people in the district during the first half of the nineteenth century, he was not the first traceable through historical records. A young Black man called Jack of St Christopher (died 1738) was baptised at Pembrey in 1723. In 1738, Sabacon Gambia (died 1784) was baptised at St Peter's, Carmarthen, and in 1742 was granted a license to marry Candace de Gambia (died 1760) in Kidwelly. The surname 'Gambia', along with notes in baptismal, marriage, and death registers, identified them as Black people.

== Bibliography ==
- Archives Wales, Carmarthenshire Baptisms, Marriages and Burials (CPR/70/13)
- Cooke, D. (2007). 'Evidence for Africans in Carmarthenshire during the eighteenth century', The Carmarthen Antiquary, vol. 43, pp. 65–69
- 'Died', The Cambrian, 20 March 1841, p. 3
- England & Wales, National Probate Calendar (Index of Wills and Administrations), 1858–1966
- Jarman, M. (2020). 'What Happened to Thomas Rigby "The Black Barber" of Lanelly?', Llanelli Community Heritage, 1 November 2020
- John, L. (2014). 'Thomas the Black Barber', Llanelli Community Heritage, 13 July 2014
- 'Richard Rigby MP of Mistley Hall', Legacies of British Slavery database, UCL
