= Rigsby Islands =

Group of islands in Antarctica

Rigsby Islands (66°40′S 67°37′W) is a small group of ice-capped islands lying off the northeast coast of Adelaide Island, about 2 nautical miles (3.7 km) south of Sillard Islands. Mapped from air photos taken by Ronne Antarctic Research Expedition (RARE) (1947–48) and Falkland Islands and Dependencies Aerial Survey Expedition (FIDASE) (1956–57). Named by United Kingdom Antarctic Place-Names Committee (UK-APC) for George P. Rigsby, American geologist who has specialized in the investigation of ice crystal structure and the plasticity of ice.

== See also ==
- List of Antarctic and sub-Antarctic islands
