= The Happiest Days of Your Life (play) =

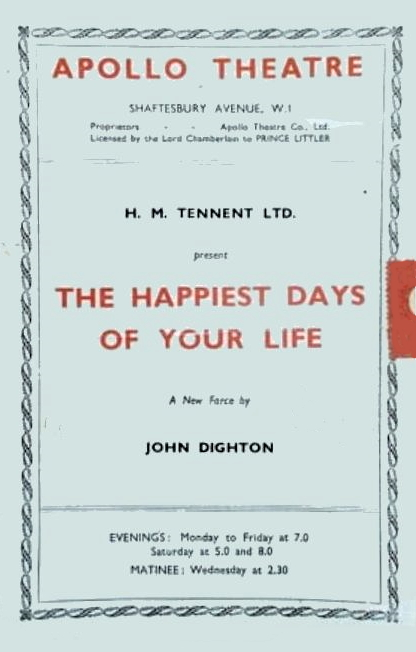
Programme for original West End run

The Happiest Days of Your Life is a farce by the English playwright John Dighton. It depicts the complications that ensue when because of a bureaucratic error a girls' school is made to share premises with a boys' school. The title of the play echoes the old saying that schooldays are "the happiest days of our lives".

The play was first seen on BBC Television in 1947, and then, after a one-night try-out in the West End later that year, it opened at the Apollo Theatre in March 1948, running for more than 600 performances. It has subsequently been revived, and adapted for broadcasting and the cinema.

== Background and first productions ==
The title of the play alludes to the old saying, dating back to at least the early 19th century, that schooldays are "the happiest days of our lives". The play was first seen on BBC Television in its early post-war days, screened live on 4 February 1947 and again on 6 February. It was staged for a single Sunday-night try-out at the Strand Theatre, London, on 3 November 1947, and opened at the Apollo Theatre, London, on 29 March 1948 where it ran for 605 performances, until 10 September 1949.

		BBC Television February 1947	Strand Theatre November 1947	Apollo Theatre 1948–1949
Dick Tassell	Assistant master at Hilary Hall	Nigel Stock	Nigel Stock	Myles Eason
Rainbow	School porter and groundsman	Richard Turner	Ernest Jay	Douglas Ives
Rupert Billings	Senior assistant master at Hilary Hall	Brian Oulton	Brian Oulton	Colin Gordon
Godfrey Pond	Headmaster of Hilary Hall	Richard Goolden	Maurice Denham	George Howe
Miss Evelyn Whitchurch	Principal of St Swithins School for Girls	Jane Henderson	Barbara Leake	Margaret Rutherford
Miss Gossage	Senior assistant mistress at St Swithins	Marjorie Gresley	Joan Harben	Viola Lyel
Hopcroft Minor	Pupil at Hilary Hall	Ray Jackson	?	Peter Davies
Barbara Cahoun (Note: In the BBC version the character was named Barbara Marchbanks ("not spelt Marjoribanks") as opposed to Cahoun ("not spelt Colquhoun") in the stage and film versions.)	Pupil at St Swithins	Deidre Doone	Molly Weir	Molly Weir
Joyce Harper	Assistant mistress at St Swithins	Hilary Liddell	Elizabeth Gibb	Patricia Hastings
The Reverend Edward Peck		Stringer Davis	Graveley Edwards	Noel Howlett (Note: Succeeded by Stringer Davis during the run.)
Mrs Peck	his wife	Hilda Davies	Betty Woolfe	Betty Woolfe
Edgar Sowter		Douglas Stewart	Edward Lexy	Edward Lexy
Mrs Sowter	his wife	Una Venning	Margery Brice	Irene Relph

== Plot ==
The play is set in 1947. Dick Tassell is returning as a schoolmaster at Hilary Hall, a boys' school, after five years in the Royal Air Force. Many wartime expedients are still in force, and the staff of the College reconcile themselves to having to share their premises with another school, whose bombed buildings remain in ruins. But by a bureaucratic error, the school to be billeted at Hilary Hall is St Swithins – a girls' school.

After early skirmishing and mutual disdain the Headmaster of Hilary Hall, Godfrey Pond, and the Principal of St Swithins, Miss Whitchurch, try to reach an accommodation to cope with the ensuing problems. Miss Whitchurch establishes an early advantage by getting the men to stop smoking on the premises and to have the dormitories reserved for the girls, with the boys reduced to sleeping in the carpentry room. She is obliged to cooperate with Pond when parents turn up, the girls' expecting netball, the boys', boxing and cricket. It is unthinkable that they should learn that their children are mingling with the opposite sex. By frantic manoeuvring the staff keep the two lots of parents from meeting each other and ensure, by the narrowest of margins and high-speed moves of pupils from one classroom to another, that each set sees what they are expecting to see in the classroom and on the sports field. Matters are further complicated by the relations between the male and female teachers. Tassell and Joyce Harper, one of Miss Whitchurch's younger staff, become increasingly close (ending up together by the end of the play) while Miss Gossage, Miss Whitchurch's hearty deputy, becomes keen on Rupert Billings, Pond's blasé mathematics master, who is aghast at her interest in him.

At the end of Act 2 the deception finally falls apart: both sets of parents, the boys and girls, and the staff of both schools all run into each other. Miss Whitchurch faints into Miss Gossage's arms. In the last act the two head teachers make strenuous attempts to get the bureaucratic blunder resolved, while the parents become increasingly irate. At the end of the play a fleet of coaches arrives bearing the staff and pupils of another displaced school – this one co-educational. As the chaos mounts, Miss Whitchurch blows a piercing blast on a whistle, the action freezes and the play ends.

== Revivals and adaptations ==
The play was staged by the Edinburgh Gateway Company in 1965. It was revived by the Royal Shakespeare Company at the Barbican Theatre in 1984, with a cast headed by Peggy Mount as Miss Whitchurch and John Cater as Pond, with Paul Greenwood as Dick Tassell and Richard O'Callaghan as Billings. The Royal Exchange Theatre, Manchester staged a revival in 2004, with Janet Henfrey and Philip Madoc as Miss Whitchurch and Pond.

A month after the run at the Apollo ended, the BBC televised the play for the third time, on 11 October 1949; Hermione Baddeley played Miss Whitchurch and Denys Blakelock played Pond. Other cast members included Digby Wolfe (Tassell), Alan Wheatley (Billings) and Isabel Dean (Joyce Harper). Radio adaptations were made in 1952 with Winifred Oughton and Cecil Trouncer as Miss Whitchurch and Pond, 1965 with Marjorie Westbury and Carleton Hobbs, and in 1979 with Roger Hammond and Margot Boyd. A television version was broadcast in 1962 with Fabia Drake and Eric Barker.

The play was adapted for the cinema under the same title in 1950 with a plot generally faithful to the original (Dighton being co-author of the screenplay). Rutherford played Miss Whitchurch, Pond was played by Alastair Sim and Joyce Grenfell played Miss Gossage.

== Notes, references and sources ==
=== Sources ===
- Gaye, Freda, ed. (1967). Who's Who in the Theatre (fourteenth ed.). London: Sir Isaac Pitman and Sons. OCLC 5997224.
- Dighton, John (1951). The Happiest Days of Your Life. London: Samuel French. ISBN 978-0-573-01169-6.
