= Rigsby sisters =

American whistleblowers

Kerri Rigsby and Cori Rigsby (Moran) are the American sisters who worked for eight years at E.A. Renfroe Company and were managers overseeing catastrophe claims adjusters. Kerri and Cori Rigsby are also the whistleblowers who proved to a Mississippi jury that State Farm committed fraud against the U.S. government. The sisters claim State Farm ignored or minimized wind damage to avoid payments relating to Hurricane Katrina and instead attributed damage to flooding so that the National Flood Insurance Program would cover the claims. The jury verdict was upheld by the U.S. Court of Appeals for the Fifth Circuit, was then affirmed 8-0 by the United States Supreme Court. The Rigsbys were managers who worked in Gulfport, Mississippi for a subcontractor hired by State Farm to adjust wind and flood claims after Hurricane Katrina. They were the first to uncover a fraudulent scheme by State Farm to improperly categorize wind damage as flood damage. This mischaracterization was very important because State Farm had to pay for wind damage out of its own pocket under State Farm homeowner policies, while flood damage was paid by the federal government under FEMA's flood policies. Over the course of several months, the sisters amassed thousands of pages of documents related to State Farm's activities. The Rigsbys' landmark win was historic because they were the first to prove that an insurance company defrauded the government in FEMA's National Flood Insurance Program despite testimony by FEMA’s Executive Director that, after investigating the allegations, he personally didn't believe that there was any fraud by State Farm, and he confirmed that FEMA had not asked State Farm to repay any money to the National Flood Insurance Program. However, according to court documents, the sisters took the documents without authorization. Their actions in regard to these documents is the subject of ongoing legal action. Eventually, their story went public when ABC's 20/20 show aired it in August 2006. In 2008, Judge Senter of the U.S. District Court of the Southern District of Mississippi found that the sisters and their attorneys had acted unethically when the Scruggs Katrina Group paid the sisters $150,000 per year each to testify, and barred them from testifying or using any of the documents that were taken. Scruggs was later forced to withdraw as their attorney because he improperly paid them for downloading and giving him the State Farm claims files and other documents to use in his lawsuits against State Farm. Scruggs also was later disbarred after pleading guilty to conspiracy to bribe a state circuit court judge in 2008 and separately, to improperly influence another state court circuit judge. He was sentenced to serve five years and seven years, to run concurrently, on the two guilty pleas.

== FEMA's Federal Flood Program ==
Many homeowners who live in coastal areas have two insurance policies on their homes: (1) homeowners' policies, which are underwritten by private insurers and cover damage from wind; and (2) flood policies, which are underwritten by the National Flood Insurance Program and cover damage from flooding. Private insurance companies contract with the government and are paid fees for selling the federal flood insurance policies, for collecting the premiums, and for adjusting flood claims under those policies.

== Judge Senter's order ==
On April 4, 2008, Judge Senter disqualified the Rigsby sisters from testifying:

State Farm and Renfroe have charged Scruggs with two basic types of ethical misconduct and with conflicts of interest, all of which relate in one way or another to the relationship between Scruggs and the SKG and two former Renfroe employees Cori and Kerri Rigsby (the Rigsby sisters). State Farm and Renfroe allege 1) that Scruggs participated and encouraged the Rigsby sisters to wrongfully appropriate and disclose confidential documents in which both State Farm and Renfroe had a legitimate right to confidentiality; and 2) that Scruggs paid the Rigsby sisters a substantial sum in furtherance of Scruggs's efforts to encourage the misappropriation of these documents.

State Farm and Renfroe have alleged additional acts of misconduct relating to other witnesses and to the plaintiffs' counsel having obtained documentary and physical evidence without following the established procedure for the use of out-of-state subpoenas in the discovery process.

I have determined that disqualification is required because Scruggs, acting in furtherance of the SKG joint venture, paid the Rigsby sisters a substantial sum of money (a consulting fee of $150,000 per year) despite Scruggs's knowledge that the Rigsby sisters were material witnesses in connection with many hurricane damage claims that were likely to become the subject of litigation. While Scruggs made the arrangements for these payments, the other members of the SKG joint venture knew or should have known that the payments were being made, and I am of the opinion that their failure to take timely and reasonable remedial steps or to object to this arrangement amounts to a ratification of Scruggs's actions. While the other ethical misconduct alleged by State Farm and Renfroe are substantial, the payments to the Rigsby sisters are, in and of themselves, sufficient to warrant disqualification.

It is apparent to me, from my review of the deposition testimony of the Rigsby sisters, that there was no legitimate reason for these payments and that the "consulting" work that ostensibly justified these payments was a sham. Even if this were not the case, the performance of legitimate work that is closely related to a matter in litigation cannot justify an attorney's payment of a substantial sum of money to a non-expert material witness.

Payments to non-expert witnesses are specifically limited to statutory witness fees; reasonable expenses actually incurred for mileage, meals, and lodging; and reasonable compensation for time lost from work while attending a trial or testifying by deposition. (Opinion No. 145 of the Mississippi State Bar Ethics Committee, March 11, 1988). The payments Scruggs made to the Rigsby sisters bears no reasonable connection to any work they performed or to any of expenses they incurred in testifying. These payments were clearly improper. N.L.R.B. v. Thermon Heat Tracing Services, Inc., 143 F.3d 181 (5 Cir.1998); Golden Door Jewelry Creations, Inc. v. Lloyds Underwriters Non-Marine Ass'n, 865 F.Supp 1516, 1526 (S.D.Fla.1994); Rentclub, Inc. v. Transamerica Rental Fin. Corp., 811 F.Supp 651, 653 (M.D.Fla.1992), aff'd 43 F.3d 1439 (11th Cir.1995); Wagner v. Lehman Bros. Kuhn Loeb Inc., 646 F.Supp 643 (N.D.Ill.1986).

Even though the payments to the Rigsby sisters originated with Scruggs, the other members of the joint venture were aware or should have been aware that the payments were being made and did nothing to prevent their continued payment. In these circumstances, all of the other members of the original SKG are responsible for this breach of ethics. Those whom these firms have subsequently associated must also be disqualified to prevent the appearance of impropriety in the remainder of this litigation. See MRPC 5.1(c) ("A lawyer shall be responsible for another lawyer's violation of the rules of professional conduct if: (1) the lawyer orders or, with knowledge of the specific conduct, ratifies the conduct involved ... or ... knows of the conduct at the time when its consequences can be avoided or mitigated but fails to take reasonable remedial action."); See American Can Co. v. Citrus Feed Co., 436 F.2d 1125, 1128-29 (5th Cir.1971).

The payments made to the Rigsby sisters require the disqualification of the successors to the SKG and those whom they have added as associates from further participation in any litigation in this Court against State Farm and Renfroe arising from property damage attributable to Hurricane Katrina. The motions to disqualify will be granted. An appropriate order will be entered, and the plaintiffs in all cases affected by this disqualification shall be allowed a period of forty-five days in which to retain new counsel or to notify the Court of their intention to proceed pro-se. For good cause, this period may be enlarged at the discretion of the United States Magistrate Judge assigned to the case. The plaintiff's failure to retain new counsel or to inform the court of the intention to proceed pro-se will make a case subject to this order eligible for dismissal without prejudice. The attorneys subject to disqualification by the terms of this order shall send, via United States mail, postage prepaid, a copy of the opinion and order in this case to each client affected by this ruling.

The Rigsby sisters will be disqualified as witnesses in any actions now pending on this Court's docket against State Farm or Renfroe in which the SKG or the KLG has represented the plaintiffs, and any documents supplied by the Rigsby sisters to the SKG or the KLG or its associates shall also be excluded from evidence unless the plaintiffs can show that the documents were obtained through ordinary methods of discovery.

== Documents ==
The sisters say they ultimately obtained about 15,000 pages of claims records. Their collection of these documents is the subject of ongoing legal action. Their former employer filed suit in Alabama asking that the court order the return of the documents. The suit claims the sisters took the documents without permission or authorization.

The Rigsby sisters alleged that State Farm’s action in McIntosh was not an isolated incident, but a widespread campaign by State Farm to pressure engineers to issue certain types of reports to reduce State Farm's liability. State Farm representatives in Bloomington, IL, the home office, say what the women describe would be contrary to the company's claims practices.

== E. A. Renfroe ==
E.A. Renfroe, the company that contracted with State Farm Insurance Co., sued the Rigsby sisters on September 1, 2006, asking the court to enjoin the Rigsby sisters’ further use of the documents and require them to return State Farm’s documents to Renfroe. Renfroe alleged in its lawsuit that Cori and Kerri Rigsby broke the law when they turned over reams of internal State Farm records to their attorney, Richard Scruggs. Renfroe's lawsuit, filed in an Alabama federal court, accused the sisters of violating the Alabama Trade Secrets Act and breaching confidentiality agreements with the company. Renfroe successfully asked a judge to order the Rigsby sisters to return the documents they presented Scruggs and to bar them from continuing to disclose information. Scruggs's efforts to evade this order resulted in a charge of criminal contempt against him that was eventually dismissed. A final judgment in the case was entered in favor of Renfroe (the plaintiffs).

The Rigsby sisters also sued Renfroe in their whistleblower suit against State Farm on several grounds, including unlawful retaliation for firing them, but Renfroe won on all counts against it, and was dismissed from the lawsuit before trial.

== Court ==
=== November 2006 ===
Attorney General Jim Hood's office argued that the Alabama suit, E.A. Renfroe & Co. Inc. v. Moran, No. 06-CV-1752, should be suspended until the Mississippi Attorney General's office completed its criminal investigation into post-Katrina insurance claims practices. They claimed the government's case could be compromised if the civil case continued. The court denied the Mississippi Attorney General’s request.

Insurance Commissioner George Dale: Dale launched his own investigation of the insurance industry and began with State Farm because they were the biggest insurance company in Mississippi. Dale claimed he was spurred on by policyholder complaints aired on local television.

=== December 2006 ===
Federal Judge William Acker Jr. requires the Rigsby sisters to return the documents to E.A. Renfroe.

=== January 2007 ===
The Rigsby sisters testify for the Mississippi Attorney General before a Mississippi grand jury about what they saw while working as claims adjusters after Hurricane Katrina.

In Alabama, Judge Acker orders the sisters to show why they should not be held in contempt of his order in December 2006 as they had yet to turn over the documents. Acker also requires Scruggs and the Scruggs law firm to show why they should not be held in civil contempt.

In a court hearing on January 31, E.A. Renfroe's attorney requested the Rigsby sisters and their attorneys face civil and criminal charges for their actions.

=== February 2008 ===
The charge of criminal contempt against Scruggs is dismissed.

=== April 2008 ===
A federal judge dismissed the action by Thomas and Pamela McIntosh of bad faith and fraud against State Farm and Renfroe. They had filed a claim after State Farm minimized its liability by using a second engineering report which minimized wind damage for which State Farms was liable and blamed flood and storm. Judge Senter dismissed Renfroe, finding that there was no basis for the McIntoshes’ claim of fraud against State Farm and Renfroe, and since there was no basis for a claim of fraud, Renfroe could not have “aided and abetted” State Farm in a “fraud that did not occur.”

=== September 2008 ===
Thomas and Pamela McIntosh settle their lawsuit against State Farm for $250,000. Renfroe had already been dismissed from that lawsuit.

=== July 2009 ===
The finding of contempt by the District Court overruled in the U.S. Court of Appeals for the eleventh circuit.

=== June 2010 ===
Federal Magistrate Judge Robert Walker ruled that State Farm should not be required to hand over engineering reports to the Risbys, The case involved claimants Thomas and Pamela McIntosh whose house was damaged and two engineering reports, the first citing wind damage and the second tidal surges. The Risbys also were seeking any other altered reports in an attempt to establish a pattern of fraudulent behaviour.

=== June 2012 ===
Judge Halil S Ozerden in the District Court of the Southern District of Mississippi ruled on final motions by State Farm and the Rigsbys. State Farms repeated motions to have the case dismissed were denied and the Rigsbys were limited to provided testimony only in the case of Thomas and Pamela McIntosh as they had direct knowledge of the documents in that case.

=== April 2013 ===
In Federal Count a jury found for the Rigsby sisters in their whistle-blower lawsuit against State Farm. The plaintiffs suggested that State Farm minimized its wind damage payout to $30,000 when the policy provided for up to $500,000 by charging the National Flood Insurance Program where payments were paid by the government. FEMA’s Executive Director testified at trial that, after investigating the allegations, he personally didn't believe that there was any fraud by State Farm, and he confirmed that FEMA had not asked State Farm to repay any money to the National Flood Insurance Program.

=== March 2014 ===
In the federal court a jury found that State Farm had defrauded the government in a policyholder claim. State Farm was ordered to pay the Rigsbys attorneys $2.6 million plus expenses of just over $300,000. The Rigsby sisters were to each receive 15 percent of the $750,000 awarded to the government. The case involved the claim of Thomas and Pamela McIntosh only and the judge refused to allow any claims on other properties to be included. The Rigsbys launched an appeal to the 5th U.S. Circuit Court of Appeals in New Orleans.

=== April 2015 ===
State Farm is sued in a claim filed 21 April by the Mississippi Attorney General over allegations that they minimized wind damage in their response to claims which resulted in the states Homeowner Assistance Program paying far more than it should have. The private attorneys for the Rigsbys have been engaged by the state.

=== July 2015 ===
The Rigsby sisters were successful in their qui tam appeal in the Fifth Circuit Court of Appeals to expand their claims of fraud in relation to the adjustment of National Flood Insurance Program claims. The court found that many homeowners were covered by at least two policies, one for wind and one for flood. A private insurance company administering both policies would be liable for wind damage but would pay flood damage with government funds. It would be in the company's interest to classify Hurricane Katrina damage as flood related to minimize its exposure to payouts. State Farm argues that the case should have been dismissed as the Rigsbys lawyer, Scruggs sent documents to the media when they were still under seal. Scruggs was gaoled over another matter and the court ruled that violating the seal should not result in the dismissal of the case,

=== August 2015 ===
State Farm to challenge the ruling by the Fifth Circuit in the U.S. Supreme Court with a certiorari petition. Their argument centres around the plaintiffs talking with the media and thus violating the 60 day seal provisions of the False Claims Act.

=== June 2016 ===
State Farm has lodged a case in the U.S. Supreme Court, 'State Farm Fire & Casualty Co. v. United States ex rel. Rigsby, to be heard in the term which commences in October 2016. State Farm is arguing that the attorneys for the Rigsbys violated a part of the False Claims Act, that is they released documents which were under the 60 day seal rule. The decision of the Supreme Court has ramifications beyond the matter being argued, as the Rigsbys attorneys argue that State Farms actions could involve thousands of cases. State Farm want clarification on the 60 day seal rule as in this particular matter the breaching of the rule was overlooked by a lower court and the action allowed to continue.

=== November 1, 2016 ===
Arguments before the Supreme Court. The justices will vote at the end of the week, but the complexity of the case means that it will most probably come down to a written judgement after they achieve consensus over the winter. The case is pending.

=== December 6, 2016 ===
The U.S. Supreme Court decision for 'State Farm Fire & Casualty Co. v. United States ex rel. Rigsby was finalized on December 6, 2016, with a unanimous 8-0 ruling against State Farm.

== Whistleblower recognition ==
In February 2007, Mississippi state senators Dawkins and Williamson submitted a resolution, Mississippi Senate Concurrent Resolution 574,, to the state legislature commending the Rigsby sisters for their actions. The resolution died in committee and the Rigsbys garnered no formal recognition by the legislature.
