= Myles Eason =

Australian actor (1915–1977)

Myles Eason (7 May 1915 – 1977) was an Australian actor who performed mostly on stage in England.

He began his career in Melbourne then moved to England in 1937. He appeared on Broadway.

== Selected filmography ==
- The Rough and the Smooth (1959) as Bobby Montagu-Jones
