= Personal jurisdiction in Internet cases in the United States =

Personal jurisdiction in Internet cases refers to a growing set of judicial precedents in American courts where personal jurisdiction has been asserted upon defendants based solely on their Internet activities. Personal jurisdiction in American civil procedure law is premised on the notion that a defendant should not be subject to the decisions of a foreign or out of state court, without having "purposely availed" himself of the benefits that the forum state has to offer. Generally, the doctrine is grounded on two main principles: courts should protect defendants from the undue burden of facing litigation in an unlimited number of possibly remote jurisdictions (in line with the due process requirements of the Constitution), and courts should prevent states from infringing on the sovereignty of other states by limiting the circumstances under which defendants can be "haled" into court.

In the Internet context, personal jurisdiction cases often involve proprietors of websites or Internet-based services that either advertise or actively promote their businesses nationally, but argue that they do not have sufficient contacts within a particular state to subject them to litigation in that state. With the growth of the Internet, courts have faced the challenge of applying long-standing principles of personal jurisdiction to a borderless communication medium that enables businesses and individuals all over the world to instantaneously interact across state boundaries. This is a rapidly changing area of law without a Supreme Court precedent. There is however, a growing consensus among federal district courts as to how to determine when personal jurisdiction may be asserted in an Internet context.

== Types of personal jurisdiction ==
Besides facing constitutional limitations on personal jurisdiction, a court must also comply with state long-arm statutes, which enable personal jurisdiction over a party who has committed a tort within the state. This personal jurisdiction is specific to the act, and a party cannot be sued for unrelated activity. In many instances, state long-arm statutes extend personal jurisdiction to the extent allowed by the U.S. Constitution.

There are two kinds of personal jurisdiction, general and specific jurisdiction:

=== General personal jurisdiction ===
Following the Supreme Court's decisions in Goodyear Dunlop Tires Operations, S.A. v. Brown (2011) and Daimler AG v. Bauman (2014), a company doing business on the Internet may be sued for any reason in the jurisdiction where it is "at home," typically its place of incorporation. Because general jurisdiction is now quite limited, courts will often look to specific personal jurisdiction to determine whether a company is amenable to suit in a given jurisdiction.

=== Specific personal jurisdiction ===
In contrast, specific personal jurisdiction allows a defendant to be sued in a forum only on the basis of the defendant's contacts with the forum. A court can establish specific jurisdiction over a defendant only if he or she has "certain minimum contacts" which give rise to the action in question in the forum such that the exercise of jurisdiction "does not offend traditional notions of fair play and substantial justice." Internet cases with an out-of-state defendant will often require the plaintiff to assert specific personal jurisdiction.

Where a civil action has been brought based on a defendant's Internet activities, courts have generally declined to assert personal jurisdiction solely on the basis of web advertising. Instead, courts have looked for more active contacts with a forum, such as Internet sales to the forum residents, conducting business in the forum state through numerous contacts, or entering into specific dealings with forum residents. The actual number of visitors to a defendant's website from citizens of the forum state has also sometimes been considered in an analysis of minimum contacts.

== Standards for personal jurisdiction in Internet cases ==
In evaluating the assertion of personal jurisdiction in cases involving the Internet, courts have applied both traditional tests and standards customized to the online world.

=== Traditional tests of jurisdiction ===
==== Minimum contacts ====
The United States Supreme Court decided in 1945 in the case of International Shoe v. Washington that for a defendant to be haled into court in a particular jurisdiction it must have at least a minimum level of contact with that state that it could reasonably expect to be sued in the courts of that state.

Following International Shoe, courts have generally applied a three-part test in evaluating minimum contacts sufficient for jurisdiction:

(1) The nonresident defendant must do some act or consummate some transaction with the forum or perform some act by which he purposefully avails himself of the privilege of conducting activities in the forum, thereby invoking the benefits and protections[;] (2) the claim must be one which arises out of or results from the defendant's forum-related activities[; and] (3) exercise of jurisdiction must be reasonable.

==== The "effects" or "Calder" test ====
Courts may also apply the "effects" test from Calder v. Jones, 465 U.S. 783 (1984), in cases with insufficient interactivity or minimum contacts, but where an action is targeted at a particular forum. In Calder, a California resident in the entertainment business sued the National Enquirer, located in Florida, for libel based on an allegedly defamatory article published by the magazine. While the article was written and edited in Florida, the Court found that personal jurisdiction was properly established in California because of the effects of the defendants' conduct in that state. As the article concerned a California resident with a career in California and relied on California sources, the Court found the defendants' "intentional, and allegedly tortious, actions were expressly aimed at California."

In the Internet context, the effects test can be used to examine the exact nature of a defendant's Internet activities to determine whether its out of state actions were directed at parties or entities within the forum state. This is referred to in the language of Calder v. Jones as "purposeful direction," which requires (a) an intentional action, that was (b) expressly aimed at the forum state, with (c) knowledge that the brunt of the injury would be felt in the forum state. If a court finds that a defendant's actions meets the standard of purposeful direction, then personal jurisdiction may be asserted based on Internet activities which do not meet the requisite level of interactivity or minimum contacts needed for other tests of personal jurisdiction in Internet cases.

==== "Sliding scale" or "Zippo" test ====
In Zippo Manufacturing Co. v. Zippo Dot Com, Inc. (1997), a federal court held that "the likelihood that general jurisdiction can be constitutionally exercised is directly proportionate to the nature and quality of commercial activity that an entity conducts over the Internet. This sliding scale is consistent with well developed general jurisdiction principles." The "sliding scale" or "Zippo" test has been generally accepted as the standard in federal courts in deciding personal jurisdiction in Internet cases. Such cases are now primarily decided based on a determination of the website's "interactivity". Courts have held that the greater the commercial nature and level of interactivity associated with the website, the more likely it is that the website operator has "purposefully avail[ed] itself" of the forum state's jurisdiction. Interactivity is measured through an examination of the website's features and intended uses. Websites designed to facilitate or conduct business transactions will often be characterized as interactive. In contrast, a passive website that simply makes the information available to the user will be less likely to have a basis for personal jurisdiction. Websites are thus effectively divided into three categories: websites that conduct business over the Internet, websites where users exchange information with the host computers, and websites that do little more than present information. Websites that do business over the Internet will yield a finding of purposeful availment, while websites that simply present information will not. Purposeful availment for the third type is determined by the level of interactivity and its commercial nature.

The Zippo test has been cited by many courts as a standard of analysis for personal jurisdiction with regard to the Internet, but it has also undergone criticism. Zippo provides little guidance as to how much interactivity or commercialism is enough to justify purposeful availment. Furthermore, courts have given little direction as to how those factors interact. Additionally, there is no consideration built into the Zippo test for limiting the number of jurisdictions established. Once a website is sufficiently commercial and interactive beyond a threshold set by a court, jurisdiction may be established with every state.

== Cases interpreting personal jurisdiction involving the Internet within the United States ==
=== Evolution of the case law ===
In the early 1990s, courts struggled with how to treat the Internet with regard to jurisdiction. One of the first noteworthy cases arising in this early stage was Inset Systems, Inc. v. Instruction Set, 937 F. Supp. 161 (D. Conn. 1996). The Inset court likened the company's use of the Internet to a continuous advertisement targeting customers in all states, and established an extraordinarily broad approach for Internet jurisdiction cases. Some early cases followed the Inset approach. For example, the Inset reasoning was cited by the court in Maritz, Inc. v. Cybergold, Inc. (1996) The court in Bensusan Restaurant Corp. v. King (1997), however, deviated from Inset, and established its own more tailored standard. Most notably, the court in Bensusan began looking into the nature of the website in question, holding that the website owned by the defendant was passive in nature. This launched a separate line of reasoning with regard to jurisdiction in Internet cases focused on the specific characteristics of the web, and was cited by Hearst Corp. v. Goldberger.

Within the same year of the Bensusan decision, Zippo Manufacturing Co. v. Zippo Dot Com gave rise to the Zippo test for personal jurisdiction in Internet cases. Cybersell, Inc. v. Cybersell, Inc. (1987) and Mink v. AAAA Development L.L.C. (1997) followed the approach defined by Zippo. However, many cases in the subsequent decade continued to apply the pre-internet Calder test. The courts in Blakey v. Continental Airlines (2000), Dudnikov v. Chalk & Vermilion (2008), and Boschetto v. Hansing (2008) all relied on the Calder standard.

=== Brief summaries of notable cases ===
Pres-Kap, Inc. v. System One, Direct Access, Inc., 636 So.2d 1351 (Fla. App. 3 Dist. 1994).

From New York, Pres-Kap leased System One's computerized airline reservation system that ran off of servers located in Miami, Florida. When Pres-Kap ran into problems with the system, it stopped payment and System One sued for breach of contract in Florida.

The Florida court held that a contract with an out of state party was not enough to establish minimum contacts for personal jurisdiction. The in-state server location was also not enough to establish this. Otherwise, any users of online services could be brought into court wherever the relevant servers happen to be located, which the court found to be an unreasonable result.

Holding: remote usage of server physically located in a forum state is insufficient to establish minimum contacts.

CompuServe, Inc. v. Patterson, 89 F.3d 1257 (6th Cir. 1996).

Patterson, a shareware programmer and resident of Texas, distributed and marketed his shareware through CompuServe's shareware distribution service. When Patterson accused CompuServe of trademark infringement for allegedly selling substantially similar products of their own, CompuServe filed for a declaratory judgment in an Ohio federal district court asking for a declaration that it had not infringed Patterson's trademarks. Patterson replied with a motion to dismiss, claiming lack of personal jurisdiction.

The Sixth Circuit held that Patterson had sufficient contacts to constitute transaction of business in Ohio that would grant an Ohio court personal jurisdiction based on the Ohio long-arm statute. Specifically:
1. Patterson purposefully and repeatedly dealt with an Ohio company.
2. Patterson's CompuServe-based software sales, and CompuServe's alleged infringement occurred in Ohio where CompuServe was based.
3. Patterson's business contract with CompuServe should have given him notice that he might be required to answer lawsuits in Ohio.

Holding: selling software through a company's online service is enough to establish minimum contacts in the state where that company is located.

Inset Systems, Inc. v. Instruction Set, 937 F.Supp. 161 (D. Conn. 1996).

Here, Inset Systems claimed that Instruction Set's website made an infringing use of Inset's registered trademark.

The Connecticut long-arm statute allows for out of state corporations to be sued by residents of Connecticut as long as the out of state corporation has conducted repeated solicitation for business in Connecticut "by mail or otherwise." The court held that this standard was met by Instruction Set's Internet presence, which it found to be at least as much of a case of solicitation as advertising through hard copy mailers and catalogs. The court also found there to be sufficient minimum contacts because Instruction Set should have realized that their nationally available phone number and Internet site could reach potential customers in Connecticut.

Holding: solicitation by advertising through an Internet website is enough to establish minimum contacts anywhere. However, other courts have distanced themselves from this concept. See, e.g., Cybersell, Zippo.

Maritz, Inc. v. Cybergold, Inc., 947 F.Supp. 1328 (E.D. Mo. 1996).

Maritz brought action against Cybergold, seeking an injunction to enjoin alleged trademark infringement on Cybergold's website. Cybergold filed a motion to dismiss for lack of personal jurisdiction.

Missouri's long-arm statute provides for personal jurisdiction over a non-resident defendant that has transacted any business within the state or has committed a tortious act within the state. At common law in Missouri, a tortious act committed outside with a resultant injury within Missouri was sufficient to permit jurisdiction. See Peabody Holding Co. Inc. v. Costain Group PLC, 808 F.Supp. 1425, 1433–34 (E.D.Mo. 1992); May Dep't Stores Co. v. Wilansky, 900 F.Supp. 1154, 1159–60 (E.D.Mo. 1995).

Based on this and the following important factors, the court held that it could exercise personal jurisdiction over Cybergold.
1. nature and quality of contacts with the forum state – Cybergold was advertising and soliciting customers
2. quantity of contacts – Cybergold had made numerous contacts
3. relation of the cause of action to the contacts – Maritz's alleged injuries arose from Cybergold's website
4. interest of the forum state in providing a forum for its residents – interest established where a Missouri corporation's trademark is allegedly being infringed
5. convenience of the parties – Cybergold did not show it would be excessively burdened by the forum

Holding: similar to Inset (solicitation by advertising through an Internet website is enough to establish minimum contacts anywhere).

Bensusan Restaurant Corp. v. King, 126 F.3d 25 (2d Cir. 1997).

In this case, Bensusan Restaurant Corp. claimed that King was infringing on Bensusan's registered trademark "The Blue Note", the name of Bensusan's successful jazz club in New York City, when he created a website for his Missouri club, also called The Blue Note.

New York law allows a non-resident who does not transact business in New York to be sued if the non-resident has committed a tortious act within the state of New York. Since King's website was created by a person physically in Missouri, there was no tortious act in New York and the court held that there was no personal jurisdiction over King.

New York law also allows jurisdiction over non-residents that have caused an injury in the state even if the tortious act was committed outside. However, this is limited to people who should have reasonably expected the act to have consequences in the state, and who derive substantial revenue from interstate commerce, something the court held was not shown here.

Holding: an allegedly trademark-infringing website alone is not sufficient for personal jurisdiction where the website was created by someone physically located in another state.

Hearst Corp. v. Goldberger, 96 Civ 3620, 1997 WL 97097, 1997 U.S. Dist. Lexis 2065 (S.D.N.Y. February 26, 1997).

Hearst Corp., owner of Esquire magazine, brought a trademark infringement action against Goldberger for his "esqwire.com" website. Goldberger had created the website, but had not yet sold any products or services; the extent of his interaction with NY entities was limited to a few emails.

As in Bensusan, the New York long-arm statute allows a non-resident who does not transact business in New York to be sued if the non-resident has committed a tortious act within the state of New York, or if he commits such an act outside of the state with expected harm occurring within the state and he derives substantial revenue from interstate commerce.

The court found that his website amounted to nothing more than an advertisement, and even advertisements targeted at New York have been found inadequate for granting jurisdiction under the transaction of business standard. His emails were analogous to letters or phone calls into New York, which are again insufficient to establish personal jurisdiction. As for the tortious act branch of the long-arm statute, he was not physically within the state of New York when he created the website. Finally, the provision concerning tortious acts committed outside of the state was not applicable because Goldberger had not received any revenue from his website.

Holding: Same as Bensusan. An allegedly trademark-infringing website alone is not sufficient for personal jurisdiction where the website was created by someone physically located in another state.

Zippo Mfg. Co. v. Zippo Dot Com, Inc., 952 F. Supp. 1119 (W.D. Pa. 1997).

In Zippo Manufacturing v. Zippo Dot Com, the court considered state and federal trademark infringement and trademark dilution claims.

The plaintiff was Zippo Manufacturing, famous for their lighters. The defendant, Zippo Dot Com, operated a web portal and news service out of California. Dot Com offered three levels of service, the upper two of which required registration with the website and a payment of monthly fees. Dot Com had approximately 3,000 subscribers in Pennsylvania at the time the suit was commenced.

The Pennsylvania long-arm statute allowed the court to exercise personal jurisdiction for claims arising out of contracts to supply services in the state. The court found that Dot Com had contracts with the 3,000 subscribers and with seven Pennsylvania ISPs. Since Dot Com's website, unlike that in CyberGold, was an active website, garnering money from people in the state where they were being sued, the court held that it could properly exercise personal jurisdiction over the defendant. The court also applied the three part Int'l Shoe test, finding that it could also exercise jurisdiction under that standard.

Holding: A passive webpage is insufficient to establish personal jurisdiction, but an interactive site through which a defendant conducts business with forum residents, such as Zippo Dot Com's, is sufficient to establish personal jurisdiction.

Cybersell, Inc. v. Cybersell, Inc., 130 F.3d 414 (9th Cir. 1997).

Cybersell, Inc. v. Cybersell, Inc. arose out of a claim of trademark infringement.

The plaintiff corporation, in Arizona, sued a Florida corporation who was using the plaintiff's registered trademark on its website. The website created by the defendant was for a small company that advertised its website construction services under the name CyberSell. The website had no "active" parts, and simply offered a number for someone who viewed the webpage to call to get more information about the services offered. They had no toll-free number, only a local Florida number. Furthermore, there was no evidence that they ever advertised in Arizona, or had any contacts with Arizona. The court found that there was no evidence that the defendant's passive webpage purposefully availed itself of Arizona, and that the court could not exercise personal jurisdiction over the defendant.

Holding: Same as Zippo. A passive webpage, such as the one operated by defendant here, is not enough to establish personal jurisdiction.

Mink v. AAAA Development L.L.C., 190 F.3d 333 (5th Cir. 1999).

Plaintiff Mink discussed the possibility of marketing a software product he recently submitted a patent application for with a man named Stark. Stark allegedly shared Mink's ideas with the defendants. Mink brought suit in Texas to claim damages against defendants for conspiring to duplicate his software in violation of his patent-pending rights. Mink was a Texas resident, whereas defendants were based in Vermont. To the knowledge of the court, defendants had no dealings with Texas. The United States District Court for the Southern District of Texas dismissed the case for lack of personal jurisdiction. Plaintiff filed a motion for reconsideration, alleging that the defendant's website fulfilled the minimum contacts requirement for personal jurisdiction. The Fifth Circuit affirmed the trial court's decision, applying the Zippo test. It held that the defendant's website, which did not accept online orders, was little more than passive advertisement. The court held that without greater interactivity between the website and the residents of Texas, personal jurisdiction would not be appropriate.

Holding: Same as Zippo. A passive webpage, such as defendants' here, is not enough to establish personal jurisdiction.

Blakey v. Continental Airlines, 751 A.2d 538 (NJ 2000).

Plaintiff Blakey filed suit against defendants for defamation, sexual harassment, and hostile work environment based on defamatory statements published by defendants on the company's web-forum. The court reversed a dismissal based upon lack of personal jurisdiction granted by the lower court.

The court in this case applied the "minimum contacts" principle set forth by International Shoe and the "effects" test set forth by Calder. It held that the defendants' statements were published with the knowledge or purpose of causing harm to the plaintiff in the forum state of New Jersey, and that this satisfied the "minimum contacts" requirement for proper jurisdiction.

Holding: Personal jurisdiction for claims regarding a website require application of the Calder test to establish "minimum contacts" as defined by Int'l Shoe.

Twentieth Cent. Fox Film Corp. v. iCraveTV, 53 U.S.P.Q.2d 1831 (W.D. Pa. 2000).

iCraveTV was a Canadian Internet startup that offered real time streaming of television over the Internet. Twentieth Century Fox brought suit against the startup for copyright infringement. Twentieth Century Fox obtained an injunction against iCraveTV from broadcasting within the United States. The United States court asserted jurisdiction over the Canadian company with significant ease, utilizing the United States registrant address attached to the company's website domain name. After issuance of the restraining order, iCraveTV decided to settle the lawsuit and discontinue its streaming service.

Holding: The United States has used a foreign company's website domain registration in the U.S. as justification for personal jurisdiction.

Yahoo! Inc. v. La Ligue Contre Le Racisme et l'antisemitisme, 433 F.3d 1199 (9th Cir. 2006) (en banc).

In Yahoo! Inc. v. La Ligue Contre Le Racisme et l'antisemitisme (LICRA), the Ninth Circuit applied the Calder test to find that a California court could properly establish specific personal jurisdiction in a declaratory judgment action against two French civil rights organizations suing Yahoo! and Yahoo! France over the availability of Nazi content to French users of its services. Under the threat of substantial financial penalty, the French Court ordered Yahoo! in two interim orders to take "all necessary measures to dissuade and render impossible" access within France to sites displaying Nazi paraphernalia or other anti-Semitic content, and directed Yahoo! France to display an interstitial warning to users in France prior to enabling their access to Yahoo.com. While Yahoo! France substantially complied with the orders, Yahoo! resisted the French court's efforts to dictate changes to its US-based services. (Yahoo! later adopted a policy change addressing many of the French complaints, allegedly for independent reasons.)

In reviewing Yahoo's claim for declaratory relief, the Court applied a three-part version of the Calder test to determine if the effects of LICRA's action were sufficiently directed at California to establish personal jurisdiction, including whether the defendant: 1. committed an intentional act; 2. expressly aimed at the forum state, and 3. causing harm that the defendant knows is likely to be suffered in the forum state. Focusing on the French Court's orders, the Ninth Circuit found that compliance would require Yahoo! to perform significant acts in California as the servers supporting yahoo.com, which would have to be modified for compliance, were located in that state, thus fulfilling the first two prongs of the test. Although the penalties contained within the orders had not been enforced and the companies were in substantial compliance, the court found that the threat of future enforcement and the "very existence" of the orders constituted "harm" under the third requirement of the Calder test.

Holding: Personal jurisdiction under the Calder test can be established where a defendant's foreign court orders require modifying data located on servers in the forum state and the threat of financial penalty for not performing the modifications constitutes harm. Note, however, that the court ordered the case dismissed because three of the judges (that believed personal jurisdiction was established) also believed that the case was not yet ripe and three other judges believed the court lacked personal jurisdiction, yielding a majority that favored dismissal, albeit for different reasons.

Dudnikov v. Chalk & Vermilion, 514 F.3d 1063 (10th Cir. 2008).

The Tenth Circuit overturned a dismissal granted by the District Court of Colorado due to lack of personal jurisdiction in a case involving a copyright dispute over an eBay auction. The Court applied a five-part test that asked:
1. whether the defendants have committed an intentional action
2. that the action was expressly aimed at the forum state
3. that defendants had knowledge that the brunt of the injury would be felt in the forum state
4. that the plaintiff's injuries arose out of the defendant's forum related activities
5. and that traditional notions of fair play and substantial justice are not offended.
The court decided that there existed specific jurisdiction over the defendants due to their interactions with the plaintiffs via the Internet services operated by eBay.

Holding: Personal jurisdiction is established if the criteria of the Calder test are met.

Boschetto v. Hansing, 539 F.3d 1011 (9th Cir. 2008).

Plaintiff Boschetto, a resident of California, purchased a vintage car through eBay from defendant car dealership in Wisconsin. Upon receiving the car, plaintiff discovered many problems with the car which were counter to how the defendant described it. After failing to resolve the issue through eBay, plaintiff brought suit in the United States District Court for the Northern District of California. The District Court granted a motion to dismiss for lack of personal jurisdiction and the Ninth Circuit affirmed this decision. The court specifically rejected the reasoning of Cybersell, effectively refusing to apply the Zippo test. Instead, the court applied a three-part test for establishing minimum contacts: (1) purposeful direction of activities toward the forum, (2) a claim arising out of or related to defendant's forum related activities, and (3) reasonableness, fair-play, and substantial justice. The court ruled that the lone transaction for the sale of one item did not establish purposeful availment.

Holding: The Ninth Circuit departed from the Zippo test and held that specific jurisdiction is found by "minimum contact" through a three-part test: purposeful direction, a forum related claim, and fairness.

Attaway v. Omega, No. 11A01-0712-CV-608 (Ind. Ct. App. March 13, 2009).

Defendants purchased a used car from plaintiffs through eBay. The auction stated that winners must make their own delivery arrangements. After the completed transaction, defendants filed a claim to rescind payment because they alleged that the car was not as described, and succeeded in doing so through MasterCard. Plaintiffs brought suit for damages, and the defendants moved to dismiss for lack of personal jurisdiction. The motion was denied in the lower court, and the Indiana Court of Appeals affirmed the judgment. The court noted that this case may be the first case within which an eBay seller sued a buyer for rescission of payment after the item had been picked up in the seller's state.

The court applied the minimum contacts rule outlined by Int'l Shoe as well as the purposeful availment principle from Burger King Corp. v. Rudzewicz, which aligns with the Calder test. It also rejected the Zippo test, declaring that eBay controls the interactivity of the website and not the seller. The court cites Boschetto for its similar fact pattern, but distinguishes itself because the transaction in the present case went beyond the single online purchase of Boschetto. Rather, the defendants had notice that their bid would result in an agreement to appear in Indiana to obtain the vehicle, whether in person or by representative. The court thus ruled that this qualified as a purposeful availment of the privileges of the forum state on the part of the defendants, and that jurisdiction was proper.

Holding: Personal jurisdiction is established through "minimum contacts" and purposeful availment by appearing (even through an agent) in the forum state to pick up an item sold through the Internet.

Huggins v. Boyd, Georgia Court of Appeals 2010 (304 Ga. App. 563) In this case involving a permanent protective order prohibiting Jonathan Huggins from stalking Karen Boyd, Huggins appealed the trial court's denial of his motion to set aside the order, arguing that the trial court had no personal jurisdiction over him. Because it was undisputed that Huggins (a South Carolina resident) engaged in the stalking conduct (sending e-mails) only outside Georgia, and because it was further undisputed that Huggins engaged in no other conduct (persistent or otherwise) in Georgia, the protective order was reversed.

== See also ==
- Personal jurisdiction
