= Toys "R" Us, Inc. v. Step Two, S.A =

U.S. court case

Toys "R" Us, Inc. v. Step Two, S.A.
- Court: United States Court of Appeals for the Third Circuit
- Full case name: Toys "R" Us, Inc., et al. v. Step Two, S.A, et al.
- Decided: January 27, 2003
- Citations: 318 F.3d 446 (3rd Cir, 2003)

Case history
- Appealed from: United States District Court for the District of New Jersey

Court membership
- Judges sitting: Samuel Alito, Julio M. Fuentes, Louis F. Oberdorfer

Case opinions
- Court determined that Toys "R" Us be allowed jurisdictional discovery to determine whether jurisdiction was applicable. The case was to be remanded, allowing for new information provided by said jurisdictional discovery.
- Decision by: Judge Oberdorfer

Keywords
- Minimum contact, Personal jurisdiction

Toys "R" Us, Inc. v. Step Two, S.A was a case in the United States Court of Appeals for the Third Circuit which set precedent in this circuit for its application of the "Zippo" test in determining the validity of a claim to personal jurisdiction based on the interactivity of a website. This case was presented as an appeal to a ruling from the District Court which denied Toys "R" Us' request for jurisdictional discovery and dismissed the case over lack of personal jurisdiction. The appellate court held that the denial of jurisdictional discovery was in error, and remanded the case to be reconsidered once this discovery took place.

== Background ==
Imaginarium Toy Centers, Inc. was a U.S. toy company in the 1980s and 1990s that owned U.S. trademarks for the name "Imaginarium". Step Two, a Spanish educational toy company, independently owned and operated a franchise of toy stores called Imaginarium throughout Spain as well as nine other countries. Step Two also owned the "Imaginarium" trademark, albeit in Spain as well as the other countries where their stores were located.

During the mid-1990s, Imaginarium Toy Centers and Step Two began registering domains that advertised and sold toys in their respective Imaginarium lines. By 2000, Step Two had registered the domain names imaginarium.es, imaginariumworld.com, imaginarium-world.com, imaginariumnet.com, imaginariumnet.net, imaginariumnet.org. In August 1999, Toys "R" Us purchased Imaginarium Toy Centers, acquiring all of the trademarks and web domains they had previously registered.

While Step Two maintained no advertising, franchises, or businesses in the United States, similarities existed in logo design and the line of products offered by Toys "R" Us and Step Two under their respective Imaginarium trademarks, such as the similarity of the blue rectangular logo at the website imaginarium.es. Also, Step Two's stores allegedly had the same "unique facade" as Toys R Us’ Imaginarium stores. Step Two did have contact with the United States since some of the toys sold in their stores were bought from American vendors. Additionally, Step Two's president, Felix Tena, traveled annually to New York for the New York Toy Fair. Step Two also maintained a set of websites based on their Imaginarium trademark.

On February 7, 2001, Toys "R" Us filed a complaint alleging that Step Two's Imaginarium websites infringed upon Toys "R" Us' US trademark for Imaginarium. Both this court case and the District Court case summarized below arose from this allegation.

=== District Court case ===
The complaint filed by Toys "R" Us on February 7, 2001, was submitted in a New Jersey court and cited both the Lanham Act as well as New Jersey law. On April 10, 2001, Step Two filed to dismiss this complaint over lack of personal jurisdiction in New Jersey. Toys "R" Us opposed the dismissal and requested jurisdictional discovery. At the time of the suit, the Imaginarium sites maintained by Step Two were exclusively in the Spanish language and the price of items were shown only in local currencies (pesetas or euros). Moreover, items available online were only supposed to be shipped to countries where stores were actually located.

At the hearing on July 30, 2001, Toys "R" Us argued that the federal district court in New Jersey had personal jurisdiction based on the interactive nature of Step Two's websites. Furthermore, they had evidence of two New Jersey residents (both on the Toys "R" Us legal team) ordering and receiving items bought from the site. Lastly, the Spanish language of the site enabled Spanish-speakers in the United States to access the site and was purposefully directing itself towards an American audience. The court held that the premise of an interactive website alone did not qualify for personal jurisdiction. Should that hold true, all interactive websites would be open to jurisdiction in all territories with internet access. Neither the language of the site, nor evidence of the transactions between Step Two and New Jersey were accepted by the court as proof of deliberate actions of Step Two in the United States. Specifically, the circumstances surrounding the transactions made in New Jersey to receive goods from the websites came under scrutiny. One Toys "R" Us employee in New Jersey originated the order and had it shipped to another Toys "R" Us employee in Madrid before he forwarded it to New Jersey as a personal package. The court ruled that such a transaction did not prove jurisdiction over Step Two. In conclusion, the court denied Toys "R" Us' judicial discovery and granted the dismissal. Toys "R" Us appealed on August 28, 2001.

== Legal analysis ==
=== Issue ===
The focus of the court in this case was on two aspects:

1. Whether personal jurisdiction in New Jersey should be given over Step Two in its maintenance of the allegedly infringing website, and, if not
2. Whether the district court's denial of jurisdictional discovery was appropriate or not.

=== Personal jurisdiction ===
==== Zippo Test ====
Like many of the courts before it, the circuit court applied the Zippo test to determine whether the interactivity of Step Two's website opened it to personal jurisdiction in New Jersey. From the arguments in the proceedings, Step Two's website, while falling in the middle ground of the test as an interactive website, did not deliberately conduct business in the target state. With regards to evaluating defendant's minimum contacts with the forum jurisdiction the court conceded that while the online activities of Step Two did not qualify for personal jurisdiction, the contact and activity of Step Two outside of the Internet context must also be taken into account. Minimum contacts is required to establish jurisdiction under Due Process Clause of the Fifth Amendment.

=== Jurisdictional discovery ===
The court determined that the motive behind Toys "R" Us filing a request for judicial discovery was to investigate whether the activities conducted by Step Two both on- and offline could subject them to either personal jurisdiction or the long-arm jurisdiction of the court. They believed that the district court erred in denying this request for judicial discovery, claiming that they focused too narrowly on just the information related to the infringing website (instead of Step Two as a whole), and, in doing so, excluded possible evidence that might show "something more" to satisfy minimum contacts for personal jurisdiction.

== Ruling ==
While the limited evidence offered by Toys "R" Us did not sufficiently establish personal jurisdiction over Step Two, this court believed that more evidence was likely to be uncovered through jurisdictional discovery. The circuit court disagreed with the reasoning of the district court that the case should be focused only on the actions and infringement of the website, and not the actions of Step Two's personnel outside of the website in question. The circuit court determined that the request for discovery was justified as a means to further determine whether or not the actions and business plans of Step Two (as a whole) fall under the personal jurisdiction or long-arm jurisdiction of the court. The court therefore reversed the district court's denial for jurisdictional discovery, vacated the motion to dismiss, and "remand[ed] the case for limited jurisdictional discovery guided by the foregoing analysis, and for reconsideration of jurisdiction with the benefit of the product of that discovery".

== See also ==
- Minimum contacts
- Personal jurisdiction in Internet cases in the United States
- Zippo Manufacturing Co. v. Zippo Dot Com, Inc.
