= Illinois v. Hemi Group LLC =

2010 personal jurisdiction case

Illinois v. Hemi Group, LLC
- Court: United States Court of Appeals for the Seventh Circuit
- Full case name: State of Illinois, ex. rel. Lisa Madigan, Attorney General of the State of Illinois v. Hemi Group, LLC
- Decided: September 14, 2010
- Citation: 622 F.3d 754

Case history
- Prior history: C.D. Ill.

Holding
- The Seventh Circuit affirmed the district court's denial of Hemi's motion to dismiss for lack of personal jurisdiction, finding that Internet transactions of cigarettes sufficed to establish personal jurisdiction over Hemi in Illinois.

Court membership
- Judges sitting: William J. Bauer, Michael Stephen Kanne, Terence T. Evans

Case opinions
- Majority: Kanne

Keywords
- Civil procedure; Cyberlaw; Minimum contacts; Personal jurisdiction; Personal jurisdiction in Internet cases in the United States; Purposeful availment

Illinois v. Hemi Group, LLC, 622 F.3d 754 (7th Cir. 2010), was a personal jurisdiction case in which the United States Court of Appeals for the Seventh Circuit affirmed the United States District Court for the Central District of Illinois' ruling finding personal jurisdiction based on Internet transactions. In the initial filing, the state of Illinois sued Hemi Group LLC (Hemi) for selling cigarettes to Illinois residents over the Internet in violation of state law and for failing to report those sales in violation of federal law. Hemi moved to dismiss the suit for lack of personal jurisdiction, but the district court found that the Internet transactions provided a basis for Hemi to be sued in Illinois.

== Facts ==
Hemi, based out of New Mexico and without any ties to Illinois, sold discount cigarettes through several websites. Customers could place orders online or through fax, mail, or telephone. Illinois alleged that Hemi sold cigarettes to Illinois residents via its websites, though the only sale Illinois identified in its complaint was instigated by a special agent of the Illinois Department of Revenue.

On several of its websites, Hemi stated that it would not sell cigarettes to New York residents due to ongoing litigation there, but no exception was made to Illinois residents. Hemi's website directed customers to check with their respective states to determine the amount, if any, of state taxes associated with their order.

Specifically, Illinois sued Hemi in Illinois state court for:

- Failing to comply with the Jenkins Act by not providing monthly reports of sales to Illinois residents;
- Violating the Prevention Act by shipping cigarettes to Illinois residents that were not licensed distributors or export warehouse operators; and
- Violating the Enforcement Act and the Consumer Fraud Act by selling brands of cigarettes to Illinois residents that were not in the Illinois Directory.

== Procedural history ==
Hemi removed the suit from Illinois state court to federal district court and moved to dismiss the case for lack of personal jurisdiction. The district court found that Illinois could not exercise general jurisdiction over Hemi because Hemi lacked the "continuous and systematic general business contacts" to satisfy general jurisdiction. However, the district court held that Hemi could be amenable to specific jurisdiction, finding that Hemi purposefully availed itself of the opportunity of doing business with Illinois residents and that exercising personal jurisdiction over Hemi would not offend due process.

For a more in-depth discussion of the concept of personal jurisdiction and its sub-concepts of general and specific jurisdiction, see personal jurisdiction and International Shoe doctrine

=== Issue on appeal ===
The question on appeal before the Seventh Circuit was whether the Illinois district court could properly exercise personal jurisdiction over Hemi.

== Holding ==
The Seventh Circuit affirmed the district court's denial of Hemi's motion to dismiss for lack of personal jurisdiction, finding that Internet transactions of cigarettes sufficed to establish personal jurisdiction over Hemi in Illinois.

== Analysis ==
=== Federal vs. Illinois due process standards ===
Hemi argued that a line of Illinois appellate opinions demonstrated that Illinois law required more than federal law with regard to satisfying due process standards for personal jurisdiction. The Seventh Circuit rejected this argument, finding that none of the cases cited by Hemi even suggested a meaningful difference between the federal and Illinois due process standards, and that at least one of the cases cited by Hemi only discussed the distinction in the theoretical context. Though the Seventh Circuit noted that the district court may only exercise jurisdiction only if both federal and state constitutional elements are satisfied, it also stated that it was unaware of cases where personal jurisdiction could be satisfied under the U.S. Constitution, but not under the Illinois Constitution. Hence, the Seventh Circuit limited its analysis as to whether exercising personal jurisdiction over Hemi would comport with the federal guarantee of due process.

=== Minimum contacts and traditional notions of fair play and substantial justice ===
Drawing from International Shoe Co. v. Washington, the Seventh Circuit began by noting that personal jurisdiction may be proper where a defendant has certain minimum contacts that do not violate "traditional notions of fair play and substantial justice." Relevant to this analysis are the following factors:

- Contacts with the forum state should not be "fortuitous"; the defendant must have purposefully established minimum contacts; and
- The defendant should "reasonably anticipate" being brought to court in the forum state because the defendant purposefully availed itself of the privilege of conducting activities there.

=== Application ===
==== Minimum contacts ====
Here, the Seventh Circuit found that Hemi's contacts with Illinois were sufficient to satisfy due process. The court noted that Hemi maintained "commercial websites" that customers could use to create accounts, purchase cigarettes, and calculate shipping charges based on their ZIP codes.

The Seventh Circuit rejected Hemi's argument that it did not purposefully avail itself of doing business in Illinois. Hemi stated on its website that it would ship to any state except New York. The court observed that Hemi's reluctance to ship to New York was important for two reasons:

1. It indicated that Hemi was "ready and willing" to do business with Illinois residents; and
2. It demonstrated that Hemi knew that conducting business with residents of a particular state could subject it to jurisdiction there, and that Hemi therefore knew how to protect itself from being subject to personal jurisdiction to specific states.

Hence, the court reasoned that Hemi's decision not to do business with New York indicated that it should have foreseen being brought to court in Illinois for selling cigarettes to Illinois residents.

The Seventh Circuit also rejected Hemi's argument that its sales to Illinois customers were due to the unilateral actions by customers. The court found that Hemi, via its several commercial and interactive websites, reached out to Illinois residents to sell cigarettes, and therefore minimum contacts was satisfied. ("It is Hemi reaching out to residents of Illinois, and not the residents reaching back, that creates the sufficient minimum contacts with Illinois that justify exercising personal jurisdiction over Hemi in Illinois.")

=== Zippo sliding scale test rejected ===
In Zippo Manufacturing Co. v. Zippo Dot Com, Inc., 952 F. Supp. 1119 (W.D. Pa. 1997), the U.S. District Court for the Western District of Pennsylvania laid out a "sliding scale" test for determining specific personal jurisdiction based on the level of Internet interactivity. The Zippo court noted that websites can fall under three general categories:

1. Passive. Defendants maintaining passive websites would generally not be subject to personal jurisdiction because such websites only provide information;
2. Interactive. In this so-called "middle ground," exercise of jurisdiction in the "interactive" context is determined by examining the level of interactivity and the commercial nature of the site; or
3. Integral. At this end of spectrum, defendants maintaining websites "integral" to their business (i.e., processing orders to sell goods) would subject them to personal jurisdiction.

The Seventh Circuit noted that, though sister circuits have adopted the Zippo sliding scale test, the Seventh Circuit had expressly declined to do so. Citing Tamburo v. Dworkin, 601 F.3d 693, 703 (7th. Cir. 2010), the court stated that it was reluctant "to fashion a special jurisdictional test for Internet-based cases." The Hemi Court reasoned that "the traditional due process inquiry . . . is not so difficult to apply to cases involving Internet contacts that courts need some sort of easier-to-apply categorical test."

=== Relatedness ===
The Seventh Circuit further found that specific jurisdiction over Hemi was proper because Illinoi's claims arose out of Hemi's contacts with Illinois. The Court explained that Hemi sold and shipped cigarettes to Illinois residents, thus "trigger[ing] Illinois's claims against it." Though the cigarette sales technically occurred in New Mexico, the Court reasoned that Illinois's suit was based on allegations that Hemi violated Illinois state law and federal law by failing to report its sales, not whether there was a contract between Hemi and its Illinois customers.

=== Fairness ===
The Seventh Circuit further observed that jurisdiction over Hemi would be proper only if, as noted in International Shoe Co. v. Washington, exercising jurisdiction "does not offend traditional notions of fair play and substantial justice."

Factors relevant to the fair play and substantial justice analysis include:

1. The burden on the defendant;
2. The forum state's interest in adjudicating the dispute;
3. The plaintiff's interest in obtaining convenient and effective relief;
4. The interstate judicial system's interest in obtaining the most efficient resolution of the underlying dispute; and
5. The shared interest of the several states in furthering fundamental substantive social policies.

In evaluating the above factors, the Seventh Circuit explained that it applies a sliding scale test: "the weaker the defendant's contacts with the forum state are, the less likely it is that exercising jurisdiction over that defendant is appropriate."

Applying those factors to this case, the Seventh Circuit found that exercising jurisdiction over Hemi in Illinois would be fair because:

- Hemi maintained a "sophisticated" and "expansive" online venture;
- Hemi "held itself out to conduct business nationwide";
- Hemi was "apparently successful in reaching customers across the country";
- Hemi limited its exposure to lawsuits by refusing to make sales to certain states (namely, New York).

Though defending the suit in Illinois might be burdensome on Hemi, the Seventh Circuit reasoned that Illinois courts had a strong interest in resolving a dispute that involved the state as a party. Moreover, because Illinois law would be applied, the Court also observed that it would be most convenient for Illinois to have the suit adjudicated in an Illinois court. The Court also noted that "Hemi wants to have its cake and eat it, too: it wants the benefit of a nationwide business model with none of the exposure. There is nothing constitutionally unfair about allowing Illinois, a state with which Hemi has had sufficient minimum contacts, to exercise personal jurisdiction over Hemi."

== Reaction ==
After Hemi, several law firms warned businesses that selling products on the Internet could potentially make them liable for suit anywhere in the United States. For instance, several law firms cautioned clients that, although Hemi "involved a cigarettes retailer, its rationale could be applied to all Internet retailers." Other commentators observed that the Seventh Circuit's decision in Hemi reflected a "trend away from relying on interactivity of a website as a sole determinant of personal jurisdiction, looking instead toward the more relevant concept of targeting." Moreover, following the Hemi decision, several lawyers began advising clients to include a forum selection clause in their websites' user agreements to at least have the possibility of transferring a lawsuit to their home state.

== See also ==
=== General information ===
- Personal jurisdiction in internet cases in the United States
- Minimum contacts
- Legal aspects of computing
- Cyberlaw
- Personal jurisdiction
- Civil procedure

=== Cases ===
- Zippo Manufacturing Co. v. Zippo Dot Com, Inc.
- International Shoe Co. v. Washington
- Hemi Group LLC v. City of New York *Note: This is the litigation Hemi referenced as the reasoning behind explicitly denying business with New York residents. In this case, on January 25, 2010 the US Supreme Court held that New York City cannot use the RICO Act to collect damages from non-New York internet vendors who fail to pay New York City cigarette taxes.

=== Law journal articles ===
- Piercing Pennoyer with the Sword of a Thousand Truths: Jurisdictional Issues in the Virtual World by Andrew Cabasso, Intellectual Property, Media & Entertainment Law Journal, Fordham University School of Law
- The Future of Cybertravel: Legal Implications of the Evasion of Geolocation by Marketa Trimble, Intellectual Property, Media & Entertainment Law Journal, Fordham University School of Law
- How Technologically Savvy Do You Have to Be to Apply Zippo ?: An Approach to Internet Personal Jurisdiction After Fancaster and Edvisors by Joshua Beldner, Boston University Journal of Science & Technology Law
- Personal Jurisdiction and Choice of Law by Stewart E. Sterk, Iowa Law Review
