= Cybersell, Inc. v. Cybersell, Inc. =

Trademark infringement case

- Court: United States Court of Appeals for the Ninth Circuit
- Decided: Dec. 2, 1997
- Citation: 130 F.3d 414

Case history
- Prior action: United States District Court for the District of Arizona granted the defendant's motion for dismissal for lack of personal jurisdiction.

Holding
- The order granting Cybersell FL's motion to dismiss for lack of personal jurisdiction was affirmed because appellees' use of a webpage name was passive and did not constitute commercial activity within the state; appellees had not purposefully availed themselves such that they could expect to be subject to the court's jurisdiction.

Court membership
- Judges sitting: Harlington Wood, Jr., Pamela Ann Rymer, A. Wallace Tashima

Keywords
- Personal jurisdiction in internet cases in the United States Personal jurisdiction

Cybersell, Inc. v. Cybersell, Inc. was a trademark infringement case based on the use of an internet service mark. The United States District Court for the District of Arizona was asked to review whether the allegedly infringing use of a service mark in a home page on the World Wide Web suffices for personal jurisdiction in the state where the holder of the mark has its principal place of business. The Cybersell holding illustrated that passive websites (i.e. sites that serve only to publish information, rather than to engage in commercial activity or collect information from a user) do not establish personal jurisdiction outside the state in which they are based.

== Facts of the case ==
Plaintiff Cybersell, Inc. ("Cybersell AZ"), an Arizona corporation with principals Laurence Canter and Martha Siegel, was incorporated in May 1994 providing advertisements for commercial services over the Internet. In August 1994, Cybersell AZ filed an application to register the name "Cybersell" as a service mark, and was approved for trademark registration using cyber.sell.com in October 1995. In February 1995, the site was then taken down for reconstruction.

In May 1995, while Cybersell AZ was in the process of registering as a federal service mark, Cybersell, Inc. ("Cybersell FL"), a Florida corporation formed “to provide business consulting services for strategic management and marketing on the web” established a website advertising its services at cybsell.com. Cybersell FL used their website to provide contact information for their business, including their phone number and email address.

After Cybersell AZ learned of Cybersell FL's website and use of their "Cybersell" service mark, Cybersell AZ notified Cybersell FL that they were infringing on Cybersell AZ's mark. As a result, Cybersell FL changed their name to WebHorizons, and later to WebSolvers, Inc., "to disassociate themselves" from Cybersell AZ; however, they left "Welcome to Cybersell!" on their web page.

Cybersell AZ then filed the complaint in this action, alleging trademark infringement, unfair competition, fraud, and Racketeer Influenced and Corrupt Organizations Act (RICO) violations in the United States District Court for the District of Arizona. Cybersell AZ alleged that personal jurisdiction over Cybersell FL was proper because the internet is without borders, and a website which advertises a product or service is necessarily intended for use on a worldwide basis. Cybersell FL moved to dismiss for lack of personal jurisdiction. The court granted the motion and Cybersell AZ appealed.

== Opinion ==
The court applied the “minimum contacts” test to determine whether the court could exercise specific personal jurisdiction over a nonresident defendant: "(1) The nonresident defendant must do some act or consummate some transaction with the forum or perform some act by which he purposefully avails himself of the privilege of conducting activities in the forum, thereby invoking the benefits and protections[;] (2) the claim must be one which arises out of or results from the defendant's forum-related activities[; and] (3) exercise of jurisdiction must be reasonable."

The court determined that Cybersell FL's conduct did not amount to purposeful availment under the first prong of the minimum contacts test. The court looked to its discussion of purposeful availment in Ballard v. Savage, noting that the “‘purposeful availment’ requirement is satisfied if the defendant has taken deliberate action within the forum state or if he has created continuing obligations to forum residents. ‘It is not required that a defendant be physically present within, or have physical contacts with the forum, provided that his efforts ‘are purposefully directed’ toward forum residents.’”

Having yet to rule on personal jurisdiction “in the context of cyberspace” the court looked to Second and Sixth Circuit decisions for guidance, namely CompuServe, Inc. v. Patterson and Bensusan Restaurant Corp. v. King. In CompuServe, the court ruled that the defendant purposefully availed himself of the privilege of doing business in Ohio when the defendant transmitted his product from Texas to CompuServe's system in Ohio, and the system provided access to his software to others to whom he advertised and sold his product. In contrast, the defendant in Bensusan created a general access web page containing information about its service and ticketing information. The court ruled that the defendant's action did not amount to purposeful availment, rather was just passive web page and did not subject the defendant to personal jurisdiction.

The Ninth Circuit determined that Cybersell FL only passively advertised on the internet using the name “Cybersell” and did not deliberately direct merchandising efforts toward Arizona residents. The court found that Cybersell FL did nothing to encourage people in Arizona to access its site, no Arizona residents signed up for Cybersell FL's web construction services, and that there were no sales, no telephone calls, no income, no message, and no "hits" from Arizonans (other than by Cybersell AZ). Moreover, Cybersell FL did not have an “800” number. In sum, Cybersell FL had done no act and consummated no transaction, nor had it performed any act by which it purposefully availed itself of the privilege of conducting activities, in Arizona, thereby invoking the benefits and protections of Arizona law. Cybersell FL lacked sufficient minimum contacts with Arizona for personal jurisdiction. Accordingly, its motion to dismiss for lack of personal jurisdiction was properly granted.

The court also set aside Cybersell AZ's argument that the Calder “effects” test provided grounds for personal jurisdiction because Cybersell AZ did not suffer harm in a particular geographic location in the same sense that an individual would. Cybersell FL's web page simply was not aimed intentionally at Arizona knowing that harm was likely to be caused there to Cybersell AZ.

== See also ==
- Zippo Manufacturing Co. v. Zippo Dot Com, Inc.
- Personal jurisdiction in Internet cases in the United States
