= Territorial jurisdiction (United States) =

Territorial jurisdiction

Territorial jurisdiction in United States law refers to a court's power over events and persons within the bounds of a particular geographic territory. If a court does not have territorial jurisdiction over the events or persons within it, then the court cannot bind the defendant to an obligation or adjudicate any rights involving them. Territorial jurisdiction is to be distinguished from subject-matter jurisdiction, which is the power of a court to render a judgment concerning a certain subject matter, or personal jurisdiction, which is the power of a court to render a judgment concerning particular persons, wherever they may be. Personal jurisdiction, territorial jurisdiction, subject-matter jurisdiction, and proper notice to the defendant are prerequisites for a valid judgment.

== The types of territorial jurisdiction ==
=== Types of jurisdictional territory within the international system ===
- Incorporated national territory, within which all residents are considered American citizens.
- Unincorporated national territory. This can include territories in which the residents do not have full rights.
- Trust territories or dependencies. These are territories with some of the attributes of a nation-state but not full independence, administered by a nation, perhaps with international sanction.
- Occupied territories. These are usually the result of war and conquest, and ruled by martial law imposed by the conqueror.
- International commons. Territory not under the jurisdiction of any nation, but open to use by all, subject to treaty restrictions. This includes the high seas beyond coastal territorial limits, Antarctica, and Outer Space.
- National flag vessels at sea. The vessel is considered to be part of the territory of the nation whose flag it flies, and subject to the laws of that nation. A vessel without a national flag may be considered a stateless vessel. A stateless vessel is, on the high seas, not subject to any State's exclusive jurisdiction.
- Diplomatic grounds. The grounds of foreign embassies and some consulates, like vessels at sea, are considered part of the territory of the nation they represent. Contrary to popular belief, however, diplomatic missions do not enjoy full extraterritorial status and are not sovereign territory of the represented state. Rather, the premises of diplomatic missions remain under the jurisdiction of the host state while being afforded special privileges (such as immunity from most local laws) by the Vienna Convention on Diplomatic Relations.
- Foreign military bases. Like diplomatic facilities, they may or may not constitute territory of the nation whose forces are stationed there, depending on a status of forces agreement.
- Extraterritorial jurisdiction. This is asserted by most nations over their military and diplomatic personnel while abroad, and by some nations over subjects like piracy and offenses against the law of nations, such as "crimes against humanity" or genocide, or taxation of income of citizens obtained from foreign sources.

=== Types of jurisdictional territory within a nation ===
This will vary from one nation to another, but we can illustrate the types by examining the United States, and how there can be different territorial jurisdiction for different subjects:

- Territories over which the central government has exclusive jurisdiction for a broad range of subjects. Created by U.S. Constitution, Art. I Sec. 8 Cl. 17.
- Territories over which the state government has exclusive jurisdiction for a broad range of subjects. State territory excluding territory ceded under Art. I Sec. 8 Cl. 17.
- Unincorporated territories over which the central government has exclusive jurisdiction under Art. IV Sec. 3 Cl. 2.
- State territory over which the central government has jurisdiction, either exclusive or concurrent, on a few specific subjects.
- County territory within which the county government has exclusive or concurrent jurisdiction with the state.
- Township territory within which the town government has exclusive or concurrent jurisdiction with the county or state.
- Federal judicial districts within which the court for that district has exclusive jurisdiction.
- State or local judicial districts within which the court for that district has exclusive jurisdiction.
- Neighborhood associations that may exercise townlike powers over their neighborhoods.
- Administrative district territories, with powers to make rules and adjudicate cases concerning things like utilities, transportation facilities, etc.

== Constitutional limits ==
The Supreme Court of the United States has held that constitutional requirements of due process limit the exercise of subject or personal jurisdiction beyond territorial limits. The same outer territorial boundaries for subject jurisdiction apply in both state courts and federal courts. Moreover, because of Rule 4 of the Federal Rules of Civil Procedure (FRCP 4), a federal court ordinarily applies the personal jurisdiction statutes (e.g., long-arm statutes) of the state in which it sits, even when the state has not extended personal jurisdiction to its territorial limits. (Some states, such as California, have long-arm statutes that give their courts personal jurisdiction to the extent constitutionally permitted.) In some exceptional circumstances, FRCP 4 grants a federal court personal jurisdiction when the law of the state in which it sits would not.

Territorial jurisdiction problems are acute in cases involving business transactions conducted across state lines, where the defendant may not have set foot in the other state, but still conducted affairs with the other state's residents through correspondence, the shipment of goods, or indirect agents. Even more difficult, and more unsettled, territorial jurisdiction issues arise in stream of commerce cases. In the quintessential stream of commerce case, a defendant in one state sells a widget to a manufacturer in the same state, which incorporates the widget into a retail product and sells it to a consumer in another state, who then sues claiming injury from the widget. The leading Supreme Court stream of commerce case resulted in a split, failing to clarify the issue.

Internet cases raise several troublesome territorial jurisdiction problems. For example, a website may be viewed anywhere in the world, though it is hosted in Anguilla and operated by a California citizen. Courts must decide in which locations, under what circumstances, the exercise of territorial jurisdiction over the citizen for claims arising from the website comports with traditional notions of fair play and substantial justice. For more, see Personal jurisdiction in internet cases.

== Relationship to venue ==
Venue and territorial jurisdiction are closely related for practical purposes. A change of venue may be sought either within the territorial jurisdiction of a court, or with the consent of the receiving jurisdiction and the parties, within the jurisdiction of another court, provided it has jurisdiction over the same laws.

== See also ==
- Special Maritime and Territorial Jurisdiction of the United States
