= Attaway v. Omega =

- Court: Court of Appeals of Indiana
- Full case name: Marlene Attaway, Appellants-Defendants, v. Llexcyiss Omega and D. Dale York, Appellees-Plaintiffs.
- Decided: March 13, 2009
- Citation: 903 N.E.2d 73

Court membership
- Judges sitting: Margret G. Robb, Terry A. Crone, Elaine B. Brown

Case opinions
- Majority: Crone, joined by Robb
- Concurrence: Brown

Keywords
- Personal jurisdiction

Attaway v. Omega, 903 N.E.2d 73 (Ind.App. 2009), was a decision by the Indiana Court of Appeals in which the Court found personal jurisdiction over an out-of-state defendant who bought a car on eBay then rescinded payment but returned the automobile at buyer's expense.

== Factual background and procedural history ==
In 2006 Llexcyiss Omega and Dale York, Indiana residents, sold a Porsche to Marlene Attaway (“Attaway”), Idaho resident, on eBay. Attaway submitted payment through PayPal and the amount was charged to Attaways’ MasterCard account. Attaway then hired an auto transporter to pick up the car from Indiana and deliver it to her Idaho residence. When the car was delivered, Attaway felt it was “significantly not as described” in the eBay listing and filed a claim asking for a refund. Her claim was denied. However, she was able to convince MasterCard to rescind the payment. Omega and York filed suit against Attaway demanding payment. Attaway filed an answer and motioned to dismiss for lack of personal jurisdiction before the Clay County, Indiana small claims court. That court denied the motion to dismiss. Car was returned to seller at Attaway's expense and was supposedly sold at auction. No proceeds were determined.

== Issue ==
Whether the Indiana court has personal jurisdiction over an Idaho defendant who rescinded payment on an online auction?

== Court's analysis ==
The Court breaks its analysis down into two components: United States Supreme Court personal jurisdiction precedent and specific cases, in other jurisdictions, regarding eBay sales and personal jurisdiction.

The Court summarizes the law of federal personal jurisdiction. International Shoe v. Washington the Supreme Court established that a nonresident defendant must have “certain minimum contacts with the forum state that does not offend tradition notions of fair play and substantial justice. Furthermore, there are two types of personal jurisdiction, general and specific. Contacts which are “continuous and systematic” may subject the defendant to general jurisdiction. Specific jurisdiction requires that the defendant has purposefully availed himself of the privilege of conducting activities within the forum state and that he should reasonably anticipate being hauled into court there.

If the defendant's contacts are sufficient to find either general or specific jurisdiction then the court must ask if personal jurisdiction would comport with “fair play and substantial justice.” The Supreme Court set forth five factors in Burger King Corp. v. Rudzewicz (1) burden on defendant; (2) forum state's interest in adjudicating the dispute; (3) plaintiff's interest in obtaining convenient and effective relief; (4) the interstate judicial system's interest in obtaining the most efficient resolution of controversies; and (5) shared interest of the several States in furthering fundamental substantive shared policies.

The court then proceeds to analyze the case law of other jurisdictions regarding the same legal issue. In Dedvukaj v. Maloney, a Michigan buyer sued a New York seller for breach of contract, fraud, and misrepresentation when the seller accepted buyer's payment but did not ship the items described in two eBay auction listings. The court considered many factors and found that the seller had purposely availed itself of acting in Michigan. The court also discusses another eBay case, Boschetto v. Hansing, in which a California buyer purchased a car from a Wisconsin seller via eBay. The buyer arranged for the car to be picked up and delivered to California. When the car arrived, the buyer found the vehicle to be in poor condition. The court dismissed the motion for lack of personal jurisdiction reasoning that the seller did not specifically direct his sale to California residents. The Ninth Circuit affirmed. The opinion also cites Machulsky v. Hall, a case where an Oregon buyer purchased a set of coins from a New Jersey seller on eBay. The buyer upon receipt of the coin set claimed it was not the set he had ordered and shipped it back to the seller. A lawsuit resulted and the court found that a single purchase, without more, is not sufficient to exercise personal jurisdiction.

== Decision ==
The Indiana Court of Appeals held, that although the present case does revolve around a single eBay purchase, there is personal jurisdiction and that it comports with traditional notions of fair play and substantial justice. The court reasons that because the Attaways agreed to pick up the vehicle in Indiana, hired an auto shipping company to go to Indiana as their representative, pick up the car, and deliver it to Idaho, that the transaction was really more than just a single online purchase. Thus, the Attaways purposefully availed themselves of the privilege of conducting activities in the forum state. The Court then considers the factors set forth in Burger King Corp v. Rudzewicz. The burden on the Attaways is no greater than the burden on Omega and York if they were forced to bring this case in Idaho. Furthermore, it is unclear whether travel expenses or inconvenience would be greater if the case is tried in Indiana. When weighing the interests of the states, “it is certainly within the bounds of fair play and substantial justice to allow Indiana to exercise personal jurisdiction over individuals who have entered into a contract with an Indiana resident for the purchase of property located in Indiana, have removed that property from the state of Indiana, and then rescinded payment.”
