= Maritz, Inc. v. Cybergold, Inc. =

Maritz v. Cybergold
- Court: United States District Court for the Eastern District of Missouri, Eastern Division
- Full case name: Maritz, Inc. v. Cybergold, Inc.
- Decided: August 19, 1996
- Citation: 947 F. Supp. 1328

Holding
- The motion of defendant to dismiss for lack of personal jurisdiction and improper venue is DENIED

Court membership
- Judge sitting: E. Richard Webber

Keywords
- Personal jurisdiction, The Lanham Act, Trademark infringement, Long-arm jurisdiction

Maritz, Inc. v. Cybergold, Inc., 947 F. Supp. 1328 (E.D. Mo. 1996), was a personal jurisdiction case in which the United States District Court for the Eastern District of Missouri ruled that operator of website, for which server was located in California, was subject to personal jurisdiction in Missouri under "commission of a tortious act" provision of Missouri's long-arm statute, §506.500 RSMo. The case was brought before the court by Marits, Inc. alleging that the Cybergold's use of mark for advertising internet site was a trademark infringement. Cybergold moved to dismiss the suit for lack of personal jurisdiction, but the court found that the operational nature of the Internet-based service provided a connection for Cybergold to be sued in Missouri.

== Background ==
=== Factual background ===
Cybergold Inc., the defendant, was a California-based corporation. The company created a website, www.cybergold.com, to promote its upcoming Internet service. The service consisted in maintain a mailing list of internet users who were willing to receive mailing in areas of their particular interest. Some of those users could be located in the state of Missouri. Cybergold provided to the users in its mail list an electronic mailbox and was planning forward advertisements for products and services that matched the users' interests to those electronic mailboxes. Cybergold business model considered to charge advertisers and to provide users with incentives to view the advertisements. At the time of the lawsuit, the service was not yet operational. The plaintiff asserted that Cybergold's website acted as a state-wide advertisement for CyberGold's forthcoming internet service and that through this website CyberGold was actively soliciting advertising customers from Missouri. Cybergold had no other contacts with the state of Missouri.

Maritz, Inc., the plaintiff, was a Missouri-based corporation. It offered an identical online service through its own website at www.goldmail.com. Maritz apparently announced its "GoldMail" online marketing services prior to Cybergold's operation of its competing website.

Since Cybergold has set up its website, the website was accessed through internet users located in Missouri at least 311 times – 180 of the 311 times were by Maritz and its employees.

=== Proceeding background ===
Maritz brought the action before its home forum of Missouri alleging that California-based Cybergold was engaged in trademark infringement and unfair competition in violation of Section 43(a) of the Lanham Act, 15 U.S.C. § 1125(a) by using the mark "CyberGold", which was confusingly similar to its mark "GoldMail" for identical online services. Cybergold filed a motion to dismiss for lack of personal jurisdiction and improper venue pursuant to the Federal Rule of Civil Procedure 12(b)(2).

== Issues ==
Whether the court of Missouri had personal jurisdiction on the basis that Cybergold's use of alleged mark on its online services, which can be reached by consumers in Missouri through Internet.

== Holding ==
The court denied Cybergold's motion to dismiss for lack of personal jurisdiction and improper venue, finding that the Missouri Court had personal jurisdiction over the case.

== Court's reasoning ==
Whether the Court can exercise personal jurisdiction over defendant requires a two-part inquiry. The Court first examines whether personal jurisdiction exists under Missouri's long-arm statute. Next, the Court must determine whether the exercise of personal jurisdiction is consistent with due process.

=== Missouri's long-arm statute ===
The Court ruled that the "commission of a tortious act" provision of Missouri's long-arm statute permitted jurisdiction over a defendant corporation where the sole basis for jurisdiction was an extraterritorial act of tortious interference with a contract which produced an effect in the State of Missouri. A violation of the Lanham Act is tortious in nature. The alleged activity had effect in Missouri as it caused economic injury to plaintiff. Thus, long-arm statute reaches defendant in this case.

=== Due process ===
The due process requirement can be justified if there is "minimum contacts" between the nonresident defendant and the forum state. The court applied five-part test:

1. the nature and quality of the contacts with the forum state – Although CyberGold characterized its activity as merely maintaining a "passive website," its intent was to reach all internet users, regardless of geographic location. CyberGold's website automatically and indiscriminately responded to each and every Internet user who accesses its website. CyberGold had consciously decided to transmit advertising information to all internet users, knowing that such information will be transmitted globally. CyberGold's contacts were of such a quality and nature, albeit a very new quality and nature for personal jurisdiction jurisprudence, that they favored the exercise of personal jurisdiction over defendant.
2. the quantity of those contacts – CyberGold had transmitted information regarding its services into Missouri approximately 131 times suggesting that it is purposefully availing itself of privilege of conducting activities in Missouri.
3. the relation of the cause of action to the contacts – the cause of action was the alleged plaintiff's injury that arose from the defendant use of its mark on its website.
4. the interest of the forum state in providing a forum for its residents – the State of Missouri had an interest in resolving this case and determining whether a Missouri corporation's trademark is being infringed in violation of a federal statute. The court reasoned that there was an interstate judicial system's interest in obtaining the most efficient resolution of controversies, and a shared interest of the several States in furthering fundamental substantive social policies.
5. the convenience of the parties – the defendant was not so burdened by defending itself in that forum under traditional notions of fair play and substantial justice.

== Effect on internet advertising ==
If the Maritz court's reasoning is adopted by other U.S. courts, nonresident defendants could be pulled into any court in the United States to defend trademark suits simply because they maintained a promotional website that could be and actually was accessed by a resident of the forum. Thus, even if the nonresident corporation refused to pursue business opportunities within the forum and had no contact other than Internet hits on its website, it could nevertheless be subject to jurisdiction there. Moreover, widespread forum shopping would likely occur, as plaintiffs conceivably could search for the forum whose laws are most amenable to their case so long as that forum had Internet users who accessed the defendant's website.

== See also ==
- Jurisdiction
- Personal Jurisdiction in Internet cases in the United States
- Civil Procedure
