= Hearst Corp. v. Goldberger =

- Court: United States District Court for the Southern District of New York
- Full case name: Hearst Corporation v. Goldberger
- Decided: February 26, 1997
- Docket nos.: 1:96-cv-03620
- Citations: 1:96-cv-03620; 1997 WL 97097; 1997 U.S. Dist. Lexis 2065

Court membership
- Judge sitting: Andrew J. Peck

Hearst Corp. v. Goldberger was a case out of the U.S. District Court for the Southern District of New York in which the court developed a reasoned framework to determine the proper exercise of personal jurisdiction in cases involving activity in cyberspace. The court determined that it lacked jurisdiction over an out-of-state defendant whose website was accessible to New York residents.

== Background ==
The rise of the Internet has posed difficulties for courts trying to determine the proper exercise of jurisdiction. In applying traditional doctrines, courts have arrived at inconsistent and sometimes contradictory results.

The established test for determining personal jurisdiction over an out-of-state defendant asks a court to evaluate whether the activity in question was purposefully directed toward the forum state such that the exercise of jurisdiction would not violate the defendant's due process rights. The second prong of the test requires that the defendant have "minimum contacts" with the forum state such that he/she could reasonably anticipate being called into court there.

Where the Internet is concerned, jurisdictional issues are more difficult. Most Internet users are unaware that they have transcended state borders and are subject to the jurisdiction of a different state. Thus, the exercise of personal jurisdiction over an Internet user may not comport with due process, since a user cannot purposefully avail himself of a particular jurisdiction if he has no indication of where is he in cyberspace.

== Facts ==
Goldberger (defendant), a New Jersey resident and attorney, had developed a website to provide legal support services to solo attorneys. At the time of the lawsuit, the website was not yet operational, consisting merely of a homepage describing the services he planned to offer. Hearst, the publisher of Esquire, filed an action alleging that Goldberger's domain name, Esqwire.com, infringed on its trademark. Hearst brought suit in New York, stating that the venue was proper because the website was accessible to New York residents. The New York long-arm statute allows a non-resident who does not transact business in New York to be sued if the non-resident has committed a tortious act within the state of New York, or if he commits such an act outside of the state with expected harm occurring within the state and he derives substantial revenue from interstate commerce.

== Holding and reasoning ==
The court held that the defendant's "out-of-state creation of an Internet web site that is accessible in New York, standing alone, does not provide personal jurisdiction over defendant in New York". New York's long-arm statute states that an out-of-state defendant must transact business within the state, and the cause of action must arise out of such a transaction, in order for jurisdiction to lie in New York. The court analogized to a previous case where advertisements directed toward consumers in New York were insufficient to satisfy the requirement of transacting business. It reasoned that Goldberger's website was not targeted at residents of New York or any other state in particular. His contacts were minimally intrusive, since he had not yet sold any products at the time the lawsuit was brought. On that basis, the court concluded that the website was "analogous to an advertisement in a national publication." Because placing an advertisement does not constitute transacting business under New York law, Goldenberg's activities did not constitute sufficient contacts with New York to justify the exercise of jurisdiction. The opinion also made the policy argument that allowing activity in cyberspace to establish sufficient minimum contacts would be too broad an extension of personal jurisdiction.

This holding rejected Maritz, Inset, Heroes, Inc., etc., which held that the existence of a web site available to forum residents, combined with tortious injury in the forum state, was sufficient to sustain jurisdiction.

== Subsequent treatment ==
Weber v. Jolly Hotels treated the Goldberger decision approvingly and also declined to grant general personal jurisdiction to the plaintiff in that case, as doing so would "violate the Due Process Clause of the Fourteenth Amendment to the United States Constitution."

== See also ==
- Personal jurisdiction
- Personal jurisdiction in Internet cases in the United States
