= Calder v. Jones =

- Supreme Court of the United States

Argued November 8, 1983 Decided March 20, 1984
- Full case name: Calder, et al. v. Shirley Jones
- Citations: 465 U.S. 783 (more) 104 S. Ct. 1482; 79 L. Ed. 2d 804; 1984 U.S. LEXIS 41; 52 U.S.L.W. 4349; 10 Media L. Rep. 1401

Case history
- Prior: Jones v. Calder, 138 Cal.App.3d 128, 187 Cal.Rptr. 825 (App. 2d Dist. 1982)

Holding
- A state's courts could assert personal jurisdiction over the author or editor of a libelous article, where the author or editor knew that the article would be widely circulated in the state where the subject of the article would be injured by the libelous assertion.

Court membership
- Chief Justice Warren E. Burger Associate Justices William J. Brennan Jr. · Byron White; Thurgood Marshall · Harry Blackmun; Lewis F. Powell Jr. · William Rehnquist; John P. Stevens · Sandra Day O'Connor

Case opinion
- Majority: Rehnquist, joined by unanimous

Laws applied
- U.S. Const. amend. XIV

Calder v. Jones, 465 U.S. 783 (1984), was a case in which the United States Supreme Court held that a court within a state could assert personal jurisdiction over the author and editor of a national magazine which published an allegedly libelous article about a resident of that state, and where the magazine had wide circulation in that state.

== Facts ==
The plaintiff, actress Shirley Jones, sued the defendants, the National Enquirer, its distributor, the writer of the article, and Calder, the editor-in-chief of the magazine, over an October 9, 1979 article in which the Enquirer alleged that Jones was an alcoholic. Jones lived in California, and although the Enquirer article had been written and edited in Florida, Jones filed her lawsuit in a California state court. Jones asserted that the court had jurisdiction based on the large circulation Enquirer enjoyed in California - selling over 600,000 copies each week out of a total national circulation of about 5,000,000 copies per week.

The publisher and the distributor did not object to jurisdiction in California. The trial court dismissed the claim as to the author and editor on the grounds that it lacked personal jurisdiction over the defendants, basing this finding on First Amendment concerns that permitting jurisdiction in such cases would chill free speech. The California Court of Appeal reversed, and the Supreme Court of California affirmed the appellate court's ruling. Calder appealed, as did the writer of the article, contending that the writer and editor of a magazine article were like welders of a boiler part. In such a case, although the manufacturer of the product could be held liable in another state where the product caused an injury, a worker who had neither a stake in the distribution nor any control over it would not be held liable in that state.

== Issue ==
The issue presented to the U.S. Supreme Court was whether the sale of a magazine article provided sufficient minimum contacts to permit the assertion of personal jurisdiction over the editor of that article, pursuant to the Due Process Clause of the Fourteenth Amendment.

== Holding ==
The Court, in a unanimous opinion written by Justice Rehnquist, held that California courts had jurisdiction over the defendant. Petitioners argued that, because they were merely employees of the libelous newspaper, their case was analogous to a welder who works on a boiler in Florida that subsequently explodes in California. The Court distinguishes this by noting that unlike the welder they intentionally targeted the California contact. Rehnquist wrote that the analogy to a welder "does not wash" and noted that the editor was aware that the magazine had a significant circulation in California, that the plaintiff resided in California, and that the allegations made in the article would harm her career there. The Court also rejected any First Amendment considerations, noting that the defendants could assert a First Amendment defense against the claim itself but not against the jurisdiction of the state court to hear the claim.

== Other developments ==
On the same day as this decision was reported, the Court held in Keeton v. Hustler Magazine, Inc. (1984) that jurisdiction would also be found even where the party injured by the libelous assertion was not a resident of the state where the lawsuit was brought. The court in Keeton found that the sale of "10,000 to 15,000 copies of its magazine - a very small percentage of its total publication," was sufficient to maintain that Hustler Magazine had sufficient minimum contacts with New Hampshire, such that the state could exercise jurisdiction over the magazine without conflicting with the constitutional requirements of due process.

== See also ==
- List of United States Supreme Court cases, volume 465
- Pennoyer v. Neff
- International Shoe Co. v. Washington
- Personal jurisdiction in Internet cases in the United States
