= Boschetto v. Hansing =

Diversity jurisdiction case

Boschetta v. Hansing
- Court: United States Court of Appeals for the Ninth Circuit
- Citation: 539 F.3d 1011

Case history
- Prior action: United States District Court for the Northern District of California granted the defendants' motion for dismissal for lack of personal jurisdiction.

Court membership
- Judges sitting: Betty Binns Fletcher, Pamela Ann Rymer

Case opinions
- Decision by: Betty Binns Fletcher
- Concurrence: Pamela Ann Rymer

Boschetto v. Hansing, 539 F.3d 1011 (9th Cir. 2008) is a diversity jurisdiction case brought by California resident, Paul Boschetto ("Boschetto") against certain private corporations with their principal place of business in Wisconsin. The case involved the determination of the question whether the sale of an item via the internet consumer-to-consumer trading portal, eBay, by the defendants in Wisconsin to the plaintiff in California, was sufficient to confer personal jurisdiction over a non-resident defendant in the buyer's forum state. At the first instance, the United States District Court for the Northern District of California decided against Boschetto and held that a lone “eBay sale consummated with a California purchaser, was insufficient to establish jurisdiction over any of the defendants.” Boschetto appealed against the decision to the United States Court of Appeals for the Ninth Circuit. The appellate court affirmed the decision of the district court and denied relief to Boschetto. The Court became the first federal appellate court to address whether personal jurisdiction in a forum state could be established when an out-of-state resident makes use of an intermediary website accessible by forum-state citizens.

== Background ==
=== Parties to the dispute and relevant facts ===
The plaintiff in the case, Paul Boschetto, was a resident of San Francisco, California. The defendants Frank-Boucher Chrysler Dodge-Jeep, Gordie Boucher Ford and Boucher Automotive Group ("Boucher defendants") were private corporations with their principal place of business in Wisconsin. Defendant, Hansing, was an employee of one of the Boucher defendants. The Boucher defendants were automobile dealers.

Boschetto alleged, that on August 1, 2005, defendant Hansing posted a listing for auction on eBay.com advertising a 1964 Ford Galaxie car as an "R Code" in "awesome condition," "recently rebuilt" and "ready to be driven." The Boucher defendants also operated a website that advertised their auto dealership. However, this website was not referred to or connected to the transaction at issue. In response to the listing, Boschetto bid $34,106 and on the same day received a notification from eBay informing him that his bid had succeeded. Boschetto paid for the car and was told that he could pick up the car from the Wisconsin dealership where Hansing worked. He hired a delivery company to transport the vehicle to California and received it on September 15, 2005. Upon delivery, Boschetto discovered that the car was not an "R Code" as advertised and had several other problems too. He tried contacting eBay and the defendants to rescind the purchase but his efforts failed. Consequently, he filed a complaint in the United States District Court, Northern District of California on February 23, 2006. In his complaint, he alleged four state law causes of action (violation of the California Consumer Protection Act; breach of contract; misrepresentation; and fraud). He pleaded diversity jurisdiction pursuant to the federal statute, 28 U.S.C. § 1332(a).

The Boucher defendants moved to dismiss the complaint for lack of personal jurisdiction. The district court granted the defendant’s motion and held that a single "eBay sale consummated with a California purchaser, was insufficient to establish jurisdiction over any of the defendants." Boschetto also requested the district court to permit additional discovery relevant to jurisdiction. But, the court exercised its discretion and denied the request stating that Boschetto's request was premised on "speculation without any support". Following these findings, Boschetto timely appealed to the United States Court of Appeals for the Ninth Circuit.

=== Issues before the Appellate Court ===
There were two issues before the Appellate Court:

1. Whether the sale of an item via the eBay Internet auction site provided sufficient "minimum contacts" to support personal jurisdiction over a non-resident defendant in the buyer’s forum state?
2. Whether the district court abused its discretion by denying Boschetto's request for jurisdictional discovery?

== Appellate Court's holding ==
The Court of Appeals decided both the issues in favor of the Boucher defendants. With regard to the first issue the court held that the "sale of one automobile via the eBay website, without more, does not establish jurisdiction over a non-resident defendant in the forum state". And with regard to the second issue the court decided that since Boschetto did not submit any evidence or allegation that the defendants were involved in more than just one sale, "the district court did not abuse its discretion by refusing to allow jurisdictional discovery."

== Court’s rationale ==
=== Personal jurisdiction over non-resident defendant ===
==== Purposeful availment standard ====
In reaching its conclusion about the lack of personal jurisdiction, the court applied a three-part test from Schwarzenegger v. Fred Martin Motor Co., 374 F.3d 797 (9th Cir. 2004), which stated that to determine whether the exercise of specific personal jurisdiction is appropriate, "the non-resident defendant must purposefully direct his activities or consummate some transaction with the forum or resident thereof; or perform some act by which he purposefully avails himself of the privilege of conducting activities in the forum, thereby invoking the benefits and protections of its laws". Further, "the claim must be one which arises out of or relates to the defendant's forum-related activities"; and "the exercise of jurisdiction must comport with fair play and substantial justice". The court further observed that the plaintiff had the burden of proving the first two prongs of the foregoing test and only then the defendant was required to come forward and show that the "exercise of jurisdiction would not be reasonable".

The court while clarifying the standard of "purposeful availment" as stated in first prong of the Scharzenegger test, stated that “to have purposefully availed itself of the privilege of doing business in the forum, a defendant must have performed some type of affirmative conduct which allows or promotes the transaction of business within the forum state.” The court also noted that "a contract alone does not establish minimum contacts in the plaintiff’s home forum". Applying the "purposeful availment" standard to the facts of the case, the court noted that the arrangement between Boschetto and Hansing was a contract for a sale of a good and was "insufficient to have created a substantial connection with California". Further, "the Boucher Defendants did not create any ongoing obligations with Boschetto in California; once the car was sold the parties were to go their separate ways". Based on this reasoning, the court held that the Boucher defendants did not purposefully avail themselves of the privilege of doing business in California and therefore were not subject to the jurisdiction of the courts in California.

==== Interactive websites ====
The court also discussed Cybersell, Inc. v. Cybersell, Inc. 130 F.3d 414 (9th Cir. 1997), wherein the court had looked at the level of interactivity of a website for the purposes of determining its jurisdictional effect. That court noted the lack of interactivity in Cybersell and concluded that the defendant had "done no act and consummated no transaction, nor has it performed any act by which it purposefully availed itself of the privilege of conducting activities, in Arizona, thereby invoking the benefits and protections of Arizona law". In Boschetto, the court observed that "where the Internet site actually belongs to and is operated by the defendant, the nature of the website has jurisdictional significance because the website allows the defendant to maintain some ongoing contact with the forum state". The Boucher defendants temporarily used the listing on eBay to "advertise a good for sale and that listing closed once the item was sold, thereby extinguishing the Internet contact for this transaction within the forum state".

However, the court distinguished the conduct of the Boucher defendants with cases where the defendants were using eBay platform as a "broader vehicle for commercial activity". The court held, quoting from International Shoe Co. v. Washington, 326 U.S. 310, that "where eBay is used as a means for establishing regular business with a remote forum such that a finding of personal jurisdiction comports with traditional notions of fair play and substantial justice.., then a defendant's use of eBay may be properly taken into account for purposes of establishing personal jurisdiction."

=== Exercise of the discretion by the District Court in denying jurisdictional discovery ===
The court discussed the standard of reviewing the exercise of discretion by the district court in permitting or denying jurisdictional discovery and observed that the district court’s decision “will not be reversed except upon the clearest showing that denial of discovery results in actual and substantial prejudice to the complaining litigant. The court further observed that the fact whether the Boucher defendants had used eBay to conduct significant quantities of sales of automobiles to California residents might have been jurisdictionally relevant, but Boschetto neither presented any evidence of such sales nor made any such allegation in his complaint. Therefore, "the denial of Boschetto's request for discovery, which was based on little more than a hunch that it might yield jurisdictionally relevant facts, was not an abuse of discretion."”

== Circuit Judge Pamela Ann Rymer’s concurrence ==
Judge Rhymer concurred with the opinion written by Judge B. Fletcher, but wrote separately to highlight her disagreement with Boschetto’s argument that the Boucher defendants, as sellers on ebay, necessarily availed themselves of the privilege of doing business in each state across the United States of America.

While elaborating on the concept of "purposeful availment", she observed quoting from Burger King Corp. v. Rudzewicz, 471 U.S. 462, that “the purposeful availment requirement ensures that a defendant will not be haled into a jurisdiction solely as a result of random, fortuitous, or attenuated contacts. Dealing with Boschetto's argument that the Boucher defendants could foresee that California residents would bid on their auction, and that they would benefit from their participation, she observed that "foreseeable participation by Californians [was] not enough. Hansing must have done something more to aim his auction expressly at the state, such as individually targeting California residents".

== Bibliography ==
- Boschetto v. Hansing, 539 F.3d 1011 (9th Cir. August 20, 2008).
