= North Ninth Street Historic District =

Historic district in Missouri, United States

- U.S. National Register of Historic Places
- U.S. Historic district
- Location within Missouri Location within the United States
- Location: 5-36 North Ninth St., Columbia, Missouri
- Coordinates: 38°57′7″N 92°19′39″W
- Area: less than one acre
- Architect: Boller Brothers
- Architectural style: Late Victorian, Late 19th And 20th Century Revivals
- MPS: Downtown Columbia, Missouri MPS
- NRHP reference No.: 03001473
- Added to NRHP: January 21, 2004

The North Ninth Street Historic District is a national historic district located at Downtown Columbia, Missouri, USA. It encompasses seven contributing buildings in an area that has historically been a center of commerce, recreation and culture. They were built between about 1885 and 1954, and are the L.J. Slate Billiard Hall (c. 1913), Allen Arnold Building (c. 1894), A. Victor Building (c. 1894), Lafayette Hume Building (c. 1885), Varsity Theatre (1927), Crosswhite Bakery (c. 1918), and Hume Building (c. 1904). The popular music venue The Blue Note is located within the district.

It was listed on the National Register of Historic Places in 2004.

== Gallery ==
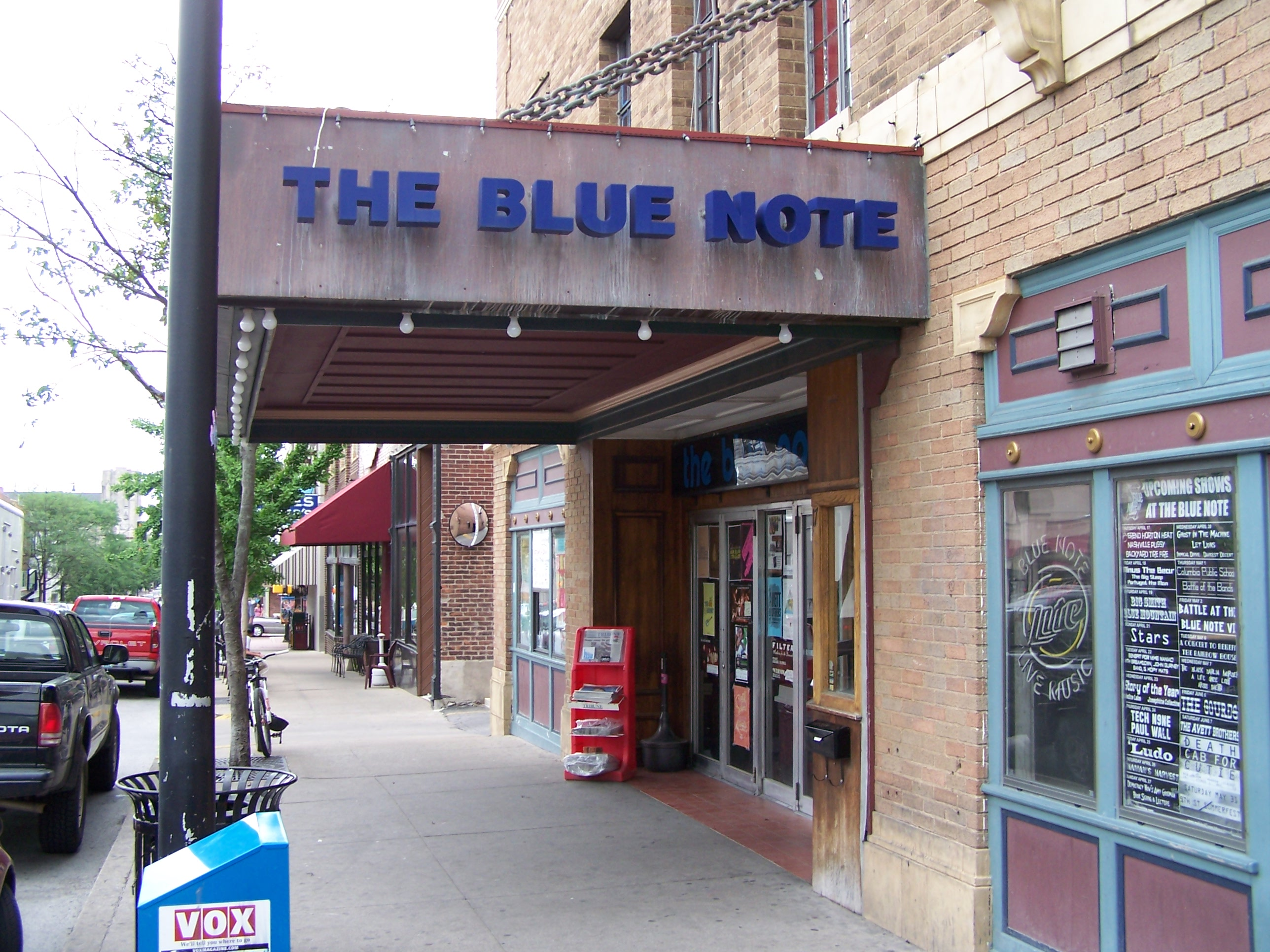
The blue note marquee

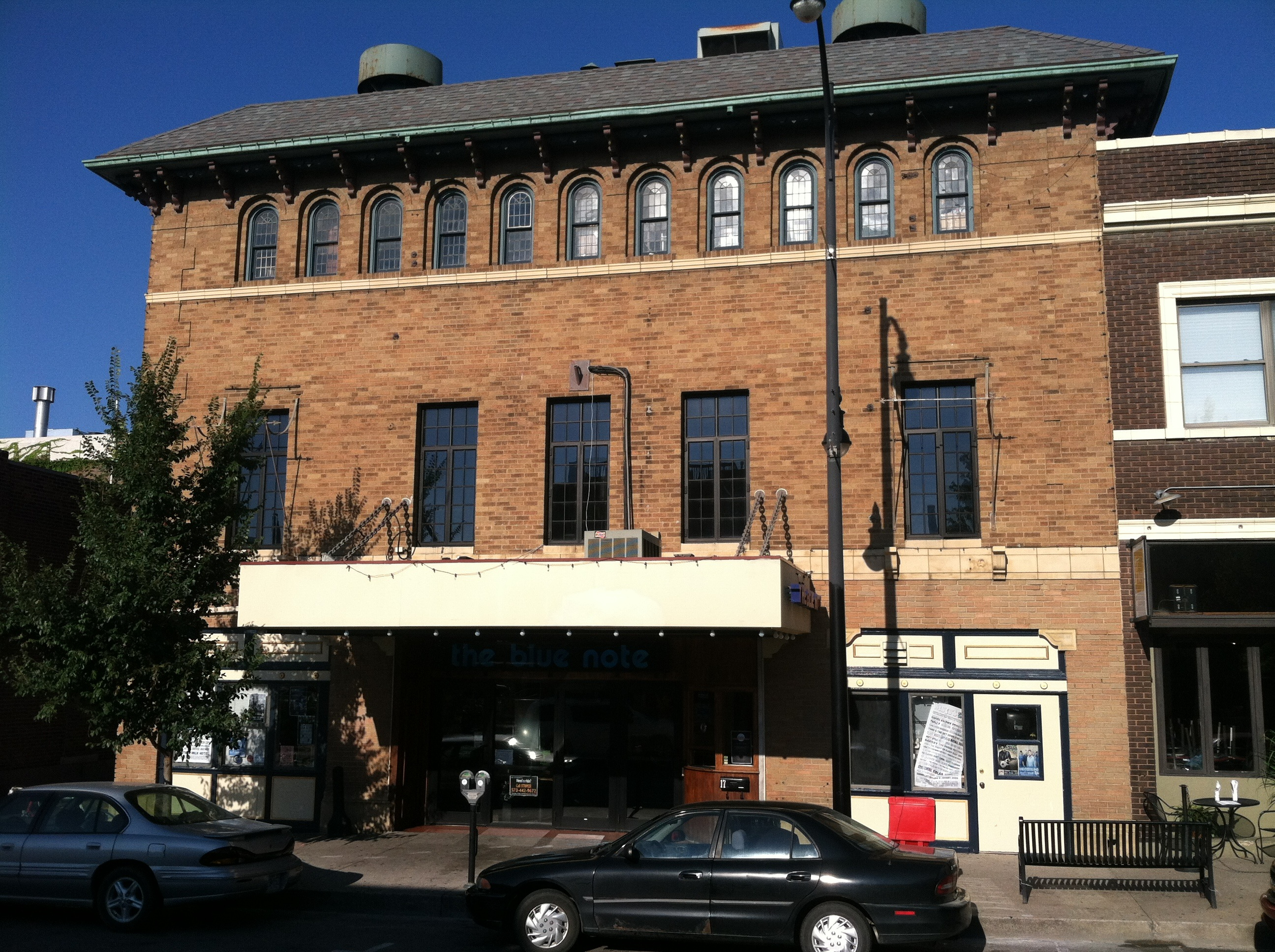
The Blue note from the front
