= Laurence Canter and Martha Siegel =

1994 originators of commercial spam; married American lawyers

Larry Canter
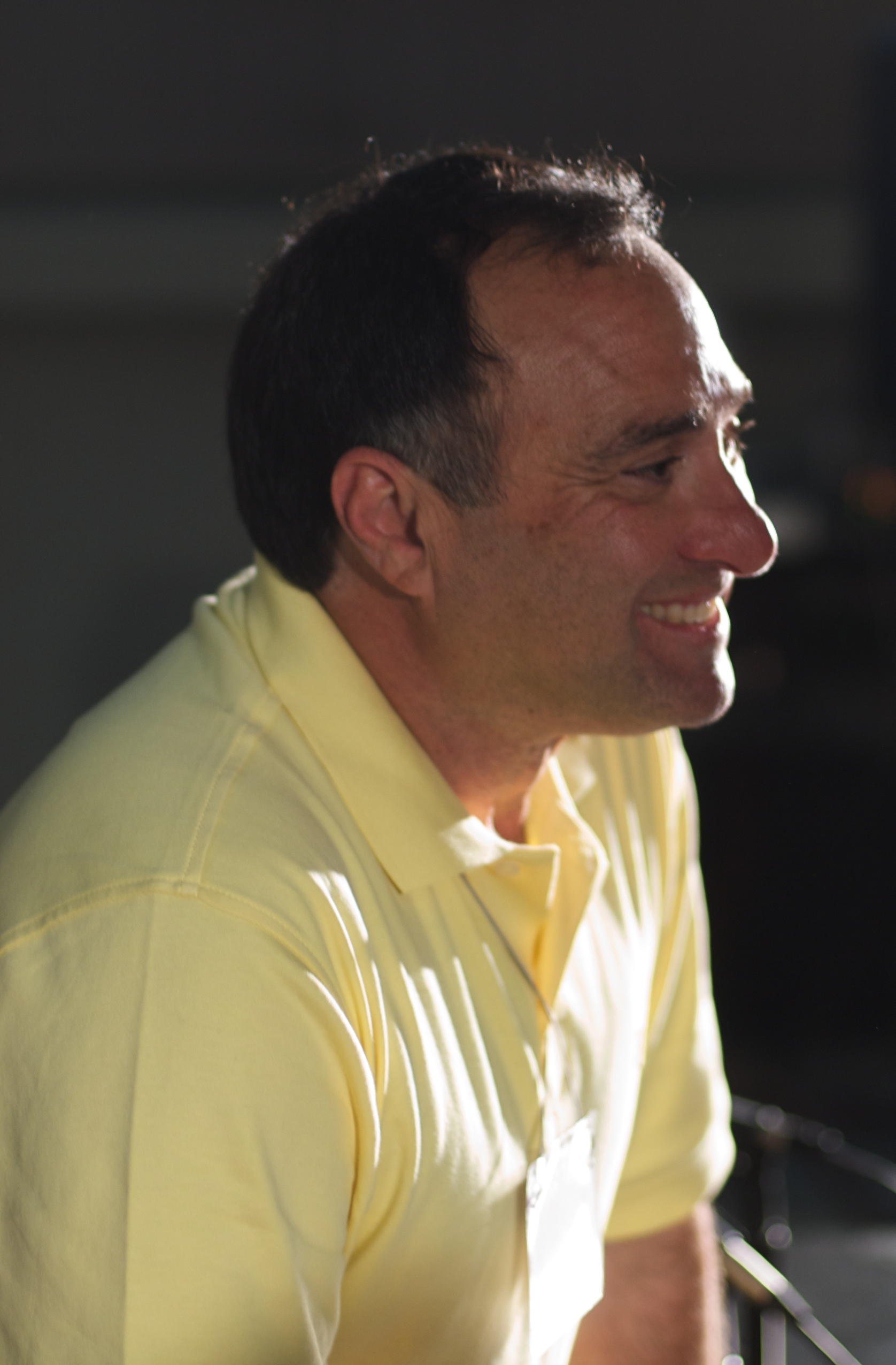
- Canter at ROFLCon in May 2010
- Born: Laurence A. Canter; June 24, 1953 (age 73)
- Occupations: Law (disbarred in 1997) and internet business
- Known for: First major commercial spamming campaign on Usenet
- Spouse: Martha Siegel (div. 1996)

Laurence A. Canter (born June 24, 1953) and Martha S. Siegel (April 9, 1948 - September 24, 2000) were partners and spouses in a firm of lawyers who committed the first massive commercial Usenet spamming on April 12, 1994. They were not the first Usenet spammers, but some consider them pioneers in the modern global field of ad spamming.

== Green card spam ==
In early 1994, Canter and Siegel contracted with Leigh Benson to write a program to advertise on Usenet, but Benson was unable to write their software. In April 1994 they used a Perl script written by a programmer known only as "Jason", to generate advertisements for their service of enrolling people in a "green card lottery". This US government program allocates a limited quantity of "green cards" to certain non-citizens, allowing them to stay and work in the country. The two lawyers offered to do the necessary paperwork for a fee.

Canter and Siegel sent their advertisement, with the subject "Green Card Lottery – Final One?", to at least 5,500 Usenet discussion groups, an enormous number at the time. Rather than cross-posting a single copy of the message to multiple groups, so a reader would only see it once (considered a common courtesy when posting the same message to more than one group), they posted it as separate postings in each newsgroup, so a reader would see it in each group they read. Their internet service provider, Internet Direct, received so many complaints that its mail servers crashed repeatedly for the next two days; it promptly terminated their service. Despite the ire directed at the two lawyers, they posted another advertisement to 1,000 newsgroups in June 1994. This time, Arnt Gulbrandsen put together a software "cancelbot" to trawl Usenet and kill their messages within minutes. Canter claimed in a December 1994 interview regarding the spam that "The best I can recall we probably made somewhere between $100,000 to $200,000 related to that".

On May 5, 1994, the couple established a company called Cybersell. They promoted themselves as experts in the then-new business of online retail and in February 1995 undertook the first known commercial spamming on behalf of clients (so-called "spam for hire"). They wrote a book titled How to Make a Fortune on the Information Superhighway: Everyone's Guerrilla Guide to Marketing on the Internet and Other On-line Services (ISBN 0-06-272065-1). In 1997, Martha Siegel published a revised version titled How to Make a Fortune on the Internet (ISBN 0-06-273466-0) under her name only.

In 1997, the Supreme Court of Tennessee disbarred Canter in part for illegal advertising practices. William W. Hunt III, of the Tennessee Board of Professional Responsibility, said at the time that he believed it was the first time a lawyer had been disciplined for Internet advertising practices.

== See also ==
- Cybersell, Inc. v. Cybersell, Inc.
