= The Blue Note (Columbia, Missouri) =

Music venue in Columbia, Missouri

Coordinates: 38.952200°N 92.327602°W

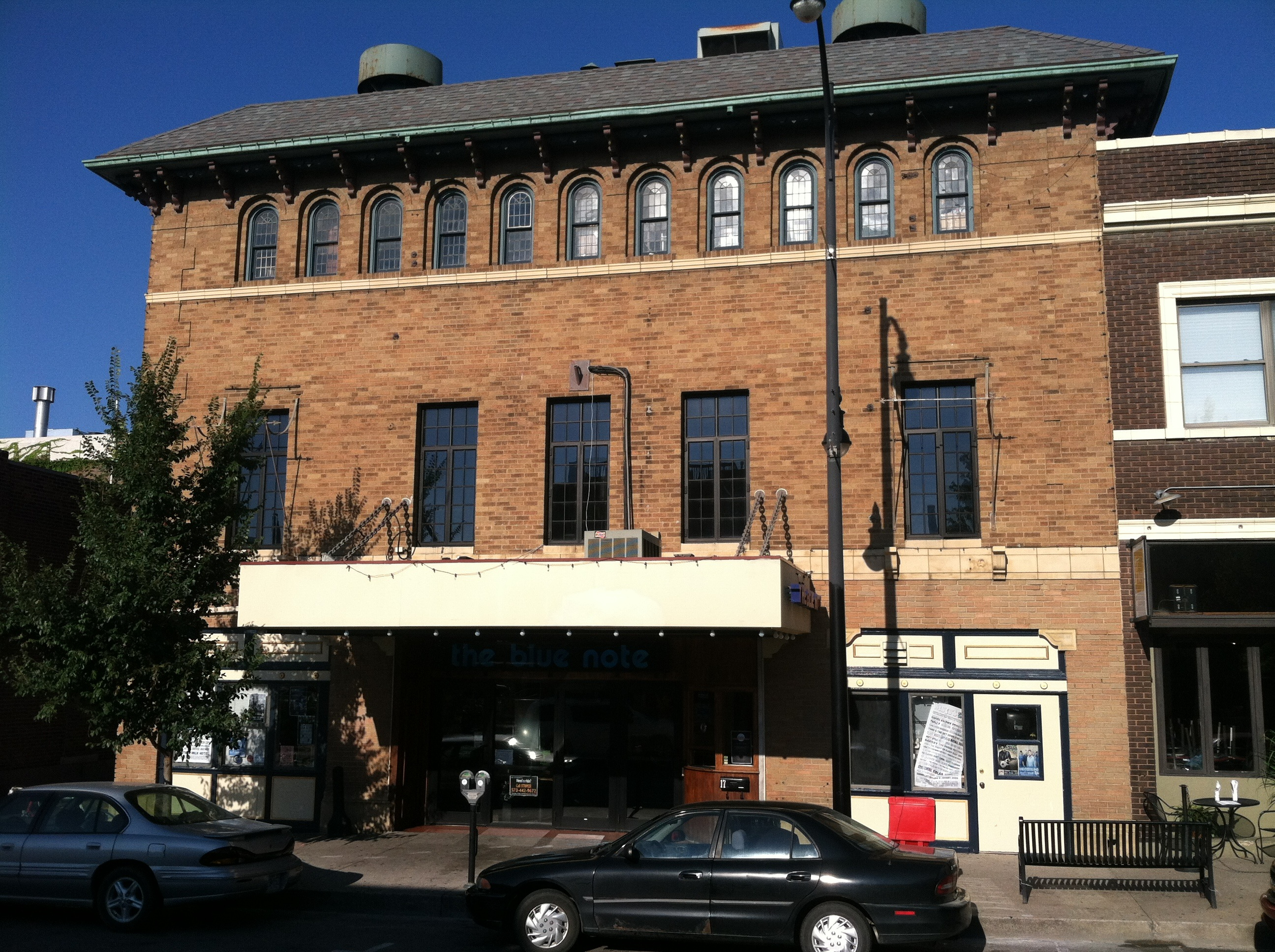
- The Blue Note facing Ninth Street
- Interactive map of The Blue Note
- Location: 17 North 9th Street; Columbia, Missouri 65201; United States
- Owner: Matt Gerding and Scott Leslie
- Capacity: 835
- Type: Music venue
- Public transit: Go COMO

Construction
- Opened: 1980
- Renovated: Dec 31, 2014

Website
- Official website

The Blue Note is a music venue in Columbia, Missouri, and is a contributing property to the North Ninth Street Historic District. It was established in 1980 by Richard King and Phil Costello. It is famous for the legal case Bensusan Restaurant Corp. v. King over naming use on the internet.

The original Blue Note was located at 912 Business Loop 70 East and moved to its Ninth Street location (a restored vaudeville theater) in the early 1990s. In October 2014, the venue was sold to Matt Gerding and Scott Leslie.

Despite being a smaller venue, it has hosted numerous national musical acts, including the Arctic Monkeys, Phish, Widespread Panic, R.E.M., Hüsker Dü (their last show), Uncle Tupelo, Meat Puppets, Chuck Berry, The Replacements, Minutemen, Dinosaur Jr., Primus, Black Flag, Red Hot Chili Peppers, Violent Femmes, Soul Asylum, Sonic Youth, Social Distortion, The Black Keys, Dave Matthews Band, Johnny Cash, Willie Nelson, Wilco, Ween, Weezer, They Might Be Giants, Slayer, System Of A Down, Limp Bizkit, Mr. Bungle, GWAR, Insane Clown Posse, Hole, Pixies, Megadeth, Sevendust, Reverend Horton Heat, St. Paul And The Broken Bones, and Yonder Mountain String Band, and holds a five-part concert series every summer called "Ninth Street Summerfest".

== Rose Music Hall ==
Formerly Mojo's, Rose Music Hall is located down the street in the North Village Arts District and often referred to as "The Blue Note's little sister". The venue was also founded by King and is now owned by Gerding and Leslie, and is usually reserved for smaller-name bands, but has also booked several up and coming artists prior to their breaking out.

Past performers have included; Arcade Fire, Spoon, Ben Kweller, Secret Machines, Cold War Kids, White Rabbits, Tapes 'n Tapes, Carolina Chocolate Drops, Big Smith, Local Natives, Portugal. The Man and Cave.

Mojo's

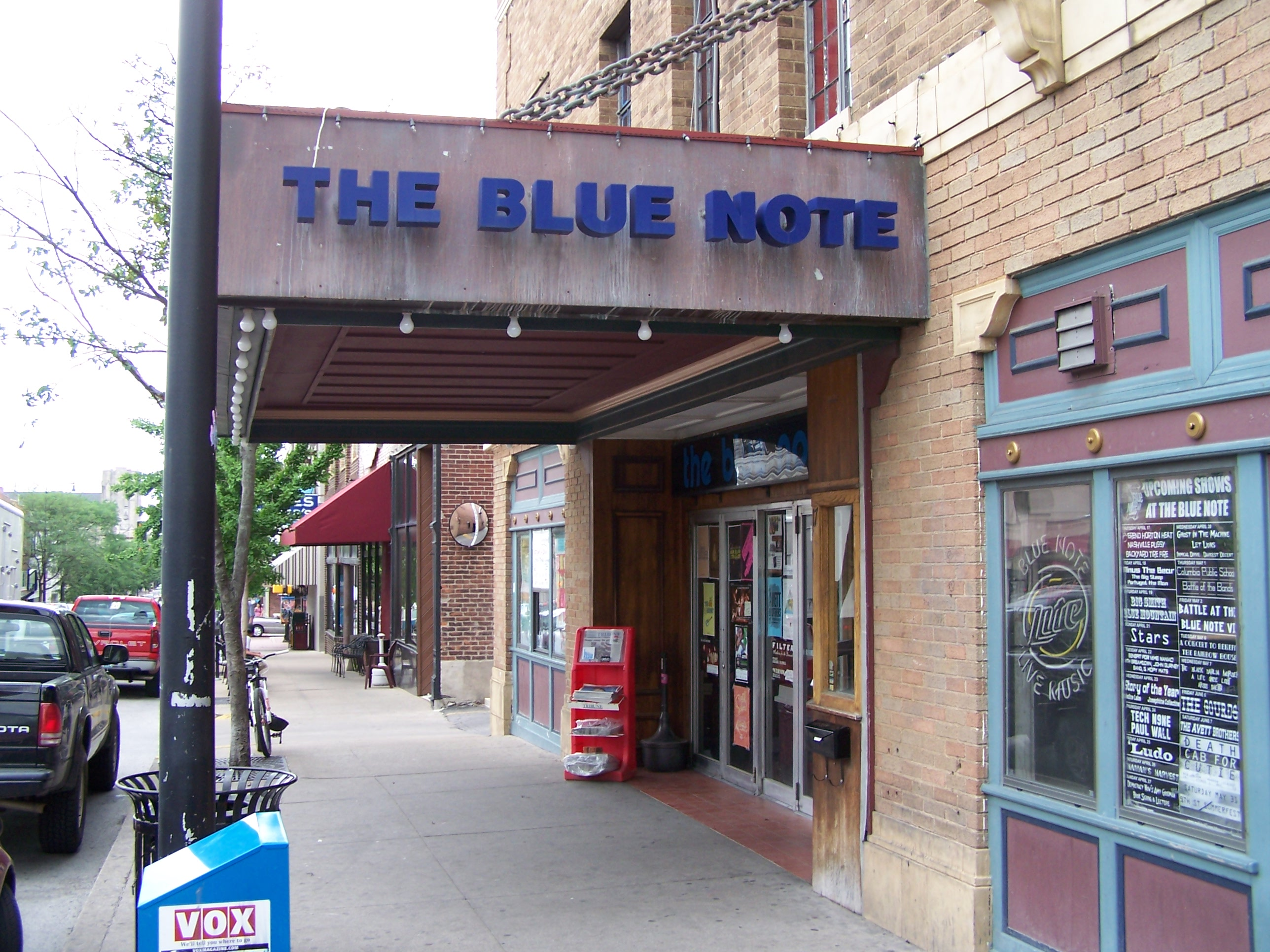
The Blue Note's marquee

Forrest Rose Park is located adjacent to Rose Music Hall and is maintained by Rose Music Hall's/Blue Note staff. The park began hosting outdoor performances in 2008.

== See also ==
- University of Missouri School of Music

== Sources ==
- O’Brien, Dianna Borsi (2021). Historic Movie Theaters of Columbia Missouri. Charleston, South Carolina: The History Press (Arcadia Publishing). pp. 62–75. ISBN 9781467146401.
