= Dudnikov v. Chalk & Vermilion Fine Arts, Inc. =

2007 United States appeals court case

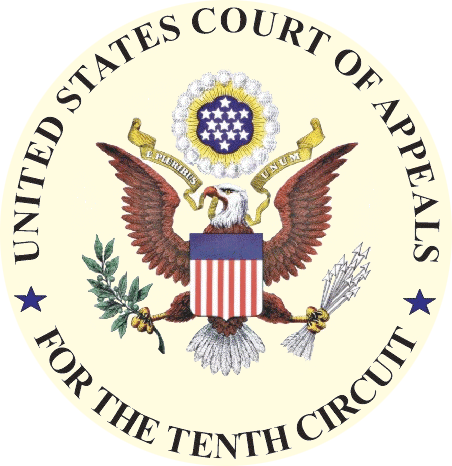
- Court: United States Court of Appeals for the Tenth Circuit
- Decided: January 28, 2008
- Citation: 514 F.3d 1063 (10th Cir. 2008)

Court membership
- Judges sitting: Michael W. McConnell, David M. Ebel, Neil M. Gorsuch

Case opinions
- Majority: Gorsuch

Laws applied
- Fourteenth Amendment

Dudnikov v. Chalk & Vermilion Fine Arts, Inc., 514 F.3d 1063 (10th Cir. 2008), was decided by the Tenth Circuit in January 2008. The Tenth Circuit overturned a dismissal granted by the District Court upon a motion to dismiss for lack of personal jurisdiction under FRCP12(b)(2). Dudnikov addresses issues arising from personal jurisdiction and the internet, applying standards set by the Supreme Court of the United States in a line of cases that progressively defined the doctrine and its scope in light of the Fourteenth Amendment.

== Issue ==
The issue presented to the Tenth Circuit was whether the court had specific jurisdiction over the defendants based on their interactions with the plaintiffs via eBay's internet services.

== Facts ==
The plaintiffs, Karen Dudnikov and Michael Meadors, were "power sellers" on eBay, dealing in a variety of fabrics and handmade crafts. One of the fabrics they listed for auction made a play on famous works by the artist Erté titled Symphony in Black and Ebony on White [sic]. The original artwork portrayed an elegant woman with a sleek dog on a leash. The fabric sold by Dudnikov portrayed Betty Boop with her dog, "Pudgy," in a similar pose.

Defendant Chalk & Vermilion Fine Arts, Inc. is the American Agent for the British corporation SevenArts, which owns the copyright for the Erté works of interest. Upon discovering the sale of the Betty Boop fabric, Chalk & Vermilion filed a request with eBay through their Verified Rights Owner Program ("VeRO") for a notice of claimed infringement. Under this program, eBay will terminate an item's auction upon receiving a notice from a VeRO member who certifies under penalty of perjury that it believes the item infringes its copyright.

After receiving eBay's Notice of Claimed Infringement (NOCI) notice canceling the auction, Dudnikov contacted Chalk & Vermilion and SevenArts to request that the NOCI be withdrawn, offering to refrain from relisting the disputed item. She was concerned that an NOCI filing would leave a black mark on her eBay reputation. SevenArts refused to withdraw the notice, prompting Dudnikov to challenge SevenArts' copyright claim with eBay. SevenArts responded by notifying Dudnikov that it intended to file a federal court action within ten days. Before SevenArts took the legal action they had threatened, the plaintiffs in this case filed for a declaratory judgment that the contested fabric depicting Betty Boop did not infringe SevenArts' copyright.

== Procedural ==
The plaintiffs brought a declaratory judgment action in the United States District Court of Colorado to resolve the issue of whether the plaintiff's sale of Betty Boop fabric infringed upon the defendant's copyright. A FRCP 12(b)(2) motion to dismiss for lack of personal jurisdiction was filed by the defendants and granted by the District Court. Plaintiffs filed for this appeal.

== Court's reasoning ==
The Tenth Circuit applied the Supreme Court's standard for determining personal jurisdiction. Distilling the holdings of several Supreme Court cases, the Tenth Circuit formulated and applied a five-part test to determine whether specific jurisdiction is proper. Proper exercise of due process requires that the defendants (1) have committed an intentional action, (2) that the action was expressly aimed at the forum state, (3) that defendants had knowledge that the brunt of the injury would be felt in the forum state, (4) that the plaintiff's injuries arose out of the defendant's forum related activities, (5) and that traditional notions of fair play and substantial justice are not offended.

=== Intentional Action ===
The Court held that the sending of the NOCI was an intentional act designed to terminate the plaintiff's auction. The defendants additionally threatened to bring suit within ten days if the NOCI was not enforced. Furthermore, the Court aligned itself with a Ninth Circuit ruling holding that the intentional act need not be wrongful, since such a requirement would be tantamount to assessing the merits of a case.

=== Action was Expressly Aimed at the Forum State ===
Though the defendants argued that the NOCI was sent to eBay in California, the court held that the defendants' intent in sending the NOCI was to request that eBay remove the auction for the infringing material. Also, the defendants contacted the plaintiffs directly, issuing a threat to sue them in federal court to prevent the future sale of the fabric. Furthermore, viewing the facts in the light most favorable to the plaintiff, as required by the standard of judgment for a 12(b) motion to dismiss, the court found that the defendants knew the plaintiffs were located in Colorado because notice was provided in their eBay listing.

=== Brunt of the Injury Felt in the Forum State ===
The Court found that defendants knew that plaintiffs' business was in Colorado, and thus that the effects of the NOCI would be felt there. Following Calder, the Court further determined that the defendants took intentional actions expressly aimed at the forum state, as evidenced by their cancellation of the plaintiff's auction.

=== Plaintiff's Injuries Arose out of Defendant's Forum-Related Activities ===
Whereas the Court was confronted with a selection of but-for causation and proximate causation when analyzing this issue, they held that both theories of causation were satisfied by the sending of the NOCI to eBay by the plaintiff, as well as the email exchange between the defendants and the plaintiffs. Since the NOCI declared that defendants believed in good faith that plaintiffs infringed their copyright, the merits of the declaratory judgment suit dealt directly with the same issue raised by the NOCI.

=== Traditional Notions of Fair Play and Substantial Justice are not Offended ===
The court evaluated the issue of fair play and substantial justice by considering factors of (1) the defendant's burden, (2) the forum state's interests in the dispute, (3) the plaintiff's interest in receiving convenient and effectual relief, (4) the judicial system's interest in efficiently resolving controversies, (5) the shared interest of the several states in furthering social policy. Based on these factors, the court decided that none of them weighed definitively in the defendants' favor. This is supported by the defendants' threat of litigation, which showed they were already willing to litigate the issue in federal court.

== Holding ==
The Court held that specific jurisdiction was proper over defendants Chalk & Vermilion and SevenArts because they committed an intentional act directly aimed at the forum state of Colorado, knew that plaintiffs would feel the impact of their actions within the forum state, and were not unduly prejudiced by the exercise of jurisdiction.

== Significance of case ==
Dudnikov outlines the Tenth Circuit's treatment of personal jurisdiction over the internet. The court applied traditional due process tests for personal jurisdiction. The court mentions briefly in its opinion that the question of jurisdiction in this case was not affected by any other statutes applicable to the complaint. Thus, Dudnikov is effective as precedent for deciding personal jurisdiction in the Tenth Circuit, as long as any other applicable laws confer the maximum jurisdiction possible consistent with due process.
