= Long-arm jurisdiction =

Legal concept

Long-arm jurisdiction is the ability of local courts to exercise jurisdiction over foreign ("foreign" meaning out of jurisdiction, whether a state, province, or nation) defendants, whether on a statutory basis or through a court's inherent jurisdiction (depending on the jurisdiction). This jurisdiction permits a court to hear a case against a defendant and enter a binding judgment against a defendant residing outside the jurisdiction concerned.

At heart, the constraints on long arm jurisdiction are concepts of international law, and the principle that one country ought not exercise state power over the territory of another unless some recognized exception applies. In municipal law, the authority of a court to exercise long-arm jurisdiction must be based upon some action of the defendant which subjects him or her to the jurisdiction of the court.

== China ==
=== Extraterritorial Patent Jurisdiction ===
China’s extraterritorial patent jurisdiction refers to the practice of Chinese courts extending their authority into international intellectual property disputes, most notably through the use of anti-suit injunctions. Beginning with high-profile cases in 2021 involving companies such as Xiaomi and Huawei, Chinese courts have issued rulings designed to block foreign patent holders from pursuing claims overseas. Legal experts view these measures as part of Beijing’s broader strategy to protect its technology firms and strengthen their global competitiveness. Critics argue that this approach undermines established norms of cross-border patent law, erodes reciprocal protections, and risks granting Chinese companies coercive leverage in international litigation.

=== Extraterritorial Application of the Hong Kong National Security Law ===
The Hong Kong National Security Law (NSL), enacted on 30 June 2020 by the Standing Committee of the National People’s Congress, criminalises secession, subversion, terrorism, and collusion with foreign forces. One of its most controversial features is its extraterritorial scope. Article 38 of the law states that it applies to offences committed outside Hong Kong by individuals who are not residents of the territory. This provision effectively grants the Hong Kong and Chinese authorities jurisdiction over anyone, anywhere in the world, whose actions are deemed to threaten China’s national security.

The law’s extraterritorial reach has drawn widespread criticism from foreign governments, who argue that it contravenes established principles of international law and undermines freedoms of expression and association worldwide. Several countries, including the United States, the United Kingdom, Canada, and Australia, suspended extradition treaties with Hong Kong in response. In practice, Hong Kong police have issued arrest warrants for exiled activists abroad and in some cases offered financial rewards for information leading to their capture.

Supporters of the measure in Beijing contend that the provision is necessary to counter foreign interference and safeguard China’s sovereignty. Critics maintain that it has produced a chilling effect, extending Chinese legal and political control far beyond Hong Kong and into overseas academic, journalistic, and activist circles.

=== Overseas police stations ===
In 2022, reports emerged that various Chinese provincial police agencies of the Ministry of Public Security had been administering police stations in foreign countries without the host country's knowledge. Upon discovery, many foreign governments accused the Chinese government of using the stations, situated primarily within Chinese diaspora communities across dozens of countries, to exert long-arm jurisdiction. Matt Schrader, writing for the Jamestown Foundation, noted that the centers served several legitimate purposes despite criticism of them, such as assisting crime victims with dealing with the host country's police and integrating new immigrants.

=== Religious affairs ===
The People's Republic of China asserts jurisdiction over the afterlife and reincarnation in global Buddhism via State Religious Affairs Bureau Order No. 5, also known as Measures on the Management of the Reincarnation of Living Buddhas in Tibetan Buddhism. The law was introduced in 2007 by the United Front Work Department under the banner of the then-"State Administration for Religious Affairs", and states that a Reincarnation Application must be filed by all Buddhists before consciously influencing their rebirths, which must only occur with the Chinese Communist Party's expressed consent. China's Ministry of Foreign Affairs has repeatedly stated that the Dalai Lama – who lives outside of China – must comply with the legislation.

On July 1, 2025, Reuters reported that Chinese Foreign Ministry spokeswoman Mao Ning told a press conference:

"The reincarnation of the Dalai Lama, the Panchen Lama and other great Buddhist figures must be chosen by drawing lots from a golden urn, and approved by the central government. The Chinese government implements a policy of freedom of religious belief, but there are regulations on religious affairs and methods for managing the reincarnation of Tibetan living Buddhas."

On the same day, Xinhua News Agency, a government mouthpiece, distributed a series of lengthy documents outlining China's position on the importance of state control of such matters, explaining:

"The formation of the Living Buddha reincarnation system is inextricably linked to the support of the central government. As such, a key aspect of the system is that the final authority for approving a reincarnated successor rests with the government. From the perspectives of national sovereignty and governmental authority, the central government exercises an approval and conferral system for the reincarnations of influential Living Buddhas. This reflects the state's sovereignty over regions such as Xizang [the Tibet Autonomous Region] and its authoritative role in the recognition of reincarnations. It embodies the principle that the state is above religion, with political authority taking precedence over religious authority, and that religious followers are citizens first and foremost."

== United States ==
=== Jurisprudence ===
The United States Supreme Court, in International Shoe v. Washington and later on in World-Wide Volkswagen Corp. v. Woodson, has held that a person must have minimum contacts with a State, in order for a court in one state to assert personal jurisdiction over a defendant from another state. As the Court noted in the latter case,

As has long been settled, and as we reaffirm today, a state court may exercise personal jurisdiction over a nonresident defendant only so long as there exist "minimum contacts" between the defendant and the forum State.... The concept of minimum contacts, in turn, can be seen to perform two related, but distinguishable, functions. It protects the defendant against the burdens of litigating in a distant or inconvenient forum. And it acts to ensure that the States, through their courts, do not reach out beyond the limits imposed on them by their status as coequal sovereigns in a federal system.

In 1987, the Supreme Court, in its ruling in Asahi Metal Industry Co. v. Superior Court, laid down a five-factor test to determine whether "traditional notions of fair play" would permit the assertion of personal jurisdiction, under the reasonableness requirement, over an out-of-state defendant:

1. What is the burden on the defendant?
2. What are the interests of the forum state in the litigation?
3. What is the interest of the plaintiff in litigating the matter in that state?
4. Does the allowance of jurisdiction serve interstate efficiency?
5. Does the allowance of jurisdiction serve interstate policy interests?

There was discussion as to the Court's wisdom in not employing Asahi as a way to articulate "a similarly limited position [as in World-Wide Volkswagen] for the United States within the international community."

The issue of general (as opposed to specific) jurisdiction of US courts was addressed in Helicopteros Nacionales de Colombia, S. A. v. Hall, Goodyear Dunlop Tires Operations, S. A. v. Brown and Daimler AG v. Bauman, where the last held that, outside of "an exceptional case," general jurisdiction will generally be limited to the places where a corporation is incorporated and its principal place of business. In Daimler, Justice Ginsburg noted that specific jurisdiction is supposed to be the norm while "general jurisdiction has come to occupy a less dominant place in the contemporary scene." The risks that a more expansive view of general jurisdiction would pose to international comity were recently dealt with in Kiobel v. Royal Dutch Petroleum Co. and Mohamad v. Palestinian Authority.

=== Foreign governments ===
The circumstances by which a foreign government may sue or be sued in federal and state courts are narrowed by the Foreign Sovereign Immunities Act and the Eleventh Amendment to the United States Constitution.

=== State laws ===
In the United States, some states' long-arm statutes refer to specific acts, for example torts or contract cases, which a court may entertain. Other states grant jurisdiction more broadly. California's Code of Civil Procedure, for example, states:

410.10. A court of this state may exercise jurisdiction on any basis not inconsistent with the Constitution of this state or of the United States.

New York's Civil Practice Law and Rules has, among other things, asserted the following:

§ 302. Personal jurisdiction by acts of non-domiciliaries

(a) ...As to a cause of action arising from any of the acts enumerated in this section, a court may exercise personal jurisdiction over any non-domiciliary, or his executor or administrator, who in person or through an agent:

1. transacts any business within the state or contracts anywhere to supply goods or services in the state...

The extent of jurisdiction granted under this authority has expanded in recent jurisprudence of the New York Court of Appeals:

- In June 2006, in Deutsche Bank Securities, Inc. v. Montana Board of Investments, it was held that an out-of-state entity's use of the Bloomberg Messaging System to communicate with a firm based in New York was sufficient to establish jurisdiction.
- In November 2012, in Licci v. Lebanese Canadian Bank, SAL , it was held that a non-U.S. bank’s use of a correspondent account to effect wire transfers on behalf of a non-U.S. client was sufficient to form a basis for personal jurisdiction.

=== Federal Rules of Civil Procedure ===
Rule 4(k) of the Federal Rules of Civil Procedure provides for where service of a summons outside the district will provide personal jurisdiction over a party.

(k) Territorial Limits of Effective Service.

(1) In General. Serving a summons or filing a waiver of service establishes personal jurisdiction over a defendant:

(A) who is subject to the jurisdiction of a court of general jurisdiction in the state where the district court is located;

(B) who is a party joined under Rule 14 or 19 and is served within a judicial district of the United States and not more than 100 miles from where the summons was issued; or

(C) when authorized by a federal statute.

(2) Federal Claim Outside State-Court Jurisdiction. For a claim that arises under federal law, serving a summons or filing a waiver of service establishes personal jurisdiction over a defendant if:

(A) the defendant is not subject to jurisdiction in any state's courts of general jurisdiction; and

(B) exercising jurisdiction is consistent with the United States Constitution and laws.

== Canada ==
The jurisdiction of Canadian courts has been standardized to a great degree through jurisprudence developed by the Supreme Court of Canada, most notably in the 2012 ruling in Club Resorts Ltd. v. Van Breda. It ruled that jurisdiction must be established primarily on the basis of objective factors that connect the legal situation or the subject matter of the litigation with the forum. In a case concerning a tort, the following factors are presumptive connecting factors that, prima facie, entitle a court to assume jurisdiction over a dispute:

- the defendant is domiciled or resident in the province;
- the defendant carries on business in the province;
- the tort was committed in the province; and
- a contract connected with the dispute was made in the province.

It was also held that a Canadian court cannot decline to exercise its jurisdiction unless the defendant invokes forum non conveniens. The decision to raise this doctrine rests with the parties, not with the court seized of the claim. If a defendant raises an issue of forum non conveniens, the burden is on him or her to show why the court should decline to exercise its jurisdiction and displace the forum chosen by the plaintiff.

== See also ==
- Extraterritoriality
- Penguin Group (USA) Inc. v. American Buddha
- Chinese police overseas service stations
- Universal jurisdiction
