= Bensusan Restaurant Corp. v. King =

American legal case

- Court: United States Court of Appeals for the Second Circuit
- Full case name: Bensusan Restaurant Corporation v. Richard B. King, individually and doing business as The Blue Note
- Argued: April 9, 1997
- Decided: Sept. 10, 1997
- Citation: 126 F.3d 25

Case history
- Prior history: Bensusan Restaurant Corp. v. King, 937 F. Supp. 295 (S.D.N.Y. 1996)

Holding
- In favor of defendant Richard B. King

Court membership
- Judges sitting: Ellsworth Van Graafeiland, John M. Walker, Jr., Pierre N. Leval

Bensusan Restaurant Corp. v. King, 126 F.3d 25, is a 1997 United States Court of Appeals for the Second Circuit case that helped define the parameters of personal jurisdiction in the Internet context, specifically for passive websites that only advertise local services. The opinion, written by Judge Ellsworth Van Graafeiland, affirmed the United States District Court for the Southern District of New York's holding that defendant Richard B. King's Internet website did not satisfy New York's long-arm statute requirements for plaintiff Bensusan Restaurant Corporation to bring a trademark infringement suit in New York. The District Court's decision also likened creating a website to merely placing a product into the stream of commerce, and held that such an act was insufficient to satisfy due process and personal jurisdiction requirements.

== Background ==
Bensusan Restaurant Corporation ("Bensusan") was a New York corporation that owned The Blue Note, a jazz club in Greenwich Village, New York. Bensusan owned all trademark rights, title and interest in the federally registered "The Blue Note" mark. Richard B. King ("King") was a Missouri resident who owned The Blue Note club in Columbia, Missouri. In April 1996, King posted a website hosted on a computer server in Missouri that contained "general information about the club in Missouri as well as a calendar of events and ticketing information". In addition, King's website contained a disclaimer that stated "The Blue Note, Columbia, Missouri should not be confused in any way, shape, or form with Blue Note Records or the jazz club, Blue Note, located in New York. The CyberSpot is created to provide information for Columbia, Missouri area individuals only, any other assumptions are purely coincidental".

== Procedure ==
Bensusan brought suit in the Southern District of New York, asserting claims of trademark infringement, trademark dilution and unfair competition. King moved to dismiss the action for lack of personal jurisdiction pursuant to Federal Rules of Civil Procedure 12(b)(6). Bensusan asserted that New York had personal jurisdiction over King based on two subsections of the New York Civil Practice Law and Rules - § 302(a)(2) and § 302(a)(3)(ii). Bensusan's primary argument was that because King's website was accessible in New York, King could have foreseen that it would be viewed in New York, and should have restricted access to only users in Missouri.

Personal jurisdiction by acts of non-domiciliaries. (a) Acts which are the basis of jurisdiction. As to a cause of action arising from any of the acts enumerated in this section, a court may exercise personal jurisdiction over any non-domiciliary, or his executor or administrator, who in person or through an agent: . . . 2. commits a tortious act within the state, except as to a cause of action for defamation of character arising from the act; or 3. commits a tortious act without the state causing injury to person or property within the state, except as to a cause of action for defamation of character arising from the act, if he . . . (ii) expects or should reasonably expect the act to have consequences in the state and derives substantial revenue from interstate or international commerce.

— N.Y. C.P.L.R. § 302

The District Court looked both to the meanings of N.Y.C.P.L.R. § 302 and the Due Process Clause of the United States Constitution in analyzing Bensusan's claim. The Court of Appeals only addressed the long-arm statutes in affirming the District Court's holding.

== Issues ==
1. Whether New York has personal jurisdiction over King pursuant to New York long-arm statute
2. Whether exercising personal jurisdiction over King would be a violation of the Due Process Clause of the US Constitution

== Holding ==
The New York long-arm statutes do not permit personal jurisdiction over King.
The District Court held that King's website did not constitute an offer to sell a product in New York pursuant to § 302(a)(2), and that King neither participated in interstate commerce nor expected for his website to have consequences in New York according to § 302(a)(3)(ii). The Court noted that "it takes several affirmative steps by the New York resident . . . to obtain access to the Web site and utilize the information there" because the website provided a Missouri box office phone number to reserve tickets, and required patrons to pick up the tickets in Missouri. Furthermore, because there was no proof that goods were shipped to New York, § 302(a)(2) did not authorize personal jurisdiction over King. With respect to § 302(a)(3)(ii), the Court found that King did not derive substantial revenue from interstate commerce, and King's knowledge that Bensusan's club was located in New York was insufficient to satisfy the statutory requirements to authorize personal jurisdiction. The Court of Appeals affirmed the District Court's findings, adding only that § 302(a)(2) required defendants to have committed a tort while present in New York state. Because King's website was created in Missouri, New York did not have personal jurisdiction over him.

It would violate the Due Process Clause of the US Constitution if New York had personal jurisdiction over King.
The District Court concluded that even if N.Y.C.P.L.R. §§ 302(a)(2), (a)(3)(ii) authorized personal jurisdiction over King, such an act would violate the Due Process Clause of the US Constitution. Due process requires a non-resident defendant to purposefully establish minimum contact with the state claiming jurisdiction, such that the suit does not offend "traditional notions of fair play and substantial justice." The Court found that King did not purposefully avail himself of any benefits that New York offered, and that the mere creation of an informational website was not an act that was purposefully directed at any one particular state. Specifically, the Court contrasted King's website and actions with those of the defendant in CompuServe, Inc. v. Patterson, where Ohio was authorized to exercise personal jurisdiction because the defendant targeted Ohio in subscribing to a network service and sending software to Ohio. The Court of Appeals explicitly declined to address the due process issue, because the long-arm statute did not confer personal jurisdiction.
