= Zippo Manufacturing Co. v. Zippo Dot Com, Inc. =

U.S. District Court ruling establishing the Zippo "Sliding Scale" test

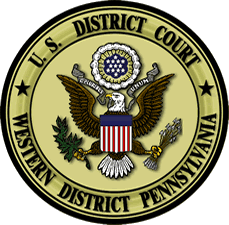
- Court: United States District Court for the Western District of Pennsylvania
- Decided: January 16, 1997
- Citation: 952 F. Supp. 1119

Holding
- The Court denied Zippo Dot Com's motion to dismiss for lack of jurisdiction finding that its contacts with Pennsylvania residents and ISPs constituted purposeful availment of the privilege of conducting activities within the forum State.

Court membership
- Judge sitting: Sean J. McLaughlin

Keywords
- Personal Jurisdiction

Zippo Manufacturing Co. v. Zippo Dot Com, Inc., 952 F. Supp. 1119 (W.D. Pa. 1997), was a decision by the United States District Court for the Western District of Pennsylvania holding that a court has personal jurisdiction over a website originating in a different territory, if the website is accessible to Internet users in the court's territory.

Zippo is a landmark opinion regarding personal jurisdiction for courts deciding Internet-oriented disputes, and it is one of the most frequently cited Internet law precedents. The case established a standard of jurisdictional analysis now known as the "Zippo test," or the "Zippo sliding scale test."

== Background ==
Zippo Manufacturing Company, a Pennsylvania corporation, makes the well-known Zippo pocket lighters. Zippo.com was an unaffiliated California corporation that operated an Internet website offering access to USENET newsgroups. The Zippo.com company registered the domain names "zippo.com", "zippo.net", and "zipponews.com" without regard for the prior use of that name by the lighter company.

Zippo Manufacturing filed a complaint in its own Pennsylvania district court against Zippo.com, alleging trademark dilution, trademark infringement, and false designation under the Lanham Act and state trademark dilution statutes. Zippo.com countered that the Pennsylvania court did not have personal jurisdiction over them because the company had no minimum contacts in Pennsylvania, and moved for the case to be dismissed.

Zippo.com's contacts with any user in Pennsylvania occurred exclusively over the Internet, and its online content was as visible for all Internet users as it was for those in Pennsylvania. That company did not maintain any offices, employees, or agents in Pennsylvania. However, Zippo.com had approximately 140,000 paying subscribers worldwide, and about two percent (3,000) of those were Pennsylvania residents. Zippo.com had entered into agreements with seven Internet access providers in Pennsylvania to permit their subscribers to access its USENET database, including two providers within the Western District of Pennsylvania.

== "Sliding scale" test for Internet jurisdiction ==
The court established a three-prong test for determining whether a court has jurisdiction over a website, with a sliding scale of minimum contacts in a territory outside that of the site's origin. Under the sliding scale, "the likelihood that personal jurisdiction can be constitutionally exercised is directly proportionate to the nature and quality of the commercial activity that an entity conducts over the Internet."

At the "strong" end of the scale is a defendant that clearly does business over the Internet, via a website that is visible for users in other territories, with contracts or other agreements in which "foreign" users consent to receiving the content and conducting business. At the "weak" end of the scale is a passive website that merely posts text with no opportunity for interactivity or business transactions. That type of website does not establish personal jurisdiction in other territories, but any website that does more and approaches the other end of the sliding scale has established enough contacts in the "foreign" territory to establish personal jurisdiction for that territory's courts. Thus, personal jurisdiction is more likely with increasing interactivity at the website in question.

== Opinion ==
The Court stated that Zippo.com had established business contacts with enough subscribers in Pennsylvania to allow personal jurisdiction, so Pennsylvania courts could hold hearings and issue opinions in disputes concerning that website. Thus, the District Court denied Zippo.com's motion to dismiss the suit, enabling a full trial for the manufacturing company's trademark claim. Zippo.com settled the case in December 1998, on confidential terms, before the trademark dispute could go to trial. The "zippo.com" domain name and related domain names were transferred to the ownership of the manufacturing company.

== Impact ==
The "sliding scale" test used in the Zippo ruling has played an important role in Internet jurisdiction. At least five federal appellate courts have expressly adopted the Zippo test. However, some other courts have rejected that test, criticizing the matter of casual Internet usage by a territory residents as a factor in determining jurisdiction.

The Zippo case has been cited as a crucial early precedent in Internet law, establishing that a court has personal jurisdiction over a website and its owners if any person within the court's geographic territory has access to that site. Given the fact that most websites are equally accessible to all users of the World Wide Web, the Zippo case has had a wide impact on the ability of American companies or users to initiate suits against website creators.

== See also ==
- Personal jurisdiction in Internet cases in the United States
