= Helicopteros Nacionales de Colombia, S. A. v. Hall =

- Supreme Court of the United States

Argued November 8, 1983 Decided April 24, 1984
- Full case name: Helicopteros Nacionales de Colombia, S. A. v. Hall, et al.
- Citations: 466 U.S. 408 (more) 104 S. Ct. 1868; 80 L. Ed. 2d 404; 1984 U.S. LEXIS 68; 52 U.S.L.W. 4491

Case history
- Prior: 616 S.W.2d 247 (Tex. Civ. App. 1981); reversed, 638 S.W.2d 870 (Tex. 1982); cert. granted, 460 U.S. 1021 (1983).

Holding
- Purchases in the United States by an out of state corporation did not establish the "minimum contacts" necessary for personal jurisdiction.

Court membership
- Chief Justice Warren E. Burger Associate Justices William J. Brennan Jr. · Byron White; Thurgood Marshall · Harry Blackmun; Lewis F. Powell Jr. · William Rehnquist; John P. Stevens · Sandra Day O'Connor

Case opinions
- Majority: Blackmun, joined by Burger, White, Marshall, Powell, Rehnquist, Stevens, O'Connor
- Dissent: Brennan

Laws applied
- U.S. Const. amend. XIV

Helicopteros Nacionales de Colombia, S. A. v. Hall, 466 U.S. 408 (1984), was an American case decided by the United States Supreme Court, holding that purchases in the United States by an out-of-state corporation did not establish general personal jurisdiction.

Helicopteros Nacionales de Colombia, a Colombian corporation, purchased a majority of its helicopters and training for said helicopters in Texas. They provide helicopter transport for oil and construction companies in South America. The incident in question happened on Jan 26, 1976 when a helicopter crashed killing four Americans. In the contract, which was negotiated in Houston, that the plaintiffs had with the defendants there was a choice of location clause which stated that all controversies would be submitted to Peruvian courts.

The Court concluded that Texas did not have jurisdiction over Helicopteros. While they did engage in business-related activates, these activities did not rise to the level of "continuous and systematic" contacts for the courts to have general jurisdiction.
