= International Shoe Co. v. Washington =

- Supreme Court of the United States

Argued November 14, 1945 Decided December 3, 1945
- Full case name: International Shoe Company v. State of Washington, Office of Unemployment Compensation & Placement, et al.
- Citations: 326 U.S. 310 (more) 66 S. Ct. 154; 90 L. Ed. 95; 1945 U.S. LEXIS 1447; 161 A.L.R. 1057

Case history
- Prior: Special appearance by appellant in Washington state court as defendant in lower court; appellant moved to set aside order on grounds of lack of personal jurisdiction; tribunal denied motion; state Superior Court affirmed; state Supreme Court affirmed

Holding
- Suit cannot be brought against an individual unless they have minimum contacts with the forum state, and such lawsuit does not offend traditional notions of fair play and substantial justice.

Court membership
- Chief Justice Harlan F. Stone Associate Justices Hugo Black · Stanley F. Reed; Felix Frankfurter · William O. Douglas; Frank Murphy · Robert H. Jackson; Wiley B. Rutledge · Harold H. Burton

Case opinions
- Majority: Stone, joined by Reed, Frankfurter, Douglas, Murphy, Rutledge, Burton
- Concurrence: Black
- Jackson took no part in the consideration or decision of the case.

Laws applied
- U.S. Const. Amendment XIV; 26 U.S.C. § 1606; Washington Unemployment Compensation Act

International Shoe Co. v. Washington, 326 U.S. 310 (1945), is a landmark decision of the Supreme Court of the United States in which the Court held that a party, particularly a corporation, may be subject to the jurisdiction of a state court if it has "minimum contacts" with that state. The ruling has important consequences for corporations involved in interstate commerce, their payments to state unemployment compensation funds, limits on the power of states imposed by the Due Process Clause of the Fourteenth Amendment, the sufficiency of service of process, and, especially, personal jurisdiction.

== Background ==
=== Corporations and personal jurisdiction before International Shoe ===
In earlier cases, such as Bank of Augusta v. Earle (1839), the United States Supreme Court said that corporations do not have legal existence outside of their states of incorporation. After Pennoyer v. Neff (1878) established that states cannot have personal jurisdiction over defendants who are physically absent from the state and have not consented to the court's jurisdiction, corporations generally were not normally able to be personally served outside of that incorporation state, as demonstrated in St. Clair v. Cox (1882). However, state courts wanted to exercise jurisdiction over foreign corporations, and they developed legal theories justifying the practice notwithstanding the case law. The theories for how to do this that preceded International Shoe were typically about "consent," "presence," or "submission." When these theories reached the Supreme Court in cases like Philadelphia and Reading Railroad Company v. McKibbin (1917) or Goldey v. Morning News (1894), the Supreme Court said that it would decide whether the exercise of personal jurisdiction was fair based on the facts of the case and that the general rule would be that a corporation would not be subject to that jurisdiction unless there were enough evidence to justify an inference that the corporation was doing business in the state. This needed to be a substantial amount of business, and the Supreme Court said in Cooper Manufacturing Co. v. Ferguson (1885) that a single act of business could not meet that test. These competing theories were discarded when the Supreme Court decided International Shoe.

=== Facts ===
The plaintiff, the State of Washington, established a tax on employers conducting business therein with the stated legislative purpose of providing a fund to be used for financial assistance to newly unemployed workers in the state. The tax was in effect a mandatory contribution to the state's Unemployment Compensation Fund. The defendant, International Shoe Company, was an American company that was incorporated in Delaware with its principal place of business ("PPB") in Missouri. The corporation had maintained for some time a staff of 11-13 salesmen in the State of Washington, working on commission. The salesmen were residents of that state and they met with prospective customers in motels and hotels, and occasionally rented space to put up displays. The company thus had no permanent "situs" of business in the State. Each year, the salesmen brought in about $31,000 in compensation. International Shoe's solicitation system allegedly was set up explicitly to avoid establishing the situs of the business in other states insofar as the salesmen did not have offices, did not negotiate prices, and sent all orders back to Missouri; shipments from the plant to customers were sent f.o.b.

=== Procedural history ===
International Shoe Co. did not pay the tax at issue in this case, so the state effected service of process on one of their salesmen with a notice of assessment. Washington also sent a letter by registered mail to their place of business in Missouri. International Shoe made a special appearance before the office of unemployment to dispute the state's jurisdiction over it as a corporate "person". However, the trial court ruled that it had personal jurisdiction over the defendant corporation. This ruling was upheld in the appeal tribunal, the Superior Court, and the Supreme Court of Washington. International Shoe Co. then appealed to the U.S. Supreme Court.

== Ruling ==
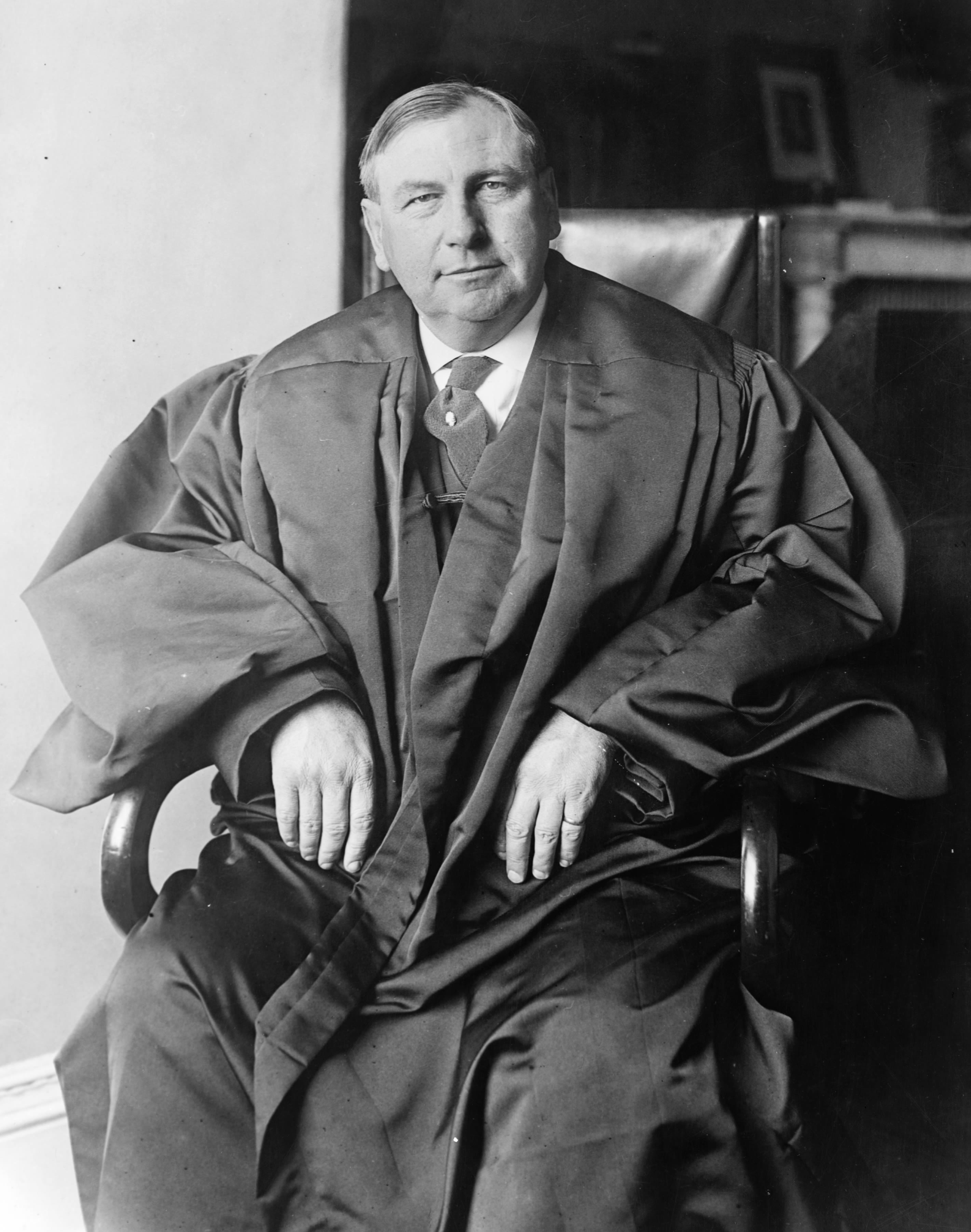
Chief Justice Harlan F. Stone

The issue involved a determination of the level of connection that must exist between a non-resident corporation and a state in order for that corporation to be sued within that state. The Supreme Court, in an opinion by Chief Justice Harlan Fiske Stone (and in which Justice Robert Jackson did not participate), held that in view of 26 U.S.C. § 1606(a) (providing that no person shall be relieved from compliance with a state law requiring payments to an unemployment fund on the ground that he is engaged in interstate commerce) the fact that the corporation is engaged in interstate commerce does not relieve it from liability for payments to the state unemployment compensation fund. The activities in behalf of the corporation render it amenable to suit in courts of the State to recover payments due to the state unemployment compensation fund. The activities in question established sufficient contacts or ties between the State and the corporation to make it reasonable and just, and in conformity to the due process requirements of the Fourteenth Amendment, for the State to enforce against the corporation an obligation arising out of such activities. In such a suit to recover payments due to the unemployment compensation fund, service of process upon one of the corporation's salesmen within the State, and notice sent by registered mail to the corporation at its home office, satisfies the requirements of due process. The tax imposed by the state unemployment compensation statute—construed by the state court, in its application to the corporation, as a tax on the privilege of employing salesmen within the State—does not violate the due process clause of the Fourteenth Amendment. In reaching its decision the Court stated that throughout American history, the jurisdiction of courts to render judgment in personam has been grounded on their de facto power over the defendant's person. Hence, his presence within the territorial jurisdiction of a court was prerequisite to its rendition of a judgment personally binding him. But now that the capias ad respondendum has given way to personal service of summons or other form of notice, due process requires only that, in order to subject a defendant to a judgment in personam, if he be not present within the territory of the forum, he have certain minimum contacts with it such that the maintenance of the suit does not offend traditional notions of fair play and substantial justice. Justice Hugo Black wrote a separate opinion, agreeing with the outcome in this case, but contending that the Court has excessively restricted the power of states to find jurisdiction over companies doing business therein.

== Analysis ==
A growing body of Supreme Court precedent and incremental statutory and common law doctrines related to personal jurisdiction had been evolving over a period of several decades from the late 19th century through the early 20th century, and the Supreme Court therefore could have upheld jurisdiction over defendant corporation. Initially the courts followed a strict interpretation of territorial jurisdiction, where states only had power over property or defendants who were actually present in the state (excepting corporations or residents). Defendants wishing to avoid claims could abscond to other jurisdictions without fear of suit.

As the doctrine of personal jurisdiction evolved with additional cases directed to related subject matter, the Supreme Court expanded jurisdiction to anyone who tacitly "consented" to jurisdiction. In one such case, Hess v. Pawloski, a defendant was held to have consented to jurisdiction by merely driving on a Massachusetts state highway. These doctrines were built upon the expanding legal fiction of "presence" within the forum state or the defendant's commission of an act or failure to act within the forum state. (A "forum state" means the state in whose courts a case is being litigated.)

In International Shoe, the Court's majority chose to create a new doctrine, while still adhering to a "presence" rationale. The basic formulation is: a state may exercise personal jurisdiction over an out-of-state defendant, so long as that defendant has "sufficient minimum contacts" with the forum state, from which the complaint arises, such that the exercise of jurisdiction "will not offend traditional notions of fair play and substantial justice ..." See 326 U.S. 310 (1940).

The court broke down the types of contact that a defendant can have with a state into "casual" contact and "systematic and continuous" contact. In cases with only casual contact, the claim must be related to the contact in order for the state to have jurisdiction. Casual contact is not a basis for bringing unrelated claims. Systematic and continuous contact allows for both claims related to the contact and unrelated claims.

=== Legal legacy ===
The ruling in International Shoe was and remains a broad doctrine. It eventually allowed states to create "long arm" statutes and responded to the actualities of the national market of the United States. Defendants had often avoided legal responsibilities by "scampering" from the state of occurrence and not being available for service of process. This case changed that to some extent, though the "traditional notions of fair play and substantial justice" are drawn from the Due Process Clause of the Fourteenth Amendment. The doctrine of International Shoe is broad, but the Court has recognized that it has limits, nevertheless.

== See also ==
- Calder v. Jones
