= Minimum contacts =

US legal term in court jurisdiction

Minimum contacts is a term used in the United States law of civil procedure to determine when it is appropriate for a court in one state to assert personal jurisdiction over a defendant from another state. The United States Supreme Court has decided a number of cases that have established and refined the principle that it is unfair for a court to assert jurisdiction over a party unless that party's contacts with the state in which that court sits are such that the party "could reasonably expect to be haled (Note: The word haled means to summon or compel a person to respond in court.) into court" in that state. This jurisdiction must "not offend traditional notions of fair play and substantial justice". A non-resident defendant may have minimum contacts with the forum state if they 1) have direct contact with the state; 2) have a contract with a resident of the state; 3) have placed their product into the stream of commerce such that it reaches the forum state; 4) seek to serve residents of the forum state; 5) have satisfied the Calder effects test; or 6) have a non-passive website viewed within the forum state.

== Consent and waiver ==
Because the need for minimum contacts is a matter of personal jurisdiction (the power of the court to hear the claim with respect to a particular party) instead of subject matter jurisdiction (the power of the court to hear this kind of claim at all), a party can explicitly or implicitly waive their right to object to the court hearing the case. Minimum contacts can be established by consent where a party signs a contract with a forum selection clause, agreeing to litigate in a specified forum.

Under the Federal Rules of Civil Procedure, a party who wishes to object to the court's jurisdiction must first sign a clause stating that they agree on the matter and will follow all laws/ rules imposed by the state and/or country, or lose the ability to raise such an objection. Furthermore, a court may request that a party provide evidence that its contacts do not rise to the level which would allow the court to have jurisdiction. The Supreme Court has held that if a party refuses to comply with such a request, the court can deem them to have waived their right to object to jurisdiction.

== Activities as a basis for jurisdiction ==
A party's activities within a state can provide the basis for that state to have jurisdiction over that party. The Supreme Court has held that the state can properly assert jurisdiction based on a party's "purposeful availment of the benefits and protections" offered by a state.

=== General vs. specific jurisdiction ===
The necessary contacts that a party must have for a state to assert personal jurisdiction may vary depending on the relationship between the contacts and the claim brought against that party. General jurisdiction exists where a court in a given state has jurisdiction over a defendant in that state irrespective of the nature of the claim; but if the state is alleged to have jurisdiction over a defendant because the defendant's activities in that state gave rise to the claim itself, this would be specific jurisdiction.

For example, if a Florida orange grower were to breach a promise to deliver a bushel of oranges to a buyer in Alabama, the breach of that agreement would be sufficient for Alabama courts to assert specific jurisdiction, even if the Florida grower had no other contacts with Alabama, and had never even set foot there. The lone contact of a promise to deliver something to a state is enough to give the state jurisdiction over disputes arising from the breach of that promise. (The mere presence of a contract is not enough to establish specific jurisdiction – Burger King Corp. v. Rudzewicz—something else is needed, maybe if there had been subsequent deliveries.) On the other hand, if one were to sue the Florida orange grower in Alabama for some matter other than that contract, the court would have to determine whether it could exercise general jurisdiction.

In Helicopteros Nacionales de Colombia v. Hall, a helicopter crash caused the death of four Americans in Peru. The Supreme Court found that the state of Texas could not assert general personal jurisdiction over the defendant company that had negotiated the purchase of helicopters and trained its pilots in Texas, because its activities in that forum were not of a continuous and systematic nature. The U.S. Supreme Court has only found general jurisdiction in one case to date, Perkins v. Benguet Mining Co., though it is routinely found at lower levels.

=== Presence ===
A party who receives service of process (formal notification that they are being sued) while physically present in a state is properly subject to personal jurisdiction in that state. The justification for the rule is uncertain. In Burnham v. Superior Court of California, the Court unanimously agreed that this rule was still effective, but split as to the rationale. Justice Scalia wrote for four justices who felt that the rule should apply simply because it was a continuation of a longstanding tradition. Justice Brennan wrote for four justices who felt that the rule should apply because the party was purposefully availing himself of the benefits of being in the state at that time, and that the rule was fair under modern standards because it was well known, therefore putting defendants on notice of their susceptibility to suit in a state if physically present. The ninth vote, by Justice Stevens, agreed that jurisdiction was proper, but did not endorse either Scalia's or Brennan's test.

=== Commercial activities ===
Merely placing products in the "stream of commerce" is insufficient to provide minimum contacts with the states where the products end up. The defendant must make an effort to market in the forum state or otherwise purposefully avail himself of the resources of that state. However, since only four of the nine Supreme Court Justices joined the opinion that required a defendant to do more than place his products in a "stream of commerce," some lower courts still rule that doing so is adequate for a court to exercise personal jurisdiction.

Claims arising from the tort of defamation are treated by a different standard.

=== Internet activities ===
Courts have struggled with the Internet as a source of minimum contacts. Although not determinately established by the Supreme Court, many courts use the Zippo test, which examines the kind of use to which a defendant's website is being put. Under this test, websites are divided into three categories:

1. passive websites, which merely provide information, will almost never provide sufficient contacts for jurisdiction. Such a website will only provide a basis for jurisdiction if the website itself constitutes an intentional tort such as slander or defamation, and if it is directed at the jurisdiction in question;
2. interactive websites, which permit the exchange of information between website owner and visitors, may be enough for jurisdiction, depending on the website's level of interactivity and commerciality, and the number of contacts which the website owner has developed with the forum due to the presence of the website;
3. commercial websites which clearly do a substantial volume of business over the Internet, and through which customers in any location can immediately engage in business with the website owner, definitely provide a basis for jurisdiction.

== Property as a basis for jurisdiction ==
The Supreme Court has held that the mere fact of ownership of property within a state is not sufficient to provide minimum contacts for a court to hear cases unrelated to that property. However, the property alone provides a sufficient contact for a court having jurisdiction over that geographic area to adjudicate claims relating to the ownership of the property, or relating to injuries which occurred there. In that case, the jurisdiction exercised by the court is referred to as in rem jurisdiction (i.e. jurisdiction over the thing), instead of in personam jurisdiction.

The U.S. Congress has enacted legislation which declares internet domain names to be property for the purposes of such jurisdiction. Therefore, when a webpage infringes a trademark, the owner of the trademark can sue in any jurisdiction where the webpage can be viewed – but only for the remedy of transferring ownership of the webpage to the trademark-holder.
