= Class Action (film) =

1991 film by Michael Apted

- Theatrical release poster
- Directed by: Michael Apted
- Written by: Carolyn Shelby; Christopher Ames; Samantha Shad
- Produced by: Ted Field; Scott Kroopf; Robert W. Cort
- Starring: Gene Hackman; Mary Elizabeth Mastrantonio
- Cinematography: Conrad Hall
- Edited by: Ian Crafford
- Music by: James Horner
- Production company: Interscope Communications
- Distributed by: 20th Century Fox
- Release date: March 15, 1991
- Running time: 105 minutes
- Country: United States
- Language: English
- Box office: $28.2 million

Class Action is a 1991 American legal drama film directed by Michael Apted. Gene Hackman and Mary Elizabeth Mastrantonio star; Laurence Fishburne, Colin Friels, Fred Dalton Thompson, and Donald Moffat are also featured. The film was entered into the 17th Moscow International Film Festival.

Class Action was released by 20th Century Fox on March 15, 1991. The film received positive reviews from critics and grossed $28.2 million.

== Plot ==
The story is about a lawsuit concerning injuries caused by a defective automobile. The suit takes on a personal dimension because the injured plaintiff's attorney, Jedediah Tucker Ward, discovers that the automobile manufacturer's attorney is his estranged daughter, Maggie Ward.

Jedediah Ward is a liberal civil rights lawyer who has based his career on helping people avoid being taken for a ride by the rich and powerful; he's pursued principle at the expense of profit, though he has a bad habit of not following up on his clients after their cases are settled.

Jed’s daughter, Maggie, has been estranged from her father since discovering that he had an affair while married to her mother, Estelle. Like her father, she pursued a career in law, but she works for a corporate law firm, and her political views differ from his.

Jed is hired to help field a lawsuit against ARGO, a major auto manufacturer, whose Meridian station wagons have a dangerous propensity to explode on impact when the left turn signal light is activated. While his research indicates that he has an all but airtight case against them, the case becomes more complicated for him when he discovers that Maggie is representing the firm he's suing.

== Cast ==
- Gene Hackman as Jedediah Tucker Ward
- Mary Elizabeth Mastrantonio as Maggie Ward
- Colin Friels as Michael Grazier
- Joanna Merlin as Estelle Ward
- Laurence Fishburne as Nick Holbrook
  (credited as Larry Fishburne)
- Donald Moffat as Quinn
- Jan Rubes as Pavel
- Matt Clark as Judge Symes
- Fred Dalton Thompson as Dr. Getchell
- Jonathan Silverman as Brian
- Anne Ramsay as Deborah

== Production notes ==
The central premise of the film is roughly analogous to the controversy surrounding the Ford Pinto and its fuel tank design. A 1977 article in Mother Jones alleged Ford was aware of the design flaw, refused to pay for a redesign, and decided it would be cheaper to pay off possible lawsuits. The magazine obtained a cost-benefit analysis that it said Ford had used to compare the cost of repairs (Ford estimated the cost to be $11 per car) against the cost of settlements for deaths, injuries, and vehicle burnouts. The memo in question was actually prepared by Ford in response to a NHTSA request for comment, it reviewed not Ford but the entire new car market and was not used to make product decisions at Ford. The document became known as the Ford Pinto Memo.

== Locations ==
Scenes of the film were shot in the restaurant of the Beach Chalet in Ocean Beach, San Francisco and show historic 1930s murals of San Francisco life by Lucien Labaudt.

== Reception ==
Class Action opened at #4 in its opening weekend with $4,207,923 and ended with a domestic gross of $24,277,858; a worldwide total of $28,277,918 was made and the film was a moderate box office success.

The film received generally positive reviews. It holds a 78% rating on Rotten Tomatoes from 27 critics. On Metacritic, it has a score of 58 out of 100 based on reviews from 18 critics, indicating "mixed or average" reviews.

== See also ==
- Grimshaw v. Ford Motor Co.
