= World-Wide Volkswagen Corp. v. Woodson =

- Supreme Court of the United States

Argued October 3, 1979 Decided January 21, 1980
- Full case name: World-Wide Volkswagen Corp. v. Woodson
- Docket no.: 78-1078
- Citations: 444 U.S. 286 (more) 100 S. Ct. 559; 62 L. Ed. 2d 490

Holding
- It is not enough that it is foreseeable that the defendant’s product would enter the forum state for that forum to obtain personal jurisdiction over the defendant, instead the defendant must purposely avail itself of the forum state.

Court membership
- Chief Justice Warren E. Burger Associate Justices William J. Brennan Jr. · Potter Stewart; Byron White · Thurgood Marshall; Harry Blackmun · Lewis F. Powell Jr. William Rehnquist · John P. Stevens

Case opinions
- Majority: White, joined by Burger, Stewart, Powell, Rehnquist, Stevens
- Dissent: Brennan
- Dissent: Marshall, joined by Blackmun
- Dissent: Blackmun

Laws applied
- U.S. Const. amend. XIV

World-Wide Volkswagen Corp v. Woodson, 444 U.S. 286 (1980), is a United States Supreme Court case involving strict products liability, personal injury and various procedural issues and considerations. The 1980 opinion, written by Justice Byron White, is included in the first-year civil procedure curriculum at nearly every American law school for its focus on personal jurisdiction.

== Background ==
=== Accident ===
Harry and Kay Robinson purchased a new Audi 100 LS automobile from Seaway Volkswagen, Inc. in Massena, New York, in 1976. The following year, as Kay Robinson passed through Oklahoma on Interstate 44 en route to the Robinsons' new home in Arizona, the Audi was struck from the rear by a drunk driver in a 1971 Ford Torino. The impact of the collision itself did not directly injure any of the Robinsons, but the crash resulted in the Audi's doors jamming shut and a puncture in the car's gas tank. A fire then severely burned the trapped Kay Robinson and her two children riding in the Audi, Eva and Sam.

=== Lawsuit ===
The Robinsons did not bring a suit against Lloyd Hull, the drunk driver. He had no insurance or assets and was therefore judgment proof. The Robinsons claimed that a product defect in the car led to the injuries they sustained—specifically, the Audi's gas tank was located beneath the trunk, in an area that the Robinsons claimed was susceptible to being punctured and igniting in a rear-end collision. They brought suit against the automobile’s manufacturer (Audi), its importer (Volkswagen of America), its regional distributor (World-Wide Volkswagen Corp.), and its retailer dealer (Seaway Volkswagen).

The Robinsons' Oklahoma attorney brought the lawsuit in state court in Creek County, Oklahoma, the county in which the accident had occurred. Creek County was at that time known as home to some of the most plaintiff sympathetic juries in the country. However, since the lawsuit met requirements for concurrent jurisdiction in both state and federal court, Audi and Volkswagen would have had the ability to ask for the case to be removed from state court in Creek County and taken directly to federal court. One of the factors which governs concurrent jurisdiction is diversity of citizenship, or whether a defendant and plaintiff are from the same state. In the case of multiple defendants, if one defendants' state citizenship matches the plaintiff's, concurrent federal jurisdiction does not apply and the case cannot be removed to federal court unless the case concerns a matter of federal law. It has therefore been stated that the reason the Robinsons' attorney added the New York regional distributor and New York dealership as defendants was to prevent Audi and Volkswagen from being able to remove the case from what was generally seen as a Creek County pro-plaintiffs' jury to what would be a federal court jury in Tulsa that might be more sympathetic to the car manufacturers' case. The Robinsons had not yet completed a move to Arizona, so they were still considered to be legal residents of New York.

The Robinsons first sued only Volkswagen of America, World-Wide, and Seaway. They later amended the suit to include Volkswagenwerk Aktiengesellschaft (Volkswagen AG), the German parent company. A second amendment was included after they learned during formal discovery that Audi NSU Auto Union Aktiengesellschaft (Audi AG) was the manufacturing parent company rather than Volkswagen AG; they substituted Audi AG for Volkswagen AG.

When they were brought in as defendants in the case, World-Wide and Seaway claimed that Oklahoma’s exercise of personal or in personam jurisdiction over them would offend the limitations on states' jurisdiction imposed by the Due Process Clause of the Fourteenth Amendment to the Constitution of the United States; they asked to be removed from the suit. Audi and Volkswagen, which sold cars in the state of Oklahoma, did not attempt to assert that the Oklahoma state court had no jurisdiction over them.

== Issue ==
Whether Seaway Volkswagen and Worldwide Volkswagen had sufficient minimum contacts with Oklahoma, such that these defendants would be subject to the jurisdiction of the Oklahoma state courts.

== Lower courts' decisions ==
The United States Supreme Court excerpts the reasoning of the Oklahoma Supreme Court in affirming that Oklahoma's long-arm statute provides for jurisdiction over World Wide and Seaway. "...the product being sold and distributed by the petitioners [World-Wide and Seaway] is by its very design and purpose so mobile that petitioners can foresee its possible use in Oklahoma. This is especially true of the distributor [Seaway], who has the exclusive right to distribute such automobile in New York, New Jersey, and Connecticut. The evidence presented below demonstrated that goods sold and distributed by the petitioners were used in the State of Oklahoma, and under the facts we believe it reasonable to infer, given the retail value of the automobile, that the petitioners derive substantial income from automobiles which from time to time are used in the State of Oklahoma. This being the case, we hold that under the facts presented, the trial court was justified in concluding that the petitioners derive substantial revenue from goods used or consumed in this State."

The emphasis on "substantial revenue" comes from the relevant long-arm statute, since repealed, stating that a court can exercise jurisdiction over persons (corporate or natural) who cause injury in Oklahoma and derive, "...substantial revenue from goods used or consumed or services rendered, in this state..."

The district court rejected World-Wide and Seaway's constitutional claim and reaffirmed that original ruling in denying petitioners’ motion for reconsideration.

== Supreme Court decision ==
The United States Supreme Court reversed the decision of the Oklahoma Supreme Court and agreed with World-Wide and Seaway that Oklahoma did not have jurisdiction over them.

The Due Process Clause of the 14th Amendment limits the power of a state court to exercise personal or in personam jurisdiction against a nonresident defendant. A state court may exercise personal jurisdiction over a nonresident only so long as there exist "minimum contacts" between the defendant and the forum state.

The court stated that the concept of minimum contacts can be seen to perform two related but distinguishable functions. It protects the defendant against the burdens of litigating in a distant or inconvenient forum and it acts to ensure that the States, through their courts, do not reach out beyond the limits imposed on them by their status as coequal sovereigns in a federal system.

The 14th Amendment provides protection against inconvenient litigation, typically described in terms of “reasonableness” or “fairness”: “Does not offend ‘traditional notions of fair play and substantial justice.” The relationship between the defendant and forum must be “reasonable.” The burden on the defendant is to be balanced against other factors, including the plaintiff’s interest in obtaining convenient and effective relief.

The due process clause “does not contemplate that a state may make binding a judgment in personam against an individual or corporate defendant with which the state has no contacts, ties or relations.” Even if the defendant would suffer minimal or no inconvenience from being forced to litigate before the tribunals of another state, even if the forum state has a strong interest in applying its law to the controversy, and even if the forum state is the most convenient location for litigation, the Due Process Clause may sometimes act to divest the state of its power to render a valid judgment.

The petitioners' contentions were deemed correct by the Supreme Court, which agreed that the two corporations did not have minimum contacts in Oklahoma, did not avail themselves of any of the privileges or benefits of Oklahoma law; Oklahoma therefore had no jurisdiction over the two companies.

The Robinson's counterclaim and Justice Brennan's dissenting opinion were based on foreseeability – a car sold in New York is mobile, and therefore it was foreseeable by World-Wide and Seaway that a car sold by them could subsequently lead to an injury in Oklahoma. The majority opinion of the Supreme Court rejected this argument, saying that foreseeability alone could not provide the basis for personal jurisdiction over a defendant and the two petitioning companies had no other contacts with Oklahoma.

== Subsequent litigation ==
With World-Wide and Seaway unable to be held as defendants in the Robinsons' case against Audi and Volkswagen, the case now had diversity of citizenship and was concurrently eligible for both state and federal court. Audi and Volkswagen removed the case from Creek County into federal district court in Tulsa, Oklahoma, where a jury sided with the two car companies. The Tulsa jury indicated that they believed the speed of Lloyd Hull's car, rather than the Audi's gas tank, was responsible for the fire.

== See also ==
- Grimshaw v. Ford Motor Co.
- Mcgee v. General Motors
- List of United States Supreme Court cases, volume 444
