= STAND-L.A. =

Stand Together Against Neighborhood Drilling (STAND-L.A.) is an environmental justice coalition of community groups that seeks to end neighborhood drilling in Los Angeles, California. The coalition hopes to establish a human health buffer around existing oil wells in Los Angeles to protect the health and safety of Angelenos affected by urban oil extraction.

== Background ==
STAND-L.A. was founded in 2013 but came together officially in 2014 under the name STAND-L.A. It organizes around several urban oil sites, including the Inglewood Oil Field, Wilmington Oil Field, and Porter Ranch. These oil extraction sites operate in the neighborhoods of coalition members.

STAND-L.A.’s founding members include:

- Communities for a Better Environment
- Esperanza Community Housing Corporation
- Holman United Methodist Church
- Liberty Hill Foundation
- Physicians for Social Responsibility – Los Angeles
- Redeemer Community Partnership
