= Mcgee v. General Motors Corp. =

1998 Florida court case

McGee v. General Motors
- Court: Broward County Circuit Court, Florida
- Decided: 18 May 1998
- Transcript: http://www.leagle.com/decision/20021847837So2d1010_21710

Court membership
- Judge sitting: Judge Arthur J. Franza

McGee v. General Motors was a 1998 court case in which the jury awarded plaintiffs Robert and Connie McGee $60 million. The trial revealed hidden information about a General Motors fuel tank design. General Motors (GM) was alleged to have sacrificed vehicle safety measures in favor of additional profit. This case was featured on CNN, 60 Minutes, The New York Times, and USA Today.

== Background ==
On July 3, 1991, Robert and Connie McGee were traveling with their children Kelly and Shane in their 1983 Oldsmobile Cutlass Cruiser. While stopped at a toll booth, the car was hit by a trailer which had disconnected from a truck several lanes away, driven by Curtis Cayton. The impact caused the trailer tongue-head to pierce the car's gas tank, resulting in a gasoline explosion.

After the accident, Shane McGee died as a result of severe burns to 98% of his body. Robert, Connie, and Kelly survived, but needed skin grafts to repair burn damage. Connie had to undergo reconstructive surgery due to extensive burns on her hands and face.

The McGees settled with the truck driver out of court, but sued General Motors for intentionally failing to provide adequate safety measures on the car.

== Trial and Verdict ==
During the trial, testimony from several former General Motors engineers showed that the design of the fuel tank was too thin and placed too close to the ground. Also, internal documents showed that the placement of a metal shield could protect the most vulnerable parts of the gas tank and greatly improve safety, at a cost of $4.50 per vehicle.

The case was tried at the Broward County Circuit Court in Ft. Lauderdale, FL, and the plaintiffs were represented by Robert W. Kelley, John J. Uustal and Sheldon Schlesinger. General Motors was represented by James Feeney, Bud Kirk, Daniel Gerber, Terrence Russell and Jay Lefkowitz. On May 18, 1998, the jury returned a verdict of $60 million in compensatory damages, and ruled that both General Motors and Curtis Cayton were at fault.

== See also ==
- Grimshaw v. Ford Motor Co.
- World-Wide Volkswagen Corp. v. Woodson
- General Motors of Canada Ltd v City National Leasing
