= Pangra =

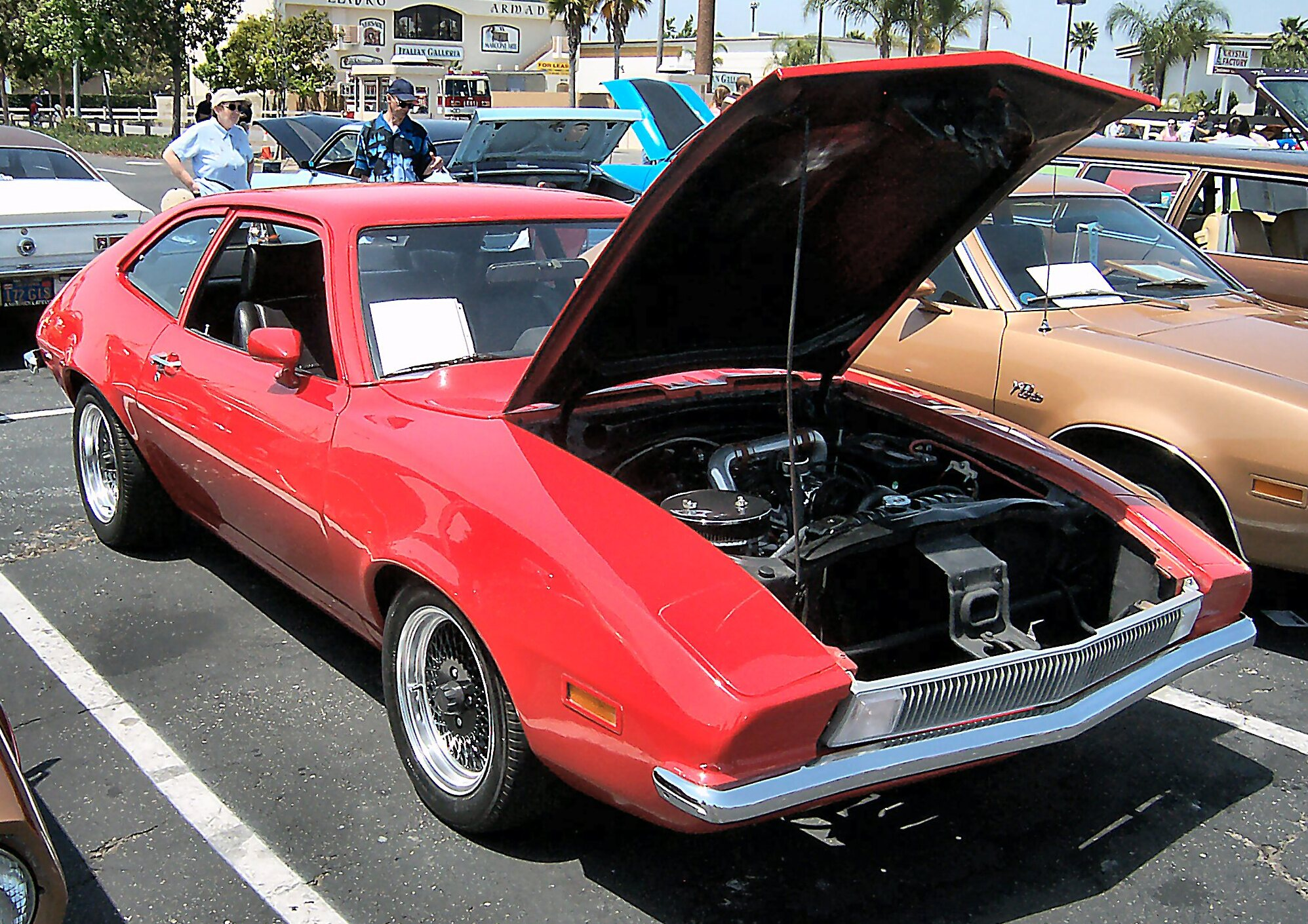

Overview
- Production: 1972–1973

Body and chassis
- Related: Ford Pinto

The Pangra is a modified version of the Ford Pinto produced from 1972–1973. The Pangra is the brainchild of Jack Stratton, then general sales manager at Huntington Ford in Arcadia, California. Production estimates vary but somewhere in the range of 20–50 complete cars were built, although many partial kits were sold as well, with estimates for those hovering in the hundreds.

== History ==
The Pangra was based on the Ford Pinto, a car which came about prior to the 1970s oil crisis and the subsequent move away from muscle cars. Jack Stratton, the Pangra's creator, wanted to build a fast, compact car that could compete with cars such as the Porsche 914 and Datsun 240Z. Stratton developed the car with Huntington Ford and the cars were all sold through the dealership. Most Pangras were based on the 2-door sedan and hatchback body styles of the Pinto, although there were a few Pangras based on the 2-door station wagon as well. The Pangra appeared on the cover of the January, 1973 issue of Motor Trend where it was tested against the Porsche 914.

== Variants ==
The Pangra could either be had as one of 4 different kits or it could be bought as a complete car from Huntington Ford with all of the equipment already installed. Kit 1 included the distinctive fiberglass front end with a revised hood, grille, fenders and hidden headlights operated by a lever in the interior. Kit 2 included all of kit 1 plus a revised interior including the dash, console and Stewart-Warner gauges including a digital tachometer, machined "Mag-Shot" wheels and bigger tires measuring 175HR13s in the front and 185HR13s at the rear. Kit 3 included everything from the first two kits as well as a Spearco "Can Am" kit which featured shortened front coil springs, heavy duty front and rear sway bars, a rear lowering kit and a full set of KONI shock absorbers. Kit 4 is the most remembered of the 4 and featured all 3 previous kits and featured an AK Miller turbocharger kit bolted to the original 2.0 liter SOHC 4 cylinder, as well as other engine upgrades bringing power up to around 175 bhp (130 kW). In addition to these kits, complete Pangras assembled at Huntington Ford also received Recaro high-back bucket seats as well as a custom console and dashboard, which could not be ordered as part of any of the kits.

== Performance ==
The Kit 4 Pangras are powered by the carbureted 2.0 liter SOHC 4 cylinder used in the Pinto but have been modified with 7:1 compression, water injection, revised header pipe, crossover intake, an O-ringed head and the aforementioned AK Miller turbocharger kit. The Pangra reportedly did 0–60 mph (97 km/h) in 7.5 seconds and made around 175 bhp (130 kW) at around 10 pounds of boost, giving it 1.42 horsepower per cubic inch. The car also could pull 0.74g on track thanks to its upgraded suspension, with Motor Trend saying the car "clings like Saran wrap". The Pangra was an early adopter of turbocharging, lacking an intercooler or any sort of device to control boost. Instead, boost was regulated by welding a washer into the exhaust to limit the amount of air which could come through. Due to this, long term reliability of these engines suffered according to accounts from owners.
