= Carbon Fuel Co. v. Mine Workers =

- Supreme Court of the United States

Decided December 10, 1979
- Full case name: Carbon Fuel Co. v. Mine Workers
- Citations: 444 U.S. 212 (more)

Holding
- National unions are not liable for the actions of local union members who engage in wildcat strikes unless they provoke the strikes.

Court membership
- Chief Justice Warren E. Burger Associate Justices William J. Brennan Jr. · Potter Stewart; Byron White · Thurgood Marshall; Harry Blackmun · Lewis F. Powell Jr. William Rehnquist · John P. Stevens

Case opinion
- Majority: Brennan, joined by unanimous

Carbon Fuel Co. v. Mine Workers, 444 U.S. 212 (1979), was a United States Supreme Court case in which the court held that national labor unions are not liable for the actions of local union members who engage in wildcat strikes unless they provoke the strikes.
