= Village of Schaumburg v. Citizens for a Better Environment =

- Supreme Court of the United States

Argued October 30, 1979 Decided February 20, 1980
- Full case name: Village of Schaumburg v. Citizens for a Better Environment
- Citations: 444 U.S. 620 (more) 100 S. Ct. 826; 63 L. Ed. 2d 73; 1980 U.S. LEXIS 78

Case history
- Prior: 590 F.2d 220 (7th Cir. 1978); cert. granted, 441 U.S. 922 (1979).
- Subsequent: Rehearing denied, 445 U.S. 972 (1980).

Holding
- Charitable appeals for funds are within the First Amendment's protection.

Court membership
- Chief Justice Warren E. Burger Associate Justices William J. Brennan Jr. · Potter Stewart; Byron White · Thurgood Marshall; Harry Blackmun · Lewis F. Powell Jr. William Rehnquist · John P. Stevens

Case opinions
- Majority: White, joined by Burger, Brennan, Stewart, Marshall, Blackmun, Powell, and Stevens
- Dissent: Rehnquist

Laws applied
- U.S. Const., Amends. I and XIV

Village of Schaumburg v. Citizens for a Better Environment, 444 U.S. 620 (1980), was a case before the United States Supreme Court.

== Background ==
A nonprofit environmental-protection organization was denied permission to solicit contributions, pursuant to a village ordinance prohibiting the door-to-door or solicitation of contributions by charitable organizations not using at least 75 percent of their receipts for "charitable purposes". This requirement exclude administrative expenses such as solicitation expenses, salaries, and overhead; thus, if more than 25 percent of the nonprofit's revenue was used to pay salaries, then it could not prove that it used at least 75 percent of its revenue for the organization's charitable purposes.

The organization sued the village in the United States District Court for the Northern District of Illinois, alleging that the ordinance's 75-percent requirement violated the First and Fourteenth Amendments.

The District Court, awarding summary judgment to the organization on the ground that the 75-percent requirement was a form of censorship prohibited by the First and Fourteenth Amendments, declared the ordinance void on its face, enjoined its enforcement, and ordered the municipality to issue a charitable solicitation permit to the organization. On appeal, the United States Court of Appeals for the Seventh Circuit affirmed, holding that although the 75-percent requirement might be valid as applied to other types of charitable solicitation, the requirement was unreasonable on its face because it barred solicitation by advocacy-oriented organizations even where it was made clear that the contributions would be used for the reasonable salaries of those who would gather and disseminate information relevant to the organization's purpose.

== Opinion of the court ==
On certiorari, the United States Supreme Court affirmed. In an opinion by White, J., joined by Burger, Ch. J., and Brennan, Stewart, Marshall, Blackmun, Powell, and Stevens, JJ., it was held that the ordinance was unconstitutionally overbroad in violation of the First and Fourteenth Amendments, since the 75-percent limitation was a direct and substantial limitation on protected activity which could not be sustained unless it served a sufficiently strong, subordinating interest that the village was entitled to protect, and the asserted substantial governmental interests in protecting the public from fraud, crime, and undue annoyance, offered as justifications for limiting protected activity, were inadequate in such regard.

Rehnquist, J., dissented, expressing the view that the ordinance, as applied to the environmental organization, was not invalid, since it affected only door-to-door solicitation for financial contributions, left little or no discretion in the hands of municipal authorities to "censor" unpopular speech, and was rationally related to the community's collective desire to bestow its largess upon organizations that were truly "charitable."

== See also ==
- Communities for a Better Environment
- List of United States Supreme Court cases
  - List of United States Supreme Court cases, volume 444
