= Ybarra v. Illinois =

- Supreme Court of the United States

Argued October 9, 1979 Decided November 28, 1979
- Full case name: Ventura Ybarra v. State of Illinois
- Citations: 444 U.S. 85 (more) 100 S. Ct.338; 62 L. Ed. 2d 238

Case history
- Prior: 58 Ill. App. 3d 57, 373 N. E. 2d 1013

Holding
- When a search warrant specifies the person or people named in the warrant to be searched and the things to be seized, there is no authority to search others not named in the warrant, unless the warrant specifically mentions that the unnamed parties are involved in criminal activity or exigent circumstances are clearly shown.

Court membership
- Chief Justice Warren E. Burger Associate Justices William J. Brennan Jr. · Potter Stewart; Byron White · Thurgood Marshall; Harry Blackmun · Lewis F. Powell Jr. William Rehnquist · John P. Stevens

Case opinions
- Majority: Stewart, joined by Brennan, White, Marshall, Powell, Stevens
- Dissent: Burger, joined by Blackmun, Rehnquist
- Dissent: Rehnquist, joined by Burger, Blackmun

Laws applied
- U.S. Const. amends. IV, XIV

Ybarra v. Illinois was a decision of the U.S. Supreme Court which ruled that a warrant can not be used to search an unnamed individual unless the warrant mentions that unnamed parties are involved or exigent circumstances are shown to exist.

== Background ==
On March 1, 1976, an agent of the Illinois Bureau of Investigation, working in Aurora, requested a search warrant to search the Aurora Tap Tavern and its bartender for evidence of heroin trafficking, after an informant, "on the weekend" of February 28–29, observed 15 to 25 packets of tinfoil on the person of a bartender only known as "Greg," along with seeing the packets on him and in a drawer behind the bar when he went there on at least 10 other occasions. The informant then claimed that he had used heroin in the past and that foil was a common packaging method for heroin. The informant also claimed that from February 28 to February 29, he had a conversation with the bartender and that the bartender told him that he would have heroin for sale on March 1. The Aurora Police Department had previous dealings with this informant, whom they considered to be reliable. The judge signed the search warrant, authorizing "the following person or place: . . . [T]he Aurora Tap Tavern. . . . Also the person of 'Greg,' the bartender, a male white with blondish hair appx. 25 years." The warrant authorized the police to search for "evidence of the offense of possession of a controlled substance," to wit, "[h]eroin, contraband, other controlled substances, money, instrumentalities and narcotics, paraphernalia used in the manufacture, processing and distribution of controlled substances."

In the late afternoon of that day, 7-8 officers proceeded to the tavern. Upon entering the property, the officers announced to all present that they were going to conduct a "cursory search for weapons." One of the officers, Jerome Johnson, conducted a pat-down on all of the 13 customers while the rest of the force focused on extensively searching the property. Later, Johnson came to Ventura Ybarra, the latter standing by a pinball machine. During the first pat-down, the officer felt an object that was described as "a cigarette pack with objects in it." Johnson did not bother to remove it, instead moving on to other patrons. Eventually, Johnson came back to Ybarra and searched him a second time. This time, he removed the cigarette packet from Ybarra's pants' pocket. When Johnson opened the package, he found six packets of foil containing a brown powder that was later identified as heroin.

=== Trial and Appeals ===
At the arraignment, Ybarra was indicted by a grand jury on the charge of unlawful possession of a controlled substance. Ybarra then filed a motion to suppress against the packets of heroin seized from his person. During the hearing on the motion, the prosecution argued that the search was justified by Section 108-9 of the Illinois Code of Criminal Procedure of 1963 (Ill. Rev. Stat. 1975, ch. 38, par. 108–9), which reads, "In the execution of the warrant the person executing the same may reasonably detain the search any person in the place at the time: (a) To protect himself from attack, or (b) To prevent the disposal or concealment of any instruments, articles or things particularly described in the warrant."

The trial court denied the motion, and Ybarra was convicted of heroin possession in a bench trial. He appealed to the Illinois Appellate Court-Second District, which upheld the conviction.

== Opinion of the Court ==
In a 6–3 majority opinion, the Supreme Court ruled that the search of Ybarra was unconstitutional against the Fourth Amendment, along with the Fourteenth Amendment, therefore, his conviction should be overturned. Justice Potter Stewart authored the opinion, arguing that Terry v. Ohio does not apply in the circumstances surrounding the case because the search warrant was only for the tavern property and the bartender, not their customers. This meant that there was no probable cause to justify the search and arrest of Ybarra.

=== Burger's dissent ===
Justice Warren E. Burger filed a dissenting opinion, joined by Justices William Rehnquist and Harry A. Blackmun, arguing that the Court has violated the rationale of Terry by limiting the scope of to "a particularized and individualized suspicion" that a person is armed and dangerous and that although, the warrant narrowed the search to the bartender, the search was valid because the tavern's patrons had a reputation for involvement in the narcotics trade, which made the possibility that they are armed reasonable. Furthermore, he stated that the officer's conduct was by-the-books, by not seizing the cigarette package first and making sure that none of the patrons were armed, and going back to Ybarra and confiscating the package. Finally, he argued that the Court was slowing the police down from suppressing the flow of narcotics into their communities.

=== Rehnquist's dissent ===
Justice William Rehnquist wrote his dissent, stating that the Court's reasoning was faulty, and claimed that since one or more of the tavern's customers could potentially be involved in the narcotics trade, the situation can escalate to dangerous levels due to the possibility of firearms. This, he reasoned, justified the search. Furthermore, he argued that Johnson's testimony during the pre-trial hearing that he had "felt objects" in the cigarette box created reasonable suspicion that heroin was in the container, which, he claimed, was within the boundaries of Terry v. Ohio. Finally, he ended by exclaiming that the search, in this case, was incidental, thus not being subject to the warrant requirement and that the search warrant was authorized by a neutral and detached magistrate, and that the officers conducted their duty pursuant to the warrant in an appropriate fashion.
