= List of United States Supreme Court cases, volume 444 =

This is a list of all the United States Supreme Court cases from volume 444 of the United States Reports:

Case name	Citation	Date decided
Pilson v. Bordenkircher	444 U.S. 1	1979
United States v. Benmar Transp. & Leasing Corp.	444 U.S. 4	1979
Transam. Mortg. Advisors, Inc. v. Lewis	444 U.S. 11	1979
Perrin v. United States	444 U.S. 37	1979
Andrus v. Allard	444 U.S. 51	1979
P.C. Pfeiffer Co. v. Ford	444 U.S. 69	1979
Ybarra v. Illinois	444 U.S. 85	1979
United States v. Kubrick	444 U.S. 111	1979
Bd. of Educ. v. Harris	444 U.S. 130	1979
Kaiser Aetna v. United States	444 U.S. 164	1979
Ferri v. Ackerman	444 U.S. 193	1979
Vaughn v. Vermilion Corp.	444 U.S. 206	1979
Carbon Fuel Co. v. Mine Workers	444 U.S. 212	1979
Strycker's Bay Neighborhood Council, Inc. v. Karlen	444 U.S. 223	1980
McLain v. Real Estate Bd.	444 U.S. 232	1980
Thompson v. United States (1980)	444 U.S. 248	1980
Vance v. Terrazas	444 U.S. 252	1980
Martinez v. California	444 U.S. 277	1980
Rush v. Savchuk	444 U.S. 320	1980
Ohio v. Kentucky	444 U.S. 335	1980
Brown v. Glines	444 U.S. 348	1980
Idaho ex rel. Evans v. Oregon	444 U.S. 380	1980
United States v. Bailey (1980)	444 U.S. 394	1980
Estes v. Metro. Branches	444 U.S. 437	1980
Sec'y of Navy v. Huff	444 U.S. 453	1980
Hatzlachh Supply Co. v. United States	444 U.S. 460	1980
Tague v. Louisiana	444 U.S. 469	1980
Boeing Co. v. van Gemert	444 U.S. 472	1980
Norfolk & W.R.R. Co. v. Liepelt	444 U.S. 490	1980
Crowell v. Mader	444 U.S. 505	1980
Snepp v. United States	444 U.S. 507	1980
Stafford v. Briggs	444 U.S. 527	1980
Ford Motor Credit Co. v. Milhollin	444 U.S. 555	1980
Seatrain Shipbuilding Corp. v. Shell Oil Co.	444 U.S. 572	1980
Cal. Brewers Ass'n v. Bryant	444 U.S. 598	1980
Village of Schaumburg v. Citizens for a Better Environment	444 U.S. 620	1980
Comm. for Pub. Educ. v. Regan	444 U.S. 646	1980
NLRB v. Yeshiva Univ.	444 U.S. 672	1980
United States v. Euge	444 U.S. 707	1980
Lenhard v. Wolff	444 U.S. 1301	1979
Peeples v. Brown	444 U.S. 1303	1979
Synanon Found., Inc. v. California	444 U.S. 1307	1979
California v. Braeseke	444 U.S. 1309	1980
Portley v. Grossman	444 U.S. 1311	1980
