= Grimshaw v. Ford Motor Co. =

Court case in California, US

- Court: Court of Appeals of California, Fourth Appellate District, Division Two
- Full case name: RICHARD GRIMSHAW, a Minor, etc., Plaintiff and Appellant, v. FORD MOTOR COMPANY, Defendant and Appellant; CARMEN GRAY, a Minor, etc., et al., Plaintiffs and Appellants, v. FORD MOTOR COMPANY, Defendant and Appellant
- Decided: May 29, 1981
- Citation: 119 Cal.App.3d 757

Court membership
- Judges sitting: Tamura (Acting P.J.); McDaniel · Kaufman

Case opinions
- Decision by: Tamura, joined by McDaniel
- Concurrence: Kaufman

Grimshaw v. Ford Motor Company (119 Cal.App.3d 757, 174 Cal.Rptr. 348) was a personal injury tort case decided in Orange County, California in February 1978 and affirmed by a California appellate court in May 1981. The lawsuit involved the safety of the design of the Ford Pinto automobile, manufactured by the Ford Motor Company. The jury awarded plaintiffs $127.8 million in damages, the largest ever in US product liability and personal injury cases. Grimshaw v. Ford Motor Company was one of the most widely publicized of the more than a hundred lawsuits brought against Ford in connection with rear-end accidents in the Pinto. The trial judge reduced the jury's punitive damages award to $3.5 million.

On appeal, Ford contested the trial court judgement on the basis of errors, and contested the punitive damages award on the grounds of an absence of malice and that the punitive damages award was not authorized by statute and was unconstitutional. The appellate court affirmed the trial court.

== Trial ==
A 1972 Pinto rear-end impact and fire in San Bernardino, California, resulted in the death of the driver Lilly Gray and severe injury to passenger Richard Grimshaw. Gray's family and Grimshaw filed separate suits against Ford, but the actions were consolidated for trial. The jury awarded $127.8 million in damages; $125 million in punitive damages, and $2,841,000 in compensatory damages to Grimshaw and $665,000 in compensatory damages to the Gray family. The jury award was the largest ever in US product liability and personal injury cases. The jury award was the largest against an automaker until a $150 million verdict in a 1996 case, Hardy vs. General Motors.

The judge reduced the jury's punitive damages award to $3.5 million, which he later said was "still larger than any other punitive damage award in the state by a factor of about five."

=== Reaction ===
University of California Los Angeles law professor Gary T. Schwartz, writing in 1990, said that the jury verdict was plausible, and that the "core of the Pinto story" was:

Given this description of the Pinto's design problem, some comments can be offered on the decision-making process within Ford that resulted in the Pinto. As shown above, a famous Ford report cannot be interpreted as showing Ford balancing lives against dollars in designing the Pinto. To state that the report does not itself reveal such a process does not mean, however, that such a process did not take place. Accordingly, I have consulted the Grimshaw record to learn what light it sheds on this question. As far as basic gas tank location is concerned, I am persuaded that the trunk capacity problem, in conjunction with American auto custom, provides the best explanation for Ford's choice to place the Pinto gas tank behind the axle. As for additional design proposals brought forward by the plaintiffs, several of them-for example, a bladder within the gas tank, and a "tank within the tank"-concerned somewhat innovative technology that had never been utilized in actual auto production. At trial, there was testimony that a bladder would have been feasible in the early 1970's, but also rebuttal testimony that a bladder was at this time beyond the bounds of feasibility. The jury's general verdict does not reveal whether and how the jury resolved such conflicts in the evidence; and I am in no position to resolve them here. Consider now, however, the combination of a stronger bumper, a smooth (bolt-free) differential, and the addition of both hat sections and horizontal cross-members. This combination of design changes clearly would have improved the Pinto's safety to some appreciable extent. According to the evidence, the overall cost of this combination would have been $9; and it makes sense to assume that these items were turned down by Ford in planning the Pinto primarily on account of their monetary costs. It is plausible to believe, then, that because of these costs, Ford decided not to improve the Pinto's design, knowing that its decision would increase the chances of the loss of consumer life. Once a variety of misconceptions are stripped away, this limited core of the Pinto story remains. And this is a core that may well be strong enough to support the "myth" of the Ford Pinto case in the second of the meanings described above. What follows is my effort to explicate the elements of that myth.

According to the Los Angeles Times in 2010, the award "signalled to the auto industry that it would be harshly sanctioned for ignoring known defects."

== Appeal ==
In discussing the appellate court findings of fact Schwartz (1990) notes that the appellate court was under strict rules of interpretation. He states:

For reasons quite beyond the court's control, its opinion must be treated cautiously as a source of actual facts. Because the defendant was appealing a jury verdict in favor of the plaintiffs, the court was under an obligation to view all the evidence in a way most favorable to the plaintiffs and essentially to ignore evidence in the record that might be favorable to the defendant. See id. at 773, 820, 174 Cal. Rptr. at 359, 388. In fact, Ford's basic position at trial-which the court's opinion at no point mentions-was that the approaching car (a Ford Galaxie) had not slowed down at all, and had struck the Gray car at a speed in excess of 50 miles per hour [80 km/h]. There was an enormous amount of evidence at trial supporting each of the parties' factual claims as to the Galaxie's closing speed. Had the jury accepted Ford's speed estimate, there would not have been much of an issue of crashworthiness: for the plaintiffs' position throughout trial was that even a state-of-the-art fuel system could not maintain integrity in a 50-mile-per-hour [80 km/h] collision.

=== Appellate court findings of fact ===
The trial court's findings of fact regarding the accident, the design of the Pinto, Ford's crash testing, and Ford's cost benefit analysis were not contested on appeal, and were accepted by the appellate court "in accordance with established principles of appellate review."

==== The accident ====
A 1972 Ford Pinto hatchback stalled on a freeway, erupting into flames when it was rear-ended by a Ford Galaxie proceeding in the same direction. Lilly Gray, the driver of the Pinto, suffered severe burns to her entire body and resulted in her death by congestive heart failure on her way to the hospital. 13-year-old Richard Grimshaw, a passenger, suffered severe, permanently disfiguring burns to his entire body. Grimshaw underwent numerous skin grafts and extensive surgeries, but still lost portions of the fingers on his left hand and his left ear in the accident. Doctors estimated that Grimshaw would require many more surgeries within the next 10 years.

The plaintiff's expert testified that the Pinto's gas tank was pushed forward upon impact and punctured by a flange or bolt on the differential housing. Fuel sprayed from the tank and entered the passenger compartment through the gaps between the rear wheel wells and the floor.

==== Design of the Pinto fuel system ====
In 1968, Ford began designing the subcompact car that would eventually become known as the Pinto.

The courts found that Lee Iacocca, at the time a vice president at Ford, conceived the Pinto "project and was its moving force" and said that "Ford's objective was to build a car at or below 2,000 pounds to sell for no more than $2,000." The courts described the Pinto as a "rush project," and said that while standard automotive industry practice was that "engineering studies precede the styling," in the case of the Pinto project "styling preceded engineering and dictated engineering design to a greater degree than usual."

The court found that the Pinto's styling required the gas tank to be placed behind the rear axle, instead of over the rear axle as was "the preferred practice in Europe and Japan" and that the Pinto had "only 9 or 10 inches" (23–25 cm) of "crush space," "far less than in any other American automobile or Ford overseas subcompact." The court found that the Pinto's bumper "was little more than a chrome strip, less substantial than the bumper of any other American car produced then or later." The court found that the Pinto's rear structure lacked reinforcement "found in all automobiles produced by Ford's overseas operations," rendering the Pinto "less crush resistant than other vehicles." The court found that a flange and a line of bolts on the Pinto's differential housing "were sufficient to puncture a gas tank driven forward upon rear impact."

==== Crash tests ====
Ford tested two production models of the Pinto and prototypes, some of which "were true duplicates of the design car," "to determine, among other things, the integrity of the fuel system in rear-end accidents." Proposed federal regulations required impacts "without significant fuel spillage," up to 20 miles per hour (32 km/h) impacts by 1972 and 30 miles per hour (48 km/h) by 1973.

Crash tests proved that the Pinto could not meet the proposed regulations. A collision from the rear "caused the fuel tank to be driven forward and to be punctured, causing fuel leakage." A collision of a production Pinto "caused the fuel neck to be torn from the gas tank and the tank to be punctured by a bolt head on the differential housing." In at least one test collision "spilled fuel entered the driver's compartment through gaps resulting from the separation of the seams joining the rear wheel wells to the floor pan," separations due in part to "the lack of reinforcement in the rear structure."

Ford tested modified Pinto prototypes, which "proved safe at speeds at which the Pinto failed," including modifications to line the fuel tank with a rubber bladder, to locate the fuel tank above rather than behind the rear axle, and to add reinforcement.

==== The cost to remedy design deficiencies ====
The courts found that, while "the standard of care for engineers in the industry" after a failed safety test was to "redesign and retest," and although fixes were inexpensive, "Ford produced and sold the Pinto to the public without doing anything to remedy the defects."

Design changes that would have enhanced the fuel system at very little cost included:

- Longitudinal side members: $2.40 ea.
- Cross members: $1.80 ea.
- Shock absorbing "flak suit" for the fuel tank: $4.00
- Tank within a tank and placement of the tank over the rear axle: $5.08 to $5.79
- Nylon bladder within the tank: $5.25 to $8.00
- Placement of the tank over the rear axle with a protective barrier: $9.95
- Substitution of rear axle with a smooth differential housing: $2.10
- Protective shield between differential housing and fuel tank: $2.35
- Improvement and reinforcement of rear bumper: $2.60
- Additional 8 inches (200 mm) crush space: $6.40

Equipping the car with a reinforced rear structure, smooth axle, improved bumper and additional crush space at a total cost of $15.30 would have made the fuel tank safe in a 34-to-38-mile-per-hour [55 to 61 km/h] rear-end collision by a vehicle the size of the Ford Galaxie. If, in addition to the foregoing, a bladder or tank within a tank were used or if the tank were protected with a shield, it would have been safe in a 40-to-45-mile-per-hour [64 to 72 km/h] rear impact. If the tank had been located over the rear axle, it would have been safe in a rear impact at 50 miles per hour [80 km/h] or more.

==== Management knowledge ====
The Pinto project team held regular product review meetings chaired and attended by Ford vice presidents. The Pinto was approved by Ford's Product Planning Committee, which included Iacocca and other Ford vice presidents. At an April, 1971 product review meeting, a report prepared by Ford engineers entitled "Fuel System Integrity Program Financial Review" was distributed and discussed, which referred to the crash tests of Ford vehicles and estimated the financial impact of design changes to comply with the proposed federal fuel system integrity standards. The report recommended deferring fixes in order to accrue cost savings. Harley Copp, a former Ford engineer and the executive in charge of the crash testing program, "testified that the highest level of Ford's management made the decision to go forward with the production of the Pinto, knowing that the gas tank was vulnerable to puncture and rupture at low rear impact speeds creating a significant risk of death or injury from fire and knowing that 'fixes' were feasible at nominal cost."

=== Disposition of appeals ===
The appellate court affirmed the trial court.

==== Defendant's appeals ====
Ford contested the trial court judgement on the basis of errors, and contested the punitive damages award on the grounds of an absence of malice and that the punitive damages award was not authorized by statute and was unconstitutional.

===== Errors =====
The appellate court "concluded that Ford has failed to demonstrate that any errors or irregularities occurred during the trial which resulted in a miscarriage of justice requiring reversal."

Ford contended that the trial court erroneously admitted Ford's "Fuel System Integrity Program Financial Review" report as irrelevant and prejudicial. In the document, Ford engineers recommending deferring the installation of "flak suits" or "bladders," available at a cost of $4 to $8 per car, in all Ford cars to 1976, which allowed the company to realize a savings of $20.9 million. The appellate court ruled that the report was highly relevant in that "A reasonable inference may be drawn from the evidence that despite management's knowledge that the Pinto's fuel system could be made safe at a cost of but $4 to $8 per car, it decided to defer corrective measures to save money and enhance profits."

===== Punitive damages =====
Ford contended the punitive damages on two grounds: 1) punitive damages are statutorily and constitutionally impermissible in design defect cases; and 2) there was no evidentiary support for a finding of malice or corporate responsibility for malice.

Punitive damages in design defect cases

The appellate court found no statutory impediments to punitive damages and said that "Ford's contention that the statute is unconstitutional has been repeatedly rejected."

Malice

Ford contended that the "Exemplary damages" section of California's civil code required an "evil motive," or an intent to injure the person harmed, for punitive damages, and argued absence of malice. The appellate court cited precedent that "malice" as used in California's "Exemplary damages" code included "not only a malicious intention to injure the specific person harmed, but conduct evincing 'a conscious disregard of the probability that the actor's conduct will result in injury to others.'" In Taylor v. Superior Court, the California Superior Court held that a conscious disregard of the safety of others is sufficient to meet the animus malus required for punitive damages awards, adding: "In order to justify an award of punitive damages on this basis, the plaintiff must establish that the defendant was aware of the probable dangerous consequences of his conduct, and that he wilfully and deliberately failed to avoid those consequences." In a commercial context, the imposition of punitive damages deters the furtherance of "objectional corporate policies" and encourages the remedy of safety concerns that might otherwise go unchecked.

According to the appellate court decision,

There was ample evidence to support a finding of malice and Ford's responsibility for malice. Through the results of the crash tests Ford knew that the Pinto's fuel tank and rear structure would expose consumers to serious injury or death in a 20-to-30-mile-per-hour [32 to 48 km/h] collision. There was evidence that Ford could have corrected the hazardous design defects at minimal cost but decided to defer correction of the shortcomings by engaging in a cost-benefit analysis balancing human lives and limbs against corporate profits. Ford's institutional mentality was shown to be one of callous indifference to public safety. There was substantial evidence that Ford's conduct constituted "conscious disregard" of the probability of injury to members of the consuming public...There is substantial evidence that management was aware of the crash tests showing the vulnerability of the Pinto's fuel tank to rupture at low speed rear impacts with consequent significant risk of injury or death of the occupants by fire. There was testimony from several sources that the test results were forwarded up the chain of command;...While much of the evidence was necessarily circumstantial, there was substantial evidence from which the jury could reasonably find that Ford's management decided to proceed with the production of the Pinto with knowledge of test results revealing design defects which rendered the fuel tank extremely vulnerable on rear impact at low speeds and endangered the safety and lives of the occupants. Such conduct constitutes corporate malice.

Ford argued that the amount awarded in punitive damages was excessive. The test for deciding whether the amount was excessive as a matter of law or was so grossly disproportionate as to raise the presumption that it was the product of passion or prejudice is four-prong: 1) the degree of reprehensibility of defendant's conduct; 2) wealth of the defendant; 3) the amount of compensatory damages; and 4) an amount which would serve as a deterrent effect on like conduct by the defendant and others. The appellate court held that

...the conduct of Ford's management was reprehensible in the extreme. It exhibited a conscious and callous disregard of public safety in order to maximize corporate profits...Ford's tortious conduct endangered the lives of thousands of Pinto purchasers. Weighed against the factor of reprehensibility, the punitive damage award as reduced by the trial judge was not excessive."

In light of Ford's 7.7 billion dollar net worth and 983 million dollar income after taxes in 1976, the court found that the punitive award was approximately 0.005% of Ford's net worth and 0.03% of its income. The ratio of punitive damages to compensatory damages was approximately 1.4:1. Significantly, Ford did not argue about the excessiveness of the compensatory damages. Lastly, the punitive award was sufficient to require Ford to take notice, rather than allowing the company to write it off as a mere business expense.

==== Plaintiff's appeals ====
Grimshaw appeals from the order granting a conditional new trial and from the amended judgment entered pursuant to the order. Grimshaw argues that 1) the punitive damages awarded by the jury were not excessive as a matter of law; 2) the specification of reasons was inadequate; and 3) the court abused its discretion in cutting the award so drastically. The appellate court held that the trial court did not err in reducing the jury's award of punitive damages from more than 122 million to 3.5 million or in granting a new trial for excessive damages. There was no evidence showing that the trial judge abused his discretion, nor that he acted in any way that was not fair and reasonable under the circumstances.

== See also ==
- Mcgee v. General Motors
- World-Wide Volkswagen Corp. v. Woodson
- Dodge v. Ford Motor Company

== Bibliography ==
- Gladwell, Malcolm (May 4, 2015). "The Engineer's Lament". The New Yorker.
- Grimshaw v. Ford Motor Co., 119 CA3d 757 (Cal. App. 1981).
- Sherefkin, Robert (June 16, 2003). "Lee Iacocca's Pinto: A fiery failure". Automotive News.
