= Communities for a Better Environment =

Policy-focused non-profit organization

Communities for a Better Environment (CBE), previously known as Citizens for a Better Environment, is an American policy-focused non-profit organization started in 1971 by Mark Anderson in Chicago, Illinois. In the late 1970s and early 1980s, CBE expanded to California, Wisconsin, and Minnesota. CBE established itself in San Francisco in 1978 and expanded to Los Angeles in 1982. Today, CBE is based in Oakland, CA and Huntington Park, CA. CBE was the first environmental organization to practice door-to-door canvassing by directly involving community members. In 1980, CBE won the United States Supreme Court decision on Village of Schaumburg v. Citizens for a Better Environment 444 U.S. 620, protecting the right of charities to conduct door-to-door solicitation under the 1st and 14th amendments to the United States Constitution.

== About ==
CBE's mission is "to build people’s power in California’s communities of color and low income communities to achieve environmental health and justice by preventing and reducing pollution and building green, healthy and sustainable communities and environments." CBE promotes access to clean air and drinking water as an intrinsic human right.

CBE expresses urgency to implement and influence environmental justice in California. They are also committed to global participation in addressing present and future environmental concerns. CBE Communications Coordinator, Steven Low, says the future of CBE will involve urban agriculture, food justice, and “adaptation” as a response to climate change. CBE is sponsoring the Charge Ahead Campaign which will "help put one million electric cars, trucks and busses on California's roads, reducing air pollution, improving health and saving money". Charge Ahead is sponsored by several organizations and designated $200 million from the states cap and trade auctions, whereby CBE advocates for low income communities of color's access to zero emission transportation.

=== Early work ===
CBE began with grassroots organizing. In 1977, CBE opened an office in San Francisco, California, to advocate against the Diablo Canyon Power Plant. In 1983, Toxics in the Bay, a report and investigation of Bay Area toxic secretion, held Chevron and others accountable for toxic discharge in the 1985 Basin Plan Discharge Program. The Basin Plan expanded to become the San Francisco Bay Region Basin Plan in 2004. The plan complied with California State and Federal anti-degradation policies awaiting approval by San Francisco State Water Board and the US Environmental Protection Agency. CBE pressured Bay Area Quality Management District to reevaluate the permit granted to Kaiser Cement and Gypsum Corporation resulting in sulfur dioxide reduction by 50% and limiting use of perchloroethylene, aka Tetrachloroethylene, in Vallejo, California, which is used in the dry-cleaning process.

== Research approach ==
CBE focuses on educating low-income communities of color and advocating engagement via community meetings, political education, and school groups, where people are empowered to fight local pollution by working together toward achieving healthier communities. CBE also values scientific research to fully comprehend the direct and indirect consequences of toxicity and chemical secretion. Using secondary data and partnering with health providers and academic institutions, CBE conducts research on human subjects and online training for human subject protection via the National Institute of Health website.

=== Case studies ===
1. Community-Based Participatory Research as a Tool for Policy Change: A Case Study of the Southern California Environmental Justice Collaborative. CBE collaborated with Liberty Hill Foundation and an academic research team from University of California, Santa Cruz, Brown University, and Occidental College to have Rule 1402 reviewed. Rule 1402, included in the South Coast Air Quality Management District was the state's goal in 1994 to reduce public health risk from cancerous and noncancerous emissions by large industries. The maximum individual cancer risk was initially set at 100 cancer risks per million, yet due to CBE's collaboration, it was reduced to 25 cancer risks per million 6 years later, representing a reduction in acceptable risk levels to 75%. This collaboration led to more efforts in the reduction of allowable risk level faced by various communities and encouraged the California Environmental Protection Agency to broaden their view on issues such as these, to put more emphasis on risk exposure when making new policies.

2. Linking Exposure Assessment Science With Policy Objectives for Environmental Justice and Breast Cancer Advocacy: The Northern California Household Exposure Study. CBE's research contributed to an investigation of a high amount of pollutants increasing a woman's chance of getting cancer. In the United States, African American women have the highest rate of cancer and mortality than any other race.

==== Chevron Richmond refinery ====
CBE and two organizations conducted the research in the Richmond health survey and it showed that the chemical exposures in Richmond were extremely high. When contrasted with Bolinas, as seen in the case study, Richmond's air pollution was far worse, and this could be due to the Chevron Refinery. Chevron is the largest employer in town but as CBE research has shown, compared with the statewide average for all business activity oil refining creates ten times fewer jobs.

- In 2009, CBE and other local organizations filed a petition to have the Chevron Refinery's plan to expand looked at once more. Expanding its facility would have allowed them to process dirty crude oil, increasing greenhouse gases and toxic emissions to local communities. The expansion was stopped because CBE argued that the Environmental Impact Statement violated the California Environmental Quality Act since it didn't take into consideration how this would increase the pollution in the city.
- Richmond came up with the General Plan 2030, and its goal is to become more sustainable and also develop healthy neighborhoods by 2030. As part of this plan, Richmond's Planning Commission supported CBE's campaign, Less Pollution, More Jobs in 2012.

=== Southern California ===
CBE works with various southern California communities which are among the most polluted in the country. The Los Angeles area, Riverside communities, San Bernardino, and Orange County were ranked the smoggiest areas in the nation in 2012 when it comes to air pollution. CBE works with other cities in southern California like Wilmington, Huntington Park, and various cities along Interstate 710, to minimize the exposure to residents living near those areas. The Southern California offices are also well versed in community action, with youth subgroups joining CBE ranks to fight for environmental injustice in their heavily impacted, people of color communities. Beginning in 1997, the sub-program, Youth for Environmental Justice has extended its reach over the past few years, from demonstrating its influence in Sacramento, the state capital; to providing support at the grassroot march in Paris 2016.

==== Huntington Park ====
- Huntington Park is near the Los Angeles area and air pollution is not the only environmental problem because it has a lot of “brownfields”, which are abandoned or unused land used for activities that may have left the land contaminated. As of now the EPA is funding this project and the city of Huntington Park, CBE, and local residents have begun the transformation from brownfield areas into sustainable areas.

==== Wilmington Area ====
- CBE and other community groups are working with the Wilmington/Carson area, which is exposed to high amounts of local pollution. This exposure puts those communities at risk of cardiovascular and respiratory diseases, among others. These communities have proposed a policy called "Clean Up, Green Up", aiming to reduce and prevent pollution in severely affected communities. This policy hopes to create Green Zones in these communities where the shift to green, sustainable communities will be encouraged.
- The Clean Up Green Up policy was approved by the Los Angeles City Council in 2011, and since then CBE has been working alongside the community in order to make this policy provide stronger regulation to polluting facilities.

==== I-710 ====
- The Interstate 710 freeway is 23 miles long and it runs from the Long Beach port to the City of Alhambra. There has been planning to expand the I-710 in order to make it easier to transport to and from the port, but many oppose it because it will increase pollution leading to more exposure to the communities around it. CBE worked with other organizations to create the Community Alternative 7 plan, which calls for improvements to be made along the I-710 to minimize pollution.

== Collaborations and coalitions ==
CBE is a member of the California Environmental Justice Alliance (CEJA). Over 35 community-based organizations, including CBE, make up the Climate Justice Alliance (CJA) where they work towards the usage of sustainable energy in local communities. Grassroots Global Justice Alliance (GGJ), is made of various community groups including CBE, working with communities of color faced with the most environmental pollution and toxics. In regards to the expansion of the I-710, CBE and the Coalition for Environmental Health and Justice (CEHAJ) have worked together to create the Community Alternative 7 to improve the environmental conditions along I-710 corridor. CBE focuses on the people employed by toxic facilities and works with Don't Waste LA, in order to create a proposal for community protection to further exposure. This proposal would require them to reduce toxic waste. Green LA Coalition, Communities for a Better Environment, and other environmental justice groups, are focusing on LA in order to minimize the communities’ exposure to pollutants. In the chevron case CBE also worked alongside Asian Pacific Environmental Network to have Chevron's permit reviewed. Local Clean Energy Alliance is made up of 70 organizations that call for renewable energy, pollutant reduction, and green jobs in California. It is also a member of the Bay Area Environmental Health Collaborative (BAEHC) working towards the reduction of pollution in vulnerable low income communities of color. CBE also has a partnership with Richmond Equitable Development Initiative's to brainstorm activities which may increase the communities’ advocacy for a specific problem. CBE has been a member of the Oakland Climate Action Coalition (OCAC), their efforts have allowed the inclusion of climate justice and health policies into the Oakland's Climate Action Plan.

== CBE in the media ==
Andres Soto, CBE organizer, was quoted about his discontent with the permit process of BAAQMD in the East Bay Express. CBE is mentioned in the UK news outlet The Guardian as an organization working with Asian Pacific Environmental Network in promoting solar power in Richmond, California.
