= Ford Pinto =

Ford subcompact car (1970–1980)

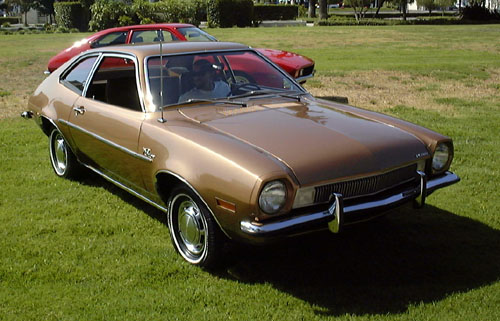
- Ford Pinto

Overview
- Manufacturer: Ford
- Also called: Mercury Bobcat
- Production: September 1970 – July 1980
- Model years: 1971–1980 (Pinto); 1974–1980 (Bobcat)
- Assembly: United States: Edison, New Jersey (Edison Assembly); Milpitas, California (San Jose Assembly); Canada: Southwold, Ontario (St. Thomas Assembly)
- Designer: Robert Eidschun (1968)

Body and chassis
- Class: Subcompact car
- Body style: 2-door sedan; 2-door sedan delivery; 2-door station wagon; 3-door hatchback
- Layout: FR layout
- Chassis: Unibody
- Related: Mercury Bobcat; Ford Mustang II

Powertrain
- Engine: 97.6 cu in (1.6 L) Kent I4; 122.0 cu in (2.0 L) EAO I4; 140.4 cu in (2.3 L) L23 I4; 170.9 cu in (2.8 L) Cologne V6
- Transmission: 4-speed manual; 3-speed C3/"Selectshift/Cruise-O-Matic" automatic

Dimensions
- Wheelbase: 94.0 in (2,388 mm)
- Length: 163 in (4,140 mm)
- Width: 69.4 in (1,763 mm)
- Height: 50 in (1,270 mm)
- Curb weight: 2,015–2,270 lb (914–1,030 kg) (1971)

Chronology
- Predecessor: Ford Cortina (captive import)
- Successor: Ford Escort / Mercury Lynx

The Ford Pinto is a subcompact car that was manufactured and marketed by Ford Motor Company in North America from 1970 until 1980. The Pinto was the first subcompact vehicle produced by Ford in North America.

The Pinto was marketed in three body styles across its production: a two-door fastback sedan with a trunk, a three-door hatchback, and a two-door station wagon. Mercury offered rebadged versions of the Pinto as the Mercury Bobcat from 1975 until 1980 (1974–1980 in Canada).

Over three million Pintos were manufactured over its ten-year production run, outproducing the combined totals of its domestic rivals, the Chevrolet Vega and the AMC Gremlin. Along with the Pinto, approximately 224,000 Bobcats were manufactured from 1975 until 1980, at Edison Assembly in Edison, New Jersey, St. Thomas Assembly in Southwold, Ontario, and San Jose Assembly in Milpitas, California.

In the 1970s, the safety reputation of the Pinto became a point of controversy. The design of the car's fuel tank attracted intense media and government scrutiny after several deadly fires following fuel tank ruptures associated with rear-end collisions. Subsequent analysis of the design's overall safety suggested it was comparable to other 1970s subcompact cars. The safety issues surrounding the Pinto and the subsequent response by Ford have been cited widely as business ethics and tort reform case studies.

== Background ==
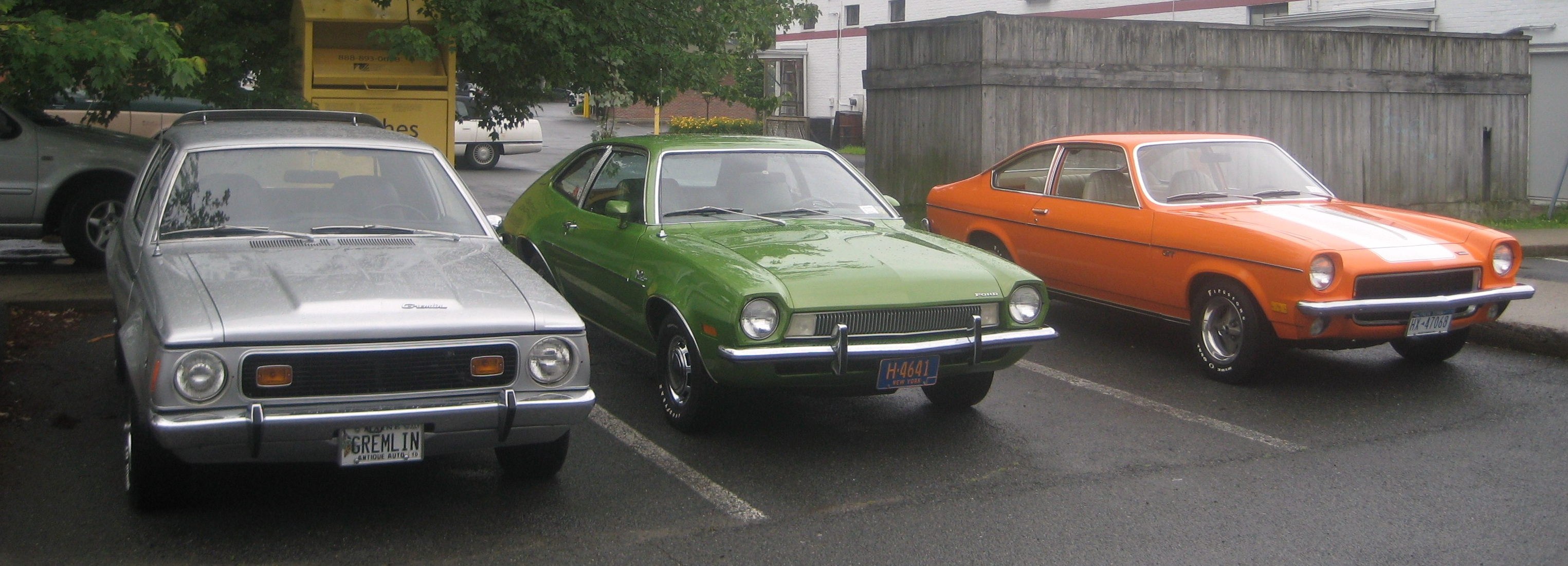
First-generation American subcompacts, left to right: AMC Gremlin, Ford Pinto, Chevrolet Vega

American automakers had first countered imports such as the Volkswagen Beetle with compact cars including the Ford Falcon, Ford Maverick, Chevrolet Corvair and Plymouth Valiant, although these cars featured six-cylinder engines and comprised a larger vehicle class. As the popularity of smaller Japanese imports Toyota Corolla and Datsun 510 increased throughout the 1960s, Ford North America responded by introducing the Cortina from Ford of Europe as a captive import. American automakers introduced their subcompacts, led by the AMC Gremlin that arrived six months before the Pinto, and the Chevrolet Vega, introduced the day before the Pinto.

Named after a type of horse with a distinctive coat, the Pinto was introduced on September 11, 1970, using a completely new platform along with a powertrain from the European-specification Escort. Ford Chairman Henry Ford II himself purchased a 1971 Runabout (hatchback) as one of his personal cars.

== Product development ==
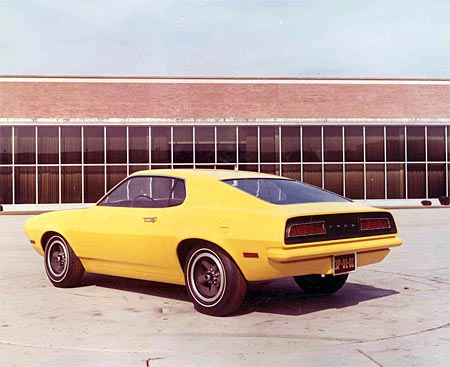
Ford Pinto design proposal, 1970

Initial planning for the Pinto began in the summer of 1967, it was recommended by Ford's Product Planning Committee in December 1968, and was approved by Ford's board of directors in January 1969. Ford President Lee Iacocca wanted a 1971 model that weighed under 2,000 lb (900 kg) and that would be priced at less than US$2,000 ($17,559 in 2025 dollars). The Pinto product development, from conception through delivery, was completed in 25 months when the automotive industry average was 43 months, the shortest production planning schedule in automotive history at the time. Some development processes usually conducted sequentially were conducted in parallel. Machine tooling overlapped with product development, which froze the basic design. Decisions that threatened the schedule were discouraged; the attitude of Ford management was to develop the Pinto as quickly as possible. Iacocca ordered a rush project to build the car, and the Pinto became known internally as "Lee's car". The Pinto's bodywork was styled by Robert Eidschun.

Offered with an inline-four engine and bucket seats the Pinto's mechanical design was conventional, with unibody construction, a longitudinally mounted engine in front driving the rear wheels through either a manual or automatic transmission and live axle rear end. The suspension was by unequal-length control arms with front coil springs while the live rear axle was mounted on leaf springs. The rack and pinion steering optionally had power assist, as did the brakes. Ford had not offered a four-cylinder engine in North America since the cancellation of the Ford Model A engine in 1934 when the Ford Model B was discontinued. The Kent engine was sourced from Ford of England.

== Production history ==
On September 11, 1970, Ford introduced the Pinto under the tagline The Little Carefree Car.

After structural design on alternate body styles encountered obstacles, Ford offered the Pinto solely as a two-door sedan, with entry-level models priced at $1,850, undercutting GM's Chevrolet Vega and directly targeting imported models – which included such new competitors as the Mazda 1200 in 1971, the Subaru DL in 1972, and the Honda Civic in 1973.

The Pinto had sold over 100,000 units by January 1971, and 352,402 for the entire 1971 production run; 1974 saw the most Pintos produced in a single model year, with 544,209 units.

Calendar year	1971	1972	1973	1974	1975	1976	1977	1978	1979	1980
Units	352,402	480,405	484,512	544,209	223,763	290,132	225,097	188,899	199,018	185,054
Total production 3,173,491

=== 1971–1973 ===
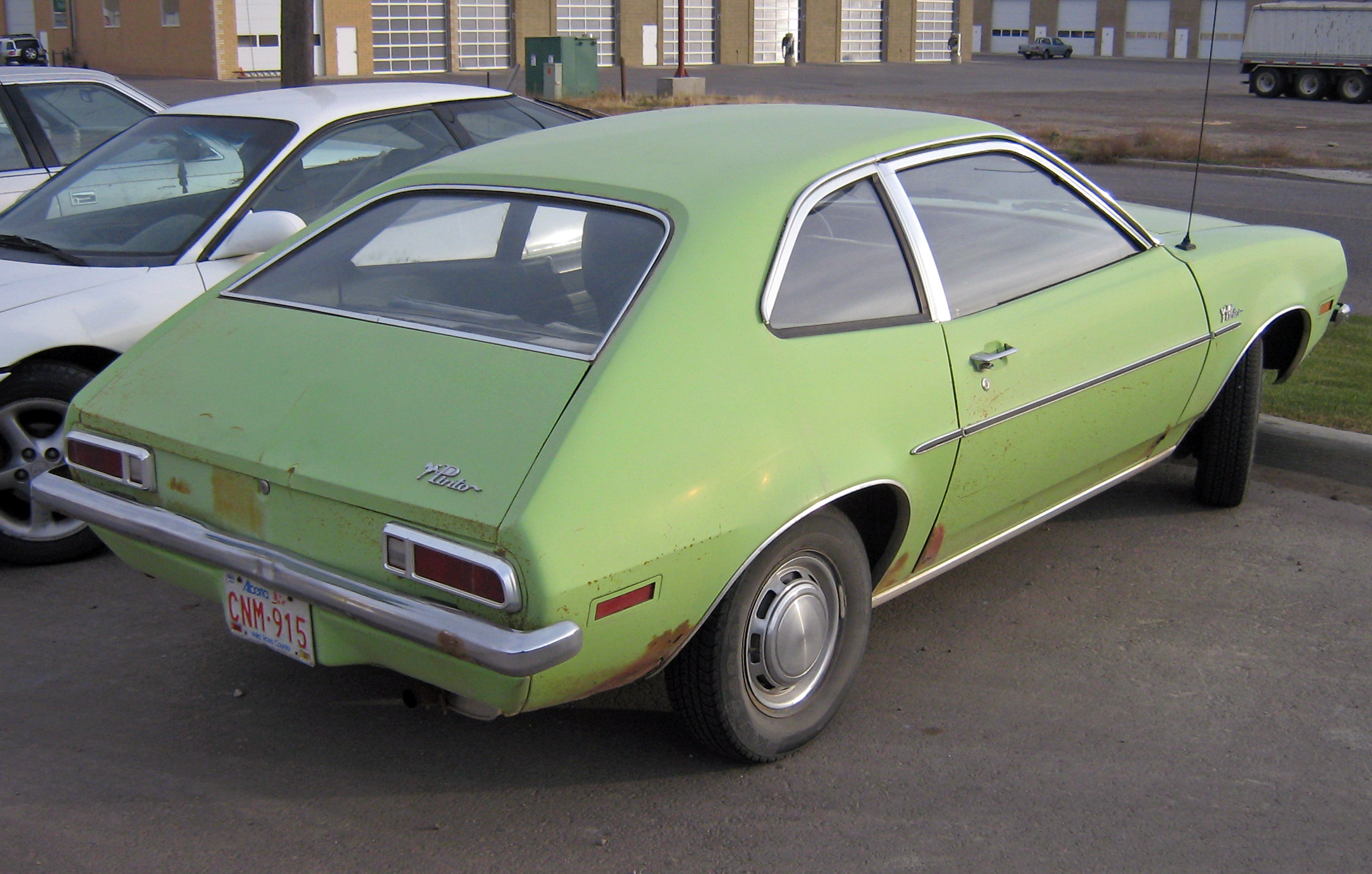
1971–1972 Ford Pinto sedan with enclosed trunk

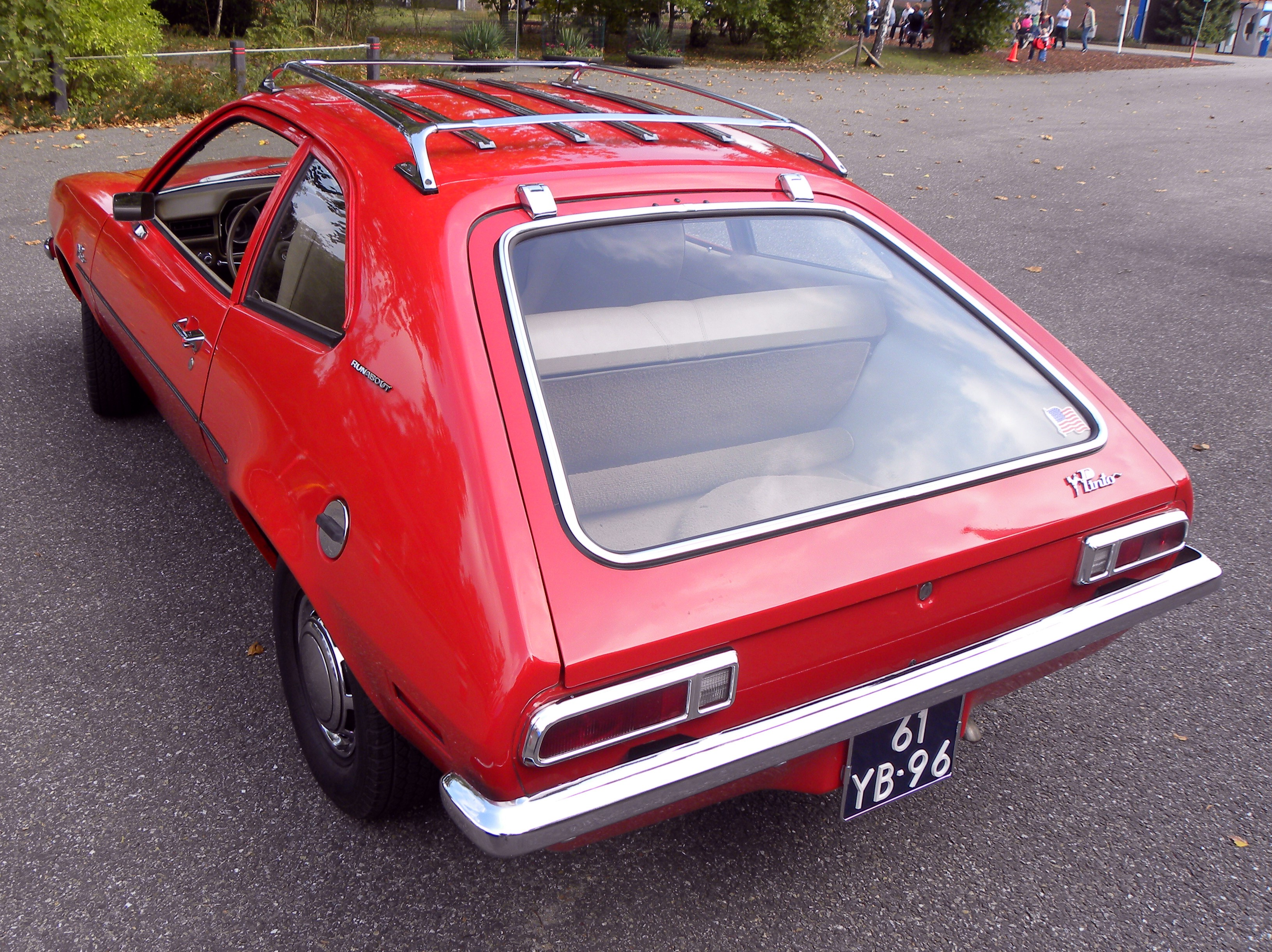
1973 Pinto Runabout with its large hatch and rear window

The Ford Pinto went on sale on September 11, 1970, in one body style, a fastback sedan with an enclosed trunk. A hatchback became available on February 20, 1971, debuting at the Chicago Auto Show. In 1971, the Pinto brochure came with a paper cutout Pinto that one could fold to make a 3D model. Marketed as the Runabout, the hatchback went on sale five days later, priced at $2,062 ($16,393 in 2025 dollars). The hatch itself featured exposed chrome hinges for the liftgate and five decorative chrome strips, sprung scissor struts to assist in opening the hatch, a rear window approximately as large as the sedan's, and a fold-down seat – a feature which concurrently became optional on the sedan. The hatchback model matched the sedan in all other dimensions and offered 38.1 cubic feet (1,080 L) of cargo space with its seat folded. By 1972, Ford redesigned the hatch itself, with the glass portion of the hatch enlarged to almost the entire size of the hatch itself, ultimately to be followed by an optional rear hatch that was entirely glass, for model years1977–1980.

On October 30, 1970, less than two months after introduction, 26,000 Pintos were recalled to address a possible problem with the accelerator sticking on once engaged at more than halfway. On March 29, 1971, Ford recalled all 220,000 Pintos manufactured before March 19, 1971, to address a problem with fuel vapors in the engine air filter possibly igniting by a backfire through the carburetor.

On February 24, 1972, the Pinto station wagon debuted with an overall length of 172.7 in (4,390 mm) and 60.5 cubic feet (1,710 L) of cargo volume. The first 2-door Ford station wagon since the 1965 Falcon, the Pinto wagon was equipped with flip-open rear quarter windows. Along with front disc brakes, the 2.0L engine was standard equipment. A Pinto Squire wagon featured simulated woodgrain trim similar to the full-size Country Squire.

Also in February 1972, the Sprint Decor Group was made available for the Pinto for one model year only. The Sprint Decor Group included white exterior paint with blue accent paint and red pin-striping, a blacked-out grille, color-keyed wheels with bright trim rings and hubcaps, whitewall tires, and color-keyed dual sport mirrors. The interior included red, white, and blue cloth and vinyl bucket seats, full carpeting as well as a deluxe steering wheel. The Sprint Decor Group was offered simultaneously on the Maverick and Mustang.

For the 1973 model year, more appearance options were offered. There was a new Sport Accent Group offered in white exterior paint with a choice of two-tone orange or avocado accent paint, matching vinyl roof, and a deluxe interior with wood-tone trim. There was also a new Luxury Decor Group with bright exterior dress-up mouldings, black bumper rub strips, and a deluxe interior with wood-tone trim. New slotted forged aluminum wheels were offered.

=== 1974–1978 ===
In 1974, to meet federal regulations, 5 mph bumpers were added to both the front and rear. Unlike most 1970s cars, the addition of larger bumpers to the Pinto did not necessitate major changes to the bodywork. While the underpowered Kent engine was dropped, the optional OHC engine was expanded to 2.3 L; in various forms, this engine powered a variety of Ford vehicles for 23 years. In 1974, Mercury began selling a rebadged version of the Pinto called Bobcat as a Canada-only model. 544,209 units sold; 1974 became the most popular model year for the Pinto. Steel-belted tires, an anti-theft alarm system, and metallic glow paint were optional.

In 1975, in a move to better compete with the AMC Gremlin, Ford introduced the 2.8 L V6; while far less powerful than the Gremlin's standard 232 cu in (3.8 L) I6, the V6 gave the Pinto a feature unavailable in the Chevrolet Vega. Sales of the Mercury Bobcat were expanded to Lincoln-Mercury dealers in the United States; it was sold as a hatchback and station wagon.

As a minor styling update for 1976, the Pinto received the egg-crate grille and chrome headlamp bezels recycled from the Canada-only 1974 Mercury Bobcat. For one model year only, two new option packages were offered. One was the sporty new Stallion appearance package with blackout trim and black two-tone accent paint offered in red, yellow, silver, and white body colors. This option package was shared with the Mustang II and Maverick. The other new option package was the Runabout Squire which featured wood-grain vinyl bodysides like the Squire wagon. The interior received the optional Luxury Decor Group which featured new low-back vinyl or plaid cloth bucket seats with matching door trim. A new basic low-cost model was introduced known as the Pinto Pony with less standard equipment and cheaper interior trim. A wagon version of the Pony would later arrive for the 1979 model year.

For the 1977 model year, the Pinto received its first significant styling updates with slanted back urethane headlamp buckets, parking lamps, and grille. The tail lamps were revised except for the wagons. Runabouts offered an optional all-glass rear hatch for the first time. Pinto wagons were given a new option package. Dubbed the Pinto Cruising Wagon, it was the sedan delivery version of the Pinto styled to resemble a small conversion van, complete with round side panel "bubble windows" and a choice of optional vinyl graphics.

Ford offered new sporty appearance packages similar to those found on the Chevrolet Vega and AMC Gremlin but were strictly cosmetic upgrades that added nothing to vehicle performance.

In 1978, the Pinto was no longer the smallest Ford sold in the U.S., as the company introduced the Fiesta. Nearly two feet shorter than the Pinto, the German-designed Fiesta was the first front-wheel-drive car sold by Ford in the United States.

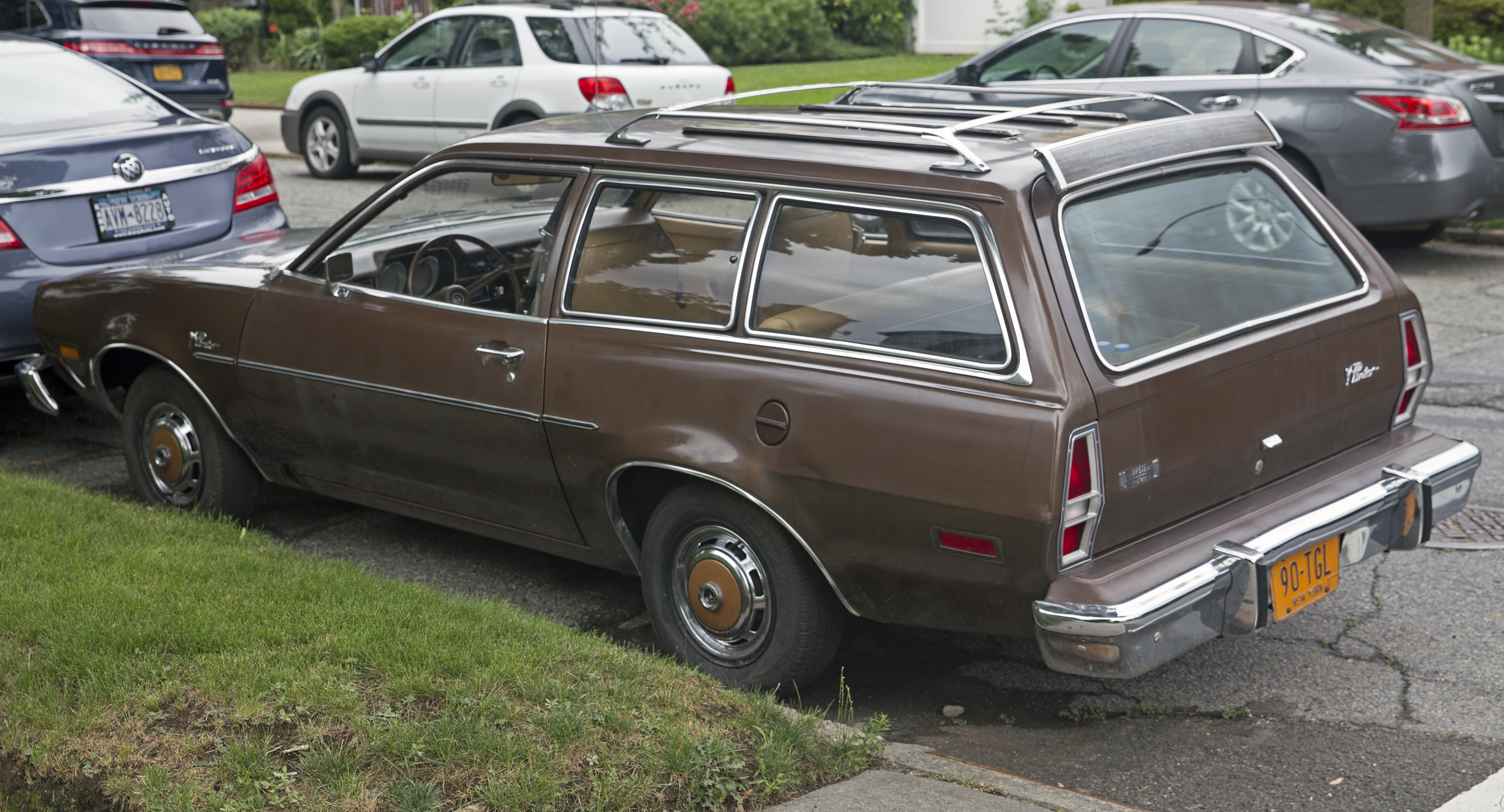
1974 Ford Pinto station wagon

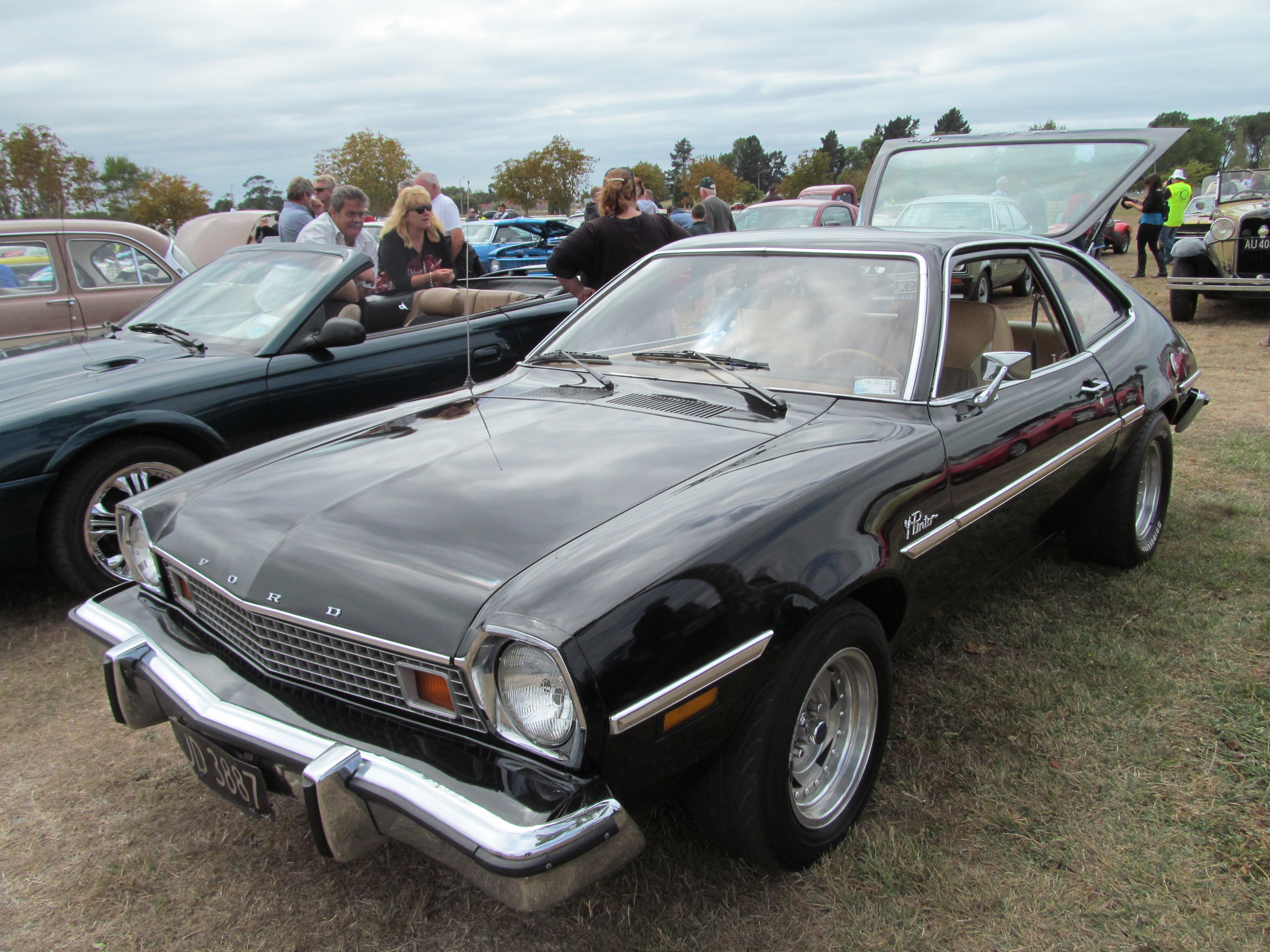
1976 Ford Pinto Runabout

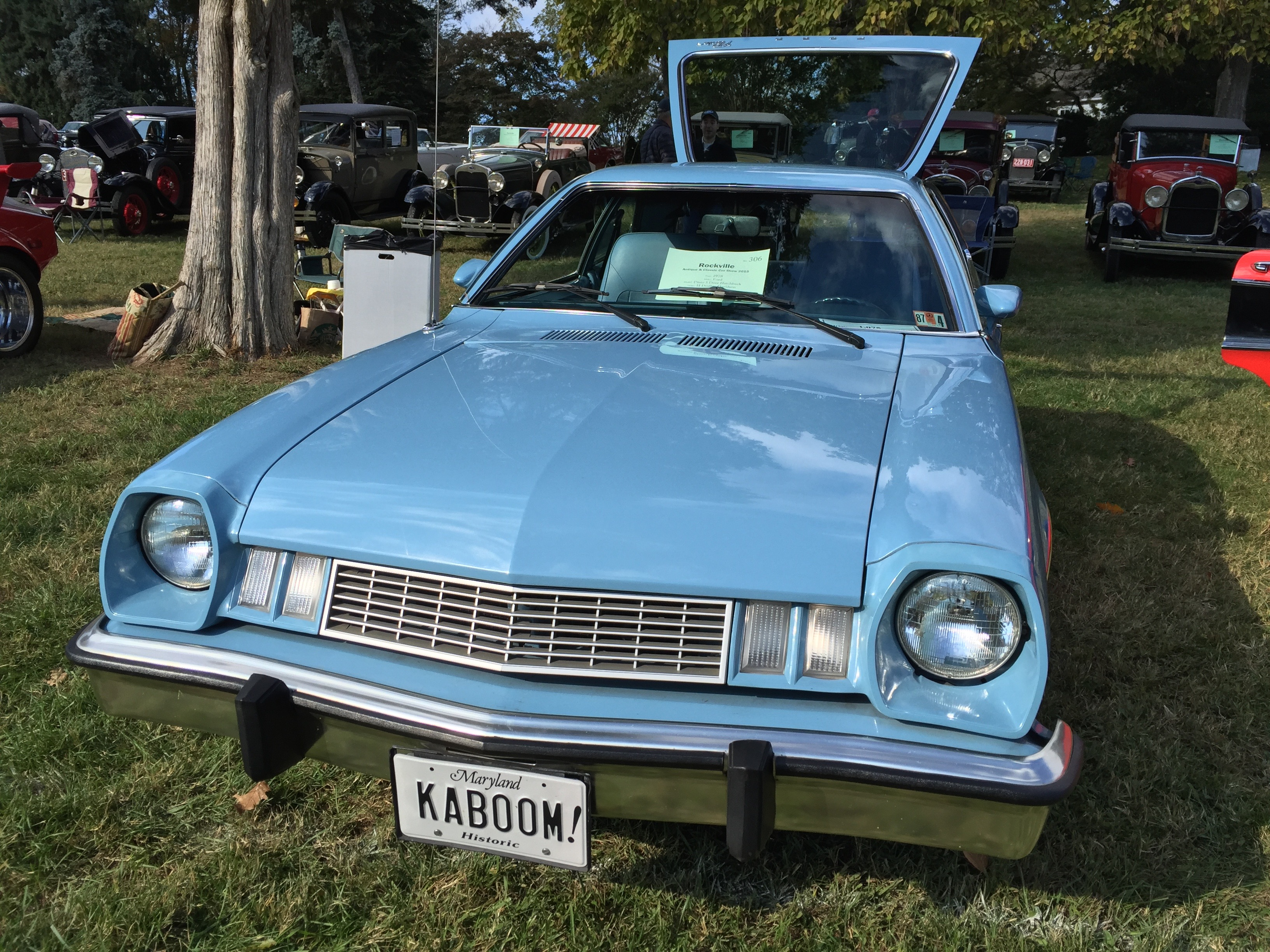
1977–1978 Ford Pinto Runabout

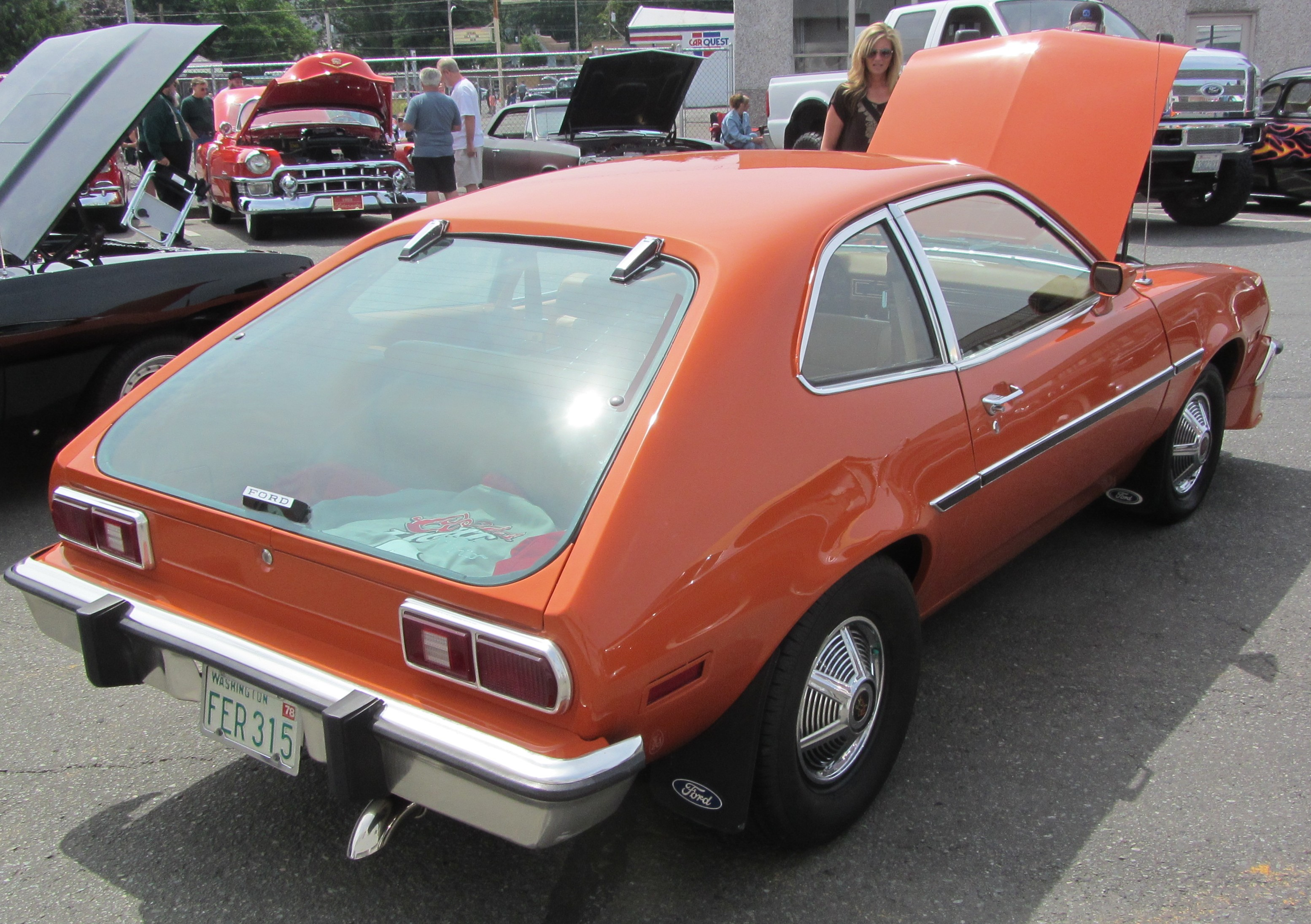
1977–1978 Ford Pinto Runabout with optional all-glass hatch

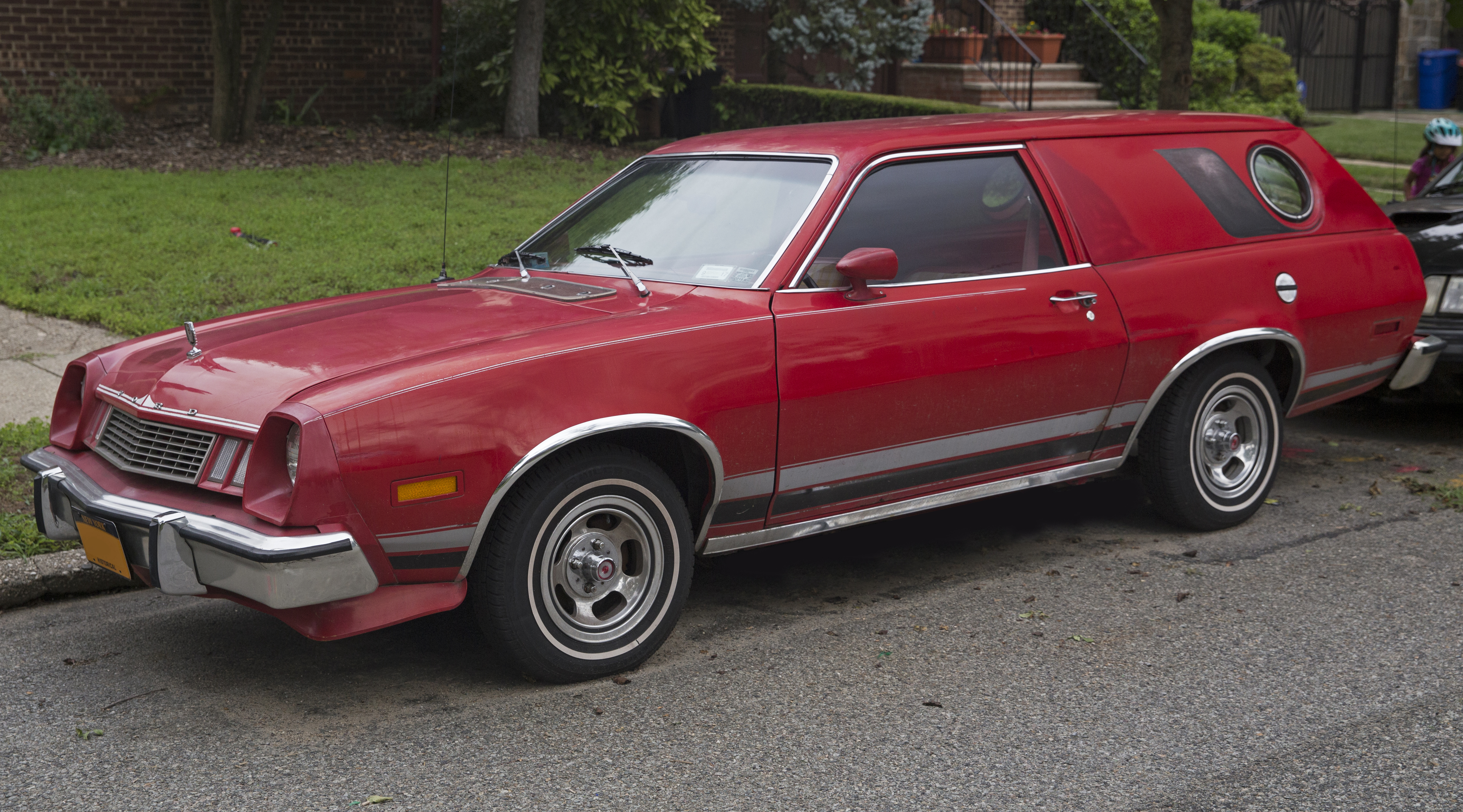
1977–1978 Ford Pinto Cruising Wagon

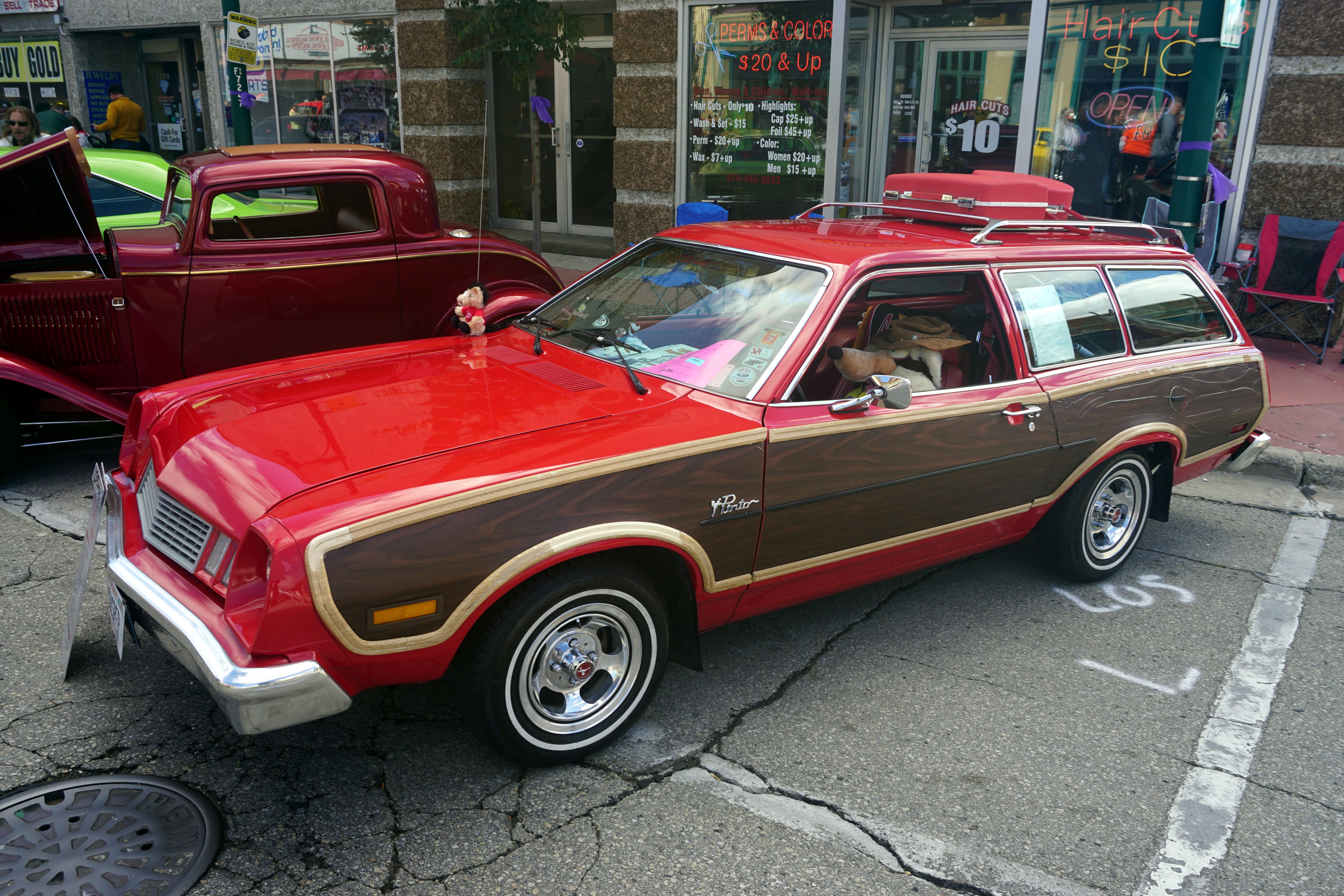
1978 Ford Pinto Squire Wagon

=== 1979–1980 ===
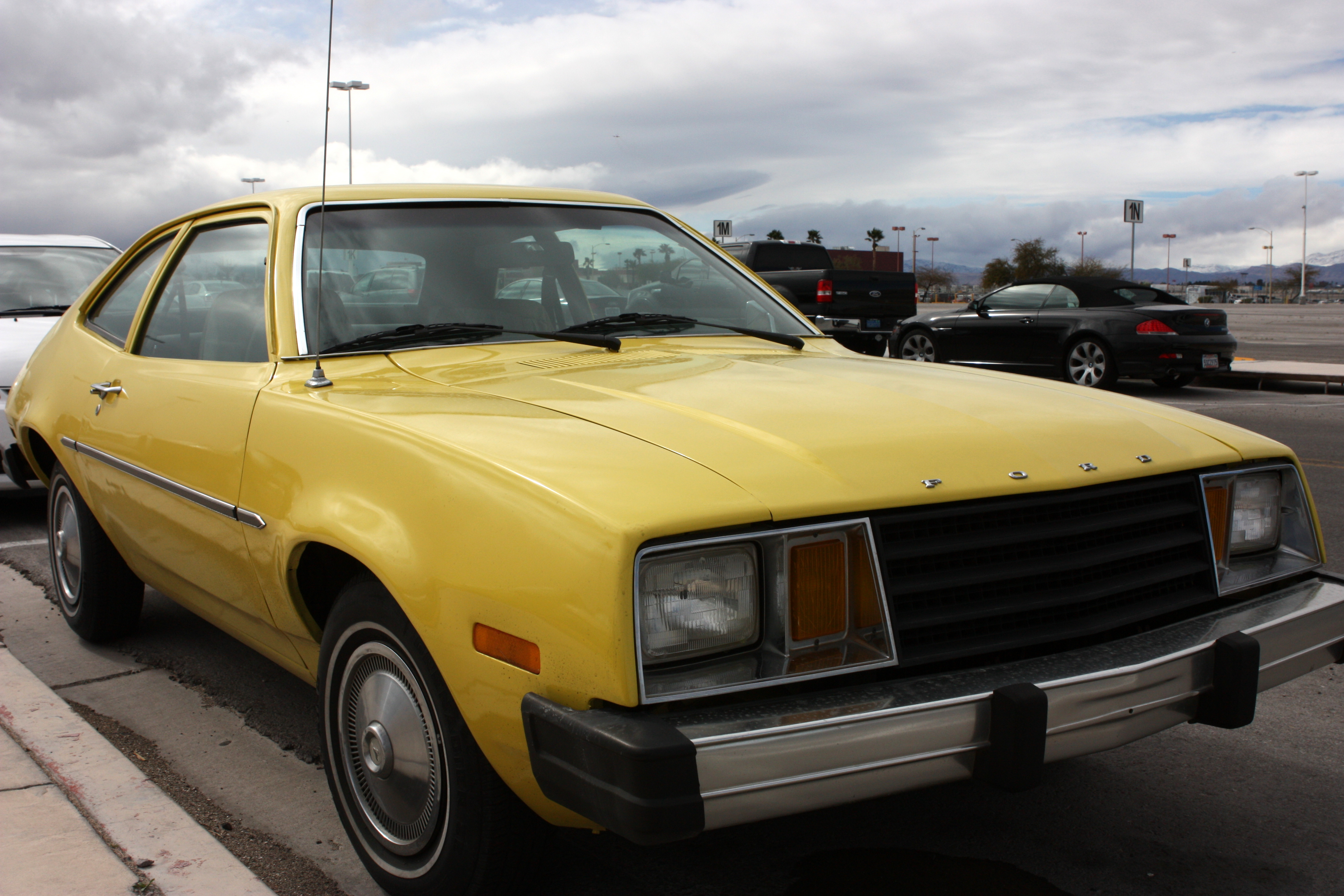
1979–1980 Ford Pinto sedan

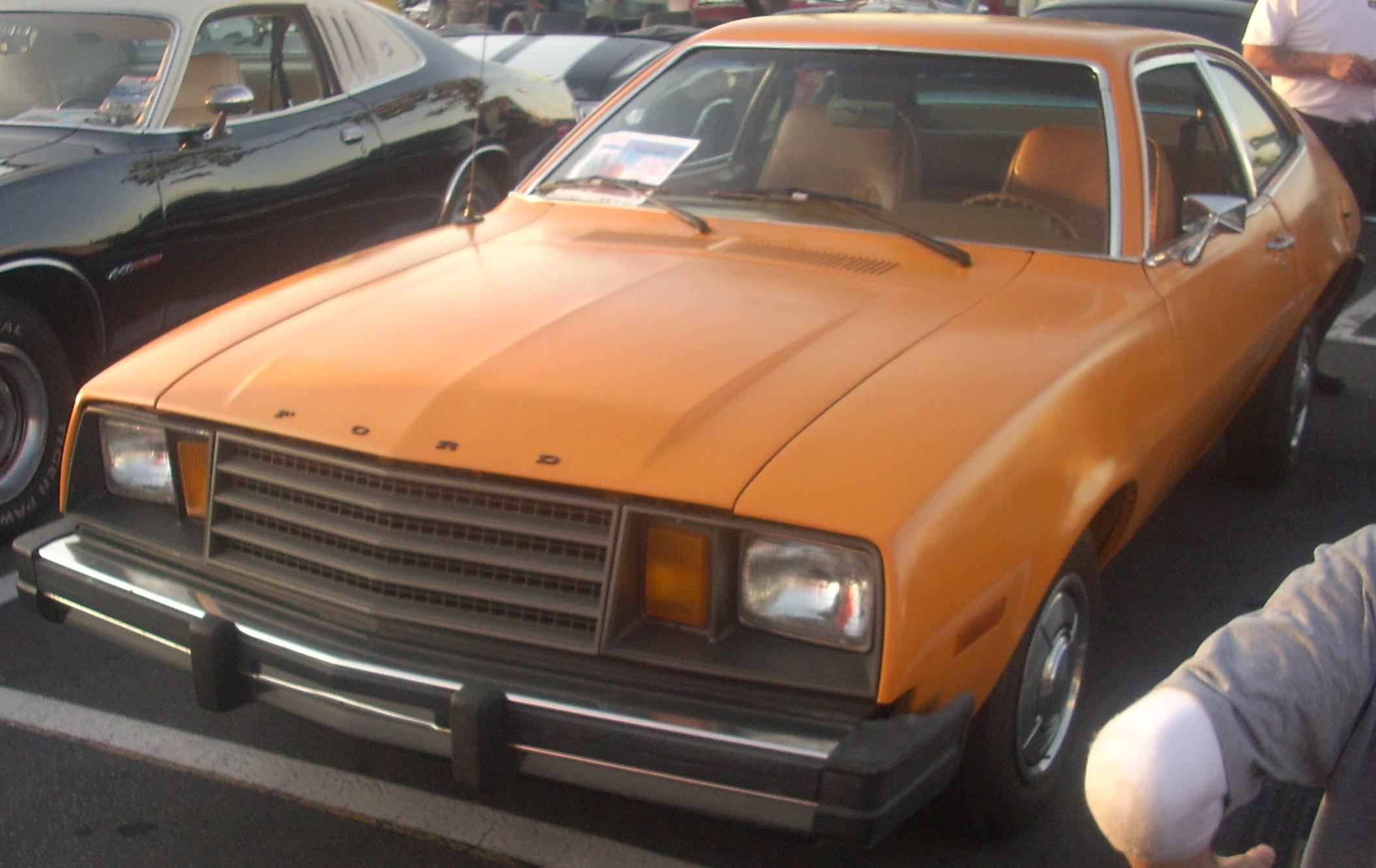
1979–1980 Ford Pinto Runabout

For the 1979 model year, the Pinto featured rectangular headlamps, inboard vertical parking lamps, and a taller slanted back grille. Except for the wagons, the tail lamps were revised. The interior was updated with a new rectangular instrument cluster and a modified dash-pad for vehicles without the optional sports instrumentation. The variety of sports appearance packages was revised, some with new graphics.

The Pinto ESS (European Sports Sedan) trim package became available in 2-door Sedan and 3-door Runabout body styles featuring black roof drip mouldings, lower back panel, rocker panels, glass surrounds and door frame trims (incl. black tape along lower side window ledges), dual sport mirrors, premium body-side mouldings, and hinges for the standard all-glass third door. The grille and headlamp surrounds were charcoal, the fenders had ESS identification and the styled steel wheels had black wheel trim rings. The Sports Package (front stabilizer bar, sport steering wheel, full instrumentation, optional axle ratio on 2.3L manual cars) was standard.

July 1980 marked the end of the Pinto's production run, with a total production run of 3,150,943 cars. Ford's designated replacement for the Pinto was the front-wheel drive Ford Escort. For the 1980 model year, the V6 engine was discontinued, leaving the 2.3 L as the sole engine.

== Powertrain ==
Except for 1980, the Pinto was available with a choice of two engines. For the first five years of production, only four-cylinder inline engines were offered. Ford changed the power ratings almost every year.

Initial Pinto deliveries in the early years used the English 1.6 L (98 cu in) and German 2.0 L (120 cu in) engines tuned for performance (see below). The 2.0 L (120 cu in) engine used a two-barrel carburetor where just one bore was bigger than that used on the Maverick. With the low weight (not much above 2,000 lb (900 kg)) and the SOHC engine it accelerated from 0 to 60 mph (0 to 97 km/h) in 10.8 seconds. With the advent of emission control requirements, Ford moved from European-sourced to domestically sourced engines, using new or modified designs. New safety legislation affected bumpers and other parts, adding to the weight of the car and reduced performance. Revised SAE standards in 1972 dropped the Pinto's 1.6 L (98 cu in) engine to 54 bhp (40 kW) – and the 2.0 L (120 cu in) engine to 86 hp (64 kW).

In 1974, the 2.3 litres (140 cu in) OHC I4 engine was introduced. This engine was updated and modified several times, allowing it to remain in production into 1997. Among other Ford vehicles, a turbocharged version of this engine later powered the performance-based Thunderbird Turbo Coupe, Mustang SVO, and the European-built Merkur XR4Ti. Ford introduced the Cologne-built 2.8 litre V-6 engine as an option in 1975.

Engine name	Years available	Displacement	Power	Torque
Inline-four engine
Ford Kent I4	1971–1973	98 cu in (1.6 L)	75 hp (56 kW; 76 PS) (1971); 54 hp (40 kW; 55 PS) (1972–1973)	96 lb⋅ft (130 N⋅m) (1971)
Ford EAO I4	1971–1974	122 cu in (2.0 L)	100 hp (75 kW; 101 PS) (1971); 86 hp (64 kW; 87 PS) (1972–1974)	
Ford LL23 I4	1974–1980	140 cu in (2.3 L)	90 hp (67 kW; 91 PS) (1974); 83 hp (62 kW; 84 PS) (1975); 92 hp (69 kW; 93 PS) (1976); 89 hp (66 kW; 90 PS) (1977); 88 hp (66 kW; 89 PS) (1978–1980)	110 lb⋅ft (150 N⋅m) (1975); 121 lb⋅ft (164 N⋅m) (1976); 120 lb⋅ft (160 N⋅m) (1977); 118 lb⋅ft (160 N⋅m) (1978–1979); 119 lb⋅ft (161 N⋅m) (1980)
V6 engine
Ford Cologne V6	1975–1979	170 cu in (2.8 L)	97 hp (72 kW; 98 PS) (1975); 103 hp (77 kW; 104 PS) (1976); 93 hp (69 kW; 94 PS) (1977); 90 hp (67 kW; 91 PS) (1978); 102 hp (76 kW; 103 PS) (1979)	139 lb⋅ft (188 N⋅m) (1975); 149 lb⋅ft (202 N⋅m) (1976); 140 lb⋅ft (190 N⋅m) (1977); 143 lb⋅ft (194 N⋅m) (1978); 138 lb⋅ft (187 N⋅m) (1979)
†Horsepower and torque ratings are net output after the 1971 model year.

== Mercury Bobcat (1974–1980) ==
Lincoln-Mercury dealers introduced a rebadged variant of the Pinto as the Mercury Bobcat, for model year 1974, beginning with the Canadian market. Offered in the same body styles as the Pinto, the Bobcat was distinguished by an egg-crate grille and chrome headlamp bezels. The rear featured modified double-width tail lamps for the sedan and Runabout models.

For 1975, the Bobcat was added to the U.S. market and sold initially in upgraded levels of trim as the Runabout hatchback and Villager wagon. Lesser-trimmed versions were offered in subsequent model years. The Bobcat was never offered as a two-door sedan with an enclosed trunk for the U.S. market. The Bobcat was offered as a two-door sedan for a limited number of years in Canada. All Bobcats were restyled with a raised hood and a taller vertical bar grille. Across all model years, Bobcats offered various appearance options, similar to the Pinto's.

For 1979, the Bobcat received a major restyling shared with the Pinto featuring a slanted back front end with rectangular headlamps and inboard vertical parking lamps but distinguished with a large vertical bar grille. Except for the wagons, the tail lamps were revised. The base instrument cluster received a new rectangular design with a modified dash pad.

Production of the Bobcat ended in 1980, superseded by the Mercury Lynx. In total, 224,026 Bobcats were manufactured from 1975 until 1980.

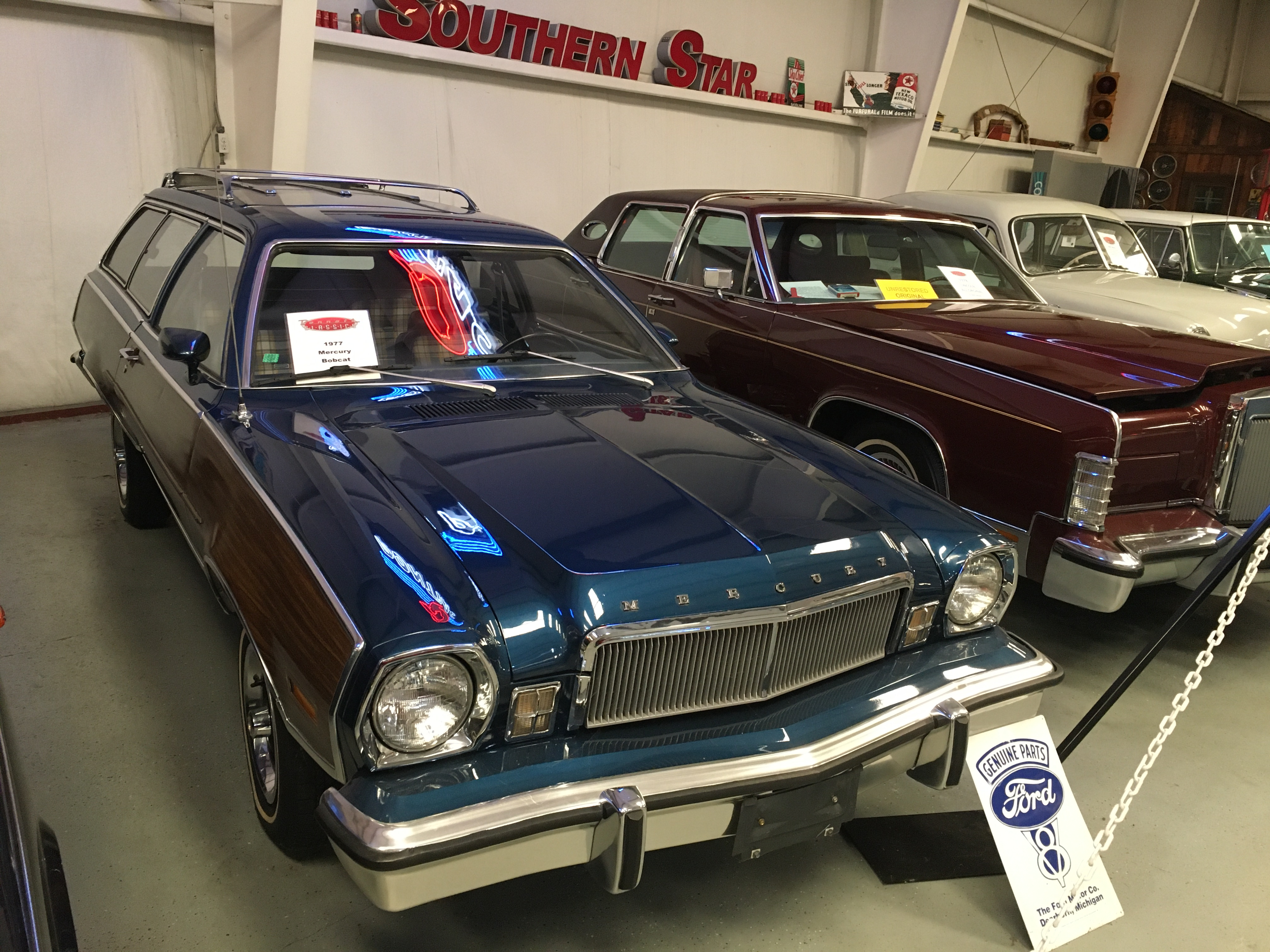
1977 Mercury Bobcat wagon

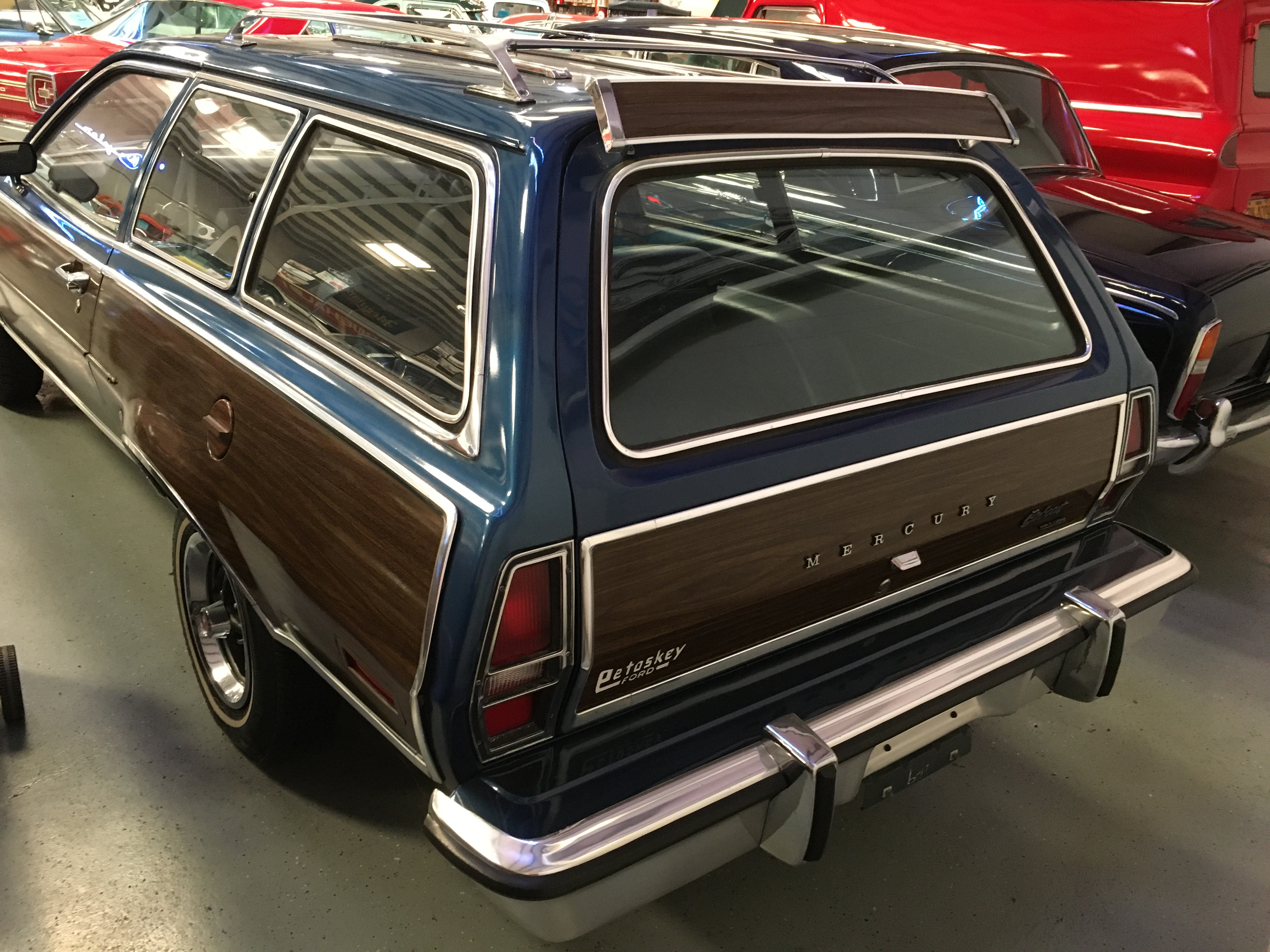
1977 Mercury Bobcat Villager wagon

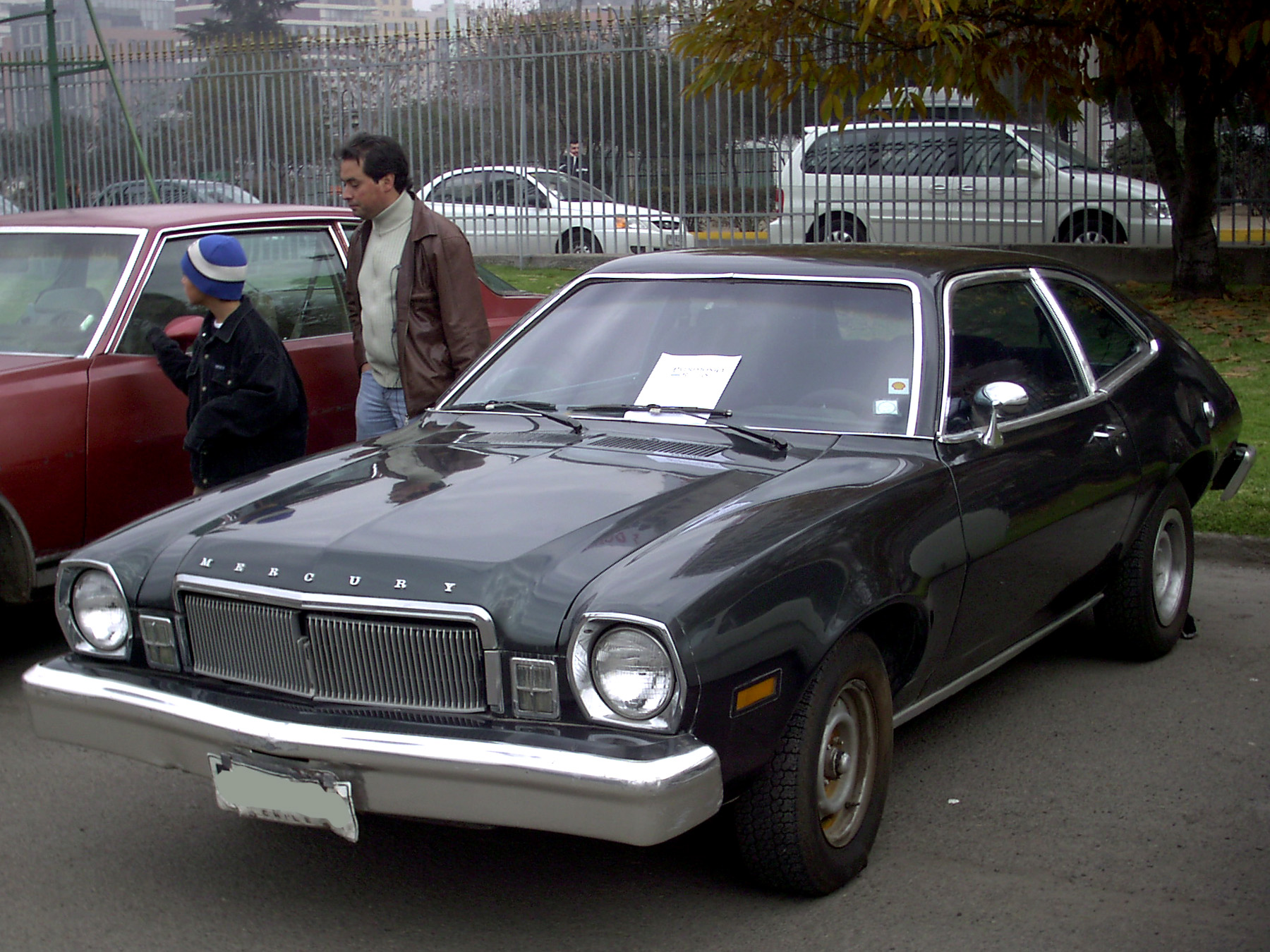
1975–1978 Mercury Bobcat Runabout

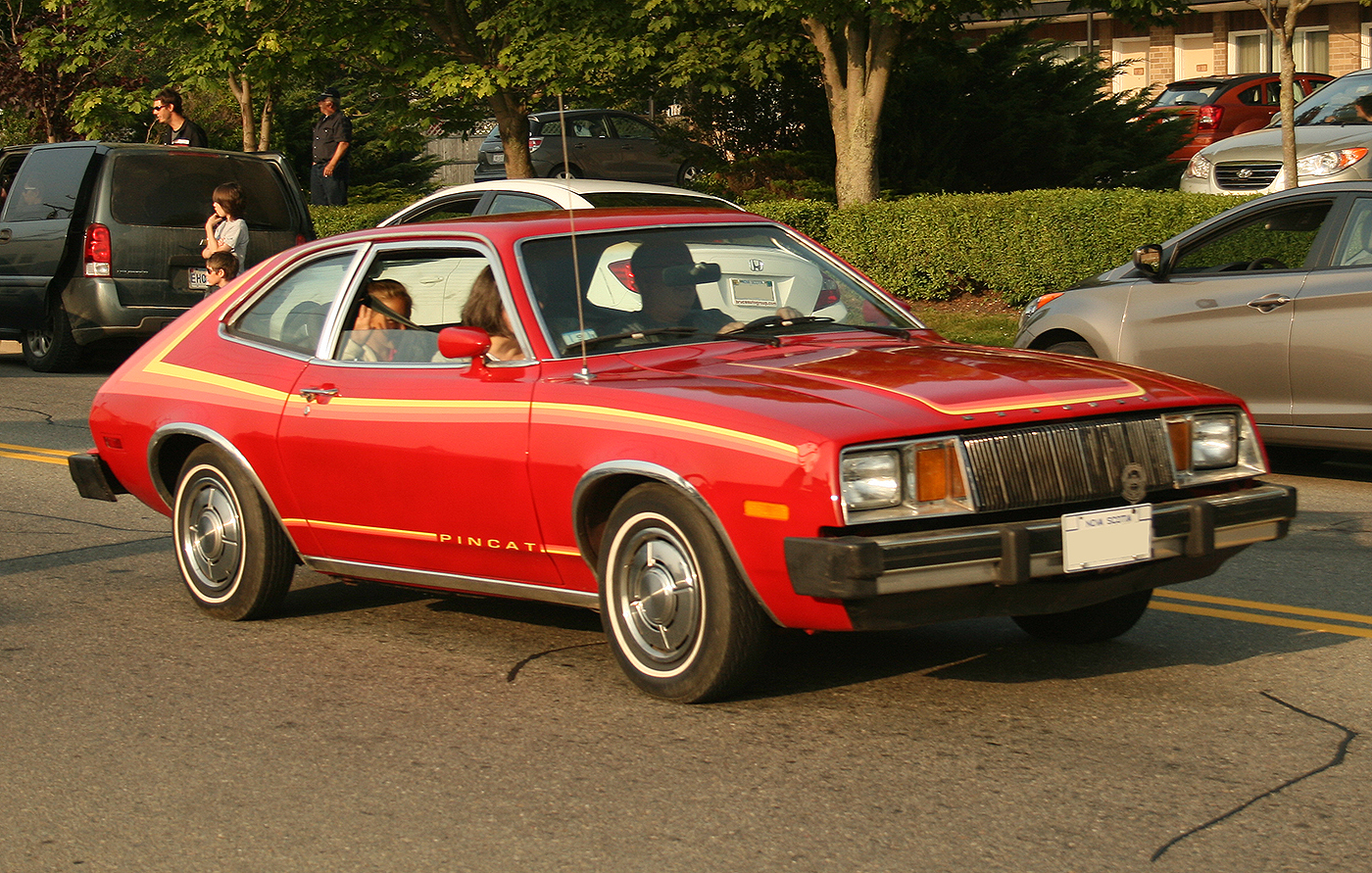
1979–1980 Mercury Bobcat Runabout

== Reception and criticism ==
Upon release, the Pinto was received with both positive and negative reviews. Consumer Reports listed the Pinto as one of the "runners up" in a test of six subcompact cars—better in overall quality than the AMC Gremlin and about on a par with the Volkswagen Beetle, but inferior to the "three winners" — Datsun 510, Toyota Corona and Chevrolet Vega. Road & Track faulted the suspension and standard drum brakes, calling the latter a "serious deficiency", but praised the proven 1.6 L Kent engine, adapted from European Fords. Super Stock Magazine found the fit and finish to be "superior" and were impressed with the car overall. Car and Driver found the Pinto, when equipped with the larger 2.0L engine and front disc brakes, to be a nimble and powerful commuter car with good visibility and sports-car feel. A review of the 1974 Pinto with an automatic transmission by Car and Driver was not as favorable noting significant decreases in mileage and acceleration.

The later controversy surrounding the Pinto resulted in a negative legacy associated with the car and Ford's handling of the controversies. In 2004, Forbes included the Pinto among its fourteen Worst Cars of All Time, noting that its problems helped create an opening in the US market for small cars from Japan. Time magazine included the Pinto on lists of The Fifty Worst Cars of All Time. Time, Popular Mechanics, and NBC News have included the car in lists of most significant recalls. The controversy also resulted in movies referencing the vehicle.

== Fuel system fires, recalls, and litigation ==
The safety of the design of the Pinto's fuel system led to critical incidents and subsequently resulted in a recall, lawsuits, criminal prosecution, and public controversy. The events surrounding the controversy have been described as a "landmark narrative". The Ford Pinto has been cited and debated in numerous business ethics as well as tort reform case studies.

The placement of the car's fuel tank was the result of both conservative industry practice of the time as well as the uncertain regulatory environment during the development and early sales periods of the car. Ford was accused of knowing the car had an unsafe tank placement and then forgoing design changes based on an internal cost-benefit analysis. Two landmark legal cases, Grimshaw v. Ford Motor Co. and Indiana v. Ford Motor Co., resulted from fatal accidents involving Pintos.

Scholarly work published in the decades after the Pinto's release has examined the cases and offered summations of the general understanding of the Pinto and the controversy regarding the car's safety performance and risk of fire. These works reviewed misunderstandings related to the actual number of fire-related deaths related to the fuel system design, "wild and unsupported claims asserted in Pinto Madness and elsewhere", the facts of the related legal cases, Grimshaw vs Ford Motor Company and State of Indiana vs Ford Motor Company, the applicable safety standards at the time of design, and the nature of the NHTSA investigations and subsequent vehicle recalls. One described the Grimshaw case as "mythical" due to several significant factual misconceptions and their effect on the public's understanding.

=== Fuel system design ===
The design of the Pinto fuel system was complicated by the uncertain regulatory environment during the development period. The first federal standard for automotive fuel system safety, passed in 1967, known as Section 301 in the Federal Motor Vehicle Safety Standards, initially only considered front impacts. In January 1969, 18 months into the Pinto's development cycle, the NHTSA proposed expanding the standard to cover rear-end collisions. The proposed standard was based on a 20 mph (32 km/h) moving-barrier rear impact test. Ford publicly announced it supported the standard. In August 1970, the month the Pinto went into production, the NHTSA changed the proposal to a more stringent 20 mph (32 km/h) fixed-barrier standard which car companies were to meet in 18 months. The fixed-barrier standard was seen by the auto industry as a significant increase in test severity. At the same time, the NHTSA announced a long-term goal of setting a 30 mph (48 km/h) fixed-barrier standard. Due to the confusion related to the various proposed standards and an expectation that the NHTSA would not select the more stringent 30 mph (48 km/h) fixed-barrier standard, Ford elected to voluntarily meet the 20 mph (32 km/h) moving-barrier standard for all cars by 1973. Ford and other automobile manufacturers objected to the more stringent fuel system safety standard and filed objections during the required comment periods of the proposed regulations.

The Pinto's design positioned its fuel tank between the solid live rear axle and the rear bumper, a standard practice in US subcompact cars at the time. The Pinto's vulnerability to fuel leakage and fire in a rear-end collision was exacerbated by reduced rear "crush space", a lack of structural reinforcement in the rear, and an "essentially ornamental" rear bumper (though similar to other manufacturers).

As part of a response to the NHTSA's proposed regulations, crash testing conducted in 1970 with modified Ford Mavericks demonstrated vulnerability at fairly low crash speeds. Design changes were made, but post-launch tests showed similar results. These tests were conducted to develop crash testing standards rather than specifically investigating fuel system integrity. Though Ford engineers were not pleased with the car's performance, no reports of the time indicate particular concern. The Pinto was tested by rival American Motors (AMC) where in addition to crash-testing, engineers specialized in fuel-system performance because of the potential deadly fires in severe collisions.

Ford also tested several different vehicle modifications that could improve rear impact performance. However, the engineer's occupational caution and aversion to "unproven" solutions, as well as a view that the crash test results were inconclusive, resulted in the use of a conventional fuel tank design and placement. The use of an above-the-axle tank location was considered safer by some, but not all, at Ford. This placement was not a viable option for the hatchback and station wagon body styles.

Beginning in 1973, field reports of Ford Pintos consumed by fire after low-speed rear-end collisions were received by Ford's recall coordinator office. Based on standard procedures used to evaluate field reports, Ford's internal recall evaluation group twice reviewed the field data and found no actionable issue.

=== Cost–benefit analysis, the Pinto Memo ===
In 1973, Ford's Environmental and Safety Engineering division developed a cost–benefit analysis entitled Fatalities Associated with Crash Induced Fuel Leakage and Fires for submission to the NHTSA in support of Ford's objection to proposed stronger fuel system regulation. The document has become known as the Grush/Saunby Report, named for its authors, and as the "Pinto Memo". Cost-benefit analysis was one tool used in the evaluation of safety design decisions accepted by the industry and the NHTSA. The Grush/Saunby Report compared the cost to all automakers to install hardware meant to limit fuel leakage in vehicle rollovers to the societal costs for injuries and deaths related to fires in cases of vehicle rollovers for all cars sold in the US. The values assigned to serious burn injuries and loss of life were based on values calculated by NHTSA in 1972. In the memo Ford estimated the cost of fuel system modifications to reduce fire risks in rollover events to be $11 per car across 12.5 million cars and light trucks (all manufacturers), for a total of $137 million. The design changes were estimated to save 180 burn deaths and 180 serious injuries per year, a benefit to society of $49.5 million.

In August 1977, having been provided with a copy of the memo by Grimshaw v. Ford Motor Co. plaintiffs before trial, Mark Dowie's investigative article "Pinto Madness", published in Mother Jones magazine, emphasized the emotional aspects of the Grush/Saunby Report and implied Ford was callously trading lives for profits. The Mother Jones article also erroneously claimed that somewhere between 500 and 900 persons had been killed in fires attributed to the Pinto's unique design features.

The public understanding of the cost-benefit analysis has contributed to the mythology of the Ford Pinto case. Time magazine said the memo was one of the automotive industry's "most notorious paper trails". A common misconception is that the document considered Ford's tort liability costs rather than the generalized cost to society and applied to the annual sales of all passenger cars, not just Ford vehicles. The general misunderstanding of the document, as presented by Mother Jones, gave it an operational significance it never had.

=== NHTSA investigation ===
In April 1974, the Center for Auto Safety petitioned the National Highway Traffic Safety Administration (NHTSA) to recall Ford Pintos to address fuel system design defects after reports from attorneys of three deaths and four serious injuries in rear-end collisions at moderate speeds. The NHTSA found there was not enough evidence to warrant a defect investigation. In August 1977, Dowie's "Pinto Madness" article was published, leveling a series of accusations against Ford, the Pinto and the NHTSA. These included that Ford knew the Pinto was a "firetrap" and said that Ford did not implement design changes because the company's cost-benefit analysis document showed that paying out millions in damages in lawsuits was less expensive than the design changes. The day after the article's release consumer advocate Ralph Nader and the author of the Mother Jones article held a news conference in Washington DC on the alleged dangers of the Pinto's design. On the same day, Nader and the Center for Auto Safety re-submitted their petition to the NHTSA.

Former UCLA law professor Gary T. Schwartz in a Rutgers Law Review article said the NHTSA investigation of the Pinto was in response to consumer complaints and noted the Mother Jones article included a clip out "coupon" that readers could mail to the NHTSA. Lee and Ermann note that the Mother Jones labeling of the Pinto as a "firetrap" and accusations that the NHTSA was buckling to industry pressure as well as the public interest created by sensationalized news stories "forced a second Pinto investigation and guaranteed that the NHTSA would be under the microscope for its duration."

On August 11, 1977, the day after the Nader and Mother Jones press conference, the NHTSA initiated an investigation. On May 8, 1978, the NHTSA informed Ford of their determination that the Pinto fuel system was defective. The NHTSA concluded:

1971–1976 Ford Pintos have experienced moderate speed, rear-end collisions that have resulted in fuel tank damage, fuel leakage, and fire occurrences that have resulted in fatalities and non-fatal burn injuries ... The fuel tank design and structural characteristics of the 1975–1976 Mercury Bobcat which render it identical to contemporary Pinto vehicles, also render it subject to like consequences in rear-impact collisions.

NHTSA scheduled a public hearing for June 1978, and NHTSA negotiated with Ford on the recall.

Lee and Ermann noted that NHTSA used a worst-case test to justify the recall of the Pinto, rather than the regular 1977 rear-impact crash test. A large and heavy car was used instead of a standard moving barrier. Weights were placed in the nose of the car to help it slide under the Pinto and maximize gas tank contact. The vehicle headlights were turned on to provide a possible ignition source. The fuel tank was completely filled with gasoline rather than partially filled with non-flammable Stoddard fluid as was the normal test procedure. In a later interview, the NHTSA engineer was asked why the NHTSA forced a Pinto recall for failing a 35 mph test given that most small cars of the time would not have passed. "Just because your friends get away with shoplifting, doesn't mean you should get away with it too."

The National Highway Traffic Safety Administration (NHTSA) ultimately directed Ford to recall the Pinto. Initially, the NHTSA did not feel there was sufficient evidence to demand a recall due to incidents of fire. The NHTSA investigation found that 27 deaths were found to have occurred between 1970 and mid-1977 in rear-impact crashes that resulted in a fire. The NHTSA did not indicate if these impacts would have been survivable absent fire or if the impacts were more severe than even a state-of-the-art (for 1977) fuel system could have withstood. In their analysis of the social factors affecting the NHTSA's actions, Lee and Ermann note that 27 is the same number of deaths attributed to a Pinto transmission problem which contributed to collisions after the affected cars stalled. They also note that the NHTSA had two primary incentives in proving a defect existed in the Pinto's fuel system design. The administration was pressured by safety advocates (Center for Auto Safety) as well as the public response. It was also being forced into action due to how both the courts and executive branch were limiting the ability of the NHTSA to address systematic auto safety issues.

=== Recall ===
Though Ford could have proceeded with the formal recall hearing, fearing additional damage to the company's public reputation, the company agreed to a "voluntary recall" program. On June 9, 1978, days before the NHTSA was to issue Ford a formal recall order, Ford recalled 1.5 million Ford Pintos and Mercury Bobcats, the largest recall in automotive history at the time. The recall included sedans and hatchbacks, but not the station wagon. Ford disagreed with the NHTSA finding of a defect, and said the recall was to "end public concern that has resulted from criticism of the fuel systems in these vehicles." The Ford recall placed a polyethylene shield between the tank and likely causes of puncture, lengthened the filler tube, and improved the tank filler seal in the event of a collision.

=== Legal cases ===
Approximately 117 lawsuits were brought against Ford in connection with rear-end accidents in the Pinto. The two most significant cases were Grimshaw v. Ford Motor Company and State of Indiana v. Ford Motor Company.

==== Grimshaw v. Ford Motor Co. ====
Grimshaw v. Ford Motor Co., decided in February 1978, is one of two important Pinto cases. A 1972 Pinto driven by Lily Gray stalled in the center lane of a California freeway. The car was struck from behind by a vehicle initially traveling at 50 mph (80 km/h) and impacted at an estimated between 30 and 50 mph (48 and 80 km/h), resulting in a fuel tank fire. Gray died at the time of the impact. Richard Grimshaw, the thirteen-year-old passenger, was seriously burned. The plaintiff's bar collaborated with Mother Jones and The Center for Auto Safety to publicize damning information about Ford prior to trial. The jury awarded $127.8 million in total damages; $125 million in punitive damages and $2,841,000 in compensatory damages to passenger Richard Grimshaw and $665,000 in compensatory damages to the family of the deceased driver, Lily Gray. The jury award was said to be the largest ever in US product liability and personal injury cases. The jury award was the largest against an automaker at the time. The judge reduced the jury's punitive damages award to $3.5 million, which he later said was "still larger than any other punitive damage award in the state by a factor of about five." Ford subsequently decided to settle related cases out of court.

Reaction to the Grimshaw case was mixed. According to the Los Angeles Times in 2010, the award "signaled to the auto industry that it would be harshly sanctioned for ignoring known defects." The case has been held up as an example of the disconnection between the use of corporate risk analysis and the tendency of juries to be offended by such analyses. The case is also cited as an example of irrational punitive damage awards. While supporting the finding of liability, Schwartz notes that the punitive damage award is hard to justify.

==== Indiana v. Ford Motor Co. ====
On August 10, 1978, three teenage girls of the Ulrich family of Osceola, Indiana, were killed when the 1973 Pinto they were in, was involved in a rear-end collision. The driver had stopped in the road to retrieve the car's gas cap which had been inadvertently left on the top of the car and subsequently fell onto the road. While stopped the Pinto was struck by a Chevrolet van. Ford sent the Ulrichs a recall notice for the Pinto in 1979. A grand jury indicted Ford on three counts of reckless homicide. Indiana v. Ford was a landmark in product liability law as the first time a corporation faced criminal charges for a defective product, and the first time a corporation was charged with homicide. If convicted, Ford faced a maximum fine of $30,000 under Indiana's 1978 reckless homicide statute. Ford's legal defense was vastly more ambitious than the effort mounted in the Grimshaw case. The effort was led by James F. Neal with a staff of 80 and a budget of about $1 million; the Elkhart County Prosecuting Attorney had a budget of about $20,000 and volunteer law professors and law students. A former head of the NHTSA, testifying on Ford's behalf, said the Pinto's design was no more or less safe than that of any other car in its class. Further, one of the defense's key witnesses, John E. Habberstad, a Spokane-based accident reconstructionist, showed films of test crashes which revealed that, when hit by 1972-model Chevrolet vans, many other cars had similar damage to that which befell the Ford Pinto in which the three girls perished. Involved in the tests, in addition to the Pinto, were a Chevrolet Vega and Impala, American Motors Gremlin, Dodge Colt, and Toyota Corolla. In 1980 Ford was found not guilty. In the same year a civil suit was settled for $7,500 to each plaintiff.

According to Automotive News in 2003, the indictment was a low point in Ford's reputation. Some saw the suit as a landmark for taking a corporation to task for their actions while others saw the case as frivolous. In 2002, Malcolm Wheeler, a lawyer working with the Ford defense team, noted that the case was a poor application of criminal law. The case also impacted how Ford handled future product liability cases both legally and in the press.

=== Retrospective safety analysis ===
A Rutgers Law Review article by former UCLA law professor Gary T. Schwartz (see Section 7.3 NHTSA Investigation above), examined the fatality rates of the Pinto and several other small cars of the time. He noted that fires, and rear-end fires, in particular, are a very small portion of overall auto fatalities. At the time only 1% of automobile crashes would result in fire and only 4% of fatal accidents involved fire, and only 15% of fatal fire crashes are the result of rear-end collisions. When considering the overall safety of the Pinto, subcompact cars as a class had a generally higher fatality risk. Pintos represented 1.9% of all cars on the road in the 1975–76 period. During that time, the car represented 1.9% of all "fatal accidents accompanied by some fire". This implies the Pinto was average for all cars and slightly above average for its class. When all types of fatalities are considered, the Pinto was approximately even with the AMC Gremlin, Chevrolet Vega, and Datsun 510. It was significantly better than the Datsun 1200/210, Toyota Corolla, and VW Beetle. The safety record of the car in terms of fire was average or slightly below average for compacts, and all cars respectively. This was considered respectable for a subcompact car. Only when considering the narrow subset of a rear impact, fire fatalities for the car were somewhat worse than the average for subcompact cars. While acknowledging this is an important legal point, Schwartz rejected the portrayal of the car as a firetrap.

== See also ==
- 60 Minutes: "Unintended acceleration"
- AVE Mizar – a flying Pinto
- Dateline NBC: "General Motors v. NBC"
- Pangra – a kit car based on the Pinto

== Bibliography ==
- "Recall to Affect 165,000 U.S. Pinto Owners". Reading Eagle. Associated Press. March 30, 1971.
- Becker, Paul J.; Jipson, Arthur J.; Bruce, Alan S. (March 2002). "State of Indiana V. Ford Motor Company Revisited". American Journal of Criminal Justice. 26 (2): 181–202. doi:10.1007/bf02887826. S2CID 144364586.
- "Ford Pinto Fuel Tank". Center for Auto Safety. November 13, 2009.
- Danley, John R. (April 2005). "Polishing up the Pinto: Legal Liability, Moral Blame, and Risk". Business Ethics Quarterly. 15 (2): 205–236. doi:10.5840/beq200515211. S2CID 145219885.
- Dardis, Rachel; Zent, Claudia (December 1, 1982). "The Economics of the Pinto Recall". Journal of Consumer Affairs. 16 (2): 261–277. doi:10.1111/j.1745-6606.1982.tb00175.x.
- Dowie, Mark (September 1977). "Pinto Madness". Mother Jones.
- Engstrom, Nora Freeman (2018). "When Cars Crash: The Automobile's Tort Law Legacy" (PDF). Wake Forest Law Review: 293+. Archived from the original (PDF) on January 27, 2021.
- Epstein, Richard A (April 1980). "Is Pinto a Criminal?" (PDF). AEI Journal on Government and Society.
- Gladwell, Malcolm (May 4, 2015). "The Engineer's Lament". The New Yorker.
- Gioia, Dennis A. (May 1992). "Pinto fires and personal ethics: A script analysis of missed opportunities". Journal of Business Ethics. 11 (5–6): 379–389. doi:10.1007/BF00870550. S2CID 189918233.
- Grimshaw v. Ford Motor Co., 119 CA3d 757 (California courts of appeal 1981).
- Jones, William H. (June 10, 1978). "Ford Recalls 1.5 Million Small Cars. Ford Recalls 1.5 Million Pintos, Bobcats, Pintos, Bolcats Face Alteration To Cut Fire Risk". The Washington Post.
- Lee, Matthew T; Ermann, M. David (February 1999). "Pinto "Madness" as a Flawed Landmark Narrative: An Organizational and Network Analysis". Social Problems. 46 (1): 30–47. doi:10.1525/sp.1999.46.1.03x0240f.
- Lewis, David L (2003). 100 Years of Ford. Lincolnwood, IL: Publications International. ISBN 0-7853-7988-6.
- Rossow, Mark (2015). "Ethics: An Alternative Account of the Ford Pinto Case". Continuing Education and Development.
- Schwartz, Gary T. (1991). "The Myth of the Ford Pinto Case" (PDF). Rutgers Law Review. 43: 1013–1068.
- Sherefkin, Robert (June 16, 2003). "Lee Iacocca's Pinto: A fiery failure". Automotive News.
- Strobel, Lee (October 13, 1979). "Ford ignored Pinto fire peril, secret memos show; Tests of gas tank indicated hazards". Chicago Tribune. p. 1.
- Stuart, Reginald (June 11, 1980). "Government notifies Ford of possible recall for 16 million autos". The New York Times.
- Wojdyla, Ben (May 20, 2011). "The Top Automotive Engineering Failures: The Ford Pinto Fuel Tanks". Popular Mechanics.
