= Harris v. Balk =

- Supreme Court of the United States

Argued April 4, 1905 Decided May 1, 1905
- Full case name: Isaac N. Harris, plaintiff in error, v. B. Balk
- Citations: 198 U.S. 215 (more) 25 S. Ct. 625; 49 L. Ed. 1023

Holding
- State courts could assert through quasi in rem actions.

Court membership
- Chief Justice Melville Fuller Associate Justices John M. Harlan · David J. Brewer; Henry B. Brown · Edward D. White; Rufus W. Peckham · Joseph McKenna; Oliver W. Holmes Jr. · William R. Day

Case opinions
- Majority: Peckham, joined by Brewer, Brown, White, McKenna, Holmes
- Dissent: Harlan, joined by Day.
- Overruled by
- Shaffer v. Heitner, 433 U.S. 186 (1977)

Harris v. Balk, 198 U.S. 215 (1905), was a United States Supreme Court case that exemplified the idiosyncratic types of jurisdiction state courts (and therefore plaintiffs) could assert through quasi in rem actions before International Shoe's (1945) "minimum contacts" test replaced Pennoyer's (1878) principles of "power and notice".

This case involved three parties: Harris, Balk, and Epstein. Harris owed Balk money and Balk owed Epstein money. Thus, there was no debt relationship between Harris and Epstein. Harris and Balk lived in North Carolina while Epstein lived in Maryland. Harris traveled to Maryland. While he was there, Epstein attached the debt Harris owed Balk in order for Epstein to obtain jurisdiction over Balk. Through this, Epstein hoped to obtain the debt that Balk owed him by accessing the debt Harris owed Balk. Consequently, Epstein obtained a judgment against Balk which directed Harris to pay Epstein instead of Balk.

Under contemporary jurisdictional principles, a state court could not assert in personam jurisdiction over someone who was not physically served process in that state. However, if a defendant, on whom in personam jurisdiction was unable to be asserted, owned property in the state in which plaintiff was situated, plaintiff could "attach" to the action whatever property defendant owned in that state. Such an action was labeled quasi in rem and, when this occurred, state courts were permitted to assert jurisdiction over an out-of-state defendant on any matter, with the limitation that any remedy be limited to involving only the attached property.

As debt is considered actual property of the creditor, and, at the time was considered to be physically located with the debtor, when Harris entered Maryland, he brought along the debt he owed to Balk, allowing Epstein to attach it in a quasi in rem action and obtain jurisdiction over Balk.

The principles allowing the Maryland state court to assert jurisdiction in this case were subsequently overturned by the Supreme Court case in Shaffer v. Heitner (1977).

== See also ==
- List of United States Supreme Court cases, volume 198
- List of United States Supreme Court cases
