= Daimler AG v. Bauman =

- Supreme Court of the United States

Argued October 15, 2013 Decided January 14, 2014
- Full case name: DaimlerChrysler AG, Petitioner v. Barbara Bauman, et al.
- Docket no.: 11-965
- Citations: 571 U.S. 117 (more) 134 S. Ct. 746; 187 L. Ed. 2d 624; 2014 U.S. LEXIS 644; 82 U.S.L.W. 4043
- Argument: Oral argument
- Opinion announcement: Opinion announcement

Case history
- Prior: Plaintiffs' claims dismissed, Northern District of California; affirmed, 579 F.3d 1088 (9th Cir. 2009); reversed on rehearing, 644 F.3d 909 (9th Cir. 2011); rehearing en banc denied, 676 F.3d 774 (9th Cir. 2011).

Holding
- Daimler cannot be sued in California for injuries allegedly caused by conduct of its Argentinian subsidiary when that conduct took place entirely outside of the United States.

Court membership
- Chief Justice John Roberts Associate Justices Antonin Scalia · Anthony Kennedy; Clarence Thomas · Ruth Bader Ginsburg; Stephen Breyer · Samuel Alito; Sonia Sotomayor · Elena Kagan

Case opinions
- Majority: Ginsburg, joined by Roberts, Scalia, Kennedy, Thomas, Breyer, Alito, Kagan
- Concurrence: Sotomayor (in judgment)

Laws applied
- U.S. Const. amend. XIV

Daimler AG v. Bauman, 571 U.S. 117 (2014), is a United States Supreme Court case in which the Court answered whether an American court may exercise jurisdiction over a foreign company based on the fact that a subsidiary of the company acts on its behalf in the jurisdictional state. The court held that an American company cannot be sued for conduct occurring outside the United States and American courts do not have jurisdiction of such a claim.

== Background ==
Daimler Aktiengesellschaft is an automotive manufacturer based in Stuttgart, Germany, that owns Mercedes-Benz and its subsidiaries around the world, including in the United States and Argentina. During the Dirty War in Argentina, a labor dispute developed at the Mercedes-Benz plant in González Catán. Mercedes-Benz reported the labor leaders as "subversives" to the right-wing military junta, had junta forces stationed within the factory, and allowed the junta to conduct raids on workers. During the dispute, twenty-two labor leaders were kidnapped, tortured, and murdered. Afterwards, the police chief responsible for the "disappearances" was hired as Mercedes-Benz Argentina's chief of security and the company provided his legal defense against human rights abuse accusations.

Twenty years later, Mercedes-Benz's role in Argentina's Dirty War came to the attention of the German media. DaimlerChrysler AG responded to the accusations against its subsidiary by hiring Professor Christian Tomuschat to conduct an investigation. His exculpatory findings were criticized by Amnesty International.

In 2004, the survivors sued DaimlerChrysler AG in the United States District Court for the Northern District of California alleging that its subsidiary's activities during Argentina's Dirty War gave rise to claims under the Alien Tort Statute, the Torture Victim Protection Act, and California state tort law. District Judge Ronald M. Whyte dismissed the suit for lack of personal jurisdiction, finding that, under the law of agency, DaimlerChrysler's wholly owned subsidiary Mercedes-Benz USA is not an agent of its owner, and that it would be unreasonable to exercise jurisdiction directly over DaimlerChrysler. Plaintiffs appealed.

Before the United States Court of Appeals for the Ninth Circuit, Senior Circuit Judge Dorothy Wright Nelson, joined by Circuit Judge Mary M. Schroeder, affirmed, with Judge Stephen Reinhardt dissenting. Plaintiffs petitioned for a rehearing and, nine months later, the court granted the rehearing, vacated its earlier opinion and scheduled the case for reargument.

However, the court then cancelled the reargument and instead released a new opinion, authored by Judge Reinhardt, that came to the opposite of its earlier conclusion. The three-judge panel unanimously reversed the district court, finding that Mercedes-Benz USA was indeed an agent of DaimlerChrysler and that the exercise of personal jurisdiction over DaimlerChrysler was reasonable "under the circumstances of this case". The Ninth Circuit then denied DaimlerChrysler's petition for a rehearing en banc, with Judge Diarmuid O'Scannlain authoring a dissent joined by seven other judges.

DaimlerChrysler (by then renamed Daimler AG) petitioned for a writ of certiorari from the United States Supreme Court and the petition was granted. The case was argued on October 15, 2013, with Deputy Solicitor General Edwin Kneedler appearing as a friend in support of Daimler.

== Opinion of the Court ==
The Supreme Court unanimously reversed, with Justice Ruth Bader Ginsburg writing for the Court, "Exercises of personal jurisdiction so exorbitant, we hold, are barred by due process constraints." Justice Ginsburg, in an opinion joined by seven other justices, begins by tracing the jurisprudential history of in personam jurisdiction, beginning with the rigid territorial limits of Pennoyer v. Neff (1878). The Court saw International Shoe Co. v. Washington (1945) as later recognizing the distinction between specific jurisdiction, which includes only the specific conduct that connects the defendant to the territory, and general jurisdiction, which includes all the defendant's acts anywhere, and Ginsburg ends the history with her recent admonition to exercise general jurisdiction only when the defendant is “essentially at home” in the forum in Goodyear Dunlop Tires Operations, S.A. v. Brown (2011).

The Court finds that "in no event" can Reinhardt's agency theory be sustained. Noting that even the plaintiffs' brief had distanced itself from Reinhardt's logic, the Court largely adopts the criticisms of the Ninth Circuit judges dissenting from the denial of an en banc rehearing. The Court even goes so far as to emphasize that Reinhardt's formulation "stacks the deck" and would always have the same result of exercising jurisdiction.

The Court then goes further, writing, "Even if we were to assume that MBUSA is at home in California, and further to assume MBUSA's contacts are imputable to Daimler, there would still be no basis to subject Daimler to general jurisdiction in California." Daimler could not be subject to general jurisdiction in California because its agent's activity in California would merely establish specific jurisdiction in California. Justice Ginsburg rejects Justice Sotomayor's assertion that the Court had chosen to decide an issue not argued below, writing, "the question fairly encompasses an inquiry" into the agency relationship. The Court then implies that a corporation can only be "at home" and subject to general jurisdiction where it is incorporated or where it has its principal place of business.

Lastly, the Court notes that recent cases have rendered federal claims for human rights violations "infirm". Furthermore, the Court gives weight to the Solicitor General's suggestion that "international rapport" may be damaged when U.S. courts hear foreign corporations' foreign misdeeds.

== Concurrence in the judgment ==
Justice Sonia Sotomayor concurred in judgment only. Sotomayor agreed that Reinhardt's opinion is clearly in error, and suggests that personal jurisdiction is simply unreasonable because Germany has a far greater interest in resolving the dispute. Sotomayor considered the Court's opinion wrong in “both process and substance.” Procedurally, Sotomayor argued that Ginsburg strayed beyond the question briefed by assuming Mercedes Benz USA's agency relationship in the absence of an adequate factual record below. Substantively, Sotomayor argued that effectively limiting general jurisdiction to the principal place of business inherently favors larger businesses, making multinational corporations “too big for general jurisdiction”.

This, in her view, created manifold injustices. It is unjust by using the Constitution to limit the states' sovereign prerogative over the exercise of their courts’ jurisdiction. It is unjust to small businesses in that they will be subject to instate general jurisdiction while their multinational competitors will not. It is unjust to individuals because when visiting a state a natural person can be served with process and become subject to general jurisdiction while a fictional person cannot, even if that fictional person is a multinational corporation who has permanent employees in the state. Finally, Sotomayor views the Court's singular approach unjust because the result of limiting general jurisdiction is to shut the courthouse door, inevitably benefiting wrongdoers at the cost of those they have wronged.

== Reaction ==
During an interview Linda Greenhouse asked Justice Sotomayor about her concurrence in the judgment, noting that "you did not pull your punches", to which the justice replied "bad facts make bad law" and that she felt she needed to bring attention to "the dangers of the path the Court is on."

Scholars concluded that the Court's opinion "constitutes a radical departure from settled law," and that "the Court has severely constrained the reach of general jurisdiction in a way that would have been surprising just four years ago." At a symposium on the case, academics pronounced the "end of an era," encouraged a return to the International Shoe standard, or identified the need for new legislation.

In its 2017 decisions in BNSF Railway Co. v. Tyrrell and Bristol-Myers Squibb Co. v. Superior Court, the Supreme Court reaffirmed its adherence to the jurisdictional limitations recognized in Daimler.
