= List of United States Supreme Court cases, volume 95 =

Supreme Court of the United States
- Interactive map of Supreme Court of the United States
- 38°53′26″N 77°00′16″W
- Established: March 4, 1789; 236 years ago
- Location: Washington, D.C.
- Coordinates: 38°53′26″N 77°00′16″W
- Composition method: Presidential nomination with Senate confirmation
- Authorised by: Constitution of the United States, Art. III, § 1
- Judge term length: life tenure, subject to impeachment and removal
- Number of positions: 9 (by statute)
- Website: supremecourt.gov

This is a list of cases reported in volume 95 of United States Reports, decided by the Supreme Court of the United States in 1877 and 1878.

== Justices of the Supreme Court at the time of 95 U.S. ==
The Supreme Court is established by Article III, Section 1 of the Constitution of the United States, which says: "The judicial Power of the United States, shall be vested in one supreme Court . . .". The size of the Court is not specified; the Constitution leaves it to Congress to set the number of justices. Under the Judiciary Act of 1789 Congress originally fixed the number of justices at six (one chief justice and five associate justices). Since 1789 Congress has varied the size of the Court from six to seven, nine, ten, and back to nine justices (always including one chief justice).

When the cases in 95 U.S. were decided the Court comprised the following nine members:

Portrait	Justice	Office	Home State	Succeeded	Date confirmed by the Senate (Vote)	Tenure on Supreme Court
	Morrison Waite	Chief Justice	Ohio	Salmon P. Chase	January 21, 1874 (63–0)	March 4, 1874 – March 23, 1888 (Died)
	Nathan Clifford	Associate Justice	Maine	Benjamin Robbins Curtis	January 12, 1858 (26–23)	January 21, 1858 – July 25, 1881 (Died)
	Noah Haynes Swayne	Associate Justice	Ohio	John McLean	January 24, 1862 (38–1)	January 27, 1862 – January 24, 1881 (Retired)
	Samuel Freeman Miller	Associate Justice	Iowa	Peter Vivian Daniel	July 16, 1862 (Acclamation)	July 21, 1862 – October 13, 1890 (Died)
	Stephen Johnson Field	Associate Justice	California	newly created seat	March 10, 1863 (Acclamation)	May 10, 1863 – December 1, 1897 (Retired)
	William Strong	Associate Justice	Pennsylvania	Robert Cooper Grier	February 18, 1870 (No vote recorded)	March 14, 1870 – December 14, 1880 (Retired)
	Joseph P. Bradley	Associate Justice	New Jersey	newly created seat	March 21, 1870 (46–9)	March 23, 1870 – January 22, 1892 (Died)
	Ward Hunt	Associate Justice	New York	Samuel Nelson	December 11, 1872 (Acclamation)	January 9, 1873 – January 27, 1882 (Retired)
	John Marshall Harlan	Associate Justice	Kentucky	David Davis	November 29, 1877 (Acclamation)	December 10, 1877 – October 14, 1911 (Died)

== Notable Cases in 95 U.S. ==
=== Hall v. Decuir ===
In Hall v. Decuir, 95 U.S. 485 (1878), Josephine Decuir, a wealthy woman designated a Creole, sued for racial discrimination she experienced on a steamboat. She was traveling from New Orleans to Pointe Coupee Parish, where she owned a sugar plantation. The Supreme Court held that the Louisiana statute authorizing a damages award to Decuir unconstitutionally interfered with interstate commerce. The majority opinion, by Morrison Waite, sought to avoid conflicting state laws with regard to interstate transit. Hall marked the beginning of a phase in Supreme Court jurisprudence that reached its nadir in Plessy v. Ferguson.

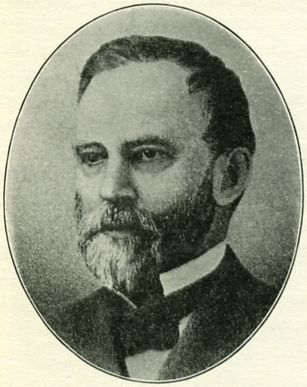
Sylvester Pennoyer

=== Pennoyer v. Neff ===
In Pennoyer v. Neff, 95 U.S. 714 (1878), the Supreme Court held that a state court can only exert personal jurisdiction over a party domiciled out-of-state if that party is served with process while physically present within the state. The Court was asked to determine whether a state court has personal jurisdiction over a non-resident (Neff) when such non-resident: (a) did not voluntarily appear before the court; (b) was not personally served with process while within the state; and (c) held property within the state at the time of the original lawsuit, but the property was not attached to the suit when it was initiated. The Court ruled in favor of Neff, holding that for the trial court to have jurisdiction over the property the property needed to be attached before the start of litigation, upon which the trial court has quasi in rem jurisdiction.

== Citation style ==
Under the Judiciary Act of 1789 the federal court structure at the time comprised District Courts, which had general trial jurisdiction; Circuit Courts, which had mixed trial and appellate (from the US District Courts) jurisdiction; and the United States Supreme Court, which had appellate jurisdiction over the federal District and Circuit courts—and for certain issues over state courts. The Supreme Court also had limited original jurisdiction (i.e., in which cases could be filed directly with the Supreme Court without first having been heard by a lower federal or state court). There were one or more federal District Courts and/or Circuit Courts in each state, territory, or other geographical region.

Bluebook citation style is used for case names, citations, and jurisdictions.

- "C.C.D." = United States Circuit Court for the District of . . .
  - e.g.,"C.C.D.N.J." = United States Circuit Court for the District of New Jersey
- "D." = United States District Court for the District of . . .
  - e.g.,"D. Mass." = United States District Court for the District of Massachusetts
- "E." = Eastern; "M." = Middle; "N." = Northern; "S." = Southern; "W." = Western
  - e.g.,"C.C.S.D.N.Y." = United States Circuit Court for the Southern District of New York
  - e.g.,"M.D. Ala." = United States District Court for the Middle District of Alabama
- "Ct. Cl." = United States Court of Claims
- The abbreviation of a state's name alone indicates the highest appellate court in that state's judiciary at the time.
  - e.g.,"Pa." = Supreme Court of Pennsylvania
  - e.g.,"Me." = Supreme Judicial Court of Maine

== List of cases in 95 U.S. ==
Case Name	Page & year	Opinion of the Court	Concurring opinion(s)	Dissenting opinion(s)	Lower court	Disposition
Pacific R.R. v. Ketchum	1 (1877)	Waite	none	none	not indicated	appointment denied
Phipps v. Sedgwick	3 (1877)	Miller	none	none	C.C.S.D.N.Y.	multiple
Shaw v. Bill	10 (1877)	Field	none	none	C.C.D. Ind.	affirmed
N.O. Canal & Banking Co. v. Montgomery	16 (1877)	Swayne	none	none	C.C.S.D. Miss.	reversed
Adams v. City of Nashville	19 (1877)	Hunt	none	none	Tenn.	affirmed
Reed v. Merchants' Mut. Ins. Co.	23 (1877)	Bradley	none	none	C.C.D. Md.	affirmed
van Reynegan v. Bolton	33 (1877)	Field	none	none	C.C.D. Cal.	affirmed
McMillen v. Anderson	37 (1877)	Miller	none	none	La.	affirmed
Pratt v. Grand Trunk Ry. Co.	43 (1877)	Hunt	none	none	C.C.E.D. Mich.	affirmed
Hatch v. Coddington	48 (1877)	Strong	none	none	C.C.S.D.N.Y.	affirmed
McHenry v. La Société Française d'Épargnes	58 (1877)	Waite	none	none	Cal.	affirmed
Chouteau v. United States	61 (1877)	Miller	none	none	Ct. Cl.	affirmed
Ex parte Easton	68 (1877)	Clifford	none	none	C.C.E.D.N.Y.	prohibition denied
Lake Shore & M.S.R.R. Co. v. Rose	78 (1877)	Swayne	none	none	C.C.N.D. Ohio	affirmed
Packet Co. v. City of Keokuk	80 (1877)	Strong	none	none	Iowa	affirmed
Good v. Martin	90 (1877)	Clifford	none	none	Sup. Ct. Terr. Colo.	affirmed
Buffington v. Harvey	99 (1877)	Bradley	none	none	C.C.S.D. Ill.	affirmed
New Jersey v. Yard	104 (1877)	Miller	none	none	N.J.	reversed
Aetna Fire Ins. Co. v. Boon	117 (1877)	Strong	none	Clifford, Field	C.C.D. Conn.	reversed
Movius v. Arthur	144 (1877)	Hunt	none	none	C.C.S.D.N.Y.	affirmed
Knote v. United States	149 (1877)	Field	none	none	Ct. Cl.	affirmed
Brown v. Buena Vista Cnty.	157 (1877)	Swayne	none	none	C.C.D. Iowa	reversed
Continental Impr. Co. v. Stead	161 (1877)	Bradley	none	none	C.C.D. Ind.	affirmed
Cairo & F.R.R. Co. v. Hecht	168 (1877)	Waite	none	none	Ark.	affirmed
Insurance Co. v. Lanier	171 (1877)	Strong	none	none	C.C.S.D. Ga.	affirmed
Blount v. Windley	173 (1877)	Miller	none	none	N.C.	affirmed
West Phila. Bank v. Dickson	180 (1877)	Hunt	none	none	C.C.E.D. Pa.	affirmed
Phoenix Ins. Co. v. Pechner	183 (1877)	Waite	none	none	N.Y.	affirmed
Amory v. Amory	186 (1877)	Waite	none	none	N.Y. Super. Ct.	affirmed
Kerr v. Clampitt	188 (1877)	Field	none	none	Sup. Ct. Terr. Utah	affirmed
Fabbri v. Murphy	191 (1877)	Clifford	none	none	C.C.S.D.N.Y.	affirmed
Preston v. Preston	200 (1877)	Field	none	none	C.C.W.D. Va.	affirmed
Bates v. Clark	204 (1877)	Miller	none	none	Sup. Ct. Terr. Dakota	affirmed
Radich v. Hutchins	210 (1877)	Field	none	none	C.C.E.D. Tex.	affirmed
Roemer v. Simon	214 (1877)	Clifford	none	none	C.C.D.N.J.	affirmed
Ex parte South & N.A.R.R. Co.	221 (1877)	Waite	none	none	C.C.M.D. Ala.	mandamus granted
Insurance Co. v. Express Co.	227 (1877)	Strong	none	none	C.C.S.D.N.Y.	reversed
Charter Oak Life Ins. Co. v. Rodel	232 (1877)	Bradley	none	none	C.C.E.D. Mo.	affirmed
Insurance Co. v. Haven	242 (1877)	Clifford	none	none	C.C.N.D. Ill.	affirmed
Milner v. Meek	252 (1877)	Waite	none	none	C.C.S.D. Ohio	reversed
Colorado Co. v. Commissioners	259 (1877)	Miller	none	none	Colo.	reversed
Nimick v. Coleman	266 (1877)	Waite	none	none	C.C.W.D. Pa.	dismissed
Brooklyn Ins. Co. v. Dutcher	269 (1877)	Swayne	none	none	C.C.E.D. Mo.	affirmed
Keystone Bridge Co. v. Phoenix Iron Co.	274 (1877)	Bradley	none	none	C.C.E.D. Pa.	affirmed
Kansas P. Ry. Co. v. Stewart	279 (1877)	Waite	none	none	C.C.D. Kan.	reversed
Cambuston v. United States	285 (1877)	Waite	none	none	D. Cal.	dismissed
Beckwith v. Talbot	289 (1877)	Bradley	none	none	Sup. Ct. Terr. Colo.	affirmed
Pearson v. Yewdall	294 (1877)	Waite	none	none	Pa.	dismissed
Eastern Trans. Line v. Hope	297 (1877)	Hunt	none	none	C.C.E.D. Pa.	affirmed
Ould v. Washington Hosp.	303 (1877)	Swayne	none	none	Sup. Ct. D.C.	affirmed
Hart v. United States	316 (1877)	Waite	none	none	C.C.N.D. Ohio	affirmed
Shields v. Ohio	319 (1877)	Swayne	none	Strong	Ohio	affirmed
Globe Mut. Life Ins. Co. v. Wolff	326 (1877)	Field	none	none	C.C.E.D. Mo.	reversed
United States v. Babbitt	334 (1877)	Swayne	none	none	C.C.D. Iowa	reversed
Bergdoll v. Pollock	337 (1877)	Waite	none	none	C.C.E.D. Pa.	affirmed
Merchants' Nat'l Bank v. Cook	342 (1877)	Hunt	none	none	C.C.S.D. Ohio	affirmed
Sessions v. Johnson	347 (1877)	Clifford	none	none	C.C.D. Mass.	affirmed
Cochrane v. Deener	355 (1877)	Bradley	none	none	Sup. Ct. D.C.	vacation denied
Alvord v. United States	356 (1877)	Miller	none	none	Ct. Cl.	reversed
Cass Cnty. v. Johnston	360 (1877)	Waite	none	Bradley	C.C.W.D. Mo.	affirmed
Cass Cnty. v. Jordan	373 (1877)	Waite	none	none	C.C.W.D. Mo.	affirmed
Cass Cnty. v. Shores	375 (1877)	Waite	none	none	C.C.W.D. Mo.	affirmed
Mutual Benefit Life Ins. Co. v. Higginbotham	380 (1877)	Hunt	none	none	Sup. Ct. D.C.	affirmed
Thompson v. Maxwell	391 (1877)	Bradley	none	none	N.M.	reversed
Briges v. Sperry	401 (1877)	Miller	none	none	C.C.D. Cal.	affirmed
United States v. Gillis	407 (1877)	Strong	Bradley	none	Ct. Cl.	reversed
Turnbull v. Payson	418 (1877)	Clifford	none	none	C.C.D. Md.	affirmed
N.Y. Life Ins. Co. v. Davis	425 (1877)	Bradley	none	none	C.C.E.D. Va.	reversed
Beard v. Burts	434 (1877)	Strong	none	none	Tenn.	reversed
Railroad Co. v. Jones	439 (1877)	Swayne	none	none	Sup. Ct. D.C.	reversed
Williams v. Morris	444 (1877)	Clifford	none	none	Sup. Ct. D.C.	reversed
Pound v. Turck	459 (1878)	Miller	none	none	C.C.W.D. Wis.	reversed
Hannibal & S.J.R.R. Co. v. Husen	465 (1878)	Strong	none	none	Mo.	reversed
Brown v. Spofford	474 (1877)	Clifford	none	none	Sup. Ct. D.C.	affirmed
Hall v. Decuir	485 (1878)	Waite	Clifford	none	La.	reversed
Beecher v. Wetherby	517 (1877)	Field	none	none	C.C.E.D. Wis.	affirmed
The Grace Lothrop	527 (1877)	Clifford	none	none	C.C.D. Mass.	affirmed
United States v. Smith	536 (1877)	Clifford	none	none	C.C.D. Mass.	certification
Clark v. United States	539 (1877)	Bradley	none	Miller	Ct. Cl.	reversed
Germania Fire Ins. Co. v. Thompson	547 (1877)	Miller	none	none	C.C.D. Ky.	affirmed
Morrow v. Whitney	551 (1877)	Field	none	none	Wis.	reversed
West St. Louis Sav. Bank v. Shawnee Cnty. Bank	557 (1877)	Waite	none	none	C.C.D. Kan.	affirmed
Eddy v. Dennis	560 (1877)	Hunt	none	none	C.C.N.D.N.Y.	reversed
United States v. 200 Barrels of Whiskey	571 (1877)	Waite	none	none	C.C.D. La.	affirmed
Union P.R.R. Co. v. Durant	576 (1877)	Swayne	none	none	C.C.D. Neb.	reversed
United States v. Mann	580 (1878)	Clifford	none	none	C.C.D. Minn.	affirmed
Mitchell v. Moore	587 (1877)	Waite	none	none	C.C.S.D. Ala.	affirmed
Given v. Hilton	591 (1877)	Strong	none	none	Sup. Ct. D.C.	reversed
The Wanata	600 (1877)	Clifford	none	none	C.C.S.D.N.Y.	affirmed
Henry Cnty. v. Nicolay	619 (1877)	Bradley	none	none	C.C.W.D. Mo.	affirmed
Terry v. Anderson	628 (1877)	Waite	none	none	C.C.S.D. Ga.	affirmed
Burdette v. Bartlett	637 (1878)	Hunt	none	none	Sup. Ct. D.C.	affirmed
Young v. United States	641 (1877)	Waite	none	none	Ct. Cl.	dismissed
City of New Orleans v. Clark	644 (1877)	Field	none	none	C.C.D. La.	affirmed
Railway Co. v. Stevens	655 (1878)	Bradley	none	none	C.C.D. Me.	affirmed
United States v. Wilcox	661 (1878)	Strong	none	none	Ct. Cl.	affirmed
Chubb v. Upton	665 (1877)	Hunt	none	none	C.C.W.D. Mich.	affirmed
United States v. Fox	670 (1878)	Field	none	none	C.C.S.D.N.Y.	certification
First Nat'l Bank v. Hartford Fire Ins. Co.	673 (1878)	Harlan	none	none	C.C.W.D. Mo.	reversed
Farrington v. Tennessee	679 (1878)	Swayne	none	Strong	Tenn.	reversed
Thompson v. Butler	694 (1878)	Waite	none	none	C.C.D. Mass.	dismissed
Chicago, R.I. & P.R.R. Co. v. City of Houston	697 (1878)	Field	none	none	C.C.W.D. Mo.	reversed
Neal v. Clark	704 (1878)	Harlan	none	none	Va.	reversed
Kelly v. Calhoun	710 (1878)	Swayne	none	none	C.C.W.D. Tenn.	affirmed
Pennoyer v. Neff	714 (1878)	Field	none	Hunt	C.C.D. Or.	affirmed
United States v. Meigs	748 (1878)	Miller	none	none	Ct. Cl.	reversed
United States v. McLean	750 (1878)	Strong	none	none	Ct. Cl.	reversed
Mobile Life Ins. Co. v. Brame	754 (1878)	Hunt	none	none	C.C.D. La.	affirmed
United States v. Moore	760 (1878)	Swayne	none	none	Ct. Cl.	reversed
Yeatman v. New Orleans Sav. Inst.	764 (1878)	Harlan	none	none	C.C.D. La.	affirmed
United States v. Clark Cnty.	769 (1878)	Strong	none	none	C.C.E.D. Mo.	affirmed
City of Alexandria v. Fairfax	774 (1878)	Miller	none	none	Va.	affirmed
