= Ford Motor Co. v. Montana Eighth Judicial District =

- Supreme Court of the United States

Argued October 7, 2020 Decided March 25, 2021
- Full case name: Ford Motor Company v. Montana Eighth Judicial District Court, et al.
- Docket nos.: 19-368; 19-369
- Citations: 592 U.S. 351 (more)

Holding
- The connection between the plaintiffs’ claims and Ford’s activities in the forum States is close enough to support specific jurisdiction.

Court membership
- Chief Justice John Roberts Associate Justices Clarence Thomas · Stephen Breyer; Samuel Alito · Sonia Sotomayor; Elena Kagan · Neil Gorsuch; Brett Kavanaugh · Amy Coney Barrett

Case opinions
- Majority: Kagan, joined by Roberts, Breyer, Sotomayor, Kavanaugh
- Concurrence: Alito (in judgment)
- Concurrence: Gorsuch (in judgment), joined by Thomas
- Barrett took no part in the consideration or decision of the case.

Laws applied
- U.S. Const. Amend. XIV

Ford Motor Co. v. Montana Eighth Judicial District, 592 U.S. 351 (2021), was a U.S. Supreme Court case involving personal jurisdiction of a state court in product liability lawsuits against an out-of-state manufacturer. The case, consolidated with Ford Motor Co. v. Bandemer, involved two product liability lawsuits brought against the Ford Motor Company at the state level related to two drivers' injuries in separate accidents involving Ford's vehicles in Montana and Minnesota. Ford challenged the lawsuits as the vehicles in question were designed, manufactured, and sold in other states, and therefore Ford contended that the states in which the accidents actually occurred did not have specific personal jurisdiction over its allegedly tortious conduct. The Supreme Court ruled in a 8–0 decision that under the Due Process Clause, the plaintiffs' claims "arise out of or relate to" Ford's business and marketing activities and in turn those activities support the states' exercise of specific personal jurisdiction over the liability lawsuits.

== Background ==
Two 2015 traffic collisions involving Ford vehicles were at the basis of the case. In Montana, a collision involving a separated tire tread on a Ford Explorer caused the death of the driver, Markkaya Gullett. In Minnesota, Adam Bandemer rear-ended a snow plow in a Ford Crown Victoria causing him to end up in a ditch, but the car's air bags failed to deploy and he suffered a brain injury. In both cases, the parties (Gullett's estate and Bandemer) sued Ford for various defects in their products in their respective state courts.

Meanwhile, during the 2000s and 2010s, the U.S. Supreme Court had developed an important distinction in its case law between general and specific personal jurisdiction. In Goodyear Dunlop Tires Operations, S.A. v. Brown (2011), the Supreme Court held that general personal jurisdiction applies only when the defendant's connections to the forum are so strong that it is "essentially at home" in the forum state. For most corporate defendants sued outside of the states in which they are headquartered or incorporated, this meant the forum state could only exercise specific personal jurisdiction, which traditionally turns on whether the plaintiff's claims "arise out of or relate to" the defendant's activities in the forum state. In Bristol-Myers Squibb Co. v. Superior Court (2017), the Supreme Court held that out-of-state plaintiffs in complex litigation in a state court could not piggyback on in-state plaintiffs' claims to establish specific personal jurisdiction as to their own claims because the out-of-state plaintiffs' claims did not "arise out of or relate to" the defendant's activities in the forum state.

It was the court's holding in Bristol-Myers Squibb which laid the foundation for the question presented in Ford Motor Company: whether the phrase "arise out of or relate to" requires the plaintiff to establish a direct causal connection between the defendant's activities in the forum state and the plaintiff's injuries as a predicate to the state court's exercise of specific personal jurisdiction. In other words, to establish personal jurisdiction over Ford, did the plaintiffs need to show that they bought the cars in the forum states as a result of Ford's marketing and selling of its cars in those specific states?

Ford filed motions to dismiss in both cases on the basis that the state courts lacked personal jurisdiction. Ford argued that the cars themselves were designed, manufactured, and sold in other states or in Canada, and it was only through buyers' independent actions after first sale that the cars eventually ended up in the forum states. Thus, Ford contended, there was no direct connection between its activities of designing, manufacturing, and selling the cars in other states and the accidents in the forum states for the state courts of the latter states to exercise jurisdiction. These motions were rejected by state district courts and again on appeals to both the Montana Supreme Court and Minnesota Supreme Court, which upheld lower court rulings that Ford's activities included purposeful promotions and sales of vehicles to their states' residents. Under the Due Process Clause, the courts ruled that the plaintiffs' claims "arise out of or relate to" Ford's business activities in their states, thus allowing the state courts to hear these cases.

== Supreme Court ==
In 2019, Ford filed petitions for writs of certiorari to review the adverse state court holdings. Ford presented the question of whether the "arise out of or relate to" requirement of the Due Process Clause is met even when none of their in-state activities caused the claims in the plaintiffs' cases. The Supreme Court agreed in January 2020 to hear both cases, consolidating them under the Montana petition. Oral arguments were heard on October 7, 2020; this was a case that followed the death of Justice Ruth Bader Ginsburg but prior to the appointment of Amy Coney Barrett as her replacement, and Barrett did not participate on further deliberations for the case.

The Court issued its 8–0 decision on March 25, 2021, which upheld the states' courts exercise of specific personal jurisdiction over Ford and allowed the cases to move forward. Justice Elena Kagan wrote the majority opinion and was joined by Chief Justice John Roberts and Justices Stephen Breyer, Sonia Sotomayor, and Brett Kavanaugh.

Kagan's opinion rejected Ford's arguments for a direct causal connection by going back to basics: the entire point of the court's elaborate tests for personal jurisdiction is whether it is fair and reasonable to exercise jurisdiction because Ford received clear notice that it could be sued in the forum state. In this case, Ford "systematically served a market in Montana and Minnesota for the very vehicles that the plaintiffs allege malfunctioned and injured them in those States," which in turn established "a strong 'relationship among the defendant, the forum, and the litigation'". Kagan stressed Ford's connections to the forum state: "By every means imaginable — among them, billboards, TV and radio spots, print ads and direct mail — Ford urges Montanans and Minnesotans to buy its vehicles, including (at all relevant times) Explorers and Crown Victorias", and among other numerous business activities, Ford "encourage[s] Montanans and Minnesotans to become lifelong Ford drivers." Thus, the states had an ample basis to find that the plaintiffs' claims "arise out of or relate to" Ford's activities.

Justice Samuel Alito wrote a concurring opinion, while Justice Neil Gorsuch also wrote a concurring opinion, joined by Justice Clarence Thomas. Both concurrences agreed with the final outcome of this case but stressed that the majority's test based on the phrase "arise out of or relate to" may give rise to further complexity in trying to evaluate future liability cases. Gorsuch singled out the court's continued reliance on International Shoe Co. v. Washington as outdated and favoring corporations. Gorsuch wrote that "Nearly 80 years removed from ''International Shoe'', corporations continue to receive special jurisdictional protections in the name of the Constitution. Less clear is why." Gorsuch favored a simpler "but-for" causation test instead, noting that the majority's decision might have a disparate impact on small businesses.
