= Personal jurisdiction over international defendants in the United States =

Questions over personal jurisdiction over foreign defendants in the United States arise when foreign nationals commit crimes against Americans, or when a person from or in a different country is sued in U.S. courts, or when events took place in another country. Such cases arise when crimes are committed on the high seas or on international flights, when crimes are alleged to be committed by or against Americans in foreign countries (such as under the Foreign Corrupt Practices Act), or when crimes are committed by foreigners against Americans. The Internet also allows computer crime to cross international boundaries.

== Mechanism in public international law for exercising jurisdiction over an international defendant ==
There are several mechanisms in public international law whereby the courts of one country (the domestic court) can exercise jurisdiction over a citizen, corporation, or organization of another country (the foreign defendant) to try crimes or civil matters that have affected citizens or businesses within the domestic jurisdiction. Many of these jurisdictional "hooks" can even reach conduct that affected the domestic citizen when the citizen was beyond his or her domestic borders. There are five such doctrines:

- The territorial principle is the most important and widely used. It is the idea that a state may claim jurisdiction over persons and events inside its own territory. So, foreign nationals committing crimes in the U.S. are subject to U.S. courts and U.S. laws.
- The nationality principle holds that the government of a citizen can obtain jurisdiction over its citizen even when that citizen is abroad. For example, U.S. citizens are still required to pay federal taxes to the U.S. government when abroad and may be prosecuted for a failure to do so.
- The passive personality principle is a unique offshoot of the nationality principle. It looks to the nationality of the victim to determine jurisdiction, holding that a state may assert jurisdiction over persons and events outside a state's territory on the basis that its citizen has been harmed. In the case of United States v. Roberts, 1 F.Supp. 2d 601 (E.D. La. 1998), which had an unusual set of facts, the victim of a crime of sexual abuse of a minor (who was a U.S. citizen) had a case tried against her aggressor who was a citizen of the Caribbean island of Saint Vincent and the Grenadines. The crime took place on international waters on board a ship registered in Liberia and owned by a company incorporated in the Republic of Panama. None of the regular methods of jurisdiction, forum non conveniens, or comity would have worked. Id. The defendant was indicted by a federal grand jury in the Eastern District of Louisiana and the defendant's motion to dismiss for lack of personal jurisdiction was denied by the federal district court, which found jurisdiction under the passive personality principle.
- The protective principle is one of national security and it holds that a state may have jurisdiction over a defendant accused of acts in pursuance of overthrowing the host state's government. See United States v. Yousef, 327 F3d 56 (2d Cir. 2003).
- The universality principle (principle of universal jurisdiction) is closely aligned with the international law doctrine of peremptory norms (jus cogens). The principle holds that all states have jurisdiction over crimes that are universally recognized to be a crime against humanity. These have historically included piracy, slave-trading, torture, genocide, and perhaps terrorism.

In the United States, the federal courts have recognized an important mechanism for acquiring jurisdiction over foreign defendants known as the effects doctrine. The effects doctrine is an offshoot of the territorial principle. Briefly, the effects doctrine says that if the effects of extraterritorial behavior or crimes adversely affect commerce or harm citizens within the United States, then jurisdiction in a U.S. court is permissible. The first case to establish the effects doctrine was United States v. Alcoa, 148 F.2d 416 (2d Cir. 1945) (Learned Hand, J.).

The ALCOA case brought charges against a foreign consortium of aluminum traders and producers who had affected the price of raw aluminum and goods manufactured from aluminum in the United States through unfair trade practices of price fixing in violation of section 1 of the Sherman Antitrust Act ("every contract, combination ... or conspiracy, in restraint of trade or commerce among the several States, or with foreign nations, is declared to be illegal"). The effects doctrine has also been incorporated into § 402 of the Restatement of Foreign Relations Law of the United States, Third: "a state has jurisdiction to prescribe law with respect to ... (c) conduct outside its territory that has or is intended to have substantial effect within its territory."

== Raju case ==
In one case, the decision to allow jurisdiction in a U.S. court over claims of copyright infringement and cybersquatting was premised on an effects doctrine theory of jurisdiction. Graduate Management Admission Council v. Raju, 241 F.Supp.2d 589 (E.D. Va., 2003). The defendant in Raju was a citizen of India who sold "official" past Graduate Record Examinations (GREs) to U.S. customers that were of dubious origin and in violation of the plaintiff, copyright-holder Graduate Management Admission Council (GMAC). These exams were advertised and sold over the Internet.

The defendant never made an appearance on U.S. territory depriving the plaintiffs of one easy avenue of obtaining in personam jurisdiction over the defendant – the simple act of being able to serve process on the defendant while the defendant is visiting and within the territory of the United States (this would be the traditional territorial principle of jurisdiction at work, to use terms of international law). The defendant was not a citizen of a particular state. The court described the jurisdiction it exercised over Raju's conduct of selling illegal copies of the exams to potential purchasers in several states within the territory of the U.S. as "targeting" the U.S. market for U.S. purchasers. Under these circumstances, the court found that personal jurisdiction was proper under a theory of national jurisdiction: the defendant had targeted the U.S. at large from outside of the territory and intended to avail himself of the opportunity of selling test answers to a U.S. graduate school entrance test to his most likely customers: Americans.

A judgment was issued against the defendant Raju who defaulted by never making an appearance to the district court where he was being sued.

== Additional cases ==
In a procedurally complicated case, Yahoo! Inc. v. La Ligue Contre Le Racisme et l'Antisemitisme (LICRA), the 9th Circuit Court of Appeals held that it had personal jurisdiction over two French organizations who sued Yahoo! in a French court. The court found that all of the following acts, in combination, were sufficient contacts to create personal jurisdiction over the French organizations: sending letters to Yahoo!, suing Yahoo! and serving Yahoo! in California, and the suit resulting in orders that Yahoo!'s officers in California comply with French law.
