= Lucy Switzer =

American temperance and suffrage activist (1844–1922)

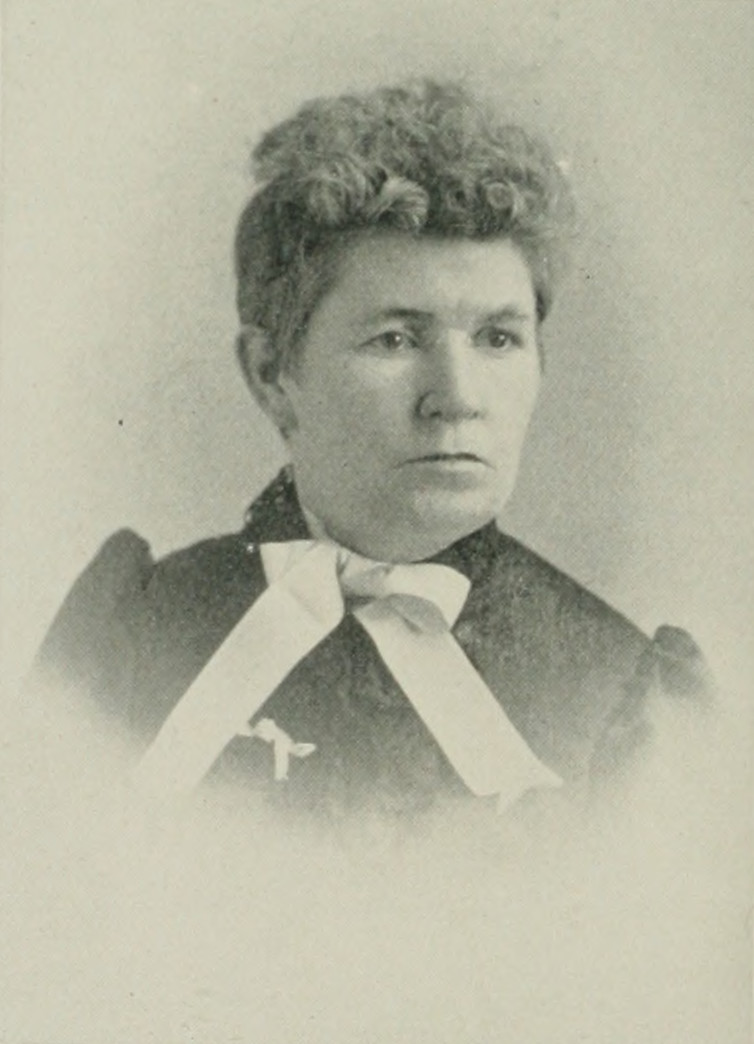
- "A Woman of the Century"
- Born: Lucy Ann Robbins; March 28, 1844; Lowell, Massachusetts, US
- Died: May 24, 1922 (aged 78); Spokane, Washington
- Occupations: activist; writer
- Spouses: Frederick Messer (m. 1864; died 1880); W. D. Switzer (m. 1881)
- Writing career
- Subject: temperance

Lucy Switzer (née, Robbins; after first marriage, Messer; after second marriage, Switzer; March 28, 1844 - May 24, 1922) was an American temperance and suffrage activist. She wrote many articles for Pacific Christian Advocate and the Christian Herald, and was a columnist in Cheney, Spokane County, Washington. She established the women's suffrage movement in eastern Washington Territory.

== Early life ==
Lucy Ann Robbins was born in Lowell, Massachusetts, March 28, 1844. (Note: According to the Cheney Museum, Switzer was born on March 3, 1844.) Her father was John Robbins. Her mother, Jane Bodwell Barnett Robbins, was born in Methuen, Massachusetts in 1815. She was an educator and pioneer in Wisconsin in 1855, in Minnesota in 1856, and in Washington Territory in 1878. She was an active teacher, Sunday school and Woman's Christian Temperance Union (WCTU) worker, as well as a missionary and suffrage patron. She voted in the years 1881–87 in Washington Territory, and was well known throughout the territory. Jane died in 1894, in Cheney.

Jane and John Robbins were natives of Massachusetts and both of English and Scotch descent. The families of both Mr. and Mrs. Robbins were of the orthodox Congregational faith of New England. Lucy had at least three siblings, a brother, and sisters, Charlotte and Sarah. In 1855, the family moved to Wisconsin, and the next spring, found them on a prairie farm in Minnesota (Greenwood Prairie), near Plainview. At thirteen years of age, she took note of such remarks as "petticoat government of Great Britain" and "a woman's school," and, considering these matters, she reasoned out the question of the equality of woman socially, politically and religiously, and thereafter held to those principles. She soon became a believer in and an advocate of total abstinence, after seeing something of the effects of the use of intoxicants by a young man who worked for her father on the farm, and on hearing the sneering and abusive language used in referring to him by a neighbor, who was a moderate drinker.

== Career ==
In September, 1864, she married Frederick Messer, formerly of New Hampshire. They united with the Methodist Episcopal Church in Plainview, Minnesota, in 1869. In 1877, she took up the work of the Woman's Foreign Missionary Society of the Methodist Episcopal Church and the WCTU in Lynnville, Iowa. His health had suffered while serving during the Civil War, and after many changes of residence for his benefit, he died in North Platte, Nebraska, in 1880.

Switzer's parents had moved to Deep Creek in Spokane County, Washington. After Switzer became widowed in 1880, she removed to Cheney, in that county. She spent a few weeks in Colfax Whitman County, Washington where she organized a union in October, 1880. By winter 1880, Switzer's parents joined her in Cheney.

Switzer established the suffrage movement in 1881 in eastern Washington. On June 15, 1881, she married W. D. Switzer, a druggist of Cheney. Immediately on the organization of the Cheney Methodist Church, Switzer was made its class-leader, and held the position three years. The work of the WCTU was not forgotten. A union was formed in Cheney in 1881, and Bands of Hope were formed in Cheney and Spokane, Washington. In 1882, she was appointed vice-president of the WCTU for Washington Territory, and before Frances Willard's visit in June and July, 1883, Switzer had organized in Spokane Falls, Waitsburg, Dayton, Tumwater, Olympia, Port Townsend, Tacoma, and Steilacoom. She arranged for eastern Washington a convention in Cheney, 20–23 July 1883. In that year, women in Washington Territory received full voting rights.

Switzer was a columnist in Cheney. Many articles were also written by her for the Pacific Christian Advocate and the Christian Herald on all phases of the WCTU thereby helping to institute the work over all the Pacific coast of the northern United States. She served as president of the Eastern Washington State Union since 1884. The campaigns of 1885 and 1886 for scientific instruction and local option, and the constitutional campaigns for prohibition and woman suffrage were matters of record, although in the constitutional campaign, the right did not prevail. She traveled thousands of miles in the work, having attended the national conventions in Detroit, Philadelphia, Minneapolis, Nashville, New York City, Chicago. and Boston, and also the Centennial Temperance Conference in Philadelphia in 1885, and the National Prohibition Convention in Indianapolis in 1888, as one of the two delegates from the Prohibition Party of Washington.

She served as juror on the petit jury in the district court in Cheney for twenty days in November, 1884, and February, 1885, and was made foreman and secretary of several cases. She was active during the years from 1883 to 1888, when women had the ballot in Washington, voting twice in Territorial elections and several times in municipal and special elections.

== Death ==
Switzer died May 24, 1922, at the Samaritan home in Spokane.
