= Bristol-Myers Squibb Co. v. Superior Court =

Bristol-Myers Squibb Co. v. Superior Court of California, San Francisco County
- Supreme Court of the United States

Argued April 25, 2017 Decided June 19, 2017
- Full case name: Bristol-Myers Squibb Company, Petitioner v. Superior Court of California, San Francisco County, et al.
- Docket no.: 16-466
- Citations: 582 U.S. 255 (more) 137 S. Ct. 1773; 198 L. Ed. 2d 395
- Opinion announcement: Opinion announcement

Case history
- Prior: 1 Cal.5th 783, 206 Cal. Rptr. 3d 636, 377 P.3d 874 (2016); cert. granted, 137 S. Ct. 827 (2017).

Holding
- A state lacks personal jurisdiction over a defendant on claims brought by plaintiffs who are not California residents and did not suffer their alleged injury in California.

Court membership
- Chief Justice John Roberts Associate Justices Anthony Kennedy · Clarence Thomas; Ruth Bader Ginsburg · Stephen Breyer; Samuel Alito · Sonia Sotomayor; Elena Kagan · Neil Gorsuch

Case opinions
- Majority: Alito, joined by Roberts, Kennedy, Thomas, Ginsburg, Breyer, Kagan, Gorsuch
- Dissent: Sotomayor

Laws applied
- U.S. Const. amend. XIV

Bristol-Myers Squibb Co. v. Superior Court of California, San Francisco County, 582 U.S. 255 (2017), was a United States Supreme Court case in which the Court held that California courts lacked personal jurisdiction over the defendant on claims brought by plaintiffs who are not California residents and did not suffer their alleged injury in California. It is part of a group of six cases decided since 2011 that have greatly changed the application of personal jurisdiction.

== Background ==
Bristol-Myers is a large pharmaceutical company that is incorporated in Delaware and has its principal place of business in New York. The company manufactured and distributed the blood-thinning drug Plavix. A group of people who claimed they had been injured by taking Plavix, consisting of 86 California residents and 592 residents of other states, sued Bristol-Myers in California. Bristol-Myers sought to dismiss the claims of the non-California resident plaintiffs on the ground that the courts of California, a state where the company was neither incorporated nor headquartered, lacked personal jurisdiction over the company with respect to claimants who were not injured in California.

The California courts initially held that California had "general jurisdiction" over Bristol-Myers based on the company's extensive business ties with California. Subsequently, the U.S. Supreme Court decided Daimler AG v. Bauman, which held that a corporation is ordinarily subject to general jurisdiction only in its state of incorporation and the state where it maintains its principal place of business. Following Daimler, the California courts determined that they did not have general jurisdiction over Bristol-Myers. However, the California Supreme Court upheld personal jurisdiction in this case, as to both the resident and non-resident plaintiffs.

The U.S. Supreme Court granted certiorari to review the California Supreme Court's decision.

== Opinion of the Court ==
Associate Justice Samuel Alito authored the majority opinion, which was joined by all but one of the Justices.

The Court held that California state courts did not have jurisdiction over Bristol-Myers with respect to the non-residents' claims. Specific jurisdiction may exist only where the events underlying the lawsuit arise out of or relate to the defendant's contact with the forum state. Here, the non-resident plaintiffs were not prescribed Plavix in California, did not ingest it in California, and were not injured in California, nor was the drug manufactured in the state. The necessary affiliation between these plaintiffs' claims and the defendant's activities within the forum were thus lacking. The facts that other plaintiffs purchased the drug and were injured in California, and that Bristol-Myers engages in extensive research activities in California unrelated to Plavix, were irrelevant.

The Court concluded that its decision did not prevent the members of the plaintiff class from pursuing their claims. The options included bringing suit on behalf of all the claimants in Delaware or New York, or separate suits in the various states where different claimants reside. In addition, because the decision was based on application of the Due Process Clause to state courts, the Court reserved decision on whether the same jurisdictional limitations would apply to an action brought in federal court.

The key issue was that there was not a direct relation between the nonresidents' claims and the activities of Bristol-Meyers. Since the nonresidents had not bought Plavix in California, nor did they suffer the ill-effects of Plavix there, there could be no direct relation.

== Dissenting opinion ==
Justice Sonia Sotomayor dissented. She found nothing unfair or contrary to due process in allowing the claims of a nationwide class of people allegedly injured by the same conduct of the same defendant, which is a Fortune 500 pharmaceutical company doing business nationwide, to be brought in a single litigation. The jurisdictional limitations announced in this case, in Sotomayor's view, would result in unnecessary multiple litigation as cases are brought in multiple states, and may deter some injured parties from pursuing their claims at all.

== Impact ==
The case has further increased the difficulty for plaintiffs to succeed in tort cases, especially mass tort cases. Northeastern University law professor Stephen Subrin and colleagues questions the value of making plaintiffs file in their own state, echoing Sotomayor. He further wonders if the majority's alleged cause of "interstate federalism" was sufficient justification for a verdict that strongly favored well-resourced companies over injured plaintiffs.

Berkeley Law professor Andrew Bradt writes that the decision does much to favor companies, by further hindering class action and mass-joinder suits (to which the federal judiciary is already quite hostile). He goes on to add that unfortunately the decision has still not clarified the extremely complex subject of personal jurisdiction.

University of Mississippi professor Michael Hoffheimer cites the case as one of six that have been part of a "stealth revolution" around personal jurisdiction. He argues that the Court, under the guise of following precedent, has actually greatly changed the law at the expense of plaintiffs and in the name of lessening the power of the courts. He argues that this does not solve the underlying problem: that personal jurisdiction remains one of the hardest to understand and apply aspects of American law. Hoffheimer believes the Court's actions are an ill-informed attack on the legitimacy of lower courts, which reduces public trust in them.

Richard D. Freer of Emory University also cites the case as one of six Supreme Court cases that have greatly changed personal jurisdiction, starting in 2011 after a 21-year hiatus on personal jurisdiction cases. He emphasizes that the Court has devalued judicial discretion, and notes that the Court's actions in the six cases have been extensively criticized by legal scholars.

== See also ==
- Daimler AG v. Bauman
- Ford Motor Co. v. Montana Eighth Judicial Dist.
