= Hall v. Decuir =

1878 US Supreme Court case

- Supreme Court of the United States

Argued April 17, 1877 Decided January 14, 1878
- Full case name: Hall v. Decuir
- Citations: 95 U.S. 485 (more)

Court membership
- Chief Justice Morrison Waite Associate Justices Nathan Clifford · Noah H. Swayne; Samuel F. Miller · Stephen J. Field; William Strong · Joseph P. Bradley; Ward Hunt · John M. Harlan

Case opinions
- Majority: Waite, joined by Swayne, Miller, Strong, Bradley, Hunt, Harlan, Field
- Concurrence: Clifford

Laws applied
- Commerce Clause

Hall v. Decuir, 95 U.S. 485 (1878), was a decision of the Supreme Court of the United States. In Hall, Josephine Decuir, a wealthy woman designated a Creole, sued for racial discrimination she experienced on a steamboat. She was traveling from New Orleans to Pointe Coupee Parish, where she owned a sugar plantation.

The Supreme Court held that the Louisiana statute authorizing a damages award to Decuir unconstitutionally interfered with interstate commerce. The majority opinion, by Morrison Waite, sought to avoid conflicting state laws with regard to interstate transit. Joseph W. Singer argues that Hall marked the beginning of a phase in Supreme Court jurisprudence that led to Plessy v. Ferguson.

== Background ==
Josephine Decuir née Dubuclet, who was designated a Creole, and her husband Antoine, were members of the Black elite in the antebellum South. The two had married in 1835. Their family were among the wealthiest Black people in the nation. The family lived in Pointe Coupee Parish in south central Louisiana, where they held a vast plantation. Before the American Civil War, the family had owned over 100 slaves. They were accustomed to traveling in first class on the Mississippi River from Hermitage up to Vicksburg or down to New Orleans. Decuir lived in France during the Civil War, and her husband died near its end. Decuir was much less wealthy after the Civil War, selling some of her land. She returned to Pointe Coupee with the intent of settling her husband's estate in 1866. She attempted to visit the ladies' cabin, but was instructed to return to her isolated cabin. According to the captain, Decuir "was in tears and crying" and objected to the treatment, noting that in France she was treated "like a white lady".

In July 1872, she left New Orleans for Point Coupee to consult the lawyers E. K. Washington and Seymour Snaer regarding her husband's estate. Decuir had purchased a first class ticket for $5. When Decuir reached the Governor Allen, she was denied access to a first class cabin—they were "specifically set aside for white persons"—and instead sent to the steerage, or second-class, cabins that were poorly ventilated and also known as the "colored department".

She did not accept the request, and sat in a chair in a recess for the night.

== Case ==
Decuir's lawyers, Washington and Snaer, filed a lawsuit against the steamboat's captain, John C. Benson, shortly after the trip. In Decuir v. Benson she argued her treatment constituted a constitutional violation and "indignity to her personality". Article XIII of the 1868 Constitution of Louisiana specifically prohibited race-based discrimination on transportation. The Eighth District Court of Orleans Parish ruled in her favor, awarding $1,000 in damages. Benson appealed, criticizing the amendment as violating the Commerce Clause in the United States Constitution and the Fourteenth Amendment, which guaranteed him a right to liberty and property. The Louisiana Supreme Court, led by John T. Ludeling, affirmed the decision of the lower court, noting that the state's 1869 civil rights act was "enacted solely to protect the newly enfranchised citizens of the United States, within the limits of Louisiana, from prejudice against them." William Gillespie Wyly dissented, considering the law a violation of the Commerce Clause.

John C. Benson died, but Eliza Jane Hall, who was responsible for the execution of his estate, appealed to the Supreme Court of the United States (SCOTUS). The case was argued on April 17, 1877. SCOTUS decided the case in October and announced it on January 14 the following year.

The SCOTUS reversed the decisions of the lower courts. The decision was unanimous. The majority opinion, by the Chief Justice of the United States, Morrison Waite, sought to avoid conflicting state laws with regard to interstate transit, and held that Louisiana civil rights law unconstitutionally interfered with the federal power over interstate commerce, as the Mississippi was an inter-state waterway and the General Allen, which was federally licensed, occasionally left the state. Indeed, while Decuir was only travelling to Pointe Coupee Parish, the steamship's route went to Vicksburg. SCOTUS concluded that "If the public good requires such legislation, it must come from Congress and not from the States." This ignored the Civil Rights Act of 1875, which guaranteed equal access on transportation. Nathan Clifford wrote a lengthy concurrence to the decision—more than six times as long as Waite's decision—that went into more depth in supporting it.

== Legacy ==
The case was the first the Supreme Court heard on segregation in common carriers after the Civil War ended. Joseph W. Singer argues that Hall marked the beginning of a phase in Supreme Court jurisprudence that led to Plessy v. Ferguson. According to historian Mia Bay, the case "all but endorsed segregation". Jack M. Beermann analyzed the case along with United States v. Cruikshank and noted that the two "signaled the Court's determination to aid in the suppression of the movement for racial justice and reinforce preexisting social and racial hierarchies." According to Charles A. Lofgren, the case "federalized" a decision that the Supreme Court of Pennsylvania had reached in West Chester and Philadelphia Railroad Company v. Miles (1867) and "in a very real sense, constitutionalized it as well".

After World War II, the Supreme Court used the precedent of Hall to declare segregation laws within states unconstitutional as they affected interstate commerce.

== Bibliography ==
- Bay, Mia (March 23, 2021). Traveling Black: A Story of Race and Resistance. Harvard University Press. ISBN 978-0-674-97996-3.
- Beermann, Jack M. (March 2020). "Crisis? Whose Crisis?". William & Mary Law Review. 61: 953.
- Harris, Cheryl I. (2005). "In the Shadow of Plessy". University of Pennsylvania Journal of Constitutional Law. 7 (3): 873–874. Archived from the original on October 7, 2014.
- Lofgren, Charles A. (1987). The Plessy case : a legal-historical interpretation. Oxford University Press. ISBN 978-0-19-503852-1.
- Scott, Rebecca J. (August 2020). "Discerning a Dignitary Offense: The Concept of Equal 'Public Rights' during Reconstruction". Law and History Review. 38 (3): 519–553. doi:10.1017/S0738248020000255. ISSN 0738-2480. S2CID 229069585.
- Welke, Barbara Y. (1995). "When All the Women Were White, and All the Blacks Were Men: Gender, Class, Race, and the Road to Plessy, 1855–1914". Law and History Review. 13 (2): 261–316. doi:10.2307/743861. ISSN 1939-9022. JSTOR 743861. S2CID 145343778.
