= USS Etlah (1864) =

History

United States
- Name: USS Etlah
- Ordered: April 1863
- Laid down: 1864
- Commissioned: Never commissioned
- Fate: Sold, 12 September 1874

General characteristics
- Class & type: Casco-class monitor
- Displacement: 1,175 long tons (1,194 t)
- Length: 225 ft (69 m)
- Beam: 45 ft (14 m)
- Draft: 9 ft (2.7 m)
- Propulsion: Screw
- Speed: 9 knots (10 mph; 17 km/h)
- Complement: 69 officers and enlisted
- Armament: 2 × 11 in (280 mm) smoothbore Dahlgren guns
- Armor: Turret: 8 in (200 mm); Pilothouse: 10 in (250 mm); Hull: 3 in (76 mm); Deck: 3 in (76 mm)

USS Etlah, a single-turreted, twin-screw monitor, was still under construction at St. Louis, Missouri, at the close of the American Civil War. A Casco-class, light-draft monitor, she was intended for service in the shallow bays, rivers, and inlets of the Confederacy. These warships sacrificed armor plate for a shallow draft and were fitted with a ballast compartment designed to lower them in the water during battle.

Though the original designs for the Casco-class monitors were drawn by John Ericsson, the final revision was created by Chief Engineer Alban B. Simers following Rear Admiral Samuel F. Du Pont's failed bombardment of Fort Sumter in 1863. By the time the plans were put before the Monitor Board in New York, NY, Ericsson and Simers had a poor relationship and Chief of the Bureau of Construction and Repair John Lenthall had little connection to the board. This resulted in the plans being approved and 20 vessels ordered without serious scrutiny of the new design. $14 million US was allocated for the construction of these vessels. It was discovered that Simers had failed to compensate for the armor his revisions added to the original plan and this resulted in excessive stress on the wooden hull frames and a freeboard of only 3 inches. Simers was removed from the control of the project and Ericsson was called in to undo the damage. He was forced to raise the hulls of the monitors under construction by 22 inches to make them seaworthy.

The entire class was considered a disappointment, and Etlah was laid up at one or another location until sold 12 September 1874. Between 15 June and 10 August 1869, she bore the name Hecate while being laid up at Mound City, IL.

== See also ==
- Chouteau v. United States, a United States Supreme Court case holding that the government was not liable for increased costs attributable to the delay for work that was not changed during the delay.
