= BNSF Railway Co. v. Tyrrell =

- Supreme Court of the United States

Argued April 25, 2017 Decided May 20, 2017
- Full case name: BNSF Railway Co., Petitioner v. Kelli Tyrrell, special administrator for the Estate of Brent T. Tyrrell, Deceased, et al.
- Docket no.: 16-405
- Citations: 581 U.S. 402 (more) 137 S. Ct. 1549; 198 L. Ed. 2d 36; 85 U.S.L.W. 4286
- Argument: Oral argument
- Reargument: Reargument
- Opinion announcement: Opinion announcement

Case history
- Prior: 2016 MT 126, 383 Mont. 417, 373 P. 3d 1

Holding
- A state court does not have personal jurisdiction over a railroad that is neither incorporated in nor headquartered in the state, on a claim that does not arise from an occurrence within the state, even though the railroad has extensive trackage and many employees in the state

Court membership
- Chief Justice John Roberts Associate Justices Anthony Kennedy · Clarence Thomas; Ruth Bader Ginsburg · Stephen Breyer; Samuel Alito · Sonia Sotomayor; Elena Kagan · Neil Gorsuch

Case opinions
- Majority: Ginsburg, joined by Roberts, Kennedy, Thomas, Breyer, Alito, Kagan, Gorsuch
- Concur/dissent: Sotomayor

Laws applied
- U.S. Const. amend. XIV

BNSF Railway Co. v. Tyrrell, 581 U.S. 402, 137 S. Ct. 1549 (2017), was a United States Supreme Court case in which the Court held that the Montana courts lacked personal jurisdiction over a railroad that was not incorporated in Montana and did not have its principal place of business in Montana, even though the railroad had more than 2,000 miles of track and 2,000 employees within Montana. It was the first Supreme Court case argued before a Court that included newly appointed Associate Justice Neil Gorsuch.

== Background ==
This case arose from two separate Federal Employers' Liability Act (FELA) actions involving employees of the BNSF Railway Company. The first action was brought by a North Dakota resident who claimed to have been injured while working as a truck driver for BNSF. The second action was commenced by the executor of a South Dakota resident who allegedly died following exposure to toxic substances while working for BNSF. Both plaintiffs filed their lawsuits in a Montana state court, although neither of the plaintiffs resided in Montana and the events underlying their cases did not take place in Montana.

BNSF moved to dismiss both lawsuits for lack of personal jurisdiction. The issue reached the Supreme Court of Montana, which sustained jurisdiction on two alternative grounds. First, the court concluded that personal jurisdiction over the railroad was authorized under Section 56 of FELA, which provides that a FELA action "may be brought in a district court of the United States, in the district of the residence of the defendant, or in which the cause of action arose, or in which the defendant shall be doing business at the time of commencing such action," and that "[t]he jurisdiction of the courts of the United States under this chapter shall be concurrent with that of the courts of the several States." Second, the court concluded that Montana could also exercise personal jurisdiction because BNSF had substantial operations in Montana, to the extent that it could be deemed "at home" in Montana for jurisdictional purposes.

BNSF sought U.S. Supreme Court review, contending that the first prong of the Montana Supreme Court's decision misconstrued FELA and the second was inconsistent with the U.S. Supreme Court's 2014 decision in Daimler AG v. Bauman. The U.S. Supreme Court granted certiorari in order "to resolve whether [FELA] §56 authorizes state courts to exercise personal jurisdiction over railroads doing business in their States but not incorporated or headquartered there, and whether the Montana courts’ exercise of personal jurisdiction in these cases comports with due process." The case was argued on April 25, 2017.

== Opinion of the Court ==
On May 30, 2017, Justice Ruth Bader Ginsburg delivered the Court's opinion, which was joined by all but one of the Justices. The Court reversed the Montana Supreme Court's decision and held that Montana could not properly exercise personal jurisdiction over BNSF in these two cases.

Rejecting the Montana court's conclusion that personal jurisdiction could be based upon Section 56 of FELA, the Court held that Section 56 does not relate to personal jurisdiction. Rather, the first cited sentence of Section 56 governs selection of the venue in FELA cases brought in federal courts, and the next sentence confers concurrent subject-matter jurisdiction over FELA cases on state as well as federal courts. Section 56 did not establish a special rule for personal jurisdiction over railroads or other defendants subject to FELA claims.

The Court also concluded that Montana could not exercise personal jurisdiction over BNSF, on claims that did not arise in Montana, consistent with the federal Constitution as the Court had interpreted it in Daimler. The Court's decision in that case establishes that a state may exercise "general" personal jurisdiction over a corporation if the corporation is "at home" in that state. A corporation is deemed to be at home in its state of incorporation and the state in which it maintains its principal place of business, but BNSF is incorporated in Delaware and has its principal place of business in Texas. While Daimler recognized that a corporation might be found to be "at home" and subject to general jurisdiction in another state in "exceptional circumstances," there were no such circumstances here.

The employees also contended that BNSF had consented to personal jurisdiction in Montana. Because the Montana Supreme Court had not addressed this issue, the Court remanded the case to allow it to do so.

== Concurring/dissenting opinion ==
Justice Sonia Sotomayor wrote a separate opinion, concurring in part and dissenting in part. Justice Sotomayor agreed with the majority that Section 56 of FELA is not relevant to personal jurisdiction. However, she concluded that the Montana state courts could exercise jurisdiction over BNSF consistent with due process. Sotomayor continued to disagree with the Court's holding in Daimler, in which she had filed an opinion concurring in the judgment but disagreeing with the majority's reasoning, believing that the International Shoe Co. v. Washington standard should govern the inquiry. However, even if Daimler was correctly decided, the Montana courts should still have jurisdiction. At a minimum, she concluded, the Court should allow the Montana Supreme Court to reevaluate whether this case satisfies the "exceptional circumstances" test.
