= Mobile Life Insurance Co. v. Brame =

Mobile Life Insurance Company v. Brame
- Supreme Court of the United States

Decided January 21, 1878
- Full case name: Mobile Life Insurance Company v. Brame
- Citations: 95 U.S. 754 (more) 24 L. Ed. 580; 1877 U.S. LEXIS 2230; 5 Otto 754

Court membership
- Chief Justice Morrison Waite Associate Justices Nathan Clifford · Noah H. Swayne; Samuel F. Miller · Stephen J. Field; William Strong · Joseph P. Bradley; Ward Hunt · John M. Harlan

Case opinion
- Majority: Hunt, joined by unanimous

Mobile Life Insurance Company v. Brame, 95 U.S. 754 (1877), is a United States Supreme Court case in which the Court held that the remedies available under the Louisiana code for manslaughter were not available under the common law.

== Statutes in question ==
The Revised Civil Code of Louisiana contains the following articles:

- ART. 2314. Every act whatever of man that causes damage to another, obliges him by whose fault it happened to repair it; the right of this action shall survive, in case of death, in favor of the minor children and widow of the deceased, or either of them, and in default of these, in favor of the surviving father or mother, or either of them, for the space of one year from the death.
- ART. 2316. Every person is responsible for the damage he occasions, not merely by his act, but by his negligence, his imprudence, or his want of skill.
- ART. 2324. He who causes another person to do an unlawful act, or assists or encourages in the commission of it, is answerable in solido with that person for the damage caused by such act.
