= Chouteau v. United States =

- Supreme Court of the United States

Decided November 5, 1877
- Full case name: Chouteau v. United States
- Citations: 95 U.S. 61 (more)

Holding
- In the absence of a contract clause promising that the government will pay increased costs attributed to a government delay for unmodified work, there is no basis for requiring the government to pay such an increase.

Court membership
- Chief Justice Morrison Waite Associate Justices Nathan Clifford · Noah H. Swayne; Samuel F. Miller · Stephen J. Field; William Strong · Joseph P. Bradley; Ward Hunt

Case opinion
- Majority: Miller, joined by unanimous

Chouteau v. United States, 95 U.S. 61 (1877), was a United States Supreme Court case in which the court held that, in the absence of a contract clause promising that the government will pay increased costs attributed to a government delay for unmodified work, there is no basis for requiring the government to pay such an increase.

== Background ==
In cases such as United States v. Speed, 75 U.S. 77 (1868), and Clark v. United States, 73 U.S. 543 (1867), the Supreme Court had held that the government did not have the right to interfere with the work of a government contractor after executing the contract. However, the contracts in those earlier cases did not reserve a right for the government to make changes, which is now called a "changes clause." Whether the government could reserve such a right for itself remained an open question in 1877.

The case was about a delay caused to the construction of the USS Etlah, a Casco-class monitor warship ordered in July 1863 as an eight-month project to be completed by Charles W. McCord. There were frequent improvements to the monitor design inspired by battles against ironclads at the time, so the contract for the construction of the Etlah contained this clause:

It is further agreed, that the parties of the second part [the Government] shall have the privilege of making alterations and additions to the plans and specifications at any time during the progress of the work, as they may deem necessary and proper, and if said alterations and additions cause extra expense to the parties of the first part [the contractor], they will pay for the same at fair and reasonable rates.

The work stoppages ordered by the government caused the ship to be completed in November 1865, 18 months late. The cost of labor had increased significantly in the interim, and the government reimbursed McCord only for the difference related to work that the government had changed. The delays of the Casca-class design caused huge cost overruns and a public scandal.

McCord sued in the United States Court of Claims, claiming that the delays were a breach of contract. The court found no breach and decided in the government's favor. It held that the contract provided the government with a privilege to order changes and reasoned that the government would be liable for delay costs only if it abused its privilege, such as by taking an unreasonably long time to order the changes. It ruled that the changes in this case were made within a reasonable period, so there was no abuse that justified recovery by McCord.

McCord had gone bankrupt by this time, so the person who appealed the case to the Supreme Court was his assignee, Chouteau.

== Opinion of the court ==
The Supreme Court issued an opinion on November 5, 1877.

The Supreme Court's decision made no mention of whether the length of the delay was reasonable. Instead, it was based on the language in the changes clause, which only contemplated cost increases for changed work.

== Later developments ==
The doctrine that the government is not automatically liable for increased costs due to delays is called the Rice doctrine. It is based on Chouteau and three other cases: United States v. Rice, 317 U.S. 61 (1942); Crook v. United States, 270 U.S. 4 (1926); and United States v. Foley, 329 U.S. 64 (1946). The doctrine is widely followed by appellate courts considering this sort of issue.
