= Shaffer v. Heitner =

- Supreme Court of the United States

Argued February 22, 1977 Decided June 17, 1977
- Full case name: Shaffer, et al. v. Heitner
- Citations: 433 U.S. 186 (more) 97 S. Ct. 2569; 53 L. Ed. 2d 683; 1977 U.S. LEXIS 139

Case history
- Prior: Appeal from the Supreme Court of Delaware

Holding
- The mere ownership of property in a state is not a sufficient contact to subject the property owner to a lawsuit in that state, unless that property is the subject of the lawsuit.

Court membership
- Chief Justice Warren E. Burger Associate Justices William J. Brennan Jr. · Potter Stewart; Byron White · Thurgood Marshall; Harry Blackmun · Lewis F. Powell Jr. William Rehnquist · John P. Stevens

Case opinions
- Majority: Marshall, joined by Burger, Stewart, White, Blackmun
- Concurrence: Powell
- Concurrence: Stevens
- Concur/dissent: Brennan
- Rehnquist took no part in the consideration or decision of the case.
- This case overturned a previous ruling or rulings
- Harris v. Balk (1905)

Shaffer v. Heitner, 433 U.S. 186 (1977), is a United States corporate law case in which the Supreme Court of the United States established that a defendant's ownership of stock in a corporation incorporated within a state, without more, is insufficient to allow that state's courts to exercise jurisdiction over the defendant. The case set forth a framework for evaluating when a defendant will be deemed to have minimum contacts with the forum state sufficient for the exercise of jurisdiction to be consistent with due process under the Fourteenth Amendment.

== Facts ==
Arnold Heitner, who as trustee owned one share of stock in Greyhound Corporation, a Delaware corporation, instituted a shareholder’s derivative suit in the Delaware Court of Chancery against 28 of the company's directors and officers. Most of these individuals resided outside Delaware. To secure jurisdiction over these defendants, at the outset of the litigation Heitner filed a motion for an order to "sequester" the shares of Greyhound stock owned by the defendants, meaning that they would be unable to sell the stock. The defendants were notified by certified mail and by publication of a legal notice in a newspaper.

By sequestering defendants' property, Delaware sought to exercise quasi in rem jurisdiction over the defendants. The defendants at issue were not subject to personal jurisdiction because they did not reside in Delaware and had not taken any actions in Delaware that were the subject matter of the lawsuit. However, because Delaware law deemed all stock in Delaware corporations to have a situs within the state, Delaware exercised jurisdiction over the stock itself. The defendants then had the choice of either filing an appearance in the lawsuit, thereby subjecting themselves to jurisdiction, or failing to appear to defend themselves, thus risking losing their stock.

The defendants responded by entering a special appearance in the Delaware court for the purpose of moving to quash service of process and to vacate the sequestration order, thus contesting Delaware's exercise of jurisdiction over them. They contended that none of them had ever set foot in Delaware or conducted any activities in that state. They contended that the ex parte sequestration procedure did not accord them due process of law as required by the Fourteenth Amendment, as construed by Supreme Court cases defining the requirements of personal jurisdiction, and that exercising quasi in rem jurisdiction over property in the forum state that was unrelated to the subject-matter of the litigation was constitutionally impermissible.

As the Supreme Court explained:

The Delaware state court found that it had quasi in rem jurisdiction, based on a Delaware statute that declared stock owned in a Delaware corporation to be legally located 'in' Delaware. The primary purpose of 'sequestration' is not to secure possession of property pending a trial between resident debtors and creditors on the issue of who has the right to retain it. On the contrary, as here employed, 'sequestration' is a process used to compel the personal appearance of a nonresident defendant to answer and defend a suit brought against him in a court of equity. It is accomplished by the appointment of a sequestrator by this Court to seize and hold property of the nonresident located in this State subject to further Court order. If the defendant enters a general appearance, the sequestered property is routinely released, unless the plaintiff makes special application to continue its seizure, in which event the plaintiff has the burden of proof and persuasion. [Citations removed]

The defendants sought review by the United States Supreme Court, which granted certiorari.

== Decision ==
=== Opinion of the court ===
In an opinion written by Justice Thurgood Marshall, the Court determined that the minimum contacts rule of International Shoe Co. v. Washington applies to actions brought in rem as well as to ordinary "in personam" actions. Justice Marshall theorized that in rem actions would remain mostly unaffected by the ruling but "Type 2" quasi in rem actions (actions seizing property for the purpose of settling a dispute unrelated to that property) would be greatly affected because the mere ownership of property in a state is not a sufficient contact to subject the property owner to a lawsuit in that state, unless that property is the issue of the lawsuit. The state in which property is located will still generally have personal jurisdiction over disputes concerning the ownership of property within that state, because the owner will be receiving the benefits and protections of that state, while the state will have a strong interest in the peaceful resolution of disputes, and records and witnesses will probably be located therein.

Heitner argued that Delaware's interest in controlling the behavior of its corporations justified its assertion of personal jurisdiction over the defendants. The Court responded that this could be a reason to apply Delaware law in resolving the dispute, but that this did not need to take place in a Delaware forum.

=== Concurring opinions ===
Justices Lewis Powell and John Paul Stevens each authored concurring opinions. Both agreed with the outcome in this case, but differed on the question of whether the analysis would be the same if the property in question was real estate instead of stock. Powell would reserve judgment on whether ownership of real property would constitute minimum contacts. Stevens saw no in rem jurisdiction for stocks because of the lack of notice to purchasers of securities that the purchase may subject them to such jurisdiction, but would not say the same for real estate.

=== Dissenting opinion ===
Justice William J. Brennan, Jr. wrote a dissenting opinion, largely concurring in the Court's method of analyzing the jurisdictional issue, but disagreeing with the ultimate result. Brennan agreed that International Shoe required a determination whether the defendants had at least minimum contacts sufficient to subject them to jurisdiction in Delaware. However, he would have held that defendants did have such contacts because the directors voluntarily associated themselves with Delaware by becoming directors of a Delaware corporation.

== See also ==
- United States corporate law
- List of United States Supreme Court cases, volume 433
- List of United States Supreme Court cases
- Lists of United States Supreme Court cases by volume
- List of United States Supreme Court cases by the Burger Court
