= Pennoyer v. Neff =

- Supreme Court of the United States

Argued October, 1877 Decided January 21, 1878
- Full case name: Sylvester Pennoyer v. Marcus Neff
- Citations: 95 U.S. 714 (more) 24 L. Ed. 565; 1877 U.S. LEXIS 2227

Case history
- Prior: Error to the Circuit Court of the United States for the District of Oregon

Holding
- No personal jurisdiction can be had over defendants who are physically absent from the state or have not consented to the court's jurisdiction; personal jurisdiction must comport with the Due Process Clause of the Fourteenth Amendment.

Court membership
- Chief Justice Morrison Waite Associate Justices Nathan Clifford · Noah H. Swayne; Samuel F. Miller · Stephen J. Field; William Strong · Joseph P. Bradley; Ward Hunt · John M. Harlan

Case opinions
- Majority: Field, joined by Waite, Clifford, Swayne, Miller, Strong, Bradley, Harlan
- Dissent: Hunt

Laws applied
- U.S. Const. Amend. XIV

Pennoyer v. Neff, 95 U.S. 714 (1878), was a decision by the Supreme Court of the United States in which the Court held that a state court can only exert personal jurisdiction over a party domiciled out-of-state if that party is served with process while physically present within the state. More importantly, the court imposed a procedural limit on quasi in rem jurisdiction over property located within the state; it would have to be "brought under the control of the court" at the time the suit commenced otherwise quasi in rem jurisdiction would remain unavailable.

The case emerged from a fee dispute between Marcus Neff, a homesteader in the Territory of Oregon, and attorney John H. Mitchell. Neff hired Mitchell to manage his application for a land patent under the Donation Land Claim Act of 1850 and Mitchell later accused Neff of failing to pay his fee. Although the existence of the debt was highly suspect, Mitchell successfully obtained a judgment by default and took title to Neff's homestead. Mitchell later assigned the land to Sylvester Pennoyer, future governor of Oregon. Pennoyer held the land for eight years before Neff sought it back. Pennoyer lost in every action against Neff in an attempt to regain his land, including his action in Federal Court which would reach the Supreme Court. Pennoyer was extremely embittered by the process, and carried his hatred for the Supreme Court into his political career. There is speculation that the unethical Mitchell may have falsified the original lawsuit, which may have itself emerged from an illegal deal between Mitchell and Neff. In the end, Pennoyer was left without recourse due to Mitchell's faults, and Neff recovered the land.

The legal issues of the case turned on whether the court in question could extend personal jurisdiction over a defendant who isn't present in the state. Though Neff had settled in Oregon originally, he had allegedly moved to California by the time of the lawsuit. The lower court narrowly ruled in Neff's favor, mostly based on Mitchell's untrustworthiness, but the Supreme Court turned the case into a sweeping treatise on personal jurisdiction. The Supreme Court's decision laid the groundwork for the complex common law of personal jurisdiction. It has been substantially modified in subsequent decisions, especially International Shoe Co. v. Washington (1945), but some parts remain. It is frequently taught to first year law students in the study of civil procedure.

== Background ==
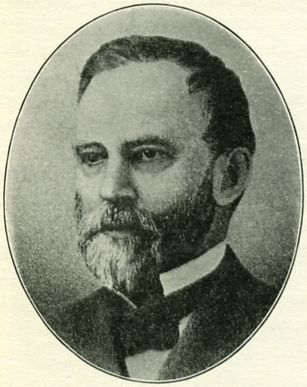
Sylvester Pennoyer, taken more than a decade later while he was governor of Oregon

The case included a colorful cast of characters attempting to build lives on the Oregon frontier. Marcus Neff (born 1826) had arrived in Oregon in 1848 after taking the Oregon Trail by wagon. He became one of the first men to speculate over land in Oregon. Neff sought a land grant under the Donation Law of Oregon, an act of the United States Congress enacted on September 27, 1850. The act provided an incentive for the development of land in the territories of the American West by conveying parcels of land to be used for further development. Single unmarried men, like Neff was at the time, could receive 320 acres (1.3 km^{2}) of free land. The law required that requests for land be made by December 1, 1850. Neff appears to have missed the actual deadline to apply, as his application stated December 15, but December had been crossed out and September 15 had been put in its place (a date before the law had been passed). So began the first of numerous frauds that surrounded the case.

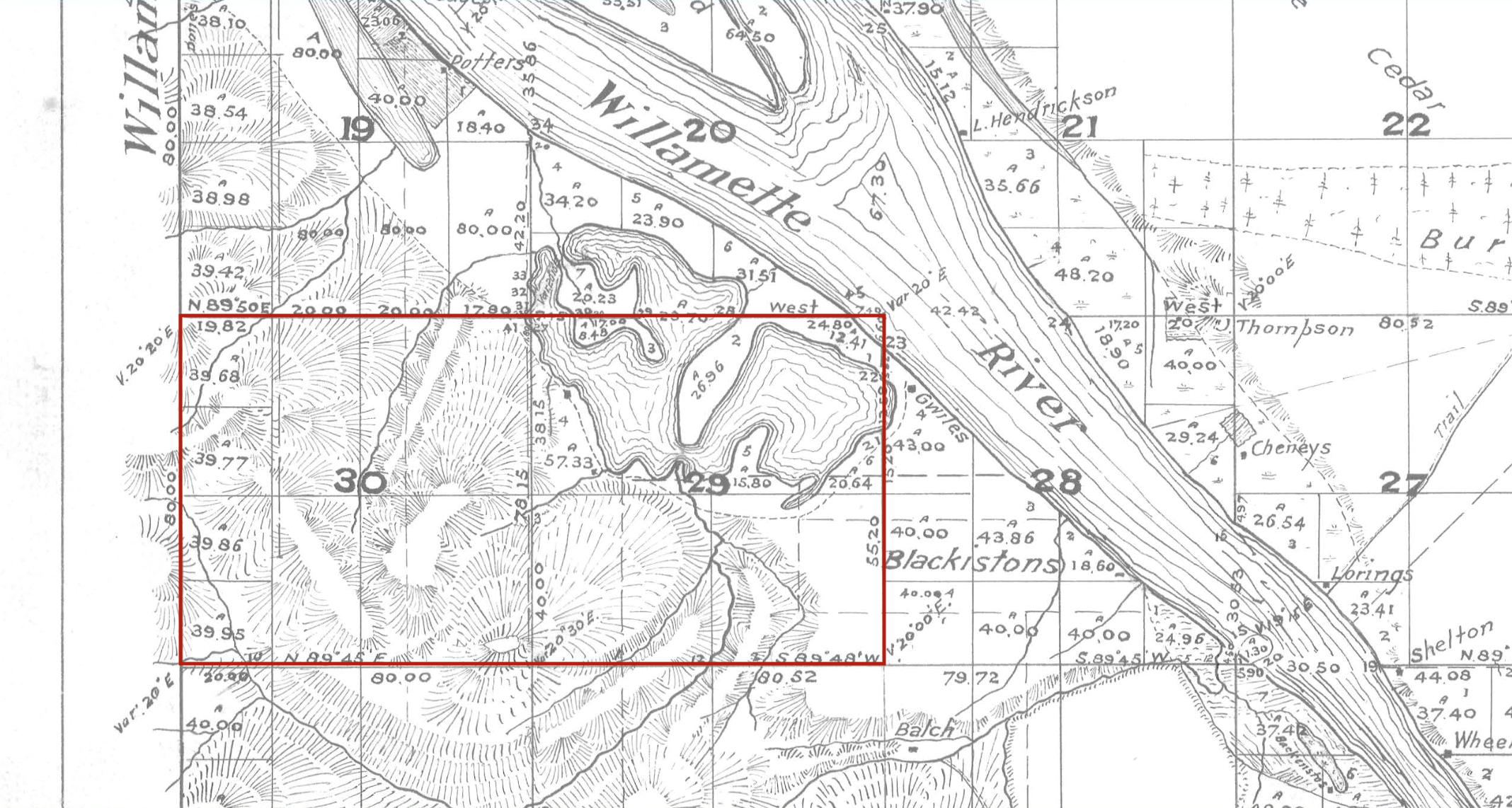
The approximate location of the parcel of land, along the Willamette river, in what is now downtown Portland

To gain title to the land, a settler had to work it for four years for their own use, and have two third parties sign affidavits that confirmed the land had been used properly and by the settler. Neff submitted one such affidavit in 1853 (too early), and another in 1856. The slow pace of frontier and government bureaucracy meant that the claim would not be fully processed for another decade. In an attempt to speed up the process and deal with the requisite paperwork, the illiterate Neff hired attorney John H. Mitchell.

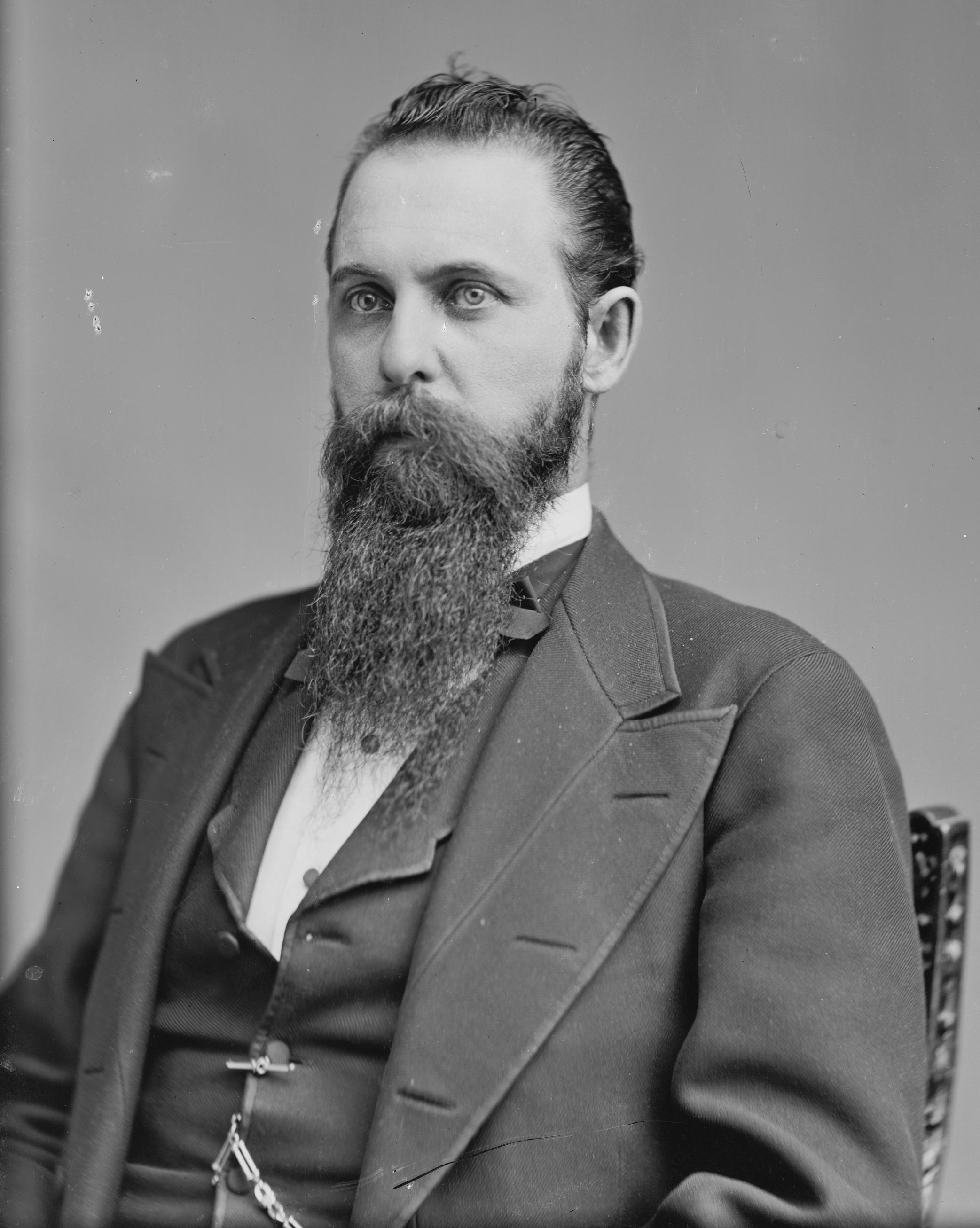
John H. Mitchell, the unscrupulous lawyer at the heart of the case. Taken sometime between 1865 and 1880.

Mitchell was a colorful character in his own right. Mitchell's real name was John Hipple, and he had come to Oregon after fleeing his 15 year old wife in Pennsylvania. He stopped in California to leave his lover whom he had run away with, and then settled in Oregon, remarrying without divorcing his first wife. Wendy Collins Purdue, dean of Richmond Law, provides a description for Mitchell as an unethical and unskilled lawyer who used his significant charisma to find success, both in lawyering and later in his political career. Mitchell was more than willing to defraud his own clients. In one case, he acted as a guardian on behalf of a widow, wherein he moved to sell some of her land to supposedly pay for the expenses of the guardianship, turned around and bought the land himself at a cheap price and then resold it at market value for a sizeable profit. In another action, a client came to Mitchell looking for help with debt. Mitchell instead informed the creditors of the client's location, and was appointed as the debt collector. Mitchell then extorted the money out of his now victimized client.

Neff was ultimately successful in procuring property on the ancestral homeland of the Multnomah Indian tribe in Multnomah County, Oregon. Neff however failed to pay Mitchell the $300 he was allegedly owed for his services. Whether Neff actually owed Mitchell the $300 is doubtable, given the poor ethics of Mitchell. Neff reportedly paid $6.05, a sizeable sum less than claimed. Although the work was rendered from 1862 into 1863, Mitchell waited until 1865 to sue, likely waiting until Neff was out of the state. Mitchell sued for $253.15 plus legal fees (some $4,300 in 2020, adjusted for inflation).

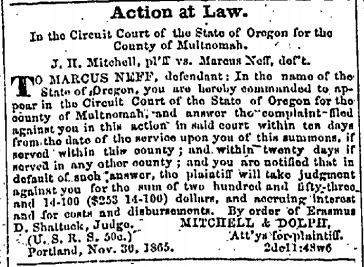
The contested newspaper notice in the Pacific Christian Advocate. Note the summons authorized by Judge Erasmus D. Shattuck.

Mitchell sued Neff in the Circuit Court of Multnomah County for the outstanding debt. Neff was supposedly not in Oregon at the time, and Mitchell ran a notice in a newspaper to notify Neff, thus giving service of process by publication. The effectiveness of this service was likely low, as it was run in the Pacific Christian Advocate, a niche religious publication. Whether Mitchell went to any effort at all to determine Neff's actual location is also doubtable. Mitchell claimed that Neff was in California. This was true at some point, as Neff did move to San Joaquin, California. However, Neff's own affidavit in another case regarding the same parcel (McGuire v. Neff) indicated that Neff may have been living in Oregon until 1870. Due to Mitchell's ineffective service, Neff did not appear in court to contest the matter, and thus Mitchell won the lawsuit by default judgment. Given that Mitchell asserted Neff was not physically in the state, he could not be sued in personam (a Judgment which may follow a defendant across state lines and is attached to his person). So to recoup his fee, Mitchell instead sought action in rem (in property): the piece of land he had helped Neff obtain, worth an alleged $15,000 (about $440,000 in 2020, adjusted for inflation). Though the lower court Judgment was issued in February 1866, Mitchell waited until July 22, 1866 to seek execution of the Judgment. This likely aligned with the arrival of Neff's land patent, which had been granted in March but likely took some months to travel to the frontier.

Neff's land was put up for auction, and sold by the sheriff for $341.60. Although the Supreme Court intimated that Sylvester Pennoyer had bought the land, it was in fact Mitchell himself who purchased the land, and then assigned it to Pennoyer a few days later. Pennoyer was an Oregon lawyer, active in land speculation and politics like Mitchell (though Mitchell was a Republican and Pennoyer a Democrat). Pennoyer ostensibly owned the property for the next eight years, used some of the land for timber, sold a portion, and paid the property taxes. Neff returned in 1874.

Neff appears to have harassed Pennoyer about the property, and Pennoyer sought to firm up his title twice. The original deed had been signed five months late and by a deputy sheriff instead, so Pennoyer had a new deed signed by the current sheriff. Then he had another deed signed by the man who had been sheriff at the time of the sale. Though Neff had been prosperous in California, the Oregon action was apparently important enough to move his entire family there for a year to get his land back. An extremely bitter series of actions followed, starting with Neff successfully having Pennoyer evicted. Pennoyer fought over the costs of the eviction, and lost again. Neff then sued Pennoyer for the damage to his land from the timbering operation and won again. The only small victory for Pennoyer was that the jury awarded effectively no damages. Pennoyer counterclaimed for the property taxes he paid, but he again lost. Pennoyer sought the land back in Federal Court, and again lost. He appealed this action to the Supreme Court, where he would face his final defeat.

=== Lower court ruling ===
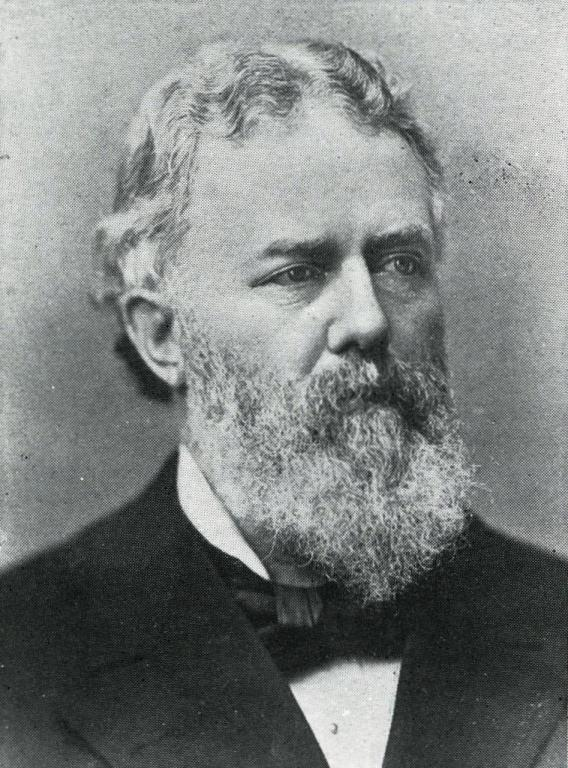
Judge Matthew Deady, who wrote the lower court decision

The decision of the United States District Court for the District of Oregon was made by Matthew Deady. His diaries have been preserved, and provide much information about his thoughts on the parties. He interacted with Mitchell and Pennoyer a fair amount, and had a negative view of each. However he held a much deeper dislike for Mitchell, whom he viewed as untrustworthy and immoral. Deady's diary entries concerning Mitchell (whom he started to refer to as Hipple) became increasingly acrimonious over the years, especially as Mitchell got deeper into politics. In 1873, Mitchell had been at the center of a corruption inquiry as part of his Senate election campaign. Mitchell characteristically escaped further investigation by bribing the attorney general at the time, George Henry Williams. Deady's disgust at the entire affair was well chronicled in his diary, and his total lack of trust in Mitchell's character was reflected in his decision.

Deady's narrow decision in favor of Neff is described by Dean Perdue as surprisingly modern, though quite conservative in its approach. Deady focuses mostly on due process. The Due Process Clause of the United States Constitution requires that defendants to a lawsuit be properly notified. In an ideal world, every defendant would be personally handed the summons of a lawsuit, but the expense and inefficiency of this method results in other options for giving notice. Mitchell, in his lawsuit, gave an affidavit that he didn't know the precise location of Neff. But Mitchell gave no detail as to what steps he had taken to ascertain this. Deady, likely motivated by Mitchell's reputation for untrustworthiness, singled out the lack of detail in the affidavit as evidence that Mitchell had in fact taken no action to diligently search for Neff. Only after a diligent search had failed should Mitchell have been allowed to publish notice in a newspaper. Deady further calls out Mitchell's choice of a regional religious newspaper as not giving appropriate notice. A newspaper not well read in Oregon, let alone outside of the state, could hardly be expected to reach Neff. Deady's narrow approach focusing on whether Mitchell had done his due diligence represented his poor view of Mitchell and the high likelihood of fraud in the case. Dean Perdue thinks that Deady's narrow, notice based approach would have also worked well at the Supreme Court, but the Supreme Court took up the case with broad issues in mind.

== Opinion of the court ==
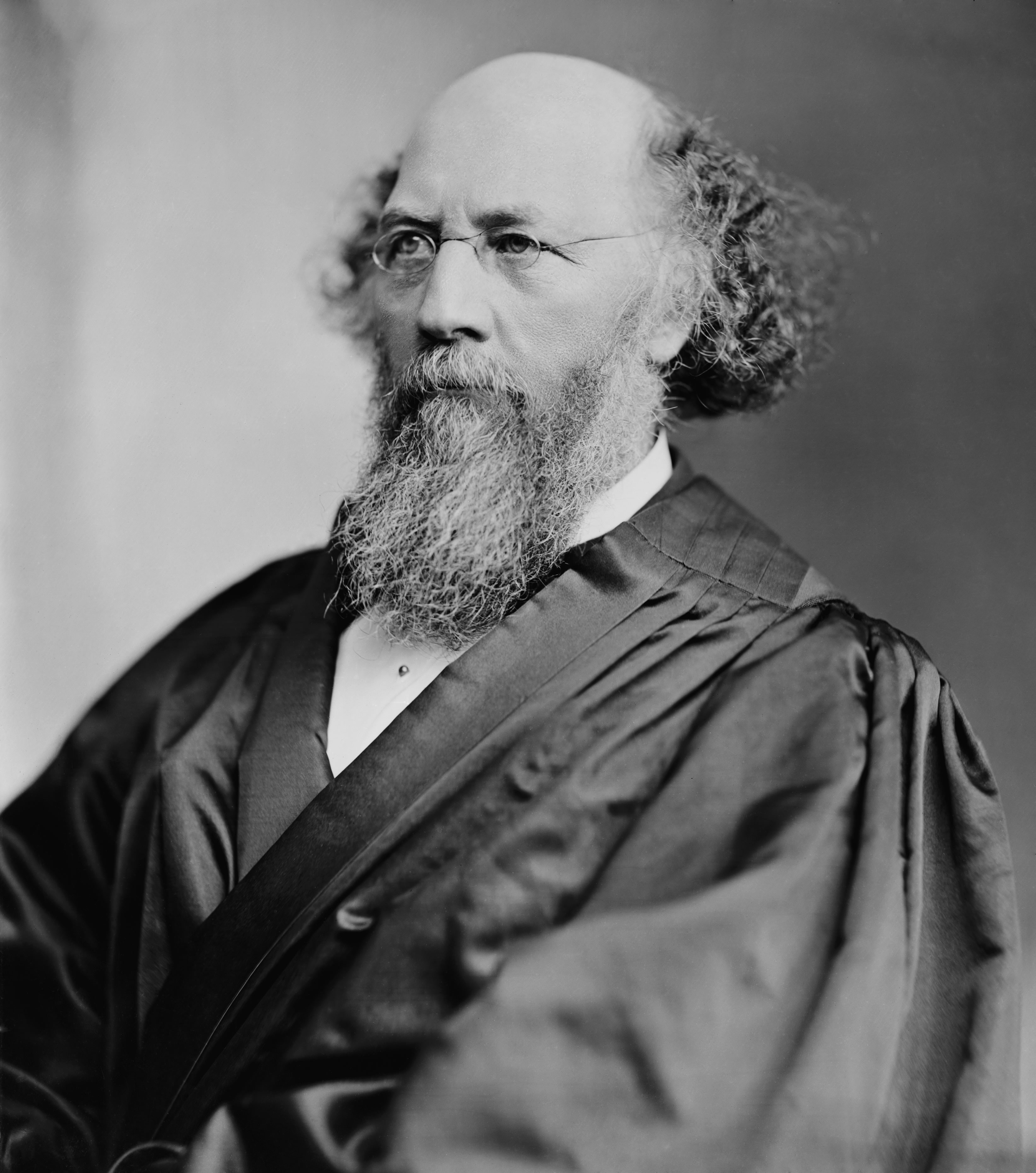
Justice Field, who authored the expansive and influential opinion for the Supreme Court

The Supreme Court ruled in favor of Neff, holding that for the trial court to have jurisdiction over the property, the property needed to be attached before the start of litigation, whereupon the trial court has quasi in rem jurisdiction. Mitchell had made the mistake of not attaching the parcel at the start of his action against Neff, instead waiting until after Judgment had been rendered. The Court then laid out a broad argument for limited personal jurisdiction.

Constructive notice as opposed to actual notice is insufficient under US law to inform a person living in another state, except for cases affecting the personal status of an American plaintiff (like divorce) or cases that are in rem, in which the property sought is within the boundaries of the state and the law presumes that property is always in the possession of the owner who therefore knows what happens to the property. Thus, attachment of the property before judicial proceedings makes constructive notice sufficient.

=== Dissent ===
Associate Justice Ward Hunt dissented. His chief concerns were that the decision would invite litigation, upend property law, and that it impinged on state sovereignty.

== Subsequent developments ==
=== Parties ===
Pennoyer was extremely embittered by his multiple losses, in a case where he had effectively done nothing wrong. The fault seemed to lie with Mitchell, but Pennoyer never recovered any damages from Mitchell, likely because the property had been conveyed via quitclaim deed without warranty. Pennoyer took his anger at the case and the Supreme Court into his political career. In his inaugural address upon being elected governor of Oregon, he railed against the Supreme Court and called for the justices to all be impeached, seeing the Supreme Court as a massive governmental overreach. He held especial rage for Chief Justice John Marshall, whom he termed the head of a judicial oligarchy that had supplanted democracy. Judge Deady felt the speech made a fool of Pennoyer, and that he had expected such buffoonery from Pennoyer.

Neff had also defended the property in an 1875 action from Mary McGuire (also spelled Maguire), who had bought a portion of it from Pennoyer and sought to quiet title. McGuire lost, and with the Pennoyer decision, Neff had full ownership of his land once more. Neff vanished into obscurity after the Supreme Court case. As of the 1880 census, Neff was still living in Oregon. Neff's land is now some of the most valuable in Portland, situated in the downtown area.

Mitchell's political career took him to the Senate from 1872–1879, and again in 1885. The 1885 election had an unusual connection to the case: the judge of the lower court, Matthew Deady, came into possession of Mitchell's love-letters from yet another affair. Mitchell's unexpected re-election, despite publication of the affair in The Oregonian, was decried by Deady. Mitchell would later be sentenced to six months in prison for his role in the Oregon land fraud scandal. Dean Purdue cites this as the climactic fraud of Mitchell's life, and wonders how far back his frauds went, speculating that the original claim against Neff emerged from a nefarious deal between Neff and Mitchell. Though Dean Purdue acknowledges that such things cannot be known, she further guesses that the discrepancy from the small fee paid and the large fee sought could also have been the result of a bribe paid by Mitchell to an official to speed up the processing of Neff's patent, which was a common practice at the time.

=== Basis for personal jurisdiction ===
Many aspects of the Court's ruling in this case have subsequently been overturned for cases in which personal or in personam jurisdiction is concerned. In a long series of United States Supreme Court jurisprudence following this ruling, the Court has modified the territorial analysis without overruling its holding. Indeed, it seems the basis of a state's authority to decide the "status" of its citizens, for example, as in a divorce without having personal jurisdiction over the respondent remains undisturbed.

The doctrines governing personal jurisdiction in the United States have spawned a great deal of discourse within the Supreme Court of the United States with many cases finetuning and elaborating upon the concept, which has led to the test used today, in which the overall scope of the test for determining whether a court may exert personal jurisdiction over a party has been expanded in certain respects but narrowed in others. Nevertheless, in every case, the Supreme Court has ruled that such analyses must comport with the Due Process Clause of the Fourteenth Amendment.

The 1945 case International Shoe Co. v. Washington mostly replaced the Pennoyer framework with the "minimum contacts" standard for personal jurisdiction.

=== In law schools ===
In law schools, Pennoyer is commonly taught in civil procedure classes. While scholars disagree as to the extent that federal legal procedure remains bound to its direct legacy, Pennoyer is an important sample of early jurisdictional jurisprudence.

== See also ==
- Calder v. Jones (1984)
- Hess v. Pawloski (1927)
