= Personal jurisdiction =

Court jurisdiction over the parties of a lawsuit

Personal jurisdiction is a court's jurisdiction over the parties, as determined by the facts in evidence, which bind the parties to a lawsuit, as opposed to subject-matter jurisdiction, which is jurisdiction over the law involved in the suit. Without personal jurisdiction over a party, a court's rulings or decrees cannot be enforced upon that party, except by comity; i.e., to the extent that the sovereign which has jurisdiction over the party allows the court to enforce them upon that party. A court that has personal jurisdiction has both the authority to rule on the law and facts of a suit and the power to enforce its decision upon a party to the suit. In some cases, territorial jurisdiction may also constrain a court's reach, such as preventing hearing of a case concerning events occurring on foreign territory between two citizens of the home jurisdiction. A similar principle is that of standing or locus standi, which is the ability of a party to demonstrate to the court sufficient connection to and harm from the law or action challenged to support that party's participation in the case.

== International principles ==
Since there is no world government which all countries recognize to arbitrate disputes over jurisdiction, sovereign powers can find themselves in conflict over which is the more appropriate venue to hear a case, or which country's laws should apply. These conflicts are sometimes resolved de facto by physical factors, such as which country has physical possession of a defendant or property, or sometimes by use of physical police or military force to seize people or property. A country with loose rule of law – for example an absolute monarchy with no independent judiciary – may arbitrarily choose to assert jurisdiction over a case without citing any particular justification. Such assertion can cause problems, such as encouraging other countries to take arbitrary actions over foreign citizens and property, or even provoking skirmishes or armed conflict.

In practice, many countries operate by one or another principle, either in written law or in practice, which communicate when the country will and will not assert jurisdiction:

- nationality principle – A country asserts jurisdiction over the conduct of its citizens, anywhere in the world.
- passive personality principle – A country asserts jurisdiction over acts committed against its citizens, anywhere in the world.
- protective principle – A country asserts jurisdiction over issues that affect its interests, such as conspiracies to overthrow its government, or resources critical to its economy (such as access to an international waterway)
- territorial principle – A country asserts jurisdiction over people, property, and events taking place on its own territory.
- treaty jurisdiction – An international treaty explicitly decides the issue.
- universal jurisdiction – A country asserts jurisdiction over certain acts committed by anyone, anywhere in the world. Usually reserved for exceptionally serious crimes, such as war crimes and crimes against humanity.

Different principles are applied by different countries, and different principles may be applied by the same country in different circumstances. Determination of whether or not a court has jurisdiction to hear a case is the first stage of a conflict of laws proceeding, potentially followed by choice of law to determine which jurisdiction's laws apply. Executive prosecutorial authority and foreign policy also play a role in scope and practical impact of jurisdiction choices.

Any assertion of jurisdiction based on anything other than the territorial principle is known as extraterritorial jurisdiction. Prosecution of a case against an out-of-territory defendant is known as assertion of long-arm jurisdiction.

When a person commits a crime in a foreign country against the laws of that country, usually the host country is responsible for prosecution. The Vienna Convention on Consular Relations requires that the host country notify the foreign embassy, potentially allowing the foreign country to assist in legal defense and monitor conditions of detention. (Most countries protect their citizens against foreign powers in general.)

Foreign diplomats enjoy diplomatic immunity in many countries based on the Vienna Convention on Diplomatic Relations or bilateral agreement, and foreign military personnel may be subject to the jurisdiction of their home country based on a status of forces agreement or Visiting Forces Agreement.

If a person is not physically present in the country which wishes to prosecute a case, that country may either wait until the person enters the national territory, or pursue extradition by legal or extralegal means, and with or without a general extradition treaty. Some countries (like China) prefer to prosecute their own citizens for crimes committed abroad rather than extradite them. Other countries defer to the host country.

When a crime is committed outside the territory of any country, such as in Antarctica, on watercraft in international waters, on aircraft in international airspace, and on spacecraft, jurisdiction is usually determined by the nationality of defendants or victims, or by the flag state of the vessel. This is determined by the admiralty law of the countries involved and in international agreements.

== History in English and U.S. law ==
The concept of personal jurisdiction in English law has its origin in the idea that a monarch could not exercise power over persons or property located outside of his or her kingdom. To some degree, this was a de facto rule; the monarch's men could not arrest people or seize property outside the kingdom without risking physical conflict with the soldiers and police of other kingdoms. Slowly this principle was incorporated into written law, but problems arose in cases where property owners could not be sued because they had left the kingdom or had died and therefore were not present within the kingdom at the time they were being sued. To solve this problem, the courts created another type of jurisdiction, called quasi in rem, that is, jurisdiction over the land itself, even if the person who owned the land was not in the country. However, this jurisdiction was limited to the settlement of debts owed by the owner of the land.

In the United States, the exercise of personal jurisdiction by a court must both comply with Constitutional limitations, and be authorized by a statute. In the United Kingdom, the exercise of personal jurisdiction does not need a statutory basis, since the United Kingdom does not have a written constitution.

== United States ==
The intersection of American federalism and the rules and theories of jurisdiction inherited from the common law of England has resulted in a highly complex body of law respecting personal jurisdiction in the United States. These rules limit both state and federal courts in their ability to hear cases.

=== Principles ===
Three fundamentals of personal jurisdiction constrain the ability of courts in the United States to bind individuals or property to its decisions: consent, power, and notice.

==== Consent ====
The American legal system is an adversarial system. Civil actions cannot be initiated by third parties, nor by the court itself sua sponte, but must be filed by the aggrieved party who seeks redress, the plaintiff. Generally, the action is initiated in the jurisdiction where the event occurred, where the defendant can be served or where the parties have agreed to have the case located. The filing of a complaint or prayer for relief is a voluntary action by the plaintiff, and as a necessary corollary to this, the plaintiff impliedly consents to be bound by the judgment of the court.

The doctrine of consent also applies to the person against whom relief is sought, the defendant. When a defendant responds to a civil action and actively litigates its merits without raising a timely objection to personal jurisdiction, that omission is treated as the defendant's implied consent to the jurisdiction of the court.

Consent may also derive from a pre-litigation agreement by the parties, such as a forum selection clause in a contract (not to be confused with a choice of law clause). Doctrines such as claim preclusion normally prevent re-litigation of failed claims or defenses in alternative forums. Claim preclusion does not, however, prevent the refiling of a claim that was originally filed in a court that lacked personal jurisdiction over the defendant.

==== Power ====
In cases where a defendant challenges personal jurisdiction, a court may still exercise personal jurisdiction if it has independent power to do so. This power is founded in the inherent nature of the State: sovereignty over secular affairs within its territory.

==== Notice ====
The Fifth and Fourteenth Amendment to the United States Constitution preserve the right of the individual to due process. Due process requires that notice be given in a manner "reasonably calculated" to inform a party of the action affecting him. Originally, "Notice" (and the power of the State) was often exercised more forcefully, the defendant in a civil case sometimes being seized and brought before the court under a writ of capias ad respondendum. Notice in such a case is inferred from consent of the defendant to go with the officer. Nowadays, when exercising power over an individual without consent, notice is usually given by formal delivery of suitable papers to the defendant (service of process).

=== Historical background: territorial jurisdiction ===
Originally, jurisdiction over parties in the United States was determined by strict interpretation of the geographic boundaries of each state's sovereign power. In Pennoyer v. Neff, the Supreme Court discussed that though each state ceded certain powers (e.g. foreign relations) to the Federal Government or to no entity at all (e.g. the powers that are eliminated by the protections of the bill of rights), the states retained all the other powers of sovereignty, including the exclusive power to regulate the affairs of individuals and property within its territory. Necessarily following from this, one state's exercise of power could not infringe upon the sovereignty of another state. Thus, Constitutional limitations applied to the validity of state court judgments.

Three types of jurisdiction developed, collectively termed territorial jurisdiction because of their reliance upon territorial control: in personam jurisdiction, in rem jurisdiction, and quasi in rem jurisdiction. Some sources refer to all three types of territorial jurisdiction as personal jurisdiction, since most actions against property (in rem jurisdiction) bear, in the end, upon the rights and obligations of persons. Others continue to recognize the traditional distinction between personal jurisdiction and jurisdiction over property, even after Shaffer v. Heitner (discussed below).

In personam jurisdiction referred to jurisdiction over a particular person (or entity, such as a company). In personam jurisdiction, if held by a state court, permitted that court to rule upon any case over which it otherwise held jurisdiction. Under territorial jurisdiction, pure in personam jurisdiction could only be established by serving notice upon the individual while that individual was within the territory of the state.

In rem jurisdiction referred to jurisdiction over a particular piece of property, most commonly real estate or land. Certain cases, notably government suits for unpaid property taxes, proceed not against an individual but against their property directly. Under territorial jurisdiction, in rem jurisdiction could be exercised by the courts of a state by seizing the property in question. Since an actual tract of land could not literally be brought into a courtroom as a person could, this was effected by giving notice upon the real property itself. In rem jurisdiction was thus supported by the assumption that the owner of that property, having a concrete economic interest in the property, had a duty to look after the affairs of their property, and would be notified of the pending case by such seizure. In rem jurisdiction was limited to deciding issues regarding the specific property in question.

Quasi in rem jurisdiction involved the seizure of property held by the individual against whom the suit was brought, and attachment of that property to the case in question. This form of territorial jurisdiction developed from the rationale of in rem jurisdiction, namely that seizure of the property was reasonably calculated to inform an individual of the proceedings against them.

Once a valid judgment was obtained against an individual, however, the plaintiff could pursue recovery against the assets of the defendant regardless of their location, as other states were obligated by the Full Faith and Credit Clause of the Constitution to recognize such a judgment (i.e. had ceded their power to refuse comity to fellow states of the Union). Violations by a rogue state could be checked via collateral attack: when a plaintiff sought recovery against a defendant's assets in another state, that state could refuse judgment on the grounds that the original judgment was invalid.

==== Difficulties in applying Pennoyer territorial jurisdiction ====
Following Pennoyer, extreme applications of territorial jurisdiction revealed imperfections in the doctrine, and societal changes began to present new problems as the United States' national economy became more integrated by increasingly efficient multi-state transportation technology and business practices.

While determining the physical location of an individual for the purposes of in personam jurisdiction was easy enough, applying the same principle to non-physical entities became difficult. Courts were presented with the question of where a company was present and amenable to service for the purpose of in personam jurisdiction over the company.

Extension of quasi in rem jurisdiction led to extreme results that threatened the justification for the jurisdiction. Bearing in mind that territorial jurisdiction existed in a pre-industrial society where transportation across the country was difficult, long, and potentially treacherous, and consider the hypothetical wherein Alice owes Bob money, and Bob owes Carmel, a resident of New York, money. Carmel seeks to recover on Bob's debt to Carmel, however cannot do so because Bob avoids Carmel by traveling to California. Alice, however, happens to travel through New York. Carmel serves notice upon Alice, and attaches Alice's debt to Bob (considered to be property within the state) to the proceeding. Alice can no more certainly provide notice to Bob in California than Carmel could provide, and the transient and involuntary exposure of Bob to being hauled into court in New York by this attachment seems to erode the original rationale of quasi in rem jurisdiction.

The US Supreme Court largely abolished the exercise of jurisdiction on the basis of quasi in rem in Shaffer v. Heitner, except in exceptional circumstances, which sometimes would arise while dealing with real property such as land, and when the owner of the land cannot be found.

=== Modern Constitutional doctrine: International Shoe doctrine ===
In the modern era, the reach of personal jurisdiction has been expanded by judicial re-interpretation and legislative enactments. Under the new and current doctrine, a state court may only exert personal jurisdiction over an individual or entity with "sufficient minimal contacts" with the forum state such that the particular suit "does not offend 'traditional notions of fair play and justice.'" The "minimum contacts" must be purposefully directed towards the state by the defendant. This jurisdiction was initially limited to the particulars of the International Shoe Co. v. Washington holding, that is to jurisdictional inquiries regarding companies, but was soon extended to apply to all questions of personal jurisdiction. When an individual or entity has no "minimum contacts" with a forum State, the Due Process Clause of the Fourteenth Amendment prohibits that State from acting against that individual, or entity. The lack of "minimum contacts" with the owner of property also constitutionally prohibits action against that property (in rem jurisdiction) even when the property is located within the forum state.

What constitutes sufficient "minimum contacts" has been delineated in numerous cases which followed the International Shoe decision. For example, in Hanson v. Denckla, the Court proclaimed the "unilateral activity of those who claim some relationship with a nonresident cannot satisfy the requirement of contact with the forum State. The application of that rule will vary with the nature and quality of the defendant's activity, but it is essential in each case that there be some act by which the defendant purposefully avails itself of the privilege of conducting activities within the forum State, thus invoking the benefits and protection of its laws."

The additional requirement of "'purposeful availment' ensures that a defendant will not be hauled into a jurisdiction solely as a result of 'random,' 'fortuitous,' or 'attenuated' contacts, or of the unilateral activity of another party or a third person". Jurisdiction may, however, be exercised, under some circumstances, even though the defendant never physically entered the forum state.

In addition, the claim must arise from those contacts that the defendant had with the forum state. In addition to the minimum contacts test asserted in International Shoe, the assertion of specific personal jurisdiction must be reasonable. The Court in World-Wide Volkswagen Corp. v. Woodson asserted a five-part test for determining if the assertion of personal jurisdiction in a forum state was reasonable. This test considers: the burden on the defendant from litigating in the forum state; the interest of the forum state in having the case adjudicated there; the interests of the plaintiff in adjudicating in the forum state; the interests of the inter-state judiciary—that is, that a court's assertion of personal jurisdiction over an out-of state defendant would not overreach and preempt the interests and judicial sovereignty of another state; and the interests in preserving the judicial integrity of the several states—that is, ensuring one court's assertion of personal jurisdiction over an out of state defendant does not violate the Due Process Clause of the Fourteenth Amendment.

=== General v. specific ===
In the 21st century, the Supreme Court began to develop an important distinction between specific and general forms of personal jurisdiction. In the 2011 case of Goodyear Dunlop Tires Operations, S. A. v. Brown, Justice Ginsburg in her opinion for a unanimous court held that for a forum state to exercise general personal jurisdiction over claims that do not arise out of or relate to the defendant's actual contacts with the state, the defendant's contacts with the state must be so systematic and continuous that the defendant may be regarded as "essentially at home" in the state. This holding was reaffirmed in 2014 by the Supreme Court in Daimler AG v. Bauman and again in 2017 in BNSF Railway Co. v. Tyrrell.

This series of landmark cases implied that general personal jurisdiction cannot be constitutionally asserted over most corporate defendants outside of the states in which they are incorporated or headquartered. This left plaintiffs in most cases with specific personal jurisdiction, which rests upon whether the plaintiff's claims "arise out of or relate to" the defendant's contacts to the forum state. In Bristol-Myers Squibb Co. v. Superior Court (2017), the Supreme Court held that in consolidated mass tort complex litigation in state courts, out-of-state plaintiffs cannot piggyback on in-state plaintiffs' claims to establish the forum state's jurisdiction over the defendant because the out-of-state plaintiffs' claims do not "arise out of or relate to" the defendant's contacts with the forum.

However, in Ford Motor Co. v. Montana Eighth Judicial Dist. (2021), the Supreme Court rejected the argument that the phrase "arise out of or relate to" requires plaintiffs to show direct causation between the defendant's forum contacts and their claims (i.e., that the plaintiffs actually bought allegedly defective cars in the forum state because of the defendant's marketing in that state). Rather, to exercise specific personal jurisdiction, it is sufficient for the plaintiff to show that the defendant's contacts were systematic enough to establish a "strong relationship among the defendant, the forum, and the litigation", such that the defendant was on notice that it could be sued in the forum state.

=== Statutory authorization ===
While the Pennoyer and International Shoe doctrines limit the maximum power of a sovereign state, courts must also have authorization from their own state to actually exercise power on behalf of that state; an individual state may choose to not grant its courts the full power that the state is constitutionally permitted to exercise. Similarly, the jurisdiction of federal courts (other than the Supreme Court) may rest upon and is bounded by the Constitution, but it is actually created and authorized by federal statutes. Thus, a particular exercise of personal jurisdiction must not only be permitted by constitutional doctrine, but be supported by statutory authorization as well. Under Pennoyer, personal jurisdiction was authorized by statutes authorizing service of process, but these methods of service were often lacking because they required such service to be effected by officers of the state, such as sheriffs – an untenable method for defendants located outside of the state but still subject to jurisdiction due to their contacts with the state. Subsequent to the development of the International Shoe doctrine, states have enacted so-called long-arm statutes, by which courts in a state can exercise jurisdiction over a party located outside the state.

The doctrine of International Shoe applies only in cases where the defendant has no physical presence in the forum state. If the defendant is physically present and is served within the state, then "tag jurisdiction" applies. The Supreme Court reaffirmed the notion of "tag jurisdiction" over nonresident defendants in Burnham v. Superior Court of California.

=== Relationship to venue ===
Venue and personal jurisdiction are closely related for practical purposes. A lawyer should usually perform joint analysis of personal jurisdiction and venue issues. Personal jurisdiction is largely a constitutional requirement, though also shaped by state long-arm statutes and Rule 4 of the Federal Rules of Civil Procedure, while venue is purely statutory.

It is possible for either venue or personal jurisdiction to preclude a court from hearing a case. Consider these examples:

- Personal jurisdiction is the limiting factor. In World-Wide Volkswagen Corp. v. Woodson, the plaintiffs sued, in an Oklahoma state court, an automobile dealership based in New York for damages from an explosion that occurred on June 11, 1977, as the plaintiffs drove the car through Oklahoma. Had the plaintiffs sued in U.S. federal court sited in Oklahoma, personal jurisdiction against the dealership would have been unavailable, as the dealership did not have minimum contacts with the forum state. Venue, however, would have been proper under 28 U.S.C. § 1391, the general federal venue statute, because Oklahoma was a state in which a substantial part of the events or omissions giving rise to the claim occurred. However, the United States Supreme Court found that the defendants (World-Wide Volkswagen Corp.) did not have the minimum contacts with Oklahoma necessary to create personal jurisdiction there. [World-Wide Volkswagen was one of the "defendants"; the case cited is WWV Corp (original defendant) v. Woodson (the Oklahoma state judge) ]
- Venue is the limiting factor. Suppose Dale resides in California. Peter from Nevada wants to sue Dale for battery which Dale committed against Peter in California. Peter knows Dale is going to a week-long conference in South Carolina. Peter realizes that Dale would settle a suit that would take place in South Carolina, because it would be too expensive to defend. So, during Dale's trip, Peter serves Dale with process for an action filed in South Carolina federal court. The federal court has personal jurisdiction, based on Dale's presence in South Carolina at the time process was served (transient service of process). However, venue is improper under § 1391.

== See also ==
- Long-arm jurisdiction
- Personal jurisdiction over international defendants in the United States
- Prerogative
- Sui iuris
