= Yahoo! Inc. v. La Ligue Contre Le Racisme et l'Antisemitisme =

- Court: United States Court of Appeals for the Ninth Circuit
- Full case name: Yahoo! Inc. v. La Ligue Contre Le Racisme et l'Antisemitisme, et al
- Argued: March 24, 2005
- Decided: January 12, 2006
- Citation: 433 F.3d 1199 (9th Cir. 2006)

Court membership
- Judges sitting: Mary M. Schroeder, Warren J. Ferguson, Diarmuid O'Scannlain, Michael Daly Hawkins, A. Wallace Tashima, William A. Fletcher, Raymond C. Fisher, Ronald M. Gould, Richard A. Paez, Richard R. Clifton, Carlos Bea

Case opinions
- Per curiam
- Majority: Fletcher, joined by Schroeder, Gould (entire opinion); Hawkins, Fisher, Paez, Clifton, Bea (Parts I and II)
- Concurrence: Ferguson, joined by O'Scannlain, Tashima
- Concur/dissent: Fisher, joined by Hawkins, Paez, Clifton, Bea

Yahoo! Inc. v. La Ligue Contre Le Racisme et l'antisemitisme, 433 F.3d 1199 (9th Cir. 2006), was an Internet jurisdiction case of the United States Court of Appeals for the Ninth Circuit, on whether American courts must help enforce penalties against American-operated websites that had been enacted by other nations.

== Background ==
Selling or displaying Nazi artifacts is illegal in France, but some French users of auction and retail sites hosted at the international yahoo.com site were buying and selling such items. French anti-discrimination groups led by La Ligue Contre Le Racisme et l'antisemitisme (League Against Racism and Antisemitism, or LICRA) filed suit in French court, claiming that Yahoo! was violating French law by allowing French Internet users to buy the Nazi antiques on websites hosted outside of the country.

Yahoo! claimed that as an American company, it was not subjected to French law. Regardless, the French court determined that the company had violated French law and charged the company a penalty of 100,000 Francs (about $13,300) per day until all listings for Nazi artifacts were taken down or made inaccessible for French users. While the local operators of yahoo.fr added warnings for users and worked to take down some listings for Nazi memorabilia, Yahoo! resisted taking similar measures for its general sites that are accessible around the world. Yahoo! also refused to pay the penalty, again citing a lack of jurisdiction for the French court that instituted the penalty.

Believing that Yahoo!'s refusal to pay the fine was a violation of the Hague Convention, which requires international cooperation to settle war crimes (with the Nazis as the criminals), LICRA contacted the United States Marshals Service and suggested that the Marshals should enforce the ruling of the French court, by collecting the daily fine from Yahoo! and ordering the company to take down the offending material from all its sites on the World Wide Web. The Marshals declined to take action but informed Yahoo! of the request.

Yahoo! filed suit in the district court for the Northern District of California against LICRA, arguing that the organization's demands were moot because the French courts did not have jurisdiction to charge the penalty, and that the French court's order to take down offending material was untenable under Yahoo!'s free speech rights as an American company. More specifically, Yahoo! requested declaratory relief on whether the French court order was enforceable against them as an American company. LICRA argued that the American court did not have jurisdiction over them, so they should retain the ability to utilize the U.S. Marshals to enforce an international legal order.

The district court determined that it did have personal jurisdiction over LICRA because it was requesting law enforcement actions in that court's territory. Then the district court ruled against LICRA's motion to dismiss the suit, effectively agreeing with Yahoo! that it should not be subjected to a French court ruling. LICRA appealed this decision to the Ninth Circuit Court of Appeals.

== Opinion ==
The question before the Ninth Circuit was whether it and other American courts have jurisdiction over LICRA as a French organization requesting law enforcement action in the United States. Applying the precedential Calder Test on determining personal jurisdiction in international legal disputes, the circuit court ruled that LICRA's request would not require significant actions by Yahoo! because the French court order was unenforceable in the United States. Therefore the circuit court held that it, and the lower court, did have jurisdiction in the dispute.

This overturned Yahoo's victory at the district court, but this was also a loss for LICRA because the circuit court ruled that the dispute was not adjudicable in the United States at all. As an international dispute with unclear procedures on how to enforce or acknowledge the French court order, the case was not ripe for adjudication in American courts.

The circuit court noted that this ruling was focused purely on jurisdiction, for both the French court in its order for Yahoo! to take down material and pay a fine, and LICRA's attempts to enforce that order. The circuit court avoided any discussion of the morality of buying and selling Nazi memorabilia or France's motivations in suppressing that type of business activity. Also, Yahoo! had the ability to refuse certain auctions on a case-by-case basis and to refuse shipping to certain locations, and the circuit court found that those were sufficient for addressing the controversy in France.

== Impact ==
The ruling has been cited as an important early precedent in efforts by governments to regulate the Internet at the international level, when trying to maintain democratic or cultural norms. The continuing confusion over the ability of one nation to regulate the users and designers of a foreign website, which by definition is accessible around the world via the World Wide Web, was widely discussed by regulators and experts due to the outcome of this case.
