= Pacific Christian Advocate =

Defunct Oregon Newspaper, 1850–1932

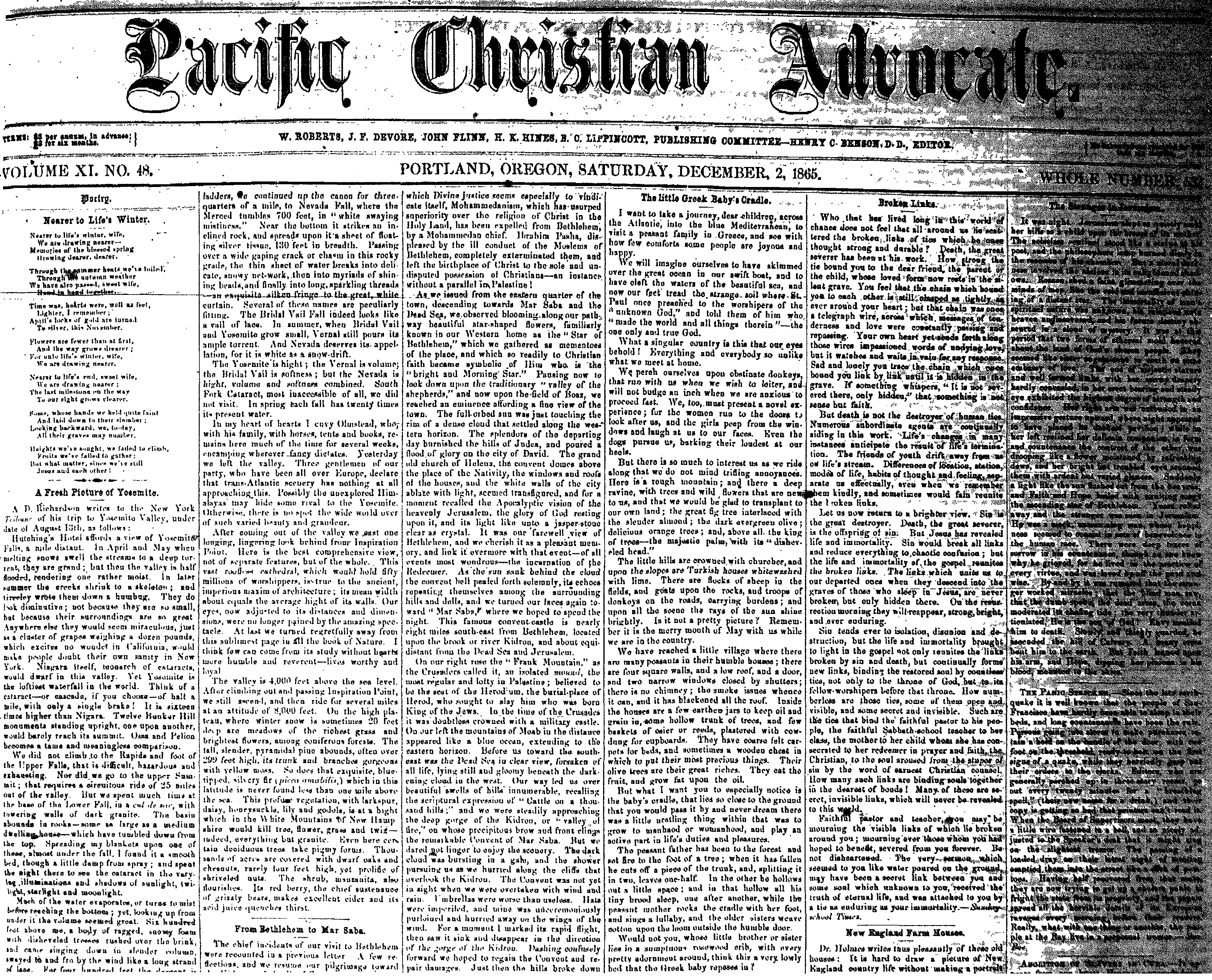
- Front page of 2 December 1865 edition
- Type: Weekly newspaper
- Founder: Alvin F. Waller
- Founded: 1850
- Ceased publication: 1932
- Language: English
- City: Salem, Oregon (1850-1859); Portland, Oregon (1859-1932)
- Country: United States

The Pacific Christian Advocate was a Methodist newspaper printed from 4 December 1850, until editor Laird Mills was transferred to San Francisco to edit the national Christian Advocate in 1932. It was first published in Salem, Oregon, before moving to Portland, Oregon, in 1859. The paper concentrated heavily on news of interest to Methodists in the Oregon Territory, and later across the State of Oregon.

Editors to the paper were elected by two Methodist bishops.

Two attempts have been made to digitize the paper. The first was in 1964 by the Chemeketa Chapter of the Oregon Daughters of the Revolution. They created an index of article titles and genealogical data from 1864 to 1890. The second attempt was a digital copy of microfilm in 1999 by Sharon E. Osborn-Ryan through Heritage Trail Press. This collection covers the first issue printed on December 4, 1850 to the December 27, 1856 (Vol. 7, No.5) issue.

Current archives of the paper are available on microfilm at the Oregon Historical Society in Portland, the Oregon State Library in Salem, and the University of Oregon's Knight Library in Eugene.

Due to its prominent place in documenting Oregon life, the paper included a number of notable articles such as "A Life Adventure ~ Lydia Hines", a glowing comment on artist Carl J. Larsen's abilities, and is heavily referenced in a number of books from the late 19th and early 20th century.

== Known contributors ==
- Co-Founder: Alvan F. Waller
- Editor: Harvey Kimball Hines
- Editor: Francis S. Hoyt
- Editor: Thomas Pearne
- Business Manager: Edgar A. Klippel
- Contributor: John Spencer
