= Quasi in rem jurisdiction =

A quasi in rem legal action (Latin, "as if against a thing") is a legal action based on property rights of a person absent from the jurisdiction. In the American legal system the state can assert power over an individual simply based on the fact that this individual has property (bank account, debt, share of stock, land) in the state. Quasi in rem jurisdiction does not have much function in the United States any longer. However, in very specific cases, quasi in rem jurisdiction can still be effective.

A quasi in rem action is commonly used when jurisdiction over the defendant is unobtainable due to their absence from the state. Any judgment will affect only the property seized, as in personam jurisdiction is unobtainable.

Of note, in a quasi in rem case the court may lack personal jurisdiction over the defendant, but it has jurisdiction over the defendant's property. The property could be seized to obtain a claim against the defendant. A judgment based on quasi in rem jurisdiction generally affects rights to the property only between the persons involved and does not "bind the entire world" as does a judgment based on "jurisdiction in rem".

The claim does not have to be related to the property seized, but the person must have minimum contacts with the forum state in order for jurisdiction to be proper.

On June 24, 1977, in the case of Shaffer v. Heitner, 433 U.S. 186, the Supreme Court of the United States decided that the requirement that the circumstances giving rise to jurisdiction comply with the notion of "fair play and substantial justice" should apply to the quasi in rem jurisdiction questions. The Supreme Court significantly diminished the utility of the quasi in rem jurisdiction because if the case meets the minimum contacts, fair play and substantial justice tests, the action can be brought under the in personam jurisdiction. Quasi in rem jurisdiction, however, can still be an effective option to bring the lawsuit to a particular court because quasi in rem jurisdiction allows litigants to overcome limitations of the long-arm statute of a particular state.

There are two types of quasi in rem jurisdiction: 1) quasi in rem type 1 (QIM1); and 2) quasi in rem type 2 (QIM2). In QIM1, a plaintiff sues to secure a pre-existing claim in the subject property. For example, actions that seek quiet title against another's claim to the property. In QIM2, the plaintiff has no pre-existing claim in the subject property. That is, the property rights of the owner are not in dispute, but rather the plaintiff seeks the property so that they may satisfy a separate claim. For example, a person who walks across another's real property and falls into an open pit might have no pre-existing claim regarding the property, but may initiate a QIM2 action to redress his injury.
