= Goodyear Dunlop Tires Operations, S.A. v. Brown =

Goodyear Dunlop Tires Operations, S. A. v. Brown
- Supreme Court of the United States

Argued January 11, 2011 Decided June 27, 2011
- Full case name: Goodyear Dunlop Tires Operations, S. A., et al., Petitioners v. Edgar D. Brown, et ux., Co-Administrators of the Estate of Julian David Brown, et al.
- Docket no.: 10-76
- Citations: 564 U.S. 915 (more) 131 S. Ct. 2846; 180 L. Ed. 2d 796
- Argument: Oral argument

Case history
- Prior: denial of motion to dismiss affirmed sub nom. Brown v. Meter, 199 N.C. App. 50, 681 S.E.2d 382 (2009); review denied, 364 N.C. 128, 695 S.E.2d 756 (2010); cert. granted, 561 U.S. 1058 (2010).

Holding
- The connection between Goodyear and its subsidiaries with the state of North Carolina was not strong enough to establish jurisdiction over the companies.

Court membership
- Chief Justice John Roberts Associate Justices Antonin Scalia · Anthony Kennedy; Clarence Thomas · Ruth Bader Ginsburg; Stephen Breyer · Samuel Alito; Sonia Sotomayor · Elena Kagan

Case opinion
- Majority: Ginsburg, joined by unanimous

Laws applied
- U.S. Const. amend. XIV

Goodyear Dunlop Tires Operations, S. A. v. Brown, 564 U.S. 915 (2011), was a United States Supreme Court case in which the Court held that the connection between Goodyear and its subsidiaries with the state of North Carolina was not strong enough to establish general personal jurisdiction over the companies.

== Fact and Procedural History ==
Two 13-year-old boys from North Carolina died as a result of a bus accident outside of Paris. The parents of the boys believed the accident was due to a defective tire manufactured by a foreign subsidiary of Goodyear Tire and Rubber Company and sued for damages in a North Carolina state court. The foreign subsidiaries asserted that the North Carolina courts lacked jurisdiction over them and moved to dismiss. The North Carolina trial court denied the motion and the North Carolina Court of Appeals affirmed.

== Opinion ==
As the claim did not arise in the forum state of North Carolina and none of the type of tires that caused the accident made it to North Carolina, the court cannot exercise specific jurisdiction over the defendants. Additionally, as only a small proportion of the subsidiaries’ products were distributed in North Carolina, and the subsidiaries did not systematically or persistently conduct business there as to be essentially at home there, the court cannot exercise general jurisdiction over all claims against the defendant.

== Result ==
The Supreme Court reversed, holding that the foreign subsidiaries lacked a significant connection to North Carolina to warrant general personal jurisdiction.
