= List of people from Knoxville, Tennessee =

The following is a list of notable people who have lived in Knoxville, Tennessee. For University of Tennessee students and alumni not otherwise associated with Knoxville, see List of University of Tennessee people.

== Art and architecture ==
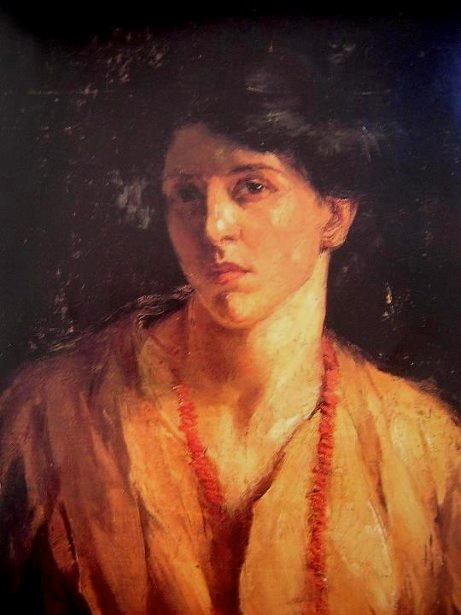
Self-portrait by American artist Catherine Wiley (1879–1958)

- Charles I. Barber (1887–1962), architect
- George Franklin Barber (1854–1915), architect
- Albert Baumann, Jr. (1897–1952), architect
- Albert Baumann, Sr. (1861–1942), architect
- Joseph Baumann (1844–1920), architect
- Lloyd Branson (1853–1925), painter
- Darby Conley (b. 1970), cartoonist, Get Fuzzy
- Beauford Delaney (1901–1979), painter
- Joseph Delaney (1904–1991), painter
- DeWitt Sanford Dykes Sr. (1903–1991), architect, Methodist minister
- R. F. Graf (1865–1929), architect
- Thomas Hope (1757–1820), architect
- Dennis Hwang (b. 1978), graphic artist for Google and Niantic
- Joseph Knaffl (1861–1938), photographer
- Adelia Armstrong Lutz (1859–1931), painter
- Bruce McCarty (1920–2013), architect
- T. M. Schleier (1832–1908), photographer
- Catherine Wiley (1879–1958), painter

== Business and industry ==
- Alexander Arthur (1846–1912), entrepreneur
- Jake Butcher (1936–2017), rogue banker and gubernatorial candidate
- Eldad Cicero Camp (1839–1920), coal tycoon
- Ashley Capps (b. 1955), AC Entertainment founder, co-creator of Bonnaroo Music Festival
- George Dempster (1887–1964), inventor of the Dempster-Dumpster, mayor of Knoxville
- Guilford Glazer (1921–2014), real estate developer and philanthropist
- Dee Haslam (b. 1954), CEO of RIVR Media
- Jim Haslam (b. 1930), founder of Pilot Corp.
- Jimmy Haslam (b. 1954), owner of the Cleveland Browns
- Cal Johnson (1844–1925), saloon and racetrack owner
- Peter Kern (1835–1907), confectioner, founder of Kern's Bakery
- Joseph Alexander Mabry, Jr. (1826–1882), entrepreneur
- Charles McClung McGhee (1828–1907), railroad tycoon
- William J. Oliver (1867–1925), contractor and manufacturer, original low bidder for the construction of the Panama Canal
- Edward J. Sanford (1831–1902), manufacturing tycoon
- Hugh W. Sanford (1879–1961), president of Sanford-Day Iron Works, chief of ferro-alloys section of the War Industries Board
- James G. Sterchi (1867–1932), furniture tycoon
- Dave Thomas (1932–2002), restaurant owner, founder of Wendy's
- Cas Walker (1902–1998), grocery store magnate, radio and television personality
- Chris Whittle (b. 1947), entrepreneur, founder of Channel One News and Edison Schools

== Education ==
- Eben Alexander (1851–1910), Greek language scholar and ambassador
- Charles W. Cansler (1871–1953), Austin High School principal, civil rights advocate and author
- William Henderson Franklin (1852–1935), educator, minister, journalist, and founder of Swift Memorial College
- Thomas William Humes (1815–1892), president of the University of Tennessee (1865–1883)
- Harcourt Morgan (1867–1950), president of the University of Tennessee (1919–1934), director and chairman of the Tennessee Valley Authority

== Entertainment ==
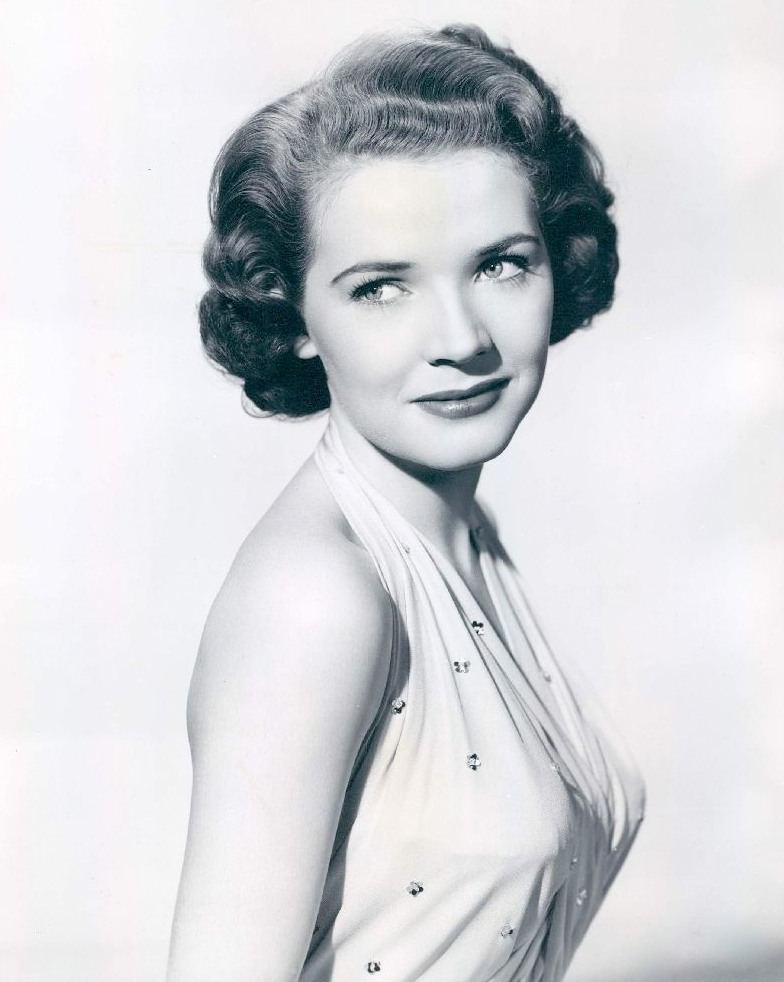
Polly Bergen in 1953

- Kelsea Ballerini (b. 1993), singer-songwriter
- Bianca Belair (b. 1989), professional wrestler
- Polly Bergen (1930–2014), actress, singer
- Natalie Bible' (b. 1983), film director
- Clarence Brown (1890–1987), film director
- Archie Campbell (1914–1987), television personality
- Henry Cho (b. 1962), comedian, actor
- Simeon Coxe (1938–2020), musician, pioneer of electronic music
- Cylk Cozart (b. 1957), actor
- John Cullum (b. 1930), Tony Award-winning actor and singer
- Dale Dickey (b. 1961), actress
- Harry Fujiwara (1935–2016), better known as "Mr. Fuji," professional wrestler
- Christina Hendricks (b. 1975), actress
- Jeff Jarrett (b. 1967), professional wrestler
- Kane (Glenn Jacobs, b. 1967), professional wrestler, Knox County mayor
- David Keith (b. 1954), actor
- Johnny Knoxville (b. 1971), actor and daredevil, changed his last name in reference to his hometown
- Jamie Marchi (b. 1977), actress
- Patricia Neal (1926–2010), Academy Award-winning actress
- Lillian Randolph (1898–1980), actress
- Brad Renfro (1982–2008), actor
- Cailee Spaeny (b.1998), actress born in Knoxville but raised in Missouri
- Quentin Tarantino (b. 1963), Academy Award-winning screenwriter and director
- Bob Thomas (b. 1954), radio personality, actor, writer
- Jake Thomas (b. 1990), actor
- Tina Wesson (b. 1960), contestant, Survivor television series; winner of Survivor: The Australian Outback

== Military ==
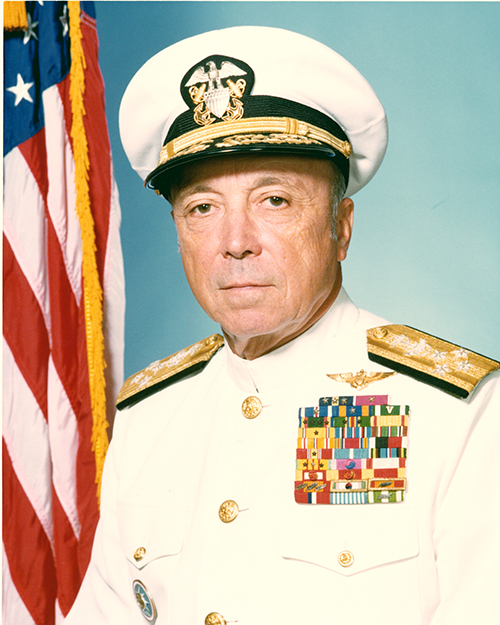
CINCPAC ADM Weisner

- Alexander Bonnyman Jr. (1910–1943), Medal of Honor recipient; killed in action during the Battle of Tarawa
- Roddie Edmonds (1919–1985), World War II POW credited with saving the lives of Jewish service members; honored as Righteous Among the Nations
- David Farragut (1801–1870), Civil War (Union) admiral
- Norman C. Gaddis (1923–2024), Air Force general and Vietnam War POW
- Thomas C. Hindman (1828–1868), Civil War (Confederate) general
- Bruce K. Holloway (1912–1999), commander-in-chief of the Strategic Air Command (1968–1972)
- Lawrence Tyson (1861–1929), World War I general and United States senator
- Maurice F. Weisner (1917–2006), admiral, commander-in-chief of United States Pacific Command, 1976–1979

== Music ==
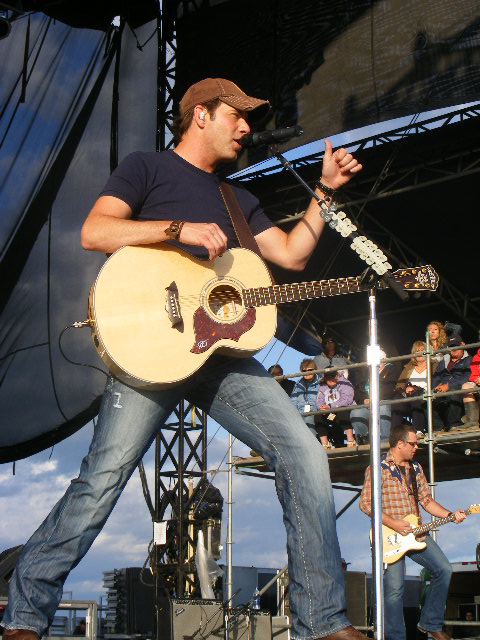
Rodney Atkins in 2009

- 10 Years, alternative rock band
- Roy Acuff (1903–1992), country music singer
- Sheila Aldridge (b. 1956), country music singer, the Aldridge Sisters
- Sherry Aldridge (b. 1954), country music singer, the Aldridge Sisters
- Chet Atkins (1924–2001), country music guitarist
- Rodney Atkins (b. 1969), country musician
- Kelsea Ballerini (b. 1993), country music artist
- Ava Barber (b. 1954), country music singer, featured performer on The Lawrence Welk Show
- Dave Barnes (b. 1978), singer/songwriter/musician
- Brian Bell (b. 1968), guitarist for the band Weezer
- Didi Benami (b. 1986), singer/songwriter, top-ten American Idol finalist
- Chris Blue (b. 1990), singer/songwriter, The Voice season 12 winner
- Kenny Chesney (b. 1968), country musician
- Ashley Cleveland (b. 1957), gospel musician
- Mary Costa (b. 1930), opera singer, voice of Briar Rose / Princess Aurora in Disney's 1959 classic Sleeping Beauty
- Jerome Courtland (1926–2012), actor and director
- John Davis (b. 1974), musician, lead singer of Superdrag
- The Dirty Works, punk band
- Don Everly (1937–2021), early rock-and-roll singer, the Everly Brothers
- Phil Everly (1939–2014), early rock-and-roll singer, the Everly Brothers
- Con Hunley (b. 1945), country music artist
- Ryan Kinder (b. 1988), country music artist
- Phil Leadbetter (b. 1962), bluegrass musician
- Briston Maroney (b. 1998), folk rock musician
- Harry McClintock (1882–1957), folk musician, "The Big Rock Candy Mountains"
- Mary McDonald, sacred music composer
- Brownie McGhee (1915–1996), blues musician
- Stick McGhee (1917–1961), blues musician
- Ashley Monroe (b. 1986), country singer
- Grace Moore (1898–1947), opera singer
- Joseph Patrick Moore (b. 1969), jazz composer, bassist, arranger, producer
- Bobby Ogdin (b. 1945), musician
- Nick Raskulinecz (b. 1970), Grammy Award-winning record producer
- Florence Reece (1900–1986), folk songwriter; coal mining labor activist
- Emily Ann Roberts (b. 1998), singer/songwriter, The Voice runner-up
- Brent Smith (b. 1978), rock singer, lead vocalist for Shinedown
- Ed Snodderly (b. 1952), folk musician and songwriter
- Richard Aaker Trythall (1939–2022), composer and pianist
- Myra Brooks Turner (1936–2017), composer
- Whitechapel, deathcore band

== Politics and law ==
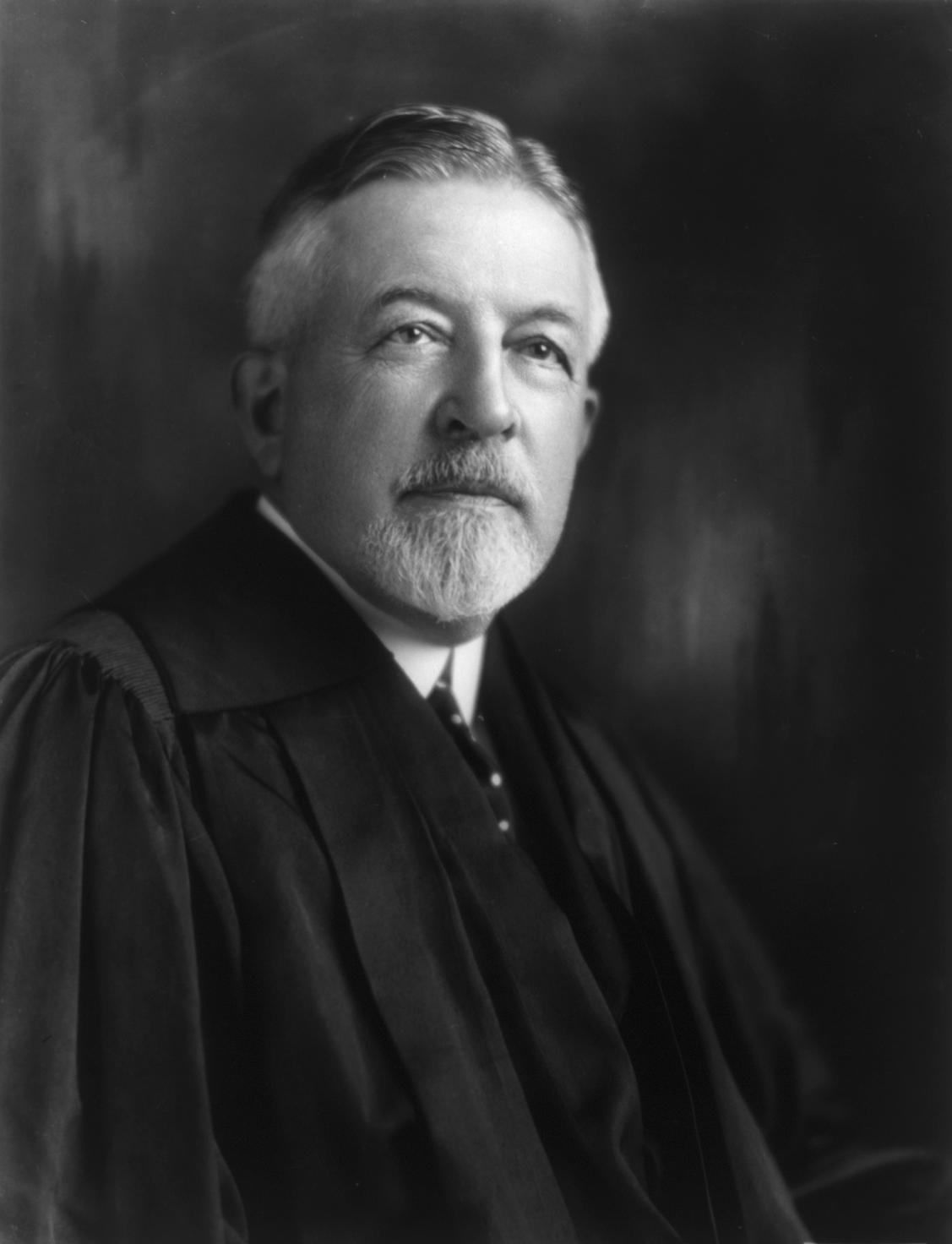
Justice Edward Terry Sanford, 1865–1930

- Robert H. Adams (1792–1830), United States senator from Mississippi
- Alexander O. Anderson (1794–1869), United States senator
- Victor Ashe (b. 1945), former mayor, U.S. ambassador to Poland
- George W. Baxter (1855–1929), territorial governor of Wyoming
- William Blount (1749–1800), Constitutional Convention delegate, governor of the Southwest Territory, United States senator
- William G. "Parson" Brownlow (1805–1877), publisher of the Knoxville Whig, governor of Tennessee, United States senator
- Tim Burchett (born 1964), U.S. representative for Tennessee
- John Hervey Crozier (1812–1889), U.S. congressman
- James Alexander Fowler (1863–1955), U.S. Assistant Attorney General and Knoxville mayor
- Lizzie Crozier French (1851–1926), women's suffragist
- Lucius F. C. Garvin (1841–1922), former governor of Rhode Island
- Sion Harris (1811–1854), member of the Liberian legislature
- Bill Haslam (b. 1958), governor of Tennessee, former mayor of Knoxville
- William H. Hastie (1904–1976), U.S. Virgin Islands governor, first African American federal appellate court judge
- Leonidas Houk (1836–1891), U.S. congressman
- Ray Jenkins (1897–1980), attorney, Senate counsel during the Army-McCarthy Hearings
- Horace Maynard (1814–1882), U.S. congressman and postmaster general
- William Gibbs McAdoo (1863–1941), U.S. secretary of the Treasury
- Lee McClung (1870–1914), U.S. treasurer
- John Randolph Neal, Jr. (1876–1959), law professor, Scopes Trial attorney
- T.A.R. Nelson (1812–1873), U.S. congressman
- John Reinhardt (1920–2016), diplomat
- Glenn Reynolds (b. 1960), legal academic and blogger
- James Herman Robinson (1907–1972), clergyman, founder of Operation Crossroads Africa
- Edward Terry Sanford (1865–1930), U.S. Supreme Court justice
- John Sevier (1745–1815), pioneer and soldier, first governor of Tennessee
- William Henry Sneed (1812–1869), U.S. congressman
- Oliver Perry Temple (1820–1907), attorney, judge, and historian
- Hugh Lawson White (1773–1840), United States senator, presidential candidate
- James White (1747–1820), pioneer, founder of Knoxville
- John Williams (1778–1837), United States senator
- William F. Yardley (1844–1924), attorney, first African American to run for governor of Tennessee

== Science ==
- William M. Bass (b. 1928), founder of the University of Tennessee's Body Farm; author of Death's Acre
- Randall Collins (b. 1941), sociologist and author
- Weston Fulton (1871–1946), meteorologist, inventor
- Jack Hanna (b. 1947), zoologist
- Lexemuel Ray Hesler (1919–1977), mycologist
- Gerald North (b. 1938), climatologist
- Helen Smith, forensic psychologist

== Sports ==
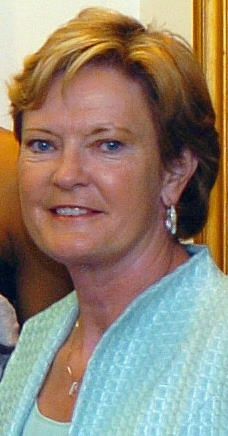
Pat Summitt

- Erik Ainge (b. 1986), former NFL quarterback and sports radio personality
- Trevor Bayne (b. 1991), NASCAR driver and 2011 Daytona 500 winner
- Chad Bell (b. 1989), Major League Baseball player
- Ralph Boston (1939–2023), Olympic athlete
- John Bruhin (b. 1964), NFL player
- Ken Burkhart (1916–2004), MLB player and umpire
- Brett Carroll (b. 1982), MLB player
- Joey Clinkscales (b. 1964), NFL player and executive
- Reggie Cobb (1968–2019), NFL running back
- Mike Cofer (1960–2019), NFL linebacker
- Tony Cosey (b. 1974), All-American cross country and track runner; Olympic athlete in the steeplechase at the 2000 Sydney Olympic Games
- Cartha Doyle (b. 1929), All-American Girls Professional Baseball League player
- Chad Finchum (b. 1994), NASCAR driver
- Phillip Fulmer (b. 1950), former head coach of Tennessee Volunteers football team
- Ray Graves (1918–2015), former NFL player and head coach at Florida
- Anthony Hancock (b. 1960), former NFL player
- Todd Helton (b. 1973), Hall of Fame Major League Baseball player
- Adam Henley (b. 1994), professional soccer player
- Paul Hogue (1940–2009), former NBA player
- Scott Holtzman (b. 1983), mixed martial artist and Ultimate Fighting Championship competitor
- Garth Iorg (b. 1954), Major League Baseball player and coach
- Tim Irwin (b. 1958), former NFL offensive lineman
- Todd Kelly (b. 1970), NFL linebacker
- Pete Kreis (1900–1934), race car driver
- Terry McDaniel (b. 1965), NFL defensive back
- Raleigh McKenzie (b. 1963), NFL lineman
- Reggie McKenzie (b. 1963), NFL linebacker, General Manager of the Oakland Raiders
- Kathleen Malach (1926–2011), All-American Girls Professional Baseball League player
- Billy Meyer (1893–1957), Major League Baseball player and manager
- Robert Neyland (1892–1962), University of Tennessee football coach
- Kevin O'Connell (b. 1985), NFL player
- Rafaello Oliveira (b. 1982), mixed martial artist and Ultimate Fighting Championship competitor
- Peter Oppegard (b. 1959), Olympic figure skater
- Randy Orton (b. 1980), professional wrestler, actor
- Jackie Parker (1932–2006), CFL football player
- Chad Pennington (b. 1976), NFL quarterback
- Jerry Punch (b. 1953), ESPN analyst
- Fuad Reveiz (b. 1963), NFL placekicker
- Ovince St. Preux (b. 1983), mixed martial artist and Ultimate Fighting Championship competitor
- Doris Sams (1927–2012), All-American Girls Professional Baseball League player
- Aaron Schoenfeld (b. 1990), American-Israeli Major League Soccer player
- Steve Searcy (b. 1964), former Major League Baseball pitcher
- Harrison Smith (b. 1989), NFL safety for Minnesota Vikings
- Lee Smith (b. 1987), NFL tight end
- Pat Summitt (1952–2016), former head coach, Tennessee Lady Vols basketball team
- Davis Tarwater (b. 1984), Olympic swimmer
- John Tate (1955–1998), Olympic and professional boxer
- Ben Testerman (b. 1962), professional tennis player
- Leroy Thompson (b. 1968), former NFL running back
- Bubba Trammell (b. 1971), Major League Baseball player
- Elston Turner (b. 1959), NBA player and coach
- Jackie Walker (1950–2002), All-American linebacker at Tennessee
- Josh Walker (b. 1991) NFL guard
- Jason Witten (b. 1982), NFL tight end
- Chris Woodruff (b. 1973), professional tennis player
- Trey Cabbage (b. 1997), Major League Baseball player

== Writers and journalists ==
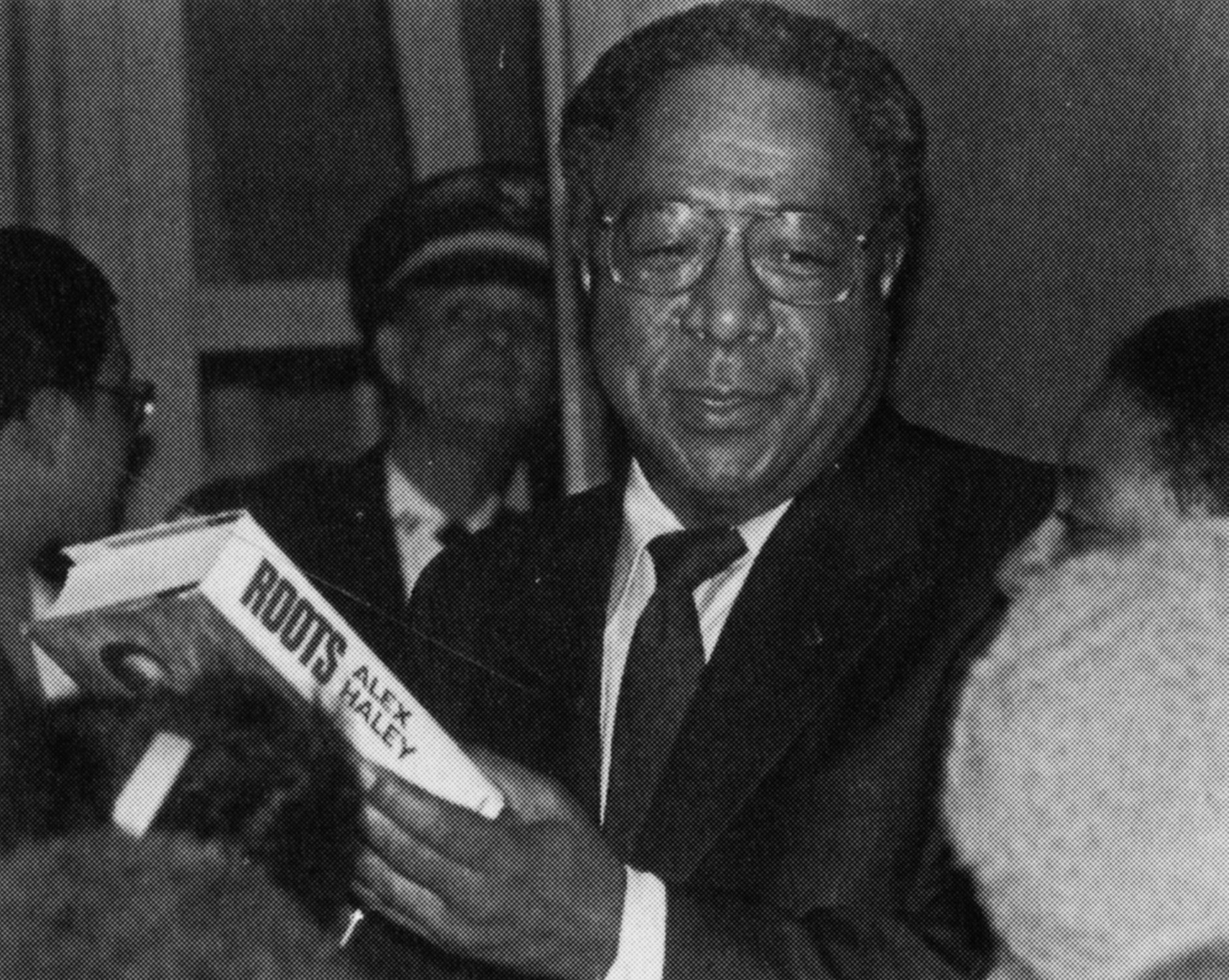
Alex Haley

- James Agee (1909–1955), Pulitzer Prize-winning author
- Paul Y. Anderson (1893–1938), Pulitzer Prize-winning investigative reporter
- Anne W. Armstrong (1872–1958), author of This Day and Time (1930)
- Carson Brewer (1920–2003), journalist and conservationist
- Frances Hodgson Burnett (1849–1924), author of The Secret Garden
- Albert Chavannes (1836–1903), Utopian philosopher
- Lowell Cunningham (b. 1959), comic book writer, Men in Black creator
- Nikki Giovanni (1943–2024), poet
- Alex Haley (1921–1992), author of Roots
- George Washington Harris (1814–1869), Southern humorist
- Frederick Heiskell (1786–1882), pioneering Tennessee journalist; cofounder of the Knoxville Register
- Ed Hooper (b. 1964), author, journalist
- Joseph Wood Krutch (1893–1970), writer, naturalist
- S. J. Mathes (1849?–1927), pioneer California newspaperman
- Cormac McCarthy (1933–2023), Pulitzer Prize-winning author
- Adolph Ochs (1858–1935), newspaper publisher
- J. G. M. Ramsey (1797–1884), historian
- William Rule (1839–1928), newspaper editor, mayor of Knoxville
- Ed Sams (b. 1952), author and educator
- Bernadotte Schmitt (1886–1969), Pulitzer Prize-winning historian
- Karl Edward Wagner (1945–1994), fantasy writer

== Other ==
- Jane Franklin Hommel Denney (1878–1946), socialite and women's club leader
- Adam Ragusea (b. 1982), YouTube chef
- Mary Boyce Temple (1856–1929), philanthropist and preservationist

== See also ==
- History of Knoxville, Tennessee
- List of people from Tennessee
