= Burns v. United States =

- Supreme Court of the United States

Argued November 24, 1926 Decided May 16, 1927
- Full case name: Burns v. United States
- Citations: 274 U.S. 328 (more)

Court membership
- Chief Justice William H. Taft Associate Justices Oliver W. Holmes Jr. · Willis Van Devanter; James C. McReynolds · Louis Brandeis; George Sutherland · Pierce Butler; Edward T. Sanford · Harlan F. Stone

Case opinions
- Majority: Butler
- Dissent: Brandeis

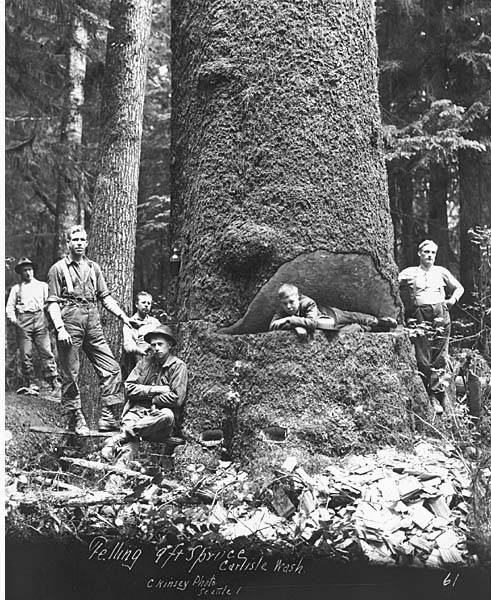
Pacific Northwest Lumber crew, 1917, of the type William Burns attempted to organize in Yosemite.

Burns v. United States, 274 U.S. 328 (1927), was a United States Supreme Court decision centered around William Burns' arrest in California while acting as a labor organizer for the Industrial Workers of the World (I.W.W.). Despite Burns attempts to claim that his association with the labor group the Industrial Workers of the World did not constitute grounds to convict him and took issue the jury instructions that framed the I.W.W. as an illegal organization, the Supreme Court chose to uphold the California Criminal Syndicalism Act and Burns' conviction. Due to the complexities of the I.W.W.'s relationship to sabotage, and amidst court cases such as Whitney v. California and Fiske v. Kansas favoring the upholding of criminal syndicalism laws, the court maintained that the law was not "void for uncertainty" and that the jury instructions stood.

== Background ==
William Burns, a member of the I.W.W., was arrested in Yosemite National Park in 1923. As the I.W.W. attempted to organize lumber workers in the area, a few were convicted under the California Syndicalism Act for having I.W.W. material on their person, but only Burns was brought to trial as he refused to renounce the organization. Convicted on grounds of criminal syndicalism, Burns aimed to appeal based on the definition of sabotage the jury was given. Specifically, that the I.W.W. advocated for the slowing of work, or in the case of Burns' conviction, advocated for "maliciously stowing the cargo of a ship so that it will shift and cause her to list and return to port." Burns argued that forcing ships to turn around and be reloaded did not constitute the "willful and malicious physical damage or injury to physical property," that constituted sabotage under California law, but was rather just a means of safely slowing down production.

=== California Syndicalism Act and the I.W.W. ===
The California Syndicalism Act, enacted in 1919, was amongst a series of state laws enacted throughout America as a response to industrial labor organization and the first red scare. It criminalized syndicalism, which was defined in the law as advocating "the commission of crime, sabotage, or unlawful acts of force and violence or unlawful methods of terrorism as a means of accomplishing a change in industrial ownership or control, or effecting any political change". Rather than criminalizing membership in the I.W.W. directly, as laws such as Australia's Unlawful Associations Act of 1916 had, Californian government relied on the framework of the Alien and Sedition Acts of 1798 and the Espionage Act of 1917 to call on a state of war-time and post-war crisis to validate the necessity for limiting access to labor organizers free speech. While other labor and anarchist groups played a factor in the development of the law, in many ways it was a direct response to increasing I.W.W. presence in California and the fear of revolution that colored the first red scare.

=== Sabotage and the I.W.W. ===
Associated with the Americanization of the French concept of sabotage in the 1910s, the I.W.W. mainly advocated for the traditional concept of sabotage at the time: performing work slowly or incompetently. While initially the organization supported sabotage via the means of damaging machinery at the work place, in the wake the Los Angeles Times Bombing and strikes like the Pullman strike, there was some effort in the I.W.W. from leaders like William D Haywood to distance themselves from the burgeoning more violent definition of sabotage utilized by other labor organizations. By no means philosophically non-violent, while the I.W.W. recognized violence's use in labor struggle, "for practical and strategic reasons they avoided it wherever possible". Despite this, due to their association with labor organization and their known advocacy for sabotage the prevailing belief at the time was that the I.W.W. was a fundamentally violent organization.

== Broader legal context ==
Two other major court cases at the time influenced the context Burns v. United States, Whitney v. California and Fiske v. Kansas. In this period of crackdown on criminal syndicalism, the relationship between the fourteenth amendment's due process clause and the first amendment's protection of free speech brought many appeals to the Supreme Court level. In the case of Fiske v. Kansas in 1917, where Fiske similarly to Burns was convicted for distributing I.W.W. literature, it was determined that the state had provided no evidence that Fiske represented a clear and present danger to the U.S. Government or its citizens, and his conviction was overturned as a violation of the due process clause. However, by the time of Burns v. United States and Whitney v. California in 1927, involvement with labor organizations such as the I.W.W. had evolved as such that "only patently unreasonable laws or laws unreasonably applied could be set aside as violations of due process." This did not include criminal syndicalism laws, which in this period of labor organization was seen as the state "taking action reasonably required to protect itself from destruction or serious political, economic, or moral injury."

== Court ruling and historical impact ==
Burns' defense depended on the idea that advocating for the slow or incompetent loading of cargo ships as a working strike did not meet the defined willful and malicious injury or damage stated in the law, and therefore his conviction was outside its legal influence. The Court maintained that due to his association with the I.W.W., evidenced to be connected to the concept of sabotage, the conviction would be upheld, citing Whitney v. California as a precedent. Burns' appeal was denied, and he was sentenced to fifteen months in United States Penitentiary, Leavenworth. Burns' case joined convictions such as Whitney v. California in upholding the legitimacy of the California Criminal Syndicalism Act and cementing the jurisdiction of the Espionage Act over free speech. Cases such as these would eventually build to Brandenburg v. Ohio (1969), in which imminent lawless action became a prerequisite to criminalizing free speech and Criminal Syndicalism Act rulings not based on such actions but on associations with an organization were explicitly overruled.
