= List of United States Supreme Court cases, volume 274 =

Supreme Court of the United States
- Interactive map of Supreme Court of the United States
- 38°53′26″N 77°00′16″W
- Established: March 4, 1789; 237 years ago
- Location: Washington, D.C.
- Coordinates: 38°53′26″N 77°00′16″W
- Composition method: Presidential nomination with Senate confirmation
- Authorised by: Constitution of the United States, Art. III, § 1
- Judge term length: life tenure, subject to impeachment and removal
- Number of positions: 9 (by statute)
- Website: supremecourt.gov

This is a list of cases reported in volume 274 of United States Reports, decided by the Supreme Court of the United States in 1927.

== Justices of the Supreme Court at the time of volume 274 U.S. ==
The Supreme Court is established by Article III, Section 1 of the Constitution of the United States, which says: "The judicial Power of the United States, shall be vested in one supreme Court . . .". The size of the Court is not specified; the Constitution leaves it to Congress to set the number of justices. Under the Judiciary Act of 1789 Congress originally fixed the number of justices at six (one chief justice and five associate justices). Since 1789, Congress has varied the size of the Court from six to seven, nine, ten, and back to nine justices (always including one chief justice).

When the cases in volume 274 were decided the Court comprised the following nine members:

Portrait	Justice	Office	Home State	Succeeded	Date confirmed by the Senate (Vote)	Tenure on Supreme Court
	William Howard Taft	Chief Justice	Connecticut	Edward Douglass White	June 30, 1921 (Acclamation)	July 11, 1921 – February 3, 1930 (Retired)
	Oliver Wendell Holmes Jr.	Associate Justice	Massachusetts	Horace Gray	December 4, 1902 (Acclamation)	December 8, 1902 – January 12, 1932 (Retired)
	Willis Van Devanter	Associate Justice	Wyoming	Edward Douglass White (as Associate Justice)	December 15, 1910 (Acclamation)	January 3, 1911 – June 2, 1937 (Retired)
	James Clark McReynolds	Associate Justice	Tennessee	Horace Harmon Lurton	August 29, 1914 (44–6)	October 12, 1914 – January 31, 1941 (Retired)
	Louis Brandeis	Associate Justice	Massachusetts	Joseph Rucker Lamar	June 1, 1916 (47–22)	June 5, 1916 – February 13, 1939 (Retired)
	George Sutherland	Associate Justice	Utah	John Hessin Clarke	September 5, 1922 (Acclamation)	October 2, 1922 – January 17, 1938 (Retired)
	Pierce Butler	Associate Justice	Minnesota	William R. Day	December 21, 1922 (61–8)	January 2, 1923 – November 16, 1939 (Died)
	Edward Terry Sanford	Associate Justice	Tennessee	Mahlon Pitney	January 29, 1923 (Acclamation)	February 19, 1923 – March 8, 1930 (Died)
	Harlan F. Stone	Associate Justice	New York	Joseph McKenna	February 5, 1925 (71–6)	March 2, 1925 – July 2, 1941 (Continued as chief justice)

== Notable Cases in 274 U.S. ==
=== Buck v. Bell ===
In Buck v. Bell, 274 U.S. 200 (1927), the Supreme Court ruled that a state statute permitting compulsory sterilization of the unfit, including the intellectually disabled, "for the protection and health of the state" did not violate the Due Process Clause of the Fourteenth Amendment to the United States Constitution. Despite the changing attitudes in the coming decades regarding sterilization, the Supreme Court has never expressly overturned Buck v. Bell. It was widely believed to have been slightly weakened by Skinner v. Oklahoma 316 U.S. 535 (1942), which involved compulsory sterilization of male habitual criminals (and came to a contrary result).

=== Whitney v. California ===
In Whitney v. California, 274 U.S. 357 (1927), the Supreme Court upheld the conviction of a person who had engaged in speech that raised a threat to society. The question before the court was whether the 1919 Criminal Syndicalism Act of California violated the Fourteenth Amendment's Due Process and Equal Protection Clauses. The Court unanimously upheld Whitney's conviction; holding that the state, in exercise of its police power, has the power to punish those who abuse their rights to freedom of speech "by utterances inimical to the public welfare, tending to incite crime, disturb the public peace, or endanger the foundations of organized government and threaten its overthrow." In other words, words with a "bad tendency" can be punished.

=== United States v. Lee ===
United States v. Lee, 274 U.S. 559 (1927), is a significant decision by the Supreme Court protecting prohibition laws. The Court held 1) the U.S. Coast Guard may seize, board, and search vessels beyond the U.S. territorial waters and the high seas 12 miles outward from the coast if probable cause exists to believe that the vessel and persons in it are violating U.S. revenue laws, and 2) the Coast Guard's use of searchlights to view contents of a vessel on the high seas does not constitute a search and thus does not warrant Fourth Amendment protections; the use of a searchlight is comparable to the use of binoculars, and the courts have long held that use of binoculars by law enforcement is not prohibited by the Constitution.

== Citation style ==
Under the Judiciary Act of 1789 the federal court structure at the time comprised District Courts, which had general trial jurisdiction; Circuit Courts, which had mixed trial and appellate (from the US District Courts) jurisdiction; and the United States Supreme Court, which had appellate jurisdiction over the federal District and Circuit courts—and for certain issues over state courts. The Supreme Court also had limited original jurisdiction (i.e., in which cases could be filed directly with the Supreme Court without first having been heard by a lower federal or state court). There were one or more federal District Courts and/or Circuit Courts in each state, territory, or other geographical region.

The Judiciary Act of 1891 created the United States Courts of Appeals and reassigned the jurisdiction of most routine appeals from the district and circuit courts to these appellate courts. The Act created nine new courts that were originally known as the "United States Circuit Courts of Appeals." The new courts had jurisdiction over most appeals of lower court decisions. The Supreme Court could review either legal issues that a court of appeals certified or decisions of court of appeals by writ of certiorari. On January 1, 1912, the effective date of the Judicial Code of 1911, the old Circuit Courts were abolished, with their remaining trial court jurisdiction transferred to the U.S. District Courts.

Bluebook citation style is used for case names, citations, and jurisdictions.

- "# Cir." = United States Court of Appeals
  - e.g., "3d Cir." = United States Court of Appeals for the Third Circuit
- "D." = United States District Court for the District of . . .
  - e.g.,"D. Mass." = United States District Court for the District of Massachusetts
- "E." = Eastern; "M." = Middle; "N." = Northern; "S." = Southern; "W." = Western
  - e.g.,"M.D. Ala." = United States District Court for the Middle District of Alabama
- "Ct. Cl." = United States Court of Claims
- The abbreviation of a state's name alone indicates the highest appellate court in that state's judiciary at the time.
  - e.g.,"Pa." = Supreme Court of Pennsylvania
  - e.g.,"Me." = Supreme Judicial Court of Maine

== List of cases in volume 274 U.S. ==
Case Name	Page and year	Opinion of the Court	Concurring opinion(s)	Dissenting opinion(s)	Lower Court	Disposition
Fairmont Creamery Company v. Minnesota	1 (1927)	McReynolds	none	none	Minn.	reversed
Ohio Public Service Company v. Ohio ex rel. Fritz	12 (1927)	McReynolds	none	none	Ohio	reversed
Hodgson v. Federal Oil and Development Company	15 (1927)	McReynolds	none	none	8th Cir.	affirmed
Hoffman v. Missouri ex rel. Foraker	21 (1927)	Brandeis	none	none	Mo.	affirmed
Lowe v. Dickson	23 (1927)	Sutherland	none	none	Okla.	reversed
Chicago, Rock Island and Pacific Railroad Company v. United States	29 (1927)	Sutherland	none	none	N.D. Tex.	affirmed
Bedford Cut Stone Company v. Journeymen Stone Cutters' Association of North America	37 (1927)	Sutherland	Sanford; Stone	Brandeis	7th Cir.	reversed
Northern Railroad Company v. Page	65 (1927)	Butler	none	none	1st Cir.	reversed
Southern Railroad Company v. Kentucky	76 (1927)	Butler	none	Brandeis	Ky.	reversed
McDonald v. Maxwell	91 (1927)	Sanford	none	none	D.C. Cir.	reversed
American National Company v. United States	99 (1927)	Sanford	none	none	W.D. Okla.	reversed
United States ex rel. Norwegian Nitrogen Products Company v. United States Tariff Commission	106 (1927)	Stone	none	none	D.C. Cir.	vacated
Louis Pizitz Dry Goods Company, Inc. v. Yeldell	112 (1927)	Stone	none	none	Ala.	affirmed
New York Dock Company v. Steamship Poznan	117 (1927)	Stone	none	none	2d Cir.	reversed
Fidelity National Bank and Trust Company of Kansas City v. Swope	123 (1927)	Stone	none	none	8th Cir.	reversed
Morris v. Duby	135 (1927)	Taft	none	none	D. Or.	affirmed
Federal Trade Commission v. Klesner	145 (1927)	Taft	none	McReynolds	D.C. Cir.	reversed
Federal Trade Commission v. Claire Furnace Company	160 (1927)	Taft	none	McReynolds	D.C. Cir.	reversed
Kadow v. Paul	175 (1927)	Taft	none	none	Wash.	affirmed
Timken Roller Bearing Company v. Pennsylvania Railroad Company	181 (1927)	Taft	none	none	N.D. Ohio	transfer to 6th Cir.
Road Improvement District No. 1 of Franklin County, Arkansas v. Missouri Pacific Railroad Company	188 (1927)	VanDevanter	none	none	8th Cir.	affirmed
Duignan v. United States	195 (1927)	Stone	none	none	2d Cir.	affirmed
Buck v. Bell	200 (1927)	Holmes	none	none	Va.	affirmed
Burnrite Coal Briquette Company v. Riggs	208 (1927)	Brandeis	none	none	3d Cir.	affirmed
Liggett and Myers Tobacco Company v. United States	215 (1927)	Butler	none	none	Ct. Cl.	reversed
Kercheval v. United States	220 (1927)	Butler	none	none	8th Cir.	reversed
United States v. Stone and Downer Company	225 (1927)	Taft	none	McReynolds	Ct. Cust. App.	reversed
Zimmermann v. Sutherland	253 (1927)	Holmes	none	none	2d Cir.	affirmed
Westfall v. United States	256 (1927)	Holmes	none	none	6th Cir.	certification
United States v. Sullivan	259 (1927)	Holmes	none	none	4th Cir.	reversed
United States v. Alford	264 (1927)	Holmes	none	none	N.D. Fla.	reversed
United States v. Sisal Sales Corporation	268 (1927)	McReynolds	none	none	S.D.N.Y.	reversed
Deal v. United States	277 (1927)	McReynolds	none	none	9th Cir.	reversed
Hope Natural Gas Company v. Hall	284 (1927)	McReynolds	none	none	W. Va.	affirmed
Alston v. United States	289 (1927)	McReynolds	none	none	8th Cir.	affirmed
United States v. Ludey	295 (1927)	Brandeis	none	none	Ct. Cl.	reversed
St. Louis and San Francisco Railroad Company v. Spiller	304 (1927)	Brandeis	none	none	8th Cir.	multiple
Baltimore Steamship Company v. Phillips	316 (1927)	Sutherland	none	none	2d Cir.	reversed
Zahn v. Board of Public Works of the City of Los Angeles	325 (1927)	Sutherland	none	none	Cal.	affirmed
Burns v. United States	328 (1927)	Butler	none	Brandeis	N.D. Cal.	affirmed
Phelps v. United States	341 (1927)	Butler	none	none	Ct. Cl.	reversed
Chicago, Milwaukee and St. Paul Railway Company v. Public Utilities Commission of Idaho	344 (1927)	Butler	none	none	Idaho	reversed
Hess v. Pawloski	352 (1927)	Butler	none	none	Mass. Super. Ct.	affirmed
Whitney v. California	357 (1927)	Sanford	Brandeis	none	Cal. Ct. App.	affirmed
Fiske v. Kansas	380 (1927)	Sanford	none	none	Kan.	reversed
Fort Smith Light and Traction Company v. Board of Improvement of Paving District No. 16 of Fort Smith	387 (1927)	Stone	none	none	Ark.	affirmed
Ohio ex rel. Clarke v. Deckebach	392 (1927)	Stone	none	none	Ohio	affirmed
United States v. S.S. White Dental Manufacturing Company	398 (1927)	Stone	none	none	Ct. Cl.	affirmed
Seeman v. Philadelphia Warehouse Company	403 (1927)	Stone	none	none	2d Cir.	affirmed
Posados v. City of Manila	410 (1927)	Taft	none	none	Phil	affirmed
Overland Motor Company v. Packard Motor Company	417 (1927)	Taft	none	none	7th Cir.	certification
Messel v. Foundation Company	427 (1927)	Taft	none	none	La.	reversed
Rhea v. Smith	434 (1927)	Taft	none	none	Mo.	reversed
Cline v. Frink Dairy Company	445 (1927)	Taft	none	none	D. Colo.	multiple
United States v. Freights of Steamship Mount Shasta	466 (1927)	Holmes	none	McReynolds	D. Mass.	reversed
Empire Trust Company v. Cahan	473 (1927)	Holmes	none	none	2d Cir.	reversed
Biddle v. Perovich	480 (1927)	Holmes	none	none	8th Cir.	certification
New York v. Illinois and Sanitary District of Chicago	488 (1927)	VanDevanter	none	none	original	motion to strike granted
Power Manufacturing Company v. Saunders	490 (1927)	VanDevanter	none	Holmes	Ark.	reversed
Longest v. Langford	499 (1927)	VanDevanter	none	none	Okla.	dismissed
Maul v. United States	501 (1927)	VanDevanter	Brandeis	none	2d Cir.	affirmed
Nichols v. Coolidge	531 (1927)	McReynolds	none	none	D. Mass.	affirmed
Federal Trade Commission v. American Tobacco Company	543 (1927)	McReynolds	none	none	2d Cir.	affirmed
Joines v. Patterson	544 (1927)	McReynolds	none	none	Okla.	reversed
Clark v. Poor	554 (1927)	Brandeis	none	none	S.D. Ohio	affirmed
United States v. Lee	559 (1927)	Brandeis	none	none	1st Cir.	reversed
Assigned Car Cases	564 (1927)	Brandeis	none	McReynolds	E.D. Pa.	reversed
Lawrence v. St. Louis–San Francisco Railway Company	588 (1927)	Brandeis	none	none	N.D. Okla.	reversed
Arkansas Railroad Commission v. Chicago, Rock Island and Pacific Railroad Company	597 (1927)	Brandeis	none	none	E.D. Ark.	reversed
Gorieb v. Fox	603 (1927)	Sutherland	none	none	Va.	affirmed
Merritt and Chapman Derrick and Wrecking Company v. United States	611 (1927)	Butler	none	none	S.D.N.Y.	affirmed
Stewart and Company v. Rivara	614 (1927)	Butler	none	none	N.Y. Sup. Ct.	affirmed
Federal Trade Commission v. Eastman Kodak Company	619 (1927)	Sanford	none	Stone	2d Cir.	affirmed
Portneuf-Marsh Valley Canal Company v. Brown	630 (1927)	Stone	none	none	9th Cir.	affirmed
Independent Coal and Coke Company v. United States	640 (1927)	Stone	none	none	8th Cir.	affirmed
Fox River Paper Company v. Railroad Commission of Wisconsin	651 (1927)	Stone	none	none	Wis.	affirmed
Weedin v. Chin Bow	657 (1927)	Taft	none	none	9th Cir.	reversed
City of Vidalia v. McNeely	676 (1927)	VanDevanter	none	none	W.D. La.	affirmed
Twist v. Prairie Oil and Gas Company	684 (1927)	Brandeis	none	none	8th Cir.	reversed
United States v. International Harvester Company	693 (1927)	Sanford	none	none	D. Minn.	affirmed
