= Hess v. Pawloski =

- Supreme Court of the United States

Argued April 18, 1927 Decided May 16, 1927
- Full case name: Hess v. Pawloski
- Citations: 274 U.S. 352 (more) 47 S.Ct. 632; 71 L. Ed. 1091; 1927 U.S. LEXIS 34

Case history
- Prior: Denial of motion to dismiss affirmed, 250 Mass. 22, 144 N.E. 760, 35 A.L.R. 945 (Mass. 1924). Defendant's exceptions overruled, 253 Mass. 478, 149 N.E. 122 (Mass. 1925). Trial court then entered judgment for the plaintiff.

Holding
- A statute appointing an agent for service of process for non-resident motorists involved in accidents while in the Commonwealth of Massachusetts complies with the Fourteenth Amendment.

Court membership
- Chief Justice William H. Taft Associate Justices Oliver W. Holmes Jr. · Willis Van Devanter; James C. McReynolds · Louis Brandeis; George Sutherland · Pierce Butler; Edward T. Sanford · Harlan F. Stone

Case opinion
- Majority: Butler, joined by unanimous

Laws applied
- M.G.L.A. c.90 amended St.Mass 1923, c. 431, Sec. 2; U.S.C.A. Const. Amend. 14.

Hess v. Pawloski, 274 U.S. 352 (1927), was a case in which the Supreme Court of the United States held that a statute designating the Massachusetts registrar of motor vehicles as agent for purpose of service of process for out-of-state non-resident motorists complies with the Due Process Clause of the Fourteenth Amendment.

== Background ==
Hess, a Pennsylvania resident, was involved in a car accident with Pawloski, a Massachusetts resident, while driving in Worcester, Massachusetts.

At the time of the accident, a Massachusetts statute stated that a non-resident motorist implicitly consented to the appointment of the registrar of motor vehicles to act as his agent for service of process in the Commonwealth of Massachusetts, and that personal service served upon the registrar was to be as valid as personal service upon the defendant, so long as a copy of the process was forwarded by registered mail to the defendant at the defendant's last known address. This legal concept of "implied consent" allowed Massachusetts to exercise jurisdiction over nonresidents who were not present in the state at the time service of process was executed upon the agent as stipulated in the statute. In the Massachusetts court, Hess appeared specially to contest jurisdiction but not answer the claim against him. His motion to dismiss was denied.

On appeal, Hess argued that the Massachusetts statute at issue in the case was an unconstitutional exercise of the Commonwealth of Massachusetts's police power in light of the Due Process Clause of the Fourteenth Amendment, and that Massachusetts could not exercise personal jurisdiction over him because

1. he was not a resident of the state,
2. he was not personally served while in Massachusetts, and
3. he never consented to the appointment of an agent for service of process.

== Analysis ==
In this decision, the Court expanded the reach of personal jurisdiction beyond rule promulgated in prior Supreme Court jurisprudence, because it suggested that non-residents are subject to a court having jurisdiction at the location of an accident. Only three exceptions to territorial jurisdiction existed: cases involving marriage status; where a party has given consent (e.g. establishing a corporation); and where the party is a resident of the state. In Hess, the court relaxed the legal rules defining consent established in Pennoyer v. Neff to include nonresidents who travel through Massachusetts using the highway system.

This decision reflected an attempt by the Court to fit the problems of an increasingly more mobile and technologically advanced society in the model of Justice Field in Pennoyer.

The Court reasoned that cars are dangerous, and that states have the power to regulate their operation in order to make highways safe. Here, the implied consent was narrowly limited to proceedings related to accidents on highways in which the non-resident is involved. The difference between a formal and informal appointment of an agent isn't substantive in relation to the Due Process Clause.

Most importantly, the statute is not hostile to the non-resident, because he is put on nearly equal footing with the resident plaintiff.

== See also ==
- List of United States Supreme Court cases, volume 274
