= United States v. Vampire Nation =

Criminal case involving sentencing

- Court: United States Court of Appeals for the Third Circuit
- Full case name: United States of America v. Vampire Nation a/k/a Fredrik Von Hamilton a/k/a Frederick Hamilton Banks, Frederick H. Banks, Appellant.
- Argued: May 16 2006
- Decided: June 20 2006
- Citation: 451 F.3d 189

Case history
- Prior history: Defendant convicted at trial in Western District of Pennsylvania

Holding
- Since Federal Sentencing Guidelines have been held to be advisory, Rule 32(h) does not require notice of contemplated variance; provisions for in personam criminal forfeiture exist wherever statute authorizes civil forfeiture and is otherwise silent. Conviction and sentence affirmed.

Court membership
- Judges sitting: Marjorie Rendell, Joseph F. Weis, Jr., Franklin Van Antwerpen

Case opinions
- Majority: Van Antwerpen

Laws applied
- Federal Rules of Criminal Procedure, Federal Sentencing Guidelines, Civil Asset Forfeiture Reform Act of 2000

United States v. Vampire Nation, 451 F.3d 189, is a 2006 decision of the United States Court of Appeals for the Third Circuit regarding the Federal Sentencing Guidelines and asset forfeiture. A three-judge panel unanimously affirmed the conviction and sentence of Frederick Banks, a Pittsburgh man, on numerous felony charges resulting from fraudulent schemes carried out over the Internet. The case takes its title, which has been singled out as memorable and included among lists of amusingly titled cases, from one of Banks' aliases, an electronic music group of which he was the sole regular member. He had filed the appeal under that name while representing himself.

Banks had been offering discounted versions of Microsoft software online under different names as an Amazon.com reseller. His products were either pirated or deficient, costing some customers thousands of dollars, and eventually one complained to the FBI, who arrested Banks after a short investigation. At trial a jury convicted him of mail fraud, criminal copyright infringement and several other charges.

The judge sentenced Banks to five years in prison, varying the sentence upward by three months from the maximum range specified by the sentencing guidelines. An in personam criminal forfeiture judgment was also entered against him. Banks appealed to the Third Circuit, citing those among seven possible grounds for reversing the conviction. Foremost among them, he argued that notice of the possibility of variance was required prior to the sentencing and that the district court lacked the statutory authority to order the criminal forfeiture.

Judge Franklin Van Antwerpen wrote for the panel, which ruled for the government on all the issues. Other circuits had ruled on the variance issue, and he joined four of them in holding that Federal Rule of Criminal Procedure 32(h), which required a court to notify lawyers in advance of a contemplated departure, did not impose the same requirement on a variance. The forfeiture was likewise permitted since the mail fraud statute provided for civil forfeiture and, while it explicitly provided for criminal forfeiture only in cases where a financial institution was victimized, he did not find that Congress intended to limit it only to those cases via "a chain of cross-references."

== Investigation and prosecution ==
Under the names Rick Burgess and John Cain, Banks started offering Microsoft software for resale on Amazon.com in 2002. Amazon's policy, which Banks was made aware of when he opened the account, required that all such products offered for sale through the site by third parties such as himself be the full retail version, not copies or duplicates. Banks sold several copies of software over the next year. "These buyers," Van Antwerpen recounted, "suspected that the software they purchased from Banks was illegally copied because the compact discs ("CDs") they received from Banks contained generic white CDs with fake labels and fake package inserts."

Some complained to Amazon, and at the beginning of the following year Amazon terminated the "Cain and Burgess" account for violating its policies. Banks opened a new account under the name Mark Howard and resumed his activities. Court documents identified one buyer as Action Software, Inc., which bought $294,859.00 worth of Microsoft products through the site. Though the order should have filled approximately 50 boxes, only 5 boxes were shipped by Banks via UPS. Even more suspiciously, the CDs in the boxes bore the name of IBM. Action Software was not able to recoup the nearly $50,000 it had laid out since the order was cash on delivery.

When Banks denied any wrongdoing, Action Software contacted the FBI. In May 2003 the FBI obtained a search warrant and combed Banks' house, coming up with "computers, blank CDs, a CD duplicating machine, and empty boxes from Microsoft and IBM software". On the computers were "images of the front and back sides of Microsoft software boxes".

Banks continued offering software for sale on Amazon and later he approached VioSoftware, a Colorado reseller from whom he had purchased Microsoft software the year before. He persuaded Warren Do, the company's chief executive officer, to sell him nearly $60,000 worth of Microsoft products COD. Banks paid with a forged check. When Do found out, he asked for the software back and told Banks he had been talking to the FBI. The two agreed that Do would return the check if Banks returned the software. Do was subpoenaed by a grand jury in the Western District of Pennsylvania the next day, and told Banks via email that he had told the FBI all about their arrangement. In reply Banks pleaded with him not to tell the grand jury anything as "this would all be for nothing."

Instead of returning what he had bought from VioSoftware, Banks shipped some of it to his other customers. What he did return later on was damaged. Do's contact with the FBI led to another search of Banks' house in September, yielding computers with evidence of software piracy and various Microsoft products and packaging.

A week later, a grand jury returned a five-count indictment against Banks that would be amended and superseded twice over the next year. Ultimately, Banks was charged with three counts of mail fraud and one count each of criminal copyright infringement, uttering and possessing counterfeit or forged securities, money laundering and witness tampering, all felonies. The case went to trial for ten days in October 2004. Banks was convicted on all counts. At the sentencing hearing five months later, Judge Thomas Hardiman added three months to the 46–57 month advisory range derived from the Federal Sentencing Guidelines, imposing a prison sentence of 60 months followed by three years of supervised release. The judge also entered an in personam criminal forfeiture judgment against Banks for $70,708.59, the total amount he had made from his crimes.

== Appeal ==
Acting on his own behalf, Banks filed an appeal with the Third Circuit Court of Appeals. He filed under the name of Vampire Nation, an electronic musical ensemble of which he was the sole regular member that had performed in the Pittsburgh area for several years.

He alleged that seven potentially reversible errors had occurred during his trial:

- The district court was required under Rule of Criminal Procedure 32(h) to give notice not just when a departure from the sentencing guidelines was contemplated but a variance as well.
- The district court lacked the statutory authority to order the criminal forfeiture.
- The district court could not order a forfeiture amount greater than Banks' personal net worth at the time of sentencing.
- He was improperly convicted of copyright infringement since the government had not proved that the allegedly infringed works were copyrighted.
- He was improperly convicted of counterfeiting securities since the court's jury instruction on the charge had amounted to a constructive amendment to the indictment.
- He was improperly convicted of witness tampering because the jury was not instructed that the government had to show a nexus between the acts constituting the alleged tampering and an ongoing proceeding, as required by the recent Supreme Court decision in Arthur Andersen LLP v. United States.
- He was entitled to a retrial since the judge had not ruled on one of his motions for self-representation, and
- The judge should have sua sponte recused himself from the sentencing since Banks had filed a misconduct complaint against him beforehand.

A three-judge panel of circuit judges Marjorie Rendell, Franklin Van Antwerpen and senior circuit judge Joseph F. Weis, Jr. was assigned to the case. They heard oral arguments in May 2006. By that time Banks had retained new counsel, David Chontos, who argued his case to the court; Laura Schleich Irwin of the U.S. Attorney's office spoke for the government.

== Opinion of the court ==
A month after hearing arguments, the panel handed down its decision, ruling for the government on all the issues presented. Banks' convictions and sentence were upheld. Circuit Judge Van Antwerpen wrote for the unanimous panel.

Banks' first two claims had been questions of first impression for the circuit. Other appellate circuits had considered whether Rule 32(h) required notice of contemplation for a variance in the wake of the Supreme Court's holding the previous year in United States v. Booker that the Federal Sentencing Guidelines were purely advisory, and come to differing conclusions in mostly unpublished opinions. A district court under the circuit's jurisdiction had held that the criminal forfeiture provisions of the mail fraud statute only applied to cases where a financial institution had been among the victims, but that decision was not appealed and thus did not constitute precedent.

=== Contemplated variance ===
Since Banks had not raised the objection that the court had failed to provide prior notice of the contemplated upward variance at the time of his actual sentencing, the appeals court was limited to plain error as its standard of review, Van Antwerpen wrote. Under that standard, the alleged error of the lower court would have to be very obvious and serious enough to have conceivably affected the outcome of the proceeding.

Van Antwerpen began by noting that Rule 32(h) had been passed by Congress in response to the Supreme Court's 1991 holding in Burns v. United States that courts did not have discretion to depart upward from the guidelines, which then had the force of law, without notifying the parties. But since Booker had held that the guidelines were advisory, courts were freer to adjust sentences as long as they started from a range derived from the guidelines. "Thus, district courts continue to consider all grounds properly advanced by the parties at sentencing, as they did in the past," the judge wrote. That included all the factors that had always been present in the statute governing sentencing.

Before Booker, defendants had had firmer reasons to expect a sentence within the guidelines. Hence, Rule 32(h) was passed after Burns, requiring that courts give prior notice of a contemplated departure "on any grounds." Van Antwerpen quoted the Seventh Circuit, which had recalled the "unfair surprise" that led to Burns in reaching a similar conclusion about the applicability of Rule 32(h) to contemplated variances prior to Booker. Since the guidelines were now advisory, a court could consider grounds other than those outlined for departures, including the factors in the statute, which had not been repealed.

"Accordingly, given that defendants are aware that courts will consider the broad range of factors set forth in [the law] at sentencing, we perceive none of the 'unfair surprise' considerations that motivated the enactment of Rule 32(h)," Van Antwerpen wrote. Chondos, he added, had conceded the point during oral argument. "[R]equiring advance notice of "any ground" beyond the factors set forth in [statute] would undoubtedly prove to be unworkable." He ended that portion of the opinion by affirming another recent Third Circuit holding that continued, post-Booker, to require prior notice of a contemplated departure from the guidelines and admonished district courts to state explicitly whether any adjustments to sentences they made outside the ranges fixed by the guidelines were variances or departures.

=== In personam forfeiture ===
The federal mail fraud statute authorized civil forfeiture as a punishment for any conviction, and criminal in personam forfeiture for "special circumstances" frauds that victimized a financial institution. As part of the Civil Asset Forfeiture Reform Act of 2000 (CAFRA), Congress had added language allowing federal prosecutors to request, upon presentment of the indictment or information bringing the charges, criminal forfeiture for any crime punishable by civil forfeiture where criminal forfeiture was not specifically authorized. The government had done so in this case, but Banks argued that the "special circumstances" provisions of the mail fraud statute controlled, barring it from having that request granted where the fraudulent scheme had not victimized a financial institution.

Since it was a question of law, the court exercised plenary review. Van Antwerpen considered two district court opinions that came to opposite conclusions on the question. Within the Third Circuit, Judge Stewart Dalzell of the Eastern District of Pennsylvania had denied a government request for criminal forfeiture in United States v. Croce, a mail fraud case involving three defendants who had charged Blue Cross/Blue Shield $14 million for goods and services they never provided, following Banks' logic. But in the Second Circuit, Judge Arthur Donald Spatt of the Eastern District of New York had in a similar case of textile manufacturers who defrauded insurers and creditors dismissed that argument as "add[ing] qualifying language that is simply not in the statute."

To resolve the conflicting interpretations, Van Antwerpen began with the plain meaning of CAFRA.

Criminal forfeiture is not permitted unless (1) a substantive provision exists for civil forfeiture of the criminal proceeds at issue; and (2) there is no specific statutory provision that permits criminal forfeiture of such proceeds. Thus, we read the statute ... [as permitting] criminal forfeiture when no criminal forfeiture provision applies to the crime charged against a particular defendant but civil forfeiture for that charged crime is nonetheless authorized.

In Croce, Dalzell had said it was "highly unlikely that, in passing the broad language of [CAFRA], Congress intended to silently remove the limitations on criminal forfeiture in mail fraud cases." While that "presents a plausible construction of the statute, we are not persuaded," Van Antwerpen commented. CAFRA stated that "a forfeiture is authorized in connection with a violation of an Act of Congress"

Van Antwerpen pointed to the federal money laundering statute, which Banks had also been convicted of violating. It included a long list of offenses under which civil forfeiture was permitted, which further included by reference a similar list of crimes in the Racketeer Influenced and Corrupt Organizations Act that specifically included mail fraud without limiting it to mail fraud affecting financial institutions. He read "this chain of cross-references" to "explicitly permit criminal forfeiture for general mail fraud, not just for mail fraud against financial institutions."

The text of the statutes may have been ambiguous when read by themselves, allowing for Dalzell's Croce interpretation. But Van Antwerpen believed the statute's legislative history justified the court's more expansive reading in the instant case. A House committee's report on the bill had explicitly stated that its goal was "to extend proceeds forfeiture (both civil and criminal) to the crimes enumerated in the money laundering statute." Congress had also removed the language restricting criminal forfeiture to mail and wire frauds affecting financial institutions from the list of crimes for which forfeiture was authorized, he noted. "In our view, Van Antwerpen concluded, "Congress's expansion of the crimes for which civil forfeiture is available taken in conjunction with its decision to enact [legislation] which broadened the range of crimes for which criminal forfeiture was available, can only be viewed as intent to make criminal forfeiture essentially coextensive with civil forfeiture."

=== Other issues ===
In an earlier ruling in Croce, Dalzell had similarly held that a criminal forfeiture judgement for more than the defendant had was not authorized by the statute and contrary to the history of how forfeiture had evolved in American law. Other precedent in the Third Circuit and elsewhere, Van Antwerpen noted, held clearly that the government was entitled to ask for, and receive, a forfeited amount equal to what it determined to be the full proceeds of the criminal activity without regard to the defendant's actual holdings as of the sentencing. "[A]dopting Banks's position would permit defendants who unlawfully obtain proceeds to dissipate those proceeds and avoid liability for their ill-gotten gains," he observed.

Addressing Banks' other claims, which he had not raised at trial, Van Antwerpen found no plain error. The government's unrebutted testimony from a Microsoft antipiracy specialist that Banks' copies of their products were unauthorized, that they were probably covered by the company's copyrights and that he had been sent cease and desist letters was enough to establish that the products were copyrighted. An existing circuit precedent held that jury instructions that described the elements of the offense in the disjunctive when the indictment used the conjunctive, as Banks' had, did not constructively amend the indictment. Likewise, he upheld the witness tampering instruction since it had clearly referenced any proceeding including a grand jury, and Banks' reference to a subpoena in his email to Do indicated he was aware of the ongoing grand jury proceeding.

Van Antwerpen considered Banks' claim that he had been improperly denied his request to represent himself under plenary review. He interpreted the denied motion, one of many Banks filed during the trial, as too equivocal to have been worthy of serious consideration by the court, more an expression of Banks' frustration that the prosecutor could only talk to his attorney and not to Banks directly. Lastly, since Banks did not file his motion for Judge Thomas Hardiman to recuse himself over the complaint, one of many pro se motions he made over the course of the trial, until after he was sentenced, Banks could not raise it on appeal.

== Subsequent jurisprudence ==
The following year the Third Circuit heard United States v. Ausburn, in which a Pittsburgh-area police detective convicted of using a telephone and computer to engage in illicit sexual activity with a minor received a 12-year sentence, twice that suggested by the guidelines. He, too, had not received notice that the court was contemplating this variance, and raised that issue on appeal. Unlike Banks, he claimed this violated the Due Process Clause. Writing for the panel, Judge Louis H. Pollak of the Eastern District of Pennsylvania concluded that the reasoning behind Vampire Nation defeated that claim as well.
