= United States v. Lee =

United States v. Lee may refer to either of the following United States Supreme Court decisions:

- United States v. Lee, 106 U.S. 196 (1882), a decision ruling that prohibition on lawsuits against the federal government did not extend to officers of the government themselves
- United States v. Lee, 274 U.S. 559 (1927), a prohibition-era decision allowing the U.S. Coast Guard to search and seize vessels outside U.S. territorial waters if the occupants are suspected of consuming or transporting alcohol
- United States v. Lee, 455 U.S. 25 (1982), a decision ruling that an Amish group who are religiously opposed to the national Social Security system are not exempt from the requirement
