= Biddle v. Perovich =

- Supreme Court of the United States

Argued May 2, 1927 Decided May 31, 1927
- Full case name: Biddle, Warden v. Perovich
- Citations: 274 U.S. 480 (more) 47 S. Ct. 664; 71 L. Ed. 1161; 1927 U.S. LEXIS 45; 52 A.L.R. 832

Court membership
- Chief Justice William H. Taft Associate Justices Oliver W. Holmes Jr. · Willis Van Devanter; James C. McReynolds · Louis Brandeis; George Sutherland · Pierce Butler; Edward T. Sanford · Harlan F. Stone

Case opinion
- Majority: Holmes, joined by Van Devanter, McReynolds, Brandeis, Sutherland, Butler, Sanford, Stone
- Taft took no part in the consideration or decision of the case.

Biddle v. Perovich, 274 U.S. 480 (1927), was a United States Supreme Court case in which the Court held that under his power "to grant reprieves and pardons for offenses against the United States" (Article II, Section 2), the President may commute a sentence of death to life imprisonment without the convict's consent. This was a modification of the result in Burdick v. United States, 236 U.S. 79, limited page 274 U.S. 486. Response to a certificate of questions from the circuit court of appeals, arising upon review of a judgment of the district court in habeas corpus discharging Perovich from the Leavenworth Penitentiary.
