= Criminal syndicalism =

Criminal syndicalism has been defined as a doctrine of criminal acts for political, industrial, and social change. These criminal acts include advocation of crime, sabotage, violence, and other unlawful methods of terrorism. Criminal syndicalism laws were enacted to oppose economic radicalism.

== Background ==
Idaho legislation defines it as "the doctrine which advocates crime, sabotage, violence, or other unlawful methods of terrorism as a means of accomplishing industrial or political reform". Key terms in criminal syndicalism statutes had vague definitions. Criminal syndicalism became a matter of public attention during and after the World War I period, and has been used to stymie the efforts of radical labor movements.

During the 1910s, federal, state, and local government officials were hostile towards leftist ideologies and deemed social radicalism un-American. Government officials on the state and federal level ordered arrests, imprisonments and killings of people who challenged industrial capitalism or made militant demands under the pre-existing economic structure. By the year 1933, over 700 convictions of criminal syndicalism were made. Organizations like the American Civil Liberties Union believe laws on criminal syndicalism were aimed to punish doctrines or memberships in unions.

=== Industrial Workers of the World ===
Criminal syndicalism laws were enacted to combat the efforts of radical labor unions. The Industrial Workers of the World (IWW) is one such union in particular. Defining the labor efforts as criminal allowed for the government to stop the Wobblies' activities and the labor problem of World War I and post World War I altogether. Senator W.G. Walker of Idaho, the nation's first state to enact a criminal syndicalism law, introduced the criminal syndicalism legislation to the Senate with an anti-IWW speech.

The IWW's confrontational rhetoric factored into public concerns. The organization used "sabotages" and military tactics in its invocation of social change. The public assumed the IWW promoted violence and destruction of properties even though the IWW did not share these intentions. The IWW's later attempts at reducing enforcement efforts through distancing itself from this doctrine were unsuccessful.

The IWW's opposition to United States’ involvement in World War I was in contrast of public sentiment, leading to an unfavorable public opinion towards the organization.

Patriotic societies alleged that German gold financed IWW operations, and that the organization received support from hostile nations.

The red scare exacerbated public distrust and fear against all radical leftist organizations, including the IWW. Strikes (involving over 4 million workers) across the nation increased negative sentiments against these organizations. Various bombings and bombing plots attributed to radical leftists caused the public to view radical leftist organizations as threats to state security.

While repressions against the IWW through government actions and vigilantism were rampant, the public continued to perceive efforts to suppress the organization as insufficient.

The defense by the IWW's General Defense Committee in the case of Fiske v. Kansas resulted in a critically important 1924 Supreme Court ruling which led to the decline of criminal syndicalism laws as a factor in legislative anti-union initiatives.

== Legislation ==
=== History ===
US state government legislation has been made to address criminal syndicalism according to their own definitions. States enacted criminal laws, the first of which was enacted in Idaho in 1917, or sedition law (operating basically in the same way as criminal syndicalism laws).

During World War I and post-World War I, more than half the states passed these anti-radical statutes, most of which still remain in effect today.

By 1935, there were a number of 33 states with remaining criminal syndicalism laws or sedition laws. Between the years 1918 and 1919 Montana, South Dakota, Nebraska, and fourteen other states passed criminal syndicalism laws and between 1917 and 1923 thirteen states enacted sedition laws. Those states without Criminal Syndicalism laws or sedition laws during this period are noted to have had some similar already existing statutes against incitement and rebellion.

The degree of the consequences range from state to state. Criminal Syndicalism laws called for maximum fines of $10,000 and a maximum 25-year prison sentence. Prosecutions under Criminal syndicalism laws ensued. The California Criminal Syndicalism Act of 1919 alone, only five years after its enactment, was responsible for over 500 arrests and 164 convictions.

This act was upheld by the United States Supreme Court on May 16, 1927, in the Whitney v. California case. The power of law against criminal syndicalism began to falter by the 1930s as the courts began to overturn convictions as either being no true threat to the US or by declaring the laws to be too vague or broad. One such example was the court's overturning of the conviction of Dirk DeJonge due to protesting the police brutality in the longshoreman's strike, as violating Oregon's criminal syndicalism law.

=== Idaho ===
On February 19, 1917, the criminal syndicalism bill was introduced into the Idaho state legislature.

Businesses which stood to lose the most at the hands of the IWW, including lumber and mining interests, lobbied for the statute's enactment. In March 1917, the Idaho state government enacted the statute. The Idaho criminal syndicalism bill served as a prototype for many other similar bills passed in various state legislatures in the following four years.

Initially, the rhetoric behind criminal syndicalism laws appealed strictly to business interests. After the United States entered the World War I, then Governor of Idaho Moses Alexander instilled nationalist rhetoric into the public discourse of the law while referring to the IWW's opposition against United States’ participation in the war.

In 1925, the Idaho legislature enacted a bill which outlawed non-violent attempts of sabotage; "work done in an improper manner, slack work, waste of property, and loitering at work" became illegal acts. Organized labor opposed the amendment because the expanded definition of sabotage might be applied against recognized trade union practices.

Several Supreme Court rulings later limited the applicability of criminal syndicalism laws in Idaho, and criminal syndicalism laws in Idaho became a dead issue.

=== California ===
Criminal syndicalism in California was defined as "any doctrine or precept advocating . . . the commission of crime, sabotage . . . or unlawful acts of force and violence . . . as a means of accomplishing a change in industrial ownership or control, or effecting any political change." Knowingly associating oneself with a group which advocates, teaches, or aids and abets criminal syndicalism could also lead to criminal liability under the California statute.

Violators could be punished by up to fourteen years in jail.

The bill's enactment came after a series of events undermining IWW's public image.

On July 22, 1916, a bomb exploded in the Preparedness Day parade in San Francisco. It led to the arrests of Warren K Billings and Thomas Mooney – both of whom were associated with militant labor movement – and two others. The San Francisco public responded with an uproar.

Fresno and Riverside agricultural strikes took place in 1917, months preceding the California criminal syndicalism bill's first introduction.

The first attempt of inducting the criminal syndicalism bill into the California law took place in 1917. The bill was a copy of the Idaho statute. Legislators found the term "sabotage" in the bill ambiguous and did not pass the bill.

In the same year, the federal government increased crackdowns against IWW on suspicion of the organization's financial ties with foreign hostiles. The Department of Justice conducted raids on IWW headquarters across the country, including bases in San Francisco, Los Angeles and Fresno.

In addition to the protests, IWW was accused of sabotaging Fresno farmers by burning hay stacks and covering raisins with dirt. The Department of Justice opened its Fresno branch in response. The California State Federation of Labor also issued a condemnation of IWW. These events coincided with the bombing of the governor's residence at Sacramento, which led to arrests of IWW members. The press began to pose a negative attitude towards IWW.

From 1917 to 1919, tension between capital and labor grew. Strikes and IWW activities in key wartime industries increased. The California public invoked a patriotic sentiment and saw IWW as an enemy.

In January 1919, Senator William Kehoe made the second introduction of the criminal syndicalism bill in California. The introduction came five days after the trial of the Governor's residence bombing, possibly to drown out opposition to the bill.

Governor William Stephens recommended measures to check IWW propaganda in the bill. Legislators included his proposed amendment in the final bill.

The proposed bill would outlaw labor organization which conduct strikes or boycotts with the intent of changing industrial ownership and control or causing any political change.

Representatives of organized labor, while supportive of the bill's intent to reduce IWW influences, believed the bill could be used to imprison labor leaders should strikes or boycotts be used in industrial disputes. Labor leaders proposed an amendment which defined the punishable offense more definitely. The amendment failed to pass.

Governor Stephens signed the bill containing his proposed clause into law on April 30, 1919.

=== Kansas ===
The defense by the IWW's General Defense Committee in the case of Fiske v. Kansas resulted in a critically important 1924 Supreme Court ruling which led to the decline of criminal syndicalism laws as a factor in legislative anti-union initiatives.

In 1924, Kansas' state criminal syndicalism law was challenged by a Supreme Court ruling in the case of Fiske v. Kansas, which would become critically important in the future of legal battles over freedom of speech, and which was an early case supported by the American Civil Liberties Union. The ruling overturned the conviction of Harold B. Fiske, an organizer affiliated with the Industrial Workers of the World's Agricultural Workers Industrial Union.

=== Ohio ===
During the 1960s, a leader of the Ku Klux Klan named Clarence Brandenburg gave a speech at a Klan rally. He was later prosecuted under Ohio's criminal syndicalism law and was found guilty. The State relied on film from the rally which showed abhorrent messages denigrating black people and Jews as well as several articles including firearms and ammunition to make their case against Brandenburg. Brandenburg's prosecution and conviction demonstrated willingness by the state of Ohio to use the criminal syndicalism law to target any movement they perceived as radical or violent and not just socialist movements. The Supreme Court ruled in 1969 that Ohio's criminal syndicalism law used to prosecute Brandenburg was unconstitutional.

=== In 2013 ===
The states who still have criminal syndicalism statutes in 2013 are:

- Montana ("M.C.A. 45-8-105".)
- Nevada ("N.R.S. 203.117".)
- Oklahoma ("O.S. 21-1261". to "O.S. 21-1264".) (Note: "O.S. 21-1327". Archived from the original on 2013-09-27. only applies in the schools.)
- Utah ("U.C. 76-8-901". Archived from the original on 2013-09-28. to "U.C. 76-8-904". Archived from the original on 2013-09-28.)

Moreover:

- California allows the firing of teachers involved in "commi[ting], aiding, or advocating the commission of acts of criminal syndicalism, as prohibited by Chapter 188 of the Statutes of 1919, or in any amendment thereof."
- Kansas allows, by an artifact disposition, the issuance of subpoenas for "any alleged violation in this state pertaining to terrorism, illegal use of weapons of mass destruction,..., criminal syndicalism"
- Minnesota allows courts and state executive to interviene in labor actions "where criminal syndicalism, or the acts constituting the same, are involved".

== Constitutionality ==
Some argued that criminal syndicalism laws violated the United States Constitution.

In Whitney v. California, 274 U.S. 357 (1927), the Supreme Court held that California's law suppressing speech advocating criminal acts against the state did not violate the right to freedom of speech as enumerated in the First Amendment, since it encouraged a bad tendency in listeners. The Supreme Court, however, in Brandenburg v. Ohio, 395 U.S. 444 (1969), overturned the holding in Whitney. The Court replaced the "bad tendency" test" with an "imminent lawless" test. The Court invalidated the Ohio Criminal Syndicalism act, as violative of the first amendment, because the act criminalized speech that did not incite lawless action.

== See also ==
- Criminal anarchy in the United States
- Red scare
