= United States v. Lee (1927) =

- Supreme Court of the United States

Argued March 8, 1927 Decided May 31, 1927
- Full case name: United States v. Lee, et al.
- Citations: 274 U.S. 559 (more) 47 S. Ct. 746; 71 L. Ed. 1202

Case history
- Prior: Lee v. United States, 14 F.2d 400 (1st Cir. 1926)

Holding
- If probable cause exists to believe that a vessel and persons in it are violating U.S. revenue laws, the Coast Guard may seize, board, and search the vessel beyond the U.S. territorial waters and the high seas 12 miles outward from the coast. (reversing the decision of the United States Court of Appeals for the First Circuit)

Court membership
- Chief Justice William H. Taft Associate Justices Oliver W. Holmes Jr. · Willis Van Devanter; James C. McReynolds · Louis Brandeis; George Sutherland · Pierce Butler; Edward T. Sanford · Harlan F. Stone

Case opinion
- Majority: Brandeis, joined by unanimous

Laws applied
- §§ 591 and 593 of the Tariff Act of 1922

United States v. Lee, 274 U.S. 559 (1927), is a significant decision by the United States Supreme Court protecting prohibition laws. The Court held 1) the Coast Guard may seize, board, and search vessels beyond the U.S. territorial waters and the high seas 12 miles outward from the coast if probable cause exists to believe that the vessel and persons in it are violating U.S. revenue laws, and 2) the Coast Guard's use of searchlights to view contents of a vessel on the high seas does not constitute a search and thus does not warrant Fourth Amendment protections.

== Background ==
On the night of February 16, 1925, a Coast Guard patrol followed a motor boat owned by Lee from the Gloucester, Massachusetts harbor to a region commonly spoken of as Rum Row which was located approximately 24 miles east of Boston Light (a lighthouse located on Little Brewster Island in outer Boston Harbor, Massachusetts). The patrol approached the motor boat and turned on a searchlight upon reaching the boat. With the help of the searchlight, the patrol observed Lee with two associates (McNeil and Vieria) and 71 cases of grain alcohol. The three defendants were arrested and transported to Boston where they were indicted for conspiring to violate sections of the Tariff Act of 1922 and National Prohibition Act.

The National Prohibition Act was enacted to support enforcement of the Eighteenth Amendment to the United States Constitution, which established a nationwide prohibition. The act provided that "no person shall manufacture, sell, barter, transport, import, export, deliver, or furnish any intoxicating liquor except as authorized by this act." It did not specifically prohibit the use of intoxicating liquors. The act defined intoxicating liquor as any beverage containing more than 0.5% alcohol.

The Tariff Act of 1922 prohibits the import of liquor into the United States and authorizes the Coast Guard to seize, board, and search any vessel suspected to U.S revenue laws.

U.S. territorial waters are 12 miles outward from any US coast. The motor boat was seized outside of this twelve-mile territory; therefore, Lee and his co-defendants sued for a writ of error claiming the Coast Guard did not have jurisdiction to board their vessel in international waters. The case was brought before the United States Court of Appeals for the First Circuit which agreed with the defendants and set aside the conviction. The government appeals the Appellate Court's decision to the Supreme Court.

== Decision ==
The case was heard before the Supreme Court on March 8, 1927. On May 31, 1927, Justice Louis Brandeis delivered the unanimous opinion of the Court. The Court held the Coast Guard has authority to visit, search and seize an American vessel on the high seas beyond the twelve-mile limit when probable cause exists to believe that U.S. laws are being violated; that it has authority also to arrest persons on such vessel when there is reason to believe those persons are engaged in committing a felony. The Court also held that the use of a searchlight does not constitute a search and thus does not warrant Fourth Amendment protections because the use of a searchlight is comparable to the use of binoculars. The courts have long held that binoculars are not prohibited by the Constitution.
