= Whitney v. California =

- Supreme Court of the United States

Argued October 6, 1925 Reargued March 18, 1926 Decided May 16, 1927
- Full case name: Charlotte Anita Whitney v. People of the State of California
- Citations: 274 U.S. 357 (more) 47 S. Ct. 641; 71 L. Ed. 1095; 1927 U.S. LEXIS 1011

Case history
- Prior: Defendant convicted, Superior Court of Alameda County, California; affirmed, 207 P. 698 (Cal. Ct.App, 1922); review denied, Supreme Court of California, 6-24-22; dismissed for want of jurisdiction, 269 U.S. 530 (1925); rehearing granted, 269 U.S. 538 (1925)
- Subsequent: None

Holding
- Defendant's conviction under California's criminal syndicalism statute for membership in the Communist Labor Party did not violate her free speech rights as protected under the Fourteenth Amendment, because states may constitutionally prohibit speech tending to incite crime, disturb the public peace, or threaten the overthrow of government by unlawful means.

Court membership
- Chief Justice William H. Taft Associate Justices Oliver W. Holmes Jr. · Willis Van Devanter; James C. McReynolds · Louis Brandeis; George Sutherland · Pierce Butler; Edward T. Sanford · Harlan F. Stone

Case opinions
- Majority: Sanford, joined by Taft, Van Devanter, McReynolds, Sutherland, Butler, Stone
- Concurrence: Brandeis, joined by Holmes

Laws applied
- U.S. Const. amend. XIV; California Criminal Syndicalism Act
- Overruled by
- Brandenburg v. Ohio, 395 U.S. 444 (1969)

Whitney v. California, 274 U.S. 357 (1927), was a United States Supreme Court decision upholding the conviction of an individual who had engaged in speech that raised a clear and present danger to society. While the majority of the Supreme Court justices voted to uphold the conviction, the ruling has become an important free speech precedent due to a concurring opinion by Justice Louis Brandeis recommending new perspectives on criticism of the government by citizens. The ruling was explicitly overruled by Brandenburg v. Ohio in 1969.

== Background ==
Anita Whitney, a member of a distinguished California family, was convicted under the 1919 California Criminal Syndicalism Act for allegedly helping to establish the Communist Labor Party of America, a group accused by the state of advocating the violent overthrow of the American government. Whitney was arrested in November 1919 after giving a speech in Oakland to attract financial support for the California chapter of the party.

Whitney denied that it had been the intention of her or other organizers for the party to become an instrument of violence. In February 1920, Whitney was tried at the Alameda County Superior Court and was found guilty of four counts of criminal syndicalism. She was sentenced to one to fourteen years at San Quentin Penitentiary, but was released after eleven days upon posting a bond and presenting evidence of poor health. Whitney attempted several appeals within the California state court system, arguing against the applicability of the state's 1919 statute, but without success. Her petition to the California Supreme Court was denied. Whitney then adopted an argument based on the due process and equal protection clauses of the Fourteenth Amendment to the U.S. Constitution, claiming that her speech was punished differently than the speech of others due to the subject matter. Whitney petitioned to the United States Supreme Court to review her criminal conviction, and the high court agreed to hear the case in March 1926.

== Supreme Court ruling ==
The question before the court was whether the Criminal Syndicalism Act in California violated the due process and equal protection clauses of the Fourteenth Amendment. The court unanimously upheld Whitney's criminal conviction, with seven Justices joining the majority opinion and two issuing a concurring opinion. Justice Edward T. Sanford wrote the majority opinion, holding that Whitney's speech in Oakland justified a police response under the bad tendency test.

The court held that the state, in exercising its police power, has the power to punish those who abuse their rights to freedom of speech "by utterances inimical to the public welfare, tending to incite crime, disturb the public peace, or endanger the foundations of organized government and threaten its overthrow." In other words, speech with a "bad tendency" can be punished. Thus, the state's police power toward this type of speech did not conflict with the Fourteenth Amendment. Whitney's criminal conviction was upheld.

=== Brandeis's concurrence ===
Brandeis wrote a concurring opinion, joined by Holmes, that many scholars have lauded as perhaps the greatest defense of freedom of speech ever written by a member of the Supreme Court. Justices Louis Brandeis and Oliver Wendell Holmes concurred with the majority on the question before the Supreme Court about possible violations of the Fourteenth Amendment. However, they then went on to consider the unintended ramifications of the Court's decision for free speech. Scholars have discussed the question of why the opinion is styled as a concurrence rather than as a dissent, with the most common conclusion being that the First Amendment issue had not been raised at trial sufficiently to qualify as an issue before the Court for decision. A minority argues instead that Brandeis was merely adapting his unpublished opinion in the mooted 1926–27 Ruthenberg v. Michigan case to his law clerk James M. Landis' argument that Whitney did not have jurisdiction.

Brandeis deviated significantly from prevailing judicial thought on the First Amendment, and applied free speech to the democratic process. He held that citizens have an obligation to take part in the governing process, and they cannot do so unless they can discuss and criticize governmental policy fully and without fear. If the government can punish unpopular views, it cramps freedom. In the long run, that will strangle democratic processes. Thus, free speech is not only an abstract virtue but also a key element at the heart of a democratic society.

Brandeis also suggested a reappraisal of the prevailing clear and present danger test, and insisted on what some have called a "time to answer" test: speech may only be restricted if the danger it creates is so imminent that there is no opportunity for counter-argument or education, arguing that no danger flowing from speech can be considered "clear and present" if there is full opportunity for discussion. Brandeis argued that governments, while having a right to curb truly dangerous expression, must clearly define the nature of that danger. Mere fear of unpopular ideas will not do. In Brandeis's words:

But they [the founding fathers] knew that order cannot be secured merely through fear of punishment for its infraction; that it is hazardous to discourage thought, hope and imagination; that fear breeds repression; that repression breeds hate; that hate menaces stable government; that the path of safety lies in the opportunity to discuss freely supposed grievances and proposed remedies, and that the fitting remedy for evil counsels is good ones. Believing in the power of reason as applied through public discussion, they eschewed silence coerced by law – the argument of force in its worst form. Recognizing the occasional tyrannies of governing majorities, they amended the Constitution so that free speech and assembly should be guaranteed.

== Impact and subsequent events ==
Shortly after the Supreme Court's ruling, Anita Whitney was pardoned by the Governor of California based on Justice Brandeis' concurring opinion. Philippa Strum, of the Woodrow Wilson International Center for Scholars, asserted that Whitney was a pacifist who believed in working within the American political system. Whitney was, in effect, put on trial for her association with labor groups as well as her own reform activities, which included fighting for equality and advocating for a more equitable political and economic system.

Brandeis's concurrence in the Whitney ruling eventually became more influential than the majority opinion, and hinted toward the rejection of the clear and present danger test. This indeed happened by the 1950s–60s, as the American judiciary transitioned to a focus on the risk of imminent lawless action caused by speech that government officials find inappropriate. This doctrine was solidified by the Supreme Court ruling in Brandenburg v. Ohio in 1969, which explicitly overturned Whitney v. California as a precedent. Constitutional experts have called Brandeis's concurrence a "milestone" for free speech jurisprudence, that upholds "the basic stanchion of our society."

== See also ==
- Clear and present danger
- Brandenburg v. Ohio
