= Hugh W. Sanford =

American businessman and writer (1879–1961)

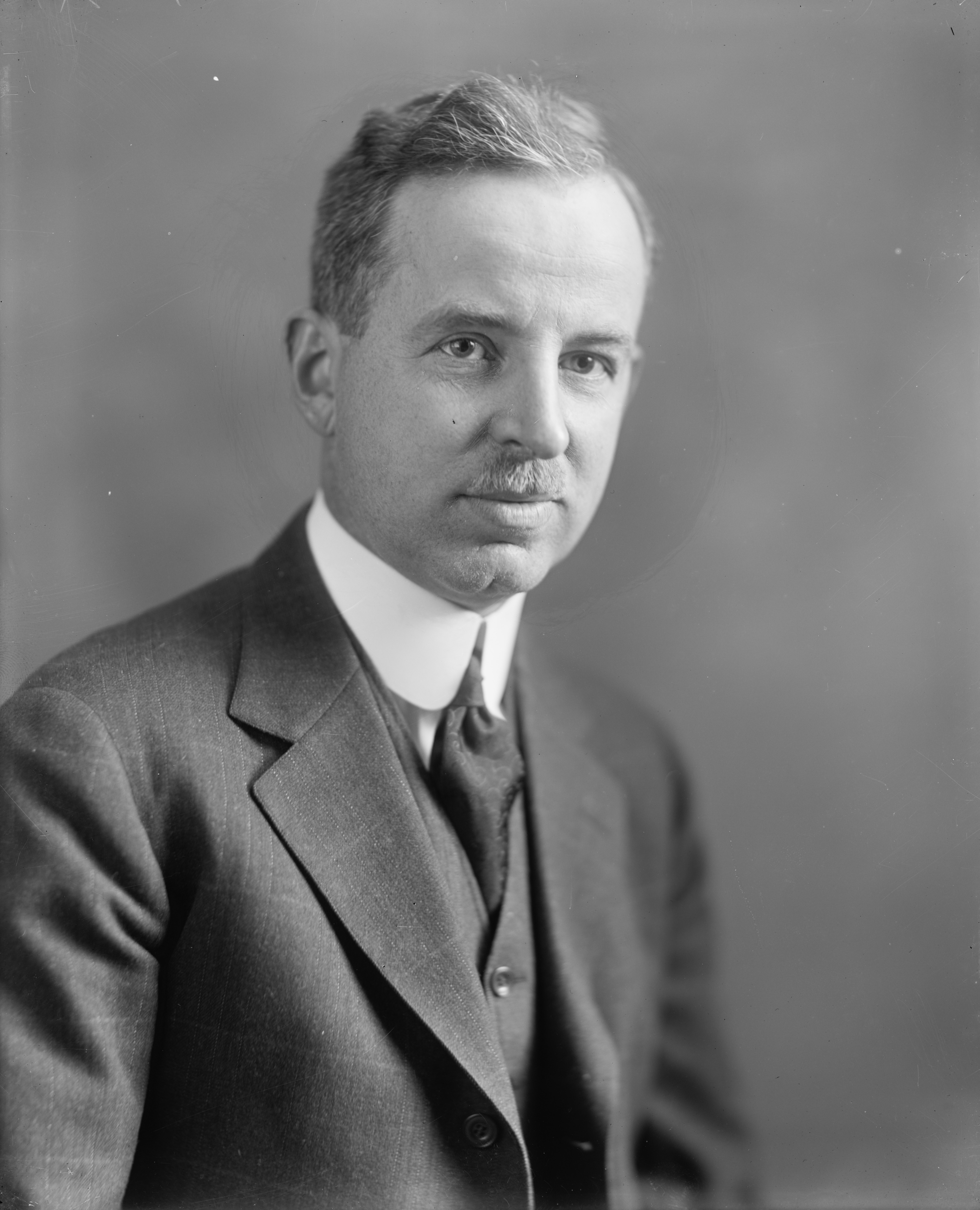
- Sanford, c. 1905
- Born: Hugh Wheeler Sanford; April 22, 1879; Knoxville, Tennessee, U.S.
- Died: November 15, 1961 (aged 82); Knoxville, Tennessee, U.S.
- Resting place: Greenwood Cemetery
- Education: Harvard University (BA)
- Known for: Businessman; writer
- Spouse(s): Margaret Woodruff (m. 1904; died 1947) Anne Kimball (m. 1953)
- Children: 5
- Father: Edward J. Sanford
- Relatives: Edward Terry Sanford (brother); Adrian S. Fisher (nephew); Hubert Fisher (brother-in-law)

Hugh Wheeler Sanford (April 22, 1879 – November 15, 1961) was an American businessman and writer from Knoxville, Tennessee. He was president and chairman of the board of Sanford-Day Iron Works and was chief of the ferro-alloys section of the War Industries Board. He wrote a number of books relating to economics and philosophy.

== Early life ==
Hugh Wheeler Sanford was born on April 22, 1879, in Knoxville, Tennessee, to Emma (née Chavannes) and Edward Jackson Sanford. His father was a newspaperman in Knoxville. He was educated at Baker and Himel School in Knoxville. He graduated magna cum laude with a Bachelor of Arts from Harvard University in 1900. His brothers were U.S. Supreme Court justice Edward Terry Sanford and newspaper publisher Alfred F. Sanford. His nephew was Adrian S. Fisher. His sister married congressman Hubert Fisher.

== Career ==
In 1901, Sanford organized a foundry and machine shop. He would later become president and manager of Sanford-Day Iron Works. He was president of Sanford Investment Company, vice president of Knox Stove Works and the Journal and Tribune Company. He was also associated with the United Equipment Company and the New Imperial Company. He was associated with more than 100 U.S. patents.

Sanford served on the Council of National Defense. On March 22, 1918, he was appointed a member of the War Industries Board. He became chief of the ferro-alloys section of the board. During World War II, he was chairman of the board of two companies manufacturing for the war effort.

Sanford was chairman of the board of Sanford-Day Iron Works and Knoxville Metal Products Company. He was director of Fidelity Bankers Trust Company, Myers-Whaley Company, Kimball's Inc., Sanford Realty Company and Empire Building Association.

== Publications ==
Sanford wrote a number of books on economics and philosophy. He wrote "The Business of Life" (1924), "Economics in a Nutshell" (1931), "A Major Premise of Albert Einstein" (1950) and "Philosophy Leading to Marxism" (1950). In his 1924 book "The Business of Life", Sanford argued that if the United States continues to grow as it has "in another 150 years she will have a population of approximately four billion people". In April 1925, New York Times critic John Corbin praised the book.

== Personal life ==
Sanford married Margaret Woodruff on March 24, 1904. They had three sons and two daughters, Edward Jackson, Margaret Pauline, Hugh Wheeler Jr., Alfred Fanton II and Katherine Woodruff. His wife died in 1947. He married Anne (née Wilson) Kimball in 1953. He was a self-taught pianist. He was a member of the Episcopal Church and a member of the Harvard Club of New York. He was a Republican. His home was on Kingston Pike in Knoxville.

Sanford died following a stroke on November 15, 1961, at Presbyterian Hospital in Knoxville. He was buried in Greenwood Cemetery.
