= The Dirty Works =

American punk rock band

- Origin: Knoxville, Tennessee. U.S.
- Genre: Punk rock
- Years active: 2004–present
- Members: Christopher Scum, Steven Crime, B. Riot
- Past members: Shaggy, Scott Dunlop

The Dirty Works is an American punk rock band from Knoxville, Tennessee, United States.

The band's original lineup consisted of singer Christopher Scum, guitarist Steven Crime, bassist "Shaggy", and drummer B. Riot.

Formed in 2004, their first album, Frogwater Injection, sold over 400 copies (via "official" CD-R, available from the band), despite not being formally released. The band became known for their live performances which typically featured blood and self-abuse. Singer Christopher Scum became known for his purportedly cathartic on-stage antics, such as beating himself with a pair of brass knuckles attached to his microphone.

The band released their second album Biscuits and Liquor in 2006.

From 2006, the band became the focus of a full-length documentary – Rebel Scum The Movie – produced by Atlanta-based company Worldstorm Art Labs. After two years of filming, the movie finally premiered to a private Knoxville audience in January 2010. Opening to a flurry of positive reviews from those present on the night, the film was released on DVD in 2015.

After losing bassist "Shaggy", Scum took over that position and the band continues to perform as a three-piece to this day. Under his Christopher "Scum" soubriquet, Christopher also performs and self-releases solo material. Since the re-release of Fifty Acres of Pain, Christopher Scum has been more successful than ever. On June 27, 2015, Scum, his long-time girlfriend Donna Renee Bailey, and their dog, Mackey were involved in a serious car accident when their SUV was hit from behind by a diesel tanker that jackknifed and exploded. Scum suffered serious burns and was airlifted to a burn center in Augusta, Georgia. His girlfriend Renee and their dog did not survive.
