= Ed Snodderly =

American performer and songwriter (born 1952)

- Born: Eddie Lynn Snodderly; June 23, 1954 (age 72); Knoxville, Tennessee, US
- Genres: New Hillbilly: folk; old-time; roots; americana
- Instruments: Guitar, Fiddle, Banjo, Vocals
- Years active: 1970s - present
- Label: Majestic Records Philo Records
- Member of: Brother Boys
- Website: https://www.edsnodderlymusic.com

Eddie “Ed” Lynn Snodderly (born June 21, 1952) known since the 2020s by the stage name Es Pearl is an American performer and songwriter and co-founder of the Down Home music venue and listening room in Johnson City, Tennessee.

== Biography ==
Snodderly was born and raised in Knoxville, Tennessee. His grandfather was an old-time Appalachian fiddle player, and his father played guitar. His family band played square dances around the East Tennessee area throughout his childhood. Apart from music Snodderly's family consisted of generations of cattle and tobacco farmers.

In the 1970s Snodderly moved to Boston, Massachusetts for a record deal with Philo Records. He then traveled to the west coast of the United States to continue his musical work which would lead to the creation of his debut album “Sidewalk Shoes”, released in 1977. Before the release of this record, Ed Snodderly would return home to East Tennessee and co-found the Down Home music venue. Since opening its doors, the Down Home, seating about 150 people, has hosted many folk heroes such as Townes Van Zandt, Jerry Douglas, and Sam Bush on its small stage.

Ed Snodderly is one of many Appalachian folk musicians to appear in Joel and Ethan Coen's 2000 satirical comedy drama film, O Brother, Where Art Thou? Ed can be seen playing the fiddle as one of the "Village Idiots".

== Career ==
Snodderly has spent a long portion of his career as a songwriter, cowriting and collaborating with the likes of Amythyst Kiah, Malcolm Holcombe, Missy Raines, John Cowan, Sam Bush, and Jerry Douglas.

Snodderly currently teaches Songwriting to undergraduate students and is an Adjunct Faculty Member of the East Tennessee State University Bluegrass, Old-Time, & Roots Music Program in Johnson City, Tennessee.

== Awards ==
- 2014 East Tennessee State University Distinguished Alumnus in the Arts
- 2001 The lyrics to Ed Snodderly's song "Diamond Stream" were permanently inscribed on the wall of The Country Music Hall of Fame in Nashville, Tennessee.
- 2020 Southeast Regional Folk Alliance Lifetime Achievement Award
- 2026 Hermitage Roots and Rhythm Legacy Award

== Discography ==
=== Solo ===
- 1977 Sidewalk Shoes (Fretless)
- 2004 Brier Visions (Majestic Records)
- 2011 Little Egypt & Other Attractions (Majestic Records)
- 2017 Record Shop (Majestic Records)
- 2023 Chimney Smoke

=== With the Brother Boys ===
- 1992 Plow (Sugar Hill Records)
- 1995 Presley’s Grocery (Sugar Hill Records)
- 2022 More Mule

==== Collaborations ====
- "Pearlie Mae" on Jerry Douglas Slide Rule, 1992
- "Majestic" on Sam Bush's King Of My World, 2004
- "Working in the New Mine" on John Cowan's New Tattoo, 2006
- "Basket of Singing Birds" on Missy Raines Record Inside Out, 2009
- "Magnolia" on Missy Raines's Inside Out, 2009
