= Albert Chavannes =

American academic (1836–1903)

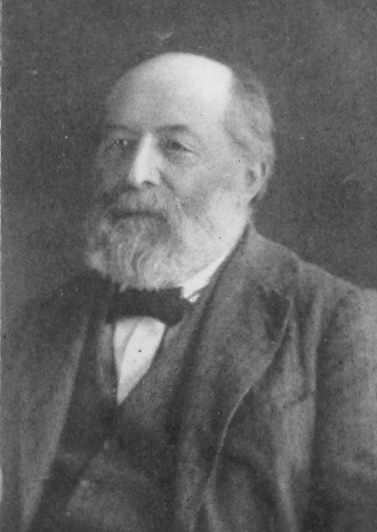
- Born: Albert Chavannes; February 23, 1836; Lausanne, Switzerland
- Died: May 3, 1903 (aged 67); Knoxville, Tennessee
- Resting place: Spring Place Presbyterian Church Cemetery; Knoxville, Tennessee; 36.03046°N 83.86189°W
- Occupations: Author, farmer
- Spouse: Cecile Bolli
- Writing career
- Genres: Utopian fiction, nonfiction
- Notable works: Vital Force and Magnetic Exchange (1888), The Future Commonwealth, or, What Samuel Balcom saw in Socioland (1892), In Brighter Climes, or, Life in Socioland: A Realistic Novel (1895)

Signature
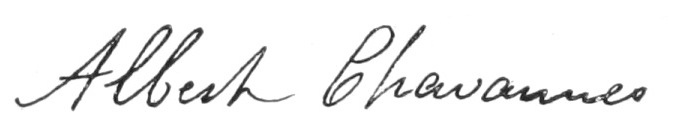

Albert Chavannes (February 23, 1836 – May 3, 1903) was a Swiss-born American author, philosopher, and sociologist, active primarily in the late 19th century. He is best known for his two utopian novels, The Future Commonwealth and In Brighter Climes, which discuss a fictional futuristic society, "Socioland," where the economy is governed by socialist ideals rather than capitalism, and where morality is based on social scientific experimentation, rather than traditional religion. Chavannes was also one of the earliest social theorists to extensively discuss exchange theory, and his ideas on "magnetism" (magnetation) influenced writers such as J. William Lloyd and Ida C. Craddock.

== Life ==
Chavannes was born in Lausanne, Switzerland, one of six children of the Reverend Adrian Chavannes and his wife, Anna Francillon. In 1848, the Chavanneses migrated to East Tennessee, which had been advertised as having ample farmland and a climate similar to that of Switzerland. The family initially settled in Wartburg, Tennessee, atop the Cumberland Plateau, but finding the land unsuitable for farming, soon afterward moved to northern Knox County. By 1855, the Chavanneses had been joined by several other French-speaking Swiss families, comprising one of the county's largest immigrant groups.

Albert Chavannes married fellow French Swiss immigrant Cecile Bolli in 1857, and the two settled down to a life of dairy farming. One of Chavannes' earliest writings was an article entitled, "How Manure Is Made in Switzerland," published in the agricultural journal, The Cultivator, in 1858. This article was inspired by a trip Chavannes had made to his home country the previous year.

During the Civil War, Chavannes supported the Confederacy. He was part of the citizens-guard that defended Knoxville from a raid by Union general William P. Sanders in June 1863, and later provided an account of this raid in his book, East Tennessee Sketches. In 1864, following the occupation of Knoxville by Union forces, Chavannes moved to Berkshire, New York, where he opened a woodworking shop. His experiences in New York would later inspire his novel, Lizzie Melton, A Self-Reliant Girl. In 1870, he moved back to Knox County, where he established a new dairy farm in the Adair Creek area north of Knoxville.

Around the age of 40, Chavannes began questioning the religious traditions with which he was raised, his chief inspiration being the Theory of Evolution. Between 1883 and 1885, Chavannes published a journal, The Sociologist. In the late 1880s, Chavannes began to theorize on emotional and sexual exchanges between humans, which he called "magnetism" (J. William Lloyd, with whom Chavannes had been corresponding, later wrote that he had suggested the term "magnetation" to Chavannes). In 1888, Chavannes published his theories on magnetism in his book, Vital Force and Magnetic Exchange.

By the 1890s Chavannes was exchanging ideas with socialists Lester Frank Ward and Edward Bellamy. In 1892, Chavannes published his first Socioland novel, The Future Commonwealth. That year, Chavannes ran for the state legislature on the Populist ticket, but lost badly. His wife, Cecile, wrote an account of their canvassing trip across rural East Tennessee that was included in their book, East Tennessee Sketches.

Chavannes wrote a non-fiction follow-up to The Future Commonwealth in 1893 entitled, The Concentration of Wealth, and published his second Socioland novel, In Brighter Climes, in 1895. He published several more works on magnetism in the late 1890s. Chavannes died in 1903, and is buried in the Spring Place Presbyterian Church Cemetery in northeast Knoxville.

=== Family ===
Albert Chavannes was related to several prominent Knoxville businessmen, whose careers stand somewhat in contrast to his socialist ideals. His sister, Emma, was married to Edward J. Sanford, one of the city's leading financiers. The Sanford children included Supreme Court justice Edward Terry Sanford and iron manufacturer Hugh Sanford. In 1894, Chavannes' son, Adrian Leon Chavannes (1871–1938), founded the Chavannes Lumber Company, which operated a large mill in North Knoxville until the 1950s. Albert Chavannes' grandson, Edward Chavannes, served as Mayor of Knoxville from 1946 to 1947.

== Works ==
=== Socioland ===
Chavannes' two novels, The Future Commonwealth and In Brighter Climes, discuss a fictional country known as "Socioland." Socioland, according to Chavannes, was located in central Africa, about 300 miles inland along the shores of the fictional Lake Norlay. The new country had been formed circa 1900 by American colonists disenchanted with the ills of American society and the lack of progress in fixing the ills, in spite of the nation's rapidly growing wealth. Though both books are set in the 1950s, Chavannes makes virtually no speculations regarding technological innovations.

In The Future Commonwealth, Socioland is described as a country where major industries and modes of transportation are publicly owned, but controlled by popularly elected directors rather than the central government. Individuals may earn profits, though the accumulation of interest is barred. Land is publicly owned, but leases tantamount to ownership can be granted. All children receive the same educational opportunities, and are required to serve a 6-year apprenticeship. The government provides health care, utilities, bread, and basic services such as laundry. Because work is more evenly divided, individuals only work for a few hours per day.

In Brighter Climes follows Charles Morrill and his wife Mary, who were inspired by Chavannes' The Future Commonwealth to migrate to Socioland. When the Morrills arrive, they find that the Sociolanders are concerned that elements of capitalism are creeping into their economy, and eventually decide to implement a communist-style system. Laws regarding marriage are lax, and divorce is much easier to obtain for both males and females. Artists and writers receive no money for their work, with Sociolanders likening selling one's genius to prostitution. In his introduction to the book, Chavannes states that Mary's letters were written by an "unnamed female," though he wrote the remainder of the book.

=== Magnetism ===
Chavannes used the term "vital force" to describe the intellectual, emotional and sexual energy stored within the body. Intellectual vital force, he believed, is stored in the brain, emotional vital force is stored behind the heart, and sexual vital force is stored in the genitalia. Memory is the result of modifications to a person's vital force.

"Magnetism," according to Chavannes, is the exchange of vital force between two individuals. Intellectual magnetism involves the exchange of thoughts, emotional magnetism involves the exchange of sympathy and affection, and sexual magnetism is exchanged through ejaculation during sexual intercourse. Chavannes believed that individuals require magnetic equilibrium, and suggested that misbehavior and general unpleasantness result from too much or too little stored vital force.

Chavannes argued that the exchange of magnetism through ejaculation ruined an individual's equilibrium. He suggested that individuals therefore practice sexual continence. Chavannes' ideas on sexual magnetism would later provide inspiration for the Karezza method originated by Dr. Alice Bunker Stockham and further developed by J William Lloyd.

=== Other works ===
East Tennessee Sketches is a collection of six articles, two of which ("Canvassing the District" and "Adair Creek Notes") are written by Chavannes' wife, Cecile. "Canvassing the District" describes the Chavanneses' 1892 canvass. "Adair Creek Notes" describes how cheese was made on the Chavannes farm. "Saunders' Raid" is an eyewitness account of General William Sanders's attack on Knoxville in June 1863. "Coming Home to Knoxville" details the Chavannes' trek from the Virginia coast back to Knoxville following a trip to Switzerland in 1897. "An Old Reprobate," is the story of a man who became an alcoholic following the deaths of his two sons from smallpox. "A War Episode" describes the confiscation of Chavannes' prized cane by a Union officer in 1864.

Chavannes considered his 1900 work, Lizzie Melton, A Self-Reliant Girl, to be his only full-fledged novel. The book is essentially a critique of Victorian morals regarding women, with the title character being ostracized by the community after becoming pregnant out of wedlock. The novel is set in Richland, New York, with characters and scenes inspired by Chavannes' experiences in the region following the Civil War.

== Bibliography ==
=== Journals ===
- The Sociologist, 1881–1883
- The Modern Philosopher, 1896–1898

=== Pamphlets ===
- The Law of Happiness
- The Law of Individual Control
- The Law of Exchange
- The Law of Environment
- Heredity, Cross-Breeding, Pre-Natal Influences

=== Books ===
- Vital Force and Magnetic Exchange (1888)
- The Future Commonwealth, Or, What Samuel Balcom Saw in Socioland (1892)
- The Concentration of Wealth: A Study as to Its Causes, Results and Remedies (1893)
- In Brighter Climes, Or, Life in Socioland: A Realistic Novel (1895)
- Vital Force, Magnetic Exchange and Magnetation (1897)
- Magnetism and Its Relation to Health and Character (1898)
- The Nature of the Mind, and Its Relation to Magnetism; Also an Inquiry Whether Individuality Can Persist After Death (1898)
- The Law of Conduct, As Based Upon a Correct Knowledge of the Nature of the Mind (1899)
- East Tennessee Sketches (1900) (coauthored with Cecile Chavannes)
- Lizzie Melton, A Self-Reliant Girl (1900)
- Studies in Sociology, In Four Parts (1901)
- Mental Science, As a Guide to Health, Happiness and Business Success (1902)
