= Edward J. Sanford =

American tycoon and financier (1831 - 1902)

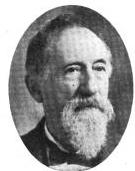
- Photograph from Notable Men of Tennessee (1905)
- Born: Edward Jackson Sanford; November 23, 1831; Fairfield County, Connecticut, U.S.
- Died: October 27, 1902 (aged 70); Knoxville, Tennessee, U.S.
- Resting place: Old Gray Cemetery; Knoxville, Tennessee
- Occupations: Entrepreneur, financier
- Political party: Republican Party
- Spouse: Emma Chavannes
- Children: Edward, Alfred, Hugh, Emma
- Parent(s): John W. Sanford and Altha Fanton
- Relatives: Albert Chavannes (brother-in-law)

Edward Jackson Sanford (November 23, 1831 – October 27, 1902) was an American manufacturing tycoon and financier, active primarily in Knoxville, Tennessee, in the late 19th century. As president or vice president of two banks and more than a half-dozen companies, Sanford helped finance Knoxville's post-Civil War industrial boom and was involved in nearly every major industry operating in the city during this period. Companies he led during his career included Sanford, Chamberlain and Albers, Mechanics' National Bank, Knoxville Woolen Mills, and the Coal Creek Coal Mining and Manufacturing Company.

== Biography ==
=== Early life ===
Sanford was born in Redding, Connecticut, in 1831. He was trained as a carpenter and moved to Knoxville at age 22 to work in this trade. He initially worked for Shepard, Leeds and Hoyts, which built railroad cars. Later in the decade, he cofounded a lumber and construction company. Although many people fled Knoxville during the city's cholera outbreak of 1854, Sanford stayed behind to help care for the sick and dying.

At the outset of the Civil War in November 1861, Sanford helped fellow Unionist William Rule sneak out of Confederate-occupied Knoxville to carry messages to newspaper editor William G. Brownlow, who was in hiding in the mountains. In 1862 Sanford fled to Kentucky to join the Union Army but fell ill before he could enlist (Sanford's account of his escape to Kentucky was later published as an appendix in Thomas William Humes's The Loyal Mountaineers of Tennessee). He returned to Knoxville following Burnside's capture of the city in late 1863. Sanford fought at the Battle of Fort Sanders on November 29, 1863, and years later provided historian Oliver Perry Temple with an account of the battle for Temple's book, East Tennessee and the Civil War.

=== Business interests ===
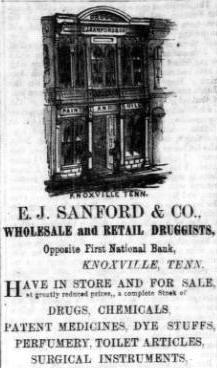
1866 ad for Sanford's store in the Knoxville Whig

Toward the end of the war in 1864, Sanford formed a drug company, E.J. Sanford and Company. In 1872 this company consolidated with a business established by Hiram Chamberlain and A.J. Albers to form Sanford, Chamberlain and Albers. In subsequent years, this company grew to become one of the largest pharmaceutical companies in the South.

During the late 1860s, Sanford helped establish the Coal Creek Mining and Manufacturing Company which purchased over 60,000 acres (240 km^{2}) of land in the coal-rich Coal Creek valley of western Anderson County. This company in turn leased the land to various mining firms, most notably the Knoxville Iron Company and the Tennessee Coal Mining Company (TCMC). In 1891, an uprising known as the Coal Creek War erupted when TCMC attempted to replace its free miners with convict laborers. While Sanford blamed a "fool contract" made by TCMC president B.A. Jenkins for the uprising, he nevertheless supported the use of convict labor as a means to keep regional coal companies competitive.

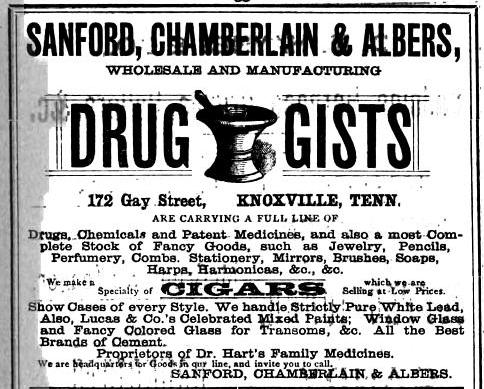
Sanford, Chamberlain and Albers advertisement, 1884

In 1882, Sanford helped organize the Mechanics' National Bank and initially served as the bank's vice president. In October 1882 the bank's first president, Thomas O'Connor, was killed in a notorious shootout in downtown Knoxville. Sanford served as an interim president until Samuel B. Luttrell was elected president of the bank in 1883.

During the late 1880s, Sanford became enamored with social theories regarding the development of a company town, where company workers could live free from the vices that plagued large cities. In 1889, he and his long-time associate Charles McClung McGhee founded the Lenoir City Company with plans to establish such a town. The company purchased the Lenoir estate in Loudon County and platted what is now Lenoir City in 1890. While the Panic of 1893 seriously stunted the city's growth, the city survived, and today part of the city still follows the Lenoir City Company's early-1890s grid.

During the 1880s and 1890s, Sanford served as president of the Knoxville Woolen Mills, which under his leadership had grown to become Knoxville's largest textile firm by 1900. During this same period, he served as a director of several other companies, including the East Tennessee, Virginia and Georgia Railway, the Knoxville Brick Company, and the Knoxville Iron Company. In 1898 Sanford purchased both the Knoxville Journal and the Knoxville Tribune and combined the two into a single newspaper. He retained his Civil War-era associate, William Rule, as the paper's editor.

=== Death and legacy ===
Sanford died at his home in Knoxville on October 27, 1902. He is interred in Old Gray Cemetery. The company he cofounded, Sanford, Chamberlain and Albers, continued operating in Knoxville as Albers, Inc., until 1994. The company's former store and office at 430 South Gay Street still stands and is a contributing property in the National Register of Historic Places-listed Gay Street Commercial Historic District. Maplehurst Park, an apartment complex in downtown Knoxville, is named for Sanford's mansion, Maplehurst, which once stood on the property.

Sanford was a lifelong advocate for education in Knoxville. In 1869, working as an agent for East Tennessee University (now the University of Tennessee), he helped secure for the institution the state's Morrill Act (land-grant) funds. During the same period, he advocated the establishment of a public school system in Knoxville and served as the president of the city's Board of Education in the early 1880s.

Sanford's son, Edward Terry Sanford, was a prominent Knoxville attorney who served as an associate justice of the United States Supreme Court from 1923 until 1930. Another son, Alfred (1875–1946), continued publishing the Knoxville Journal until 1928, when he sold the paper to senator and publisher, Luke Lea. Sanford's son, Hugh (1879–1961), was a Knoxville-area iron manufacturer who advised the War Industries Board and the Council of National Defense during World War I.

== See also ==
- Eldad Cicero Camp
