= Fiske v. Kansas =

- Supreme Court of the United States

Argued May 3, 1926 Decided May 16, 1927
- Full case name: Fiske v. Kansas
- Citations: 274 U.S. 380 (more) 47 S. Ct. 655; 71 L. Ed. 1108

Case history
- Prior: State v. Fiske, 117 Kan. 69, 230 P. 88 (1924)

Holding
- That there being no charge or evidence that the organization advocated any crime, violence, or other unlawful acts or methods as a means of effecting industrial or political changes or revolution, thus applied, the statute is a violation of the Due Process Clause of the Fourteenth Amendment. P. 274 U.S. 386.

Court membership
- Chief Justice William H. Taft Associate Justices Oliver W. Holmes Jr. · Willis Van Devanter; James C. McReynolds · Louis Brandeis; George Sutherland · Pierce Butler; Edward T. Sanford · Harlan F. Stone

Case opinion
- Majority: Sanford, joined by unanimous

Fiske v. Kansas, 274 U.S. 380 (1927), was a United States Supreme Court Case that was first argued May 3, 1926 and finally decided May 16, 1927.

== Background ==
The case began when 26-year-old labor organizer Harold B. Fiske, a Clinton, Washington native, was arrested after being caught with union literature which proclaimed the preamble of the Industrial Workers of the World:

That the working class and the employing class have nothing in common, and that there can be no peace so long as hunger and want are found among millions of working people and the few who make up the employing class have all the good things of life. Between these two classes a struggle must go on until the workers of the world organize as a class, take possession of the earth and the machinery of production and abolish the wage system. Instead of the conservative motto, 'A fair day's wages for a fair day's work,' we must inscribe on our banner the revolutionary watchword, 'Abolition of the wage system.' By organizing industrially we are forming the structure of the new society within the shell of the old.

A Kansas statute defined "criminal syndicalism" as "the doctrine which advocates crime, physical violence, arson, destruction of property, sabotage, or other unlawful acts or methods, as a means of accomplishing or effecting industrial or political ends, or as a means of effecting industrial or political revolution, or for profit . . ." The law was applied by a state court and was charged if the accused in some fashion held these views and formed a group of followers with a similar intent. Fiske was tried and convicted of violating this act, and the judgement was upheld in the Supreme Court of Kansas. He then appealed to the Federal Supreme Court where his case was heard.

== Trial ==
The federal question was whether the Syndicalism Act as applied in this case was repugnant to the due process clause of the Fourteenth Amendment. The state offered no evidence as to the true beliefs and practices of Fiske and his organization. Fiske claimed that his organization in no way sought to bring about industrial change by illegal or criminal means.

The state of Kansas could prove neither that Fiske had any actual or imminent intent to illegally change the economic structure of the United States nor that he intended to overthrow the US government. Fiske's words were thus protected by the First Amendment and so could not be barred.

== Decision ==
The Syndicalism Act was called "an arbitrary and unreasonable exercise of the police power of the State." The law, applied as it had, was found to be a violation of the Due Process Clause of the Fourteenth Amendment. The judgement of the state court was reversed, and Fiske was found to be not in violation of any law.

== Importance ==
This court decision further solidified the importance of the Due Process Clause by ensuring that the state recognize all the legal rights of a person and prevents the government from violating rights without a justifiable and pressing reason to do so. The case would also reinforce the "imminent lawless action" clause of Brandenburg v. Ohio in the future as well as other court cases, which ruled that commitment and imminent intent to act upon the plans was needed to convict someone of a similar criminal violation such as in this case. The case was seen as a victory for proponents of a stronger definition of the First Amendment and protected speech.
