= Edward Terry Sanford =

US Supreme Court justice from 1923 to 1930

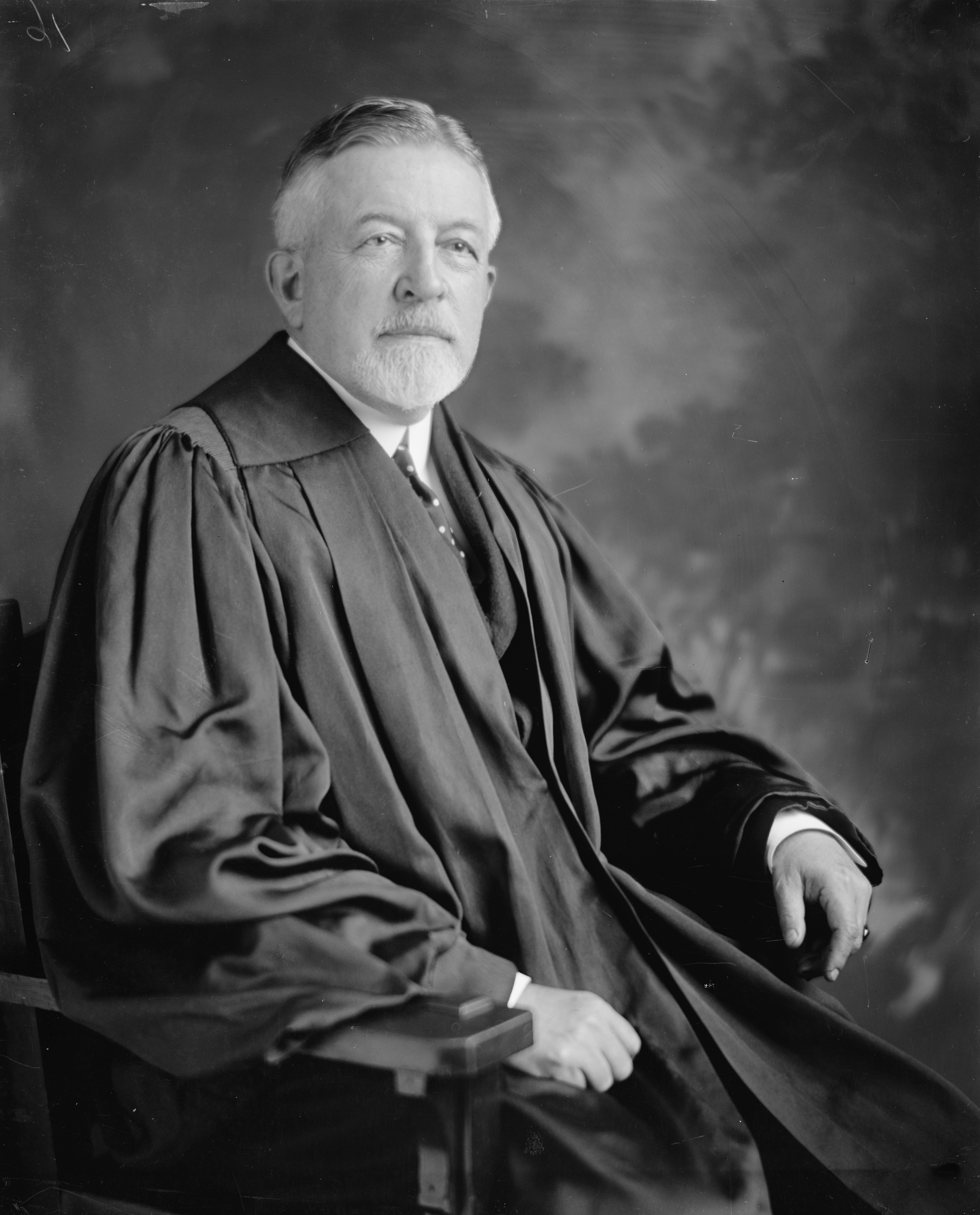
- Sanford, c. 1923-1930

Associate Justice of the Supreme Court of the United States
- In office February 19, 1923 – March 8, 1930
- Nominated by: Warren G. Harding
- Preceded by: Mahlon Pitney
- Succeeded by: Owen Roberts

Judge of the United States District Court for the Eastern District of Tennessee
- In office May 18, 1908 – February 5, 1923
- Nominated by: Theodore Roosevelt
- Preceded by: Charles Dickens Clark
- Succeeded by: Xenophon Hicks

United States Assistant Attorney General
- In office January 4, 1907 – May 18, 1908
- President: Theodore Roosevelt
- Preceded by: William H. Lewis
- Succeeded by: James Alexander Fowler

Personal details
- Born: Edward Terry Sanford; July 23, 1865 Knoxville, Tennessee, U.S.
- Died: March 8, 1930 (aged 64) Washington, D.C., U.S.
- Resting place: Greenwood Cemetery; Knoxville, Tennessee
- Party: Republican
- Spouse: Lutie Woodruff (m. 1891)
- Parent: Edward J. Sanford (father)
- Relatives: Albert Chavannes
- Education: University of Tennessee (BA, BPhil); Harvard University (AB, AM, LLB)

Edward Terry Sanford (July 23, 1865 – March 8, 1930) was an American jurist who served as an associate justice of the Supreme Court of the United States from 1923 until his death in 1930. Prior to his nomination to the high court, Sanford served as a United States Assistant Attorney General under President Theodore Roosevelt from 1905 to 1907, and as a United States district judge of the United States District Court for the Eastern District of Tennessee and the United States District Court for the Middle District of Tennessee from 1908 to 1923. As of July 2026, he is the last sitting district court judge to be elevated directly to the Supreme Court.

A graduate of Harvard Law School, Sanford practiced law in his hometown of Knoxville, Tennessee, during the 1890s and the first decade of the 20th century. As Assistant Attorney General, he rose to national prominence as lead prosecutor during the high-profile trial of Joseph Shipp in 1907, which to date is the only criminal trial conducted by the Supreme Court.

Sanford is typically viewed as a conservative justice, favoring strict adherence to antitrust laws, and often voted with his mentor, Chief Justice William Howard Taft. Sanford's most lasting impact on American law is arguably his majority opinion in the landmark case Gitlow v. New York (1925). This case, which introduced the incorporation doctrine, helped pave the way for many of the Warren Court's decisions expanding civil rights and civil liberties in the 1950s and 1960s.

== Early life and legal career ==
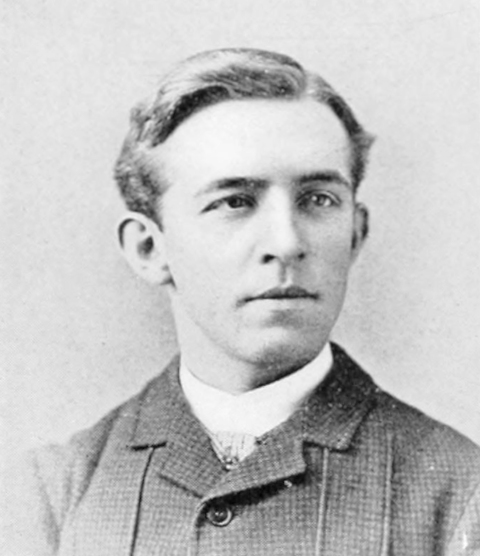
At Harvard, c. 1885

Edward Terry Sanford was born on July 23, 1865 in Knoxville, Tennessee, the eldest son of prominent Knoxville businessman Edward J. Sanford (1831–1902) and Swiss immigrant Emma Chavannes. Sanford's father, as president or vice president of nearly a dozen banks and corporations, was one of the primary driving forces behind Knoxville's late-19th century industrial boom. His maternal grandfather, Adrian Chavannes, was the leader of a group of Swiss colonists who arrived in Tennessee in the late 1840s and his uncle, Albert Chavannes, was a noted author and sociologist. In 1891, Sanford married Lutie Mallory Woodruff, the daughter of Knoxville hardware magnate W. W. Woodruff.

Sanford received a Bachelor of Arts degree and a Bachelor of Philosophy degree from the University of Tennessee in 1883, a Bachelor of Arts degree from Harvard University in 1885, a Master of Arts degree from the same institution in 1889, and a Bachelor of Laws from Harvard Law School in 1889. He was in private practice in Knoxville from 1890 to 1907, and was a lecturer at the University of Tennessee School of Law from 1898 to 1907.

One of Sanford's earliest appearances before the Supreme Court came as an attorney representing the appellant Knoxville Iron Company, in Knoxville Iron Company v. Harbison (1901). The Court ruled in favor of Harbison and upheld states' right to ban companies from paying employees in scrip rather than cash.

== Assistant Attorney General ==
Sanford first served in the government as a special assistant to the Attorney General of the United States from 1905 to 1907, and then as Assistant Attorney General in 1907 under President Theodore Roosevelt.

=== United States v. Shipp ===
As an Assistant Attorney General, he was the lead prosecutor in the high-profile trial in United States v. Shipp (1907). This case involved a sheriff, Joseph Shipp, who was convicted of allowing a condemned black prisoner, who was the subject of a United States Supreme Court writ of habeas corpus, to be lynched. Sanford's conduct of the trial, particularly his exemplary closing argument, are said to be part of a "Great American Trial." It is the only criminal trial conducted before the United States Supreme Court in which the court exercised original jurisdiction (the court typically only hears criminal cases on appeal). It was widely followed in the newspapers. Shipp and several others were later convicted.

== District court service ==
Sanford was nominated by President Theodore Roosevelt on May 14, 1908, to a joint seat on the United States District Court for the Eastern District of Tennessee and the United States District Court for the Middle District of Tennessee vacated by Judge Charles Dickens Clark. He was confirmed by the United States Senate on May 18, 1908, and received his commission the same day. His service terminated on February 5, 1923, due to his elevation to the Supreme Court.

== Supreme Court ==
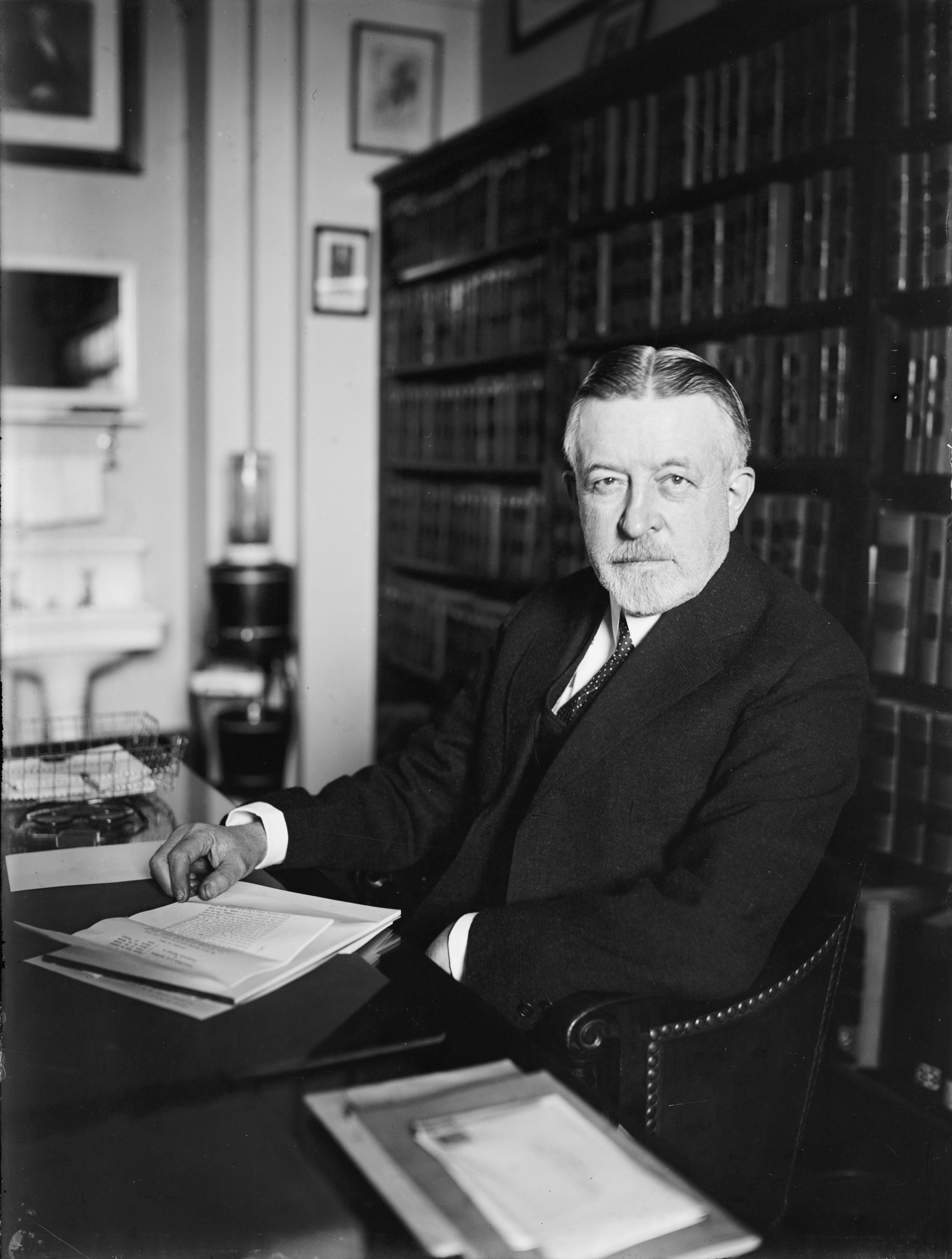
Justice Sanford in his office

President Warren Harding nominated Sanford as an associate justice of the Supreme Court of the United States on January 24, 1923, to succeed Mahlon Pitney. Sanford was confirmed by the Senate by a voice vote on January 29, 1923. Sanford took the judicial oath of office on February 19, 1923. He was Circuit Justice for the Fifth Circuit throughout his tenure on the Court.

=== Notable opinions ===
Sanford wrote 130 opinions during his seven years on the Court. His most well-known was the majority opinion in Gitlow v. New York. While upholding a state law banning anarchist literature, the opinion in Gitlow implied that some provisions of the Bill of Rights (here the First Amendment's free speech provisions) apply with equal force to the states via the Due Process Clause of the Fourteenth Amendment (commonly called "incorporation"). That had "extraordinary consequences for the nationalization of the Bill of Rights during the era of the Warren Court," which later used similar reasoning to incorporate other amendments and expand civil liberties. Gitlow has been cited as precedent in cases such as Near v. Minnesota (1931), which incorporated the guarantee of freedom of the press, Griswold v. Connecticut (1965), which recognized the constitutional right to privacy, and more recently, McDonald v. Chicago (2010), which incorporated the right to bear arms.

Sanford authored the majority opinion in Okanogan Indians v. United States, commonly called the "Pocket Veto Case," which upheld the power of the President's "pocket veto." Other noteworthy opinions by him are Corrigan v. Buckley, 271 U.S. 323 (1926), which upheld the right of property sellers to discriminate based on race, Taylor v. Voss, 271 U.S. 176 (1926) and Fiske v. Kansas, 274 U.S. 380 (1927).

Sanford voted with the majority in Myers v. United States (1926), which upheld the President's authority to remove executive branch officials without the Senate's consent, and in Ex parte Grossman (1925), which recognized the President's pardoning power to extend to conviction for contempt of court. Sanford concurred with Taft's dissent in Adkins v. Children's Hospital (1923).

Chief Justice Taft is considered by some to have been Justice Sanford's mentor. They routinely sided together in decisions and were a part of the Court's conservative "inner club" that regularly met at the Chief Justice's house for libations and conviviality on Sundays.

== Death ==
Justice Sanford unexpectedly died on March 8, 1930, of uremic poisoning following a dental extraction in Washington, D.C., just a few hours before Chief Justice William Howard Taft, who had retired five weeks earlier. As it was customary for members of the Court to attend the funeral of deceased members, that posed a "logistical nightmare" because of the immediate travel from Knoxville for Sanford's funeral to Washington for Taft's funeral. As had been the case in their careers, Taft's death overshadowed Sanford's demise. Sanford is interred at Greenwood Cemetery in Knoxville.

== Legacy ==
In 1894, Sanford was chosen to deliver the centennial address at his alma mater, the University of Tennessee. The address, which discussed the institution's history, was published the following year as Blount College and the University of Tennessee: An Historical Address. Sanford's papers are located at various institutions in Tennessee. Sanford was an active member of Civitan International. And he may have been the inspiration for Ernest Lawrence Thayer's poetical tragic hero in Casey at the Bat. He is one of six Tennesseans who have served on the Supreme Court.

== See also ==
- Demographics of the Supreme Court of the United States
- List of justices of the Supreme Court of the United States
- List of law clerks for the eighth seat of the Supreme Court of the United States
- List of United States Supreme Court justices by time in office
- United States Supreme Court cases during the Taft Court

== Publications ==
- Sanford, Edward Terry. (18 June, 1895) Blount College and the University of Tennessee: An Historical Address at Google books.

== Notes ==
Legal offices
Preceded by William H. Lewis	United States Assistant Attorney General; 1907–1908	Succeeded by James Alexander Fowler
Preceded by Charles Dickens Clark	Judge of the United States District Court for the Eastern District of Tennessee; Judge of the United States District Court for the Middle District of Tennessee; 1908–1923	Succeeded by Xenophon Hicks
Preceded by Mahlon Pitney	Associate Justice of the Supreme Court of the United States; 1923–1930	Succeeded by Owen Roberts
