= 2013 term opinions of the Supreme Court of the United States =

October 2013 to October 2014 opinions

The 2013 term of the Supreme Court of the United States began October 7, 2013, and concluded October 5, 2014. The table illustrates which opinion was filed by each justice in each case and which justices joined each opinion.

== Table key ==
Delivered the court's opinion

Joined the court's opinion

Filed a concurrence

Joined a concurrence

Filed a dissent

Joined a dissent

Filed a concurrence/dissent

Joined a concurrence/dissent

Did not participate in the decision
- Decisions that do not note an argument date were decided without oral argument. Decisions that do not note a justice delivering the court's opinion are per curiam.
- Multiple concurrences and dissents within a case are numbered, with joining votes numbered accordingly. Justices frequently join multiple opinions in a single case; each vote is subdivided accordingly.
- An asterisk ( * ) in the court's opinion denotes that it was only a majority in part or a plurality. An asterisk in a joining vote denotes that the justice joined it only in part.
- A dash ( - ) denotes that the justice voted without filing or joining an opinion.

== 2013 term opinions ==
#	Case name and citation	Argued	Decided	Roberts	Scalia	Kennedy	Thomas	Ginsburg	Breyer	Alito	Sotomayor	Kagan
1	Madigan v. Levin, 571 U.S. 1	October 7, 2013	October 15, 2013									
2	Stanton v. Sims, 571 U.S. 3		November 4, 2013									
3	Burt v. Titlow, 571 U.S. 12	October 8, 2013	November 5, 2013					1			2	
4	Ford Motor Co. v. United States, 571 U.S. 28		December 2, 2013									
5	United States v. Woods, 571 U.S. 31	October 9, 2013	December 3, 2013									
6	Atlantic Marine Constr. Co. v. U.S. Dist. Ct. for Western Dist. of Tex., 571 U.S. 49	October 9, 2013	December 3, 2013									
7	Sprint Communications, Inc. v. Jacobs, 571 U.S. 69	November 5, 2013	December 10, 2013									
8	Unite Here Local 355 v. Mulhall, 571 U.S. 83	November 13, 2013	December 10, 2013									
9	Kansas v. Cheever, 571 U.S. 87	October 16, 2013	December 11, 2013									
10	Heimeshoff v. Hartford Life & Accident Ins. Co., 571 U.S. 99	October 15, 2013	December 16, 2013									
11	Daimler AG v. Bauman, 571 U.S. 117	October 15, 2013	January 14, 2014									
12	Mississippi ex rel. Hood v. AU Optronics Corp., 571 U.S. 161	November 6, 2013	January 14, 2014									
13	Ray Haluch Gravel Co. v. Central Pension Fund, 571 U.S. 177	December 9, 2013	January 15, 2014									
14	Medtronic, Inc. v. Mirowski Family Ventures, LLC, 571 U.S. 191	November 5, 2013	January 22, 2014									
15	Burrage v. United States, 571 U.S. 204	November 12, 2013	January 27, 2014							*		
16	Sandifer v. United States Steel Corp., 571 U.S. 220	November 4, 2013	January 27, 2014								*	
17	Air Wisconsin Airlines Corp. v. Hoeper, 571 U.S. 237	December 9, 2013	January 27, 2014		*		*					*
18	Hinton v. Alabama, 571 U.S. 263		February 24, 2014									
19	Walden v. Fiore, 571 U.S. 277	November 4, 2013	February 25, 2014									
20	Fernandez v. California, 571 U.S. 292	November 13, 2013	February 25, 2014		1		2					
21	Kaley v. United States, 571 U.S. 320	October 16, 2013	February 25, 2014									
22	United States v. Apel, 571 U.S. 359	December 4, 2013	February 26, 2014					1		2	1	
23	Chadbourne & Parke LLP v. Troice, 571 U.S. 377	October 7, 2013	February 26, 2014									
24	Law v. Siegel, 571 U.S. 415	January 13, 2014	March 4, 2014									
25	Lawson v. FMR LLC, 571 U.S. 429	November 12, 2013	March 4, 2014		*		*					
26	Lozano v. Montoya Alvarez, 572 U.S. 1	December 11, 2013	March 5, 2014									
27	BG Group plc v. Republic of Argentina, 572 U.S. 25	December 2, 2013	March 5, 2014								*	
28	Rosemond v. United States, 572 U.S. 65	November 12, 2013	March 5, 2014		*							
29	Marvin M. Brandt Revocable Trust v. United States, 572 U.S. 93	January 14, 2014	March 10, 2014									
30	Lexmark Int'l, Inc. v. Static Control Components, Inc., 572 U.S. 118	December 3, 2013	March 25, 2014									
31	United States v. Quality Stores, Inc., 572 U.S. 141	January 14, 2014	March 25, 2014									
32	United States v. Castleman, 572 U.S. 157	January 15, 2014	March 26, 2014		1		2			2		
33	McCutcheon v. Federal Election Comm'n, 572 U.S. 185	October 8, 2013	April 2, 2014	*								
34	Northwest, Inc. v. Ginsberg, 572 U.S. 273	December 3, 2013	April 2, 2014									
35	Schuette v. BAMN, 572 U.S. 291	October 15, 2013	April 22, 2014	1	2	*	2		3			
36	Prado Navarette v. California, 572 U.S. 393	January 21, 2014	April 22, 2014									
37	White v. Woodall, 572 U.S. 415	December 11, 2013	April 23, 2014									
38	Paroline v. United States, 572 U.S. 434	January 22, 2014	April 23, 2014	1	1		1				2	
39	EPA v. EME Homer City Generation, L. P., 572 U.S. 489	December 10, 2013	April 29, 2014									
40	Octane Fitness, LLC v. ICON Health & Fitness, Inc., 572 U.S. 545	February 26, 2014	April 29, 2014		*							
41	Highmark Inc. v. Allcare Health Management System, Inc., 572 U.S. 559	February 26, 2014	April 29, 2014									
42	Town of Greece v. Galloway, 572 U.S. 565	November 6, 2013	May 5, 2014		* / 1* / 2	*	* / 1	2	1 / 2	2	2	2
43	Robers v. United States, 572 U.S. 639	February 25, 2014	May 5, 2014									
44	Tolan v. Cotton, 572 U.S. 650		May 5, 2014									
45	Petrella v. Metro-Goldwyn-Mayer, Inc., 572 U.S. 663	January 21, 2014	May 19, 2014									
46	Hall v. Florida, 572 U.S. 701	March 3, 2014	May 27, 2014									
47	Wood v. Moss, 572 U.S. 744	March 26, 2014	May 27, 2014									
48	Plumhoff v. Rickard, 572 U.S. 765	March 4, 2014	May 27, 2014					*	*			
49	Michigan v. Bay Mills Indian Community, 572 U.S. 782	December 2, 2013	May 27, 2014		1 / 2		2	2 / 3		2		
50	Martinez v. Illinois, 572 U.S. 833		May 27, 2014									
51	Bond v. United States, 572 U.S. 844	November 5, 2013	June 2, 2014		1 / 2		1 / 2			1* / 2* / 3		
52	Nautilus, Inc. v. Biosig Instruments, Inc., 572 U.S. 898	April 28, 2014	June 2, 2014									
53	Limelight Networks, Inc. v. Akamai Technologies, Inc., 572 U.S. 915	April 30, 2014	June 2, 2014									
54	CTS Corp. v. Waldburger, 573 U.S. 1	April 23, 2014	June 9, 2014	*	*	*	*			*		
55	Executive Benefits Ins. Agency v. Arkison, 573 U.S. 25	January 14, 2014	June 9, 2014									
56	Scialabba v. Cuellar de Osorio, 573 U.S. 41	December 10, 2013	June 9, 2014				2*		2	1	2	*
57	POM Wonderful LLC v. Coca-Cola Co., 573 U.S. 102	April 21, 2014	June 12, 2014									
58	Clark v. Rameker, 573 U.S. 122	March 24, 2014	June 12, 2014									
59	Republic of Argentina v. NML Capital, Ltd., 573 U.S. 134	April 21, 2014	June 16, 2014									
60	Susan B. Anthony List v. Driehaus, 573 U.S. 149	April 22, 2014	June 16, 2014									
61	Abramski v. United States, 573 U.S. 169	January 22, 2014	June 16, 2014									
62	Alice Corp. v. CLS Bank Int'l, 573 U.S. 208	March 31, 2014	June 19, 2014									
63	Lane v. Franks, 573 U.S. 228	April 28, 2014	June 19, 2014									
64	United States v. Clarke, 573 U.S. 248	April 23, 2014	June 19, 2014									
65	Halliburton Co. v. Erica P. John Fund, Inc., 573 U.S. 258	March 5, 2014	June 23, 2014		1		1	2	2	1	2	
66	Utility Air Regulatory Group v. EPA, 573 U.S. 302	February 24, 2014	June 23, 2014		*		* / 2	* / 1	* / 1	* / 2	* / 1	* / 1
67	Loughrin v. United States, 573 U.S. 351	April 1, 2014	June 23, 2014		* / 1		* / 1			2		
68	Riley v. California, 573 U.S. 373	April 29, 2014	June 25, 2014									
69	Fifth Third Bancorp v. Dudenhoeffer, 573 U.S. 409	April 2, 2014	June 25, 2014									
70	American Broadcasting Cos. v. Aereo, Inc., 573 U.S. 431	April 22, 2014	June 25, 2014									
71	McCullen v. Coakley, 573 U.S. 464	January 15, 2014	June 26, 2014		1	1	1			2		
72	NLRB v. Noel Canning, 573 U.S. 513	January 13, 2014	June 26, 2014									
73	Harris v. Quinn, 573 U.S. 616	January 21, 2014	June 30, 2014									
74	Burwell v. Hobby Lobby Stores, Inc., 573 U.S. 682	March 25, 2014	June 30, 2014					1	1* / 2		1	1* / 2
75	Williams v. Johnson, 573 U.S. 773		July 1, 2014									
#	Case name and citation	Argued	Decided	Roberts	Scalia	Kennedy	Thomas	Ginsburg	Breyer	Alito	Sotomayor	Kagan

== 2013 term membership and statistics ==
This was the ninth term of Chief Justice Roberts's tenure and the fourth term with the same membership.

Justice		Appointment history		Agreement with judgment		Opinions filed				
Seniority	Name	President	Date confirmed	%	#					Total
Chief Justice	John Roberts	George W. Bush	September 29, 2005	92%	69/75	7	2	0	3	12
Associate Justice	Antonin Scalia	Ronald Reagan	September 26, 1986	89.3%	67/75	8	9	1	5	23
Associate Justice	Anthony Kennedy	Ronald Reagan	February 18, 1988	94.7%	71/75	8	1	0	1	10
Associate Justice	Clarence Thomas	George H. W. Bush	October 23, 1991	86.7%	65/75	7	7	0	1	15
Associate Justice	Ruth Bader Ginsburg	Bill Clinton	August 10, 1993	84%	63/75	7	4	0	5	16
Associate Justice	Stephen Breyer	Bill Clinton	August 3, 1994	85.1%	63/74	7	1	1	6	15
Associate Justice	Samuel Alito	George W. Bush	January 31, 2006	87.8%	65/74	8	9	2	2	21
Associate Justice	Sonia Sotomayor	Barack Obama	August 6, 2009	79.7%	59/74	8	6	0	5	19
Associate Justice	Elena Kagan	Barack Obama	August 7, 2010	87.7%	64/73	7	0	0	3	10
Notes on statistics: Opinion counts only include the bench opinions listed above; opinions relating to orders or in-chambers opinions are not included.; Agreement with the Court's judgment does not guarantee agreement with the reasoning expressed in its opinion. A justice is not considered in agreement if they dissented even in part. Agreement percentages are based only on the listed cases in which a justice participated and are rounded to the nearest one-tenth of one percentage point.; Individual opinion counts will not match the Court's totals; Breyer and Kagan's jointly authored dissent in Burwell v. Hobby Lobby Stores, Inc. is counted separately for both justices but counted only once in the Court's totals.						Totals				
						67	39	4	30	140
