= Ray Haluch Gravel Co. v. Central Pension Fund of the International Union of Operating Engineers and Participating Employers =

- Supreme Court of the United States

Decided January 15, 2014
- Full case name: Ray Haluch Gravel Co. v. Central Pension Fund of the International Union of Operating Engineers and Participating Employers
- Citations: 571 U.S. 177 (more)

Holding
- Any judgment on the merits is a final decision, even if there are outstanding questions about the accounting of a compensatory award or attorney's fees.

Court membership
- Chief Justice John Roberts Associate Justices Antonin Scalia · Anthony Kennedy; Clarence Thomas · Ruth Bader Ginsburg; Stephen Breyer · Samuel Alito; Sonia Sotomayor · Elena Kagan

Case opinion
- Majority: Kennedy, joined by unanimous

Ray Haluch Gravel Co. v. Central Pension Fund of the International Union of Operating Engineers and Participating Employers, 571 U.S. 177 (2014), was a United States Supreme Court case in which the court held that any judgment on the merits is a final decision, even if there are outstanding questions about the accounting of a compensatory award or attorney's fees.

== Background ==
Various union-affiliated benefit funds (Funds), sued Ray Haluch Gravel Co. (Haluch) in federal District Court to collect benefits contributions required to be paid under federal law. The Funds also sought attorneys' fees and costs, which were obligations under both a federal statute and the parties' collective bargaining agreement (CBA). The District Court issued an order on June 17, 2011, on the merits of the contribution claim and a separate ruling on July 25 on the Funds' motion for fees and costs. The Funds appealed both decisions on August 15.

Haluch argued that the June 17 order was a final decision pursuant to 28 U.S.C. §1291, and thus, the Funds' notice of appeal was untimely since it was not filed within the Federal Rules of Appellate Procedure's 30-day deadline. The Funds disagreed, arguing that there was no final decision until July 25. The First Circuit Court of Appeals acknowledged that an unresolved attorney's fees issue generally does not prevent judgment on the merits from being final, but held that no final decision was rendered until July 25 since the entitlement to fees and costs provided for in the CBA was an element of damages and thus part of the merits. Accordingly, the First Circuit addressed the appeal with respect to both the unpaid contributions and the fees and costs.

== Opinion of the court ==
The Supreme Court issued an opinion on January 15, 2014.
