= Dismissed as improvidently granted =

Order issued by U.S. Supreme Court

A grant of appellate review is dismissed as improvidently granted (DIG) when a court with discretionary appellate jurisdiction later decides that it should not review the case. The Supreme Court of the United States has occasionally granted a petition for a writ of certiorari, and later dismissed the case as improvidently granted.

== Supreme Court of the United States ==
Seal of the Supreme Court of the United States

The Supreme Court normally DIGs a case through a per curiam decision, (Note: One rare exception of a signed majority opinion is Rice v. Sioux City Memorial Park Cemetery, Inc., 349 U.S. 70 (1955). In a 5–3 decision written by Frankfurter, the court reconsidered a 4–4 affirmance of the Iowa Supreme Court, and instead DIGged the case. Harlan did not participate.) usually without giving reasons, but rather issuing a one-line decision: "The writ of certiorari is dismissed as improvidently granted." However, justices sometimes file separate opinions, and the opinion of the court may instead give reasons for the DIG.

A DIG can come as a surprise or disappointment to parties who have put significant effort into getting a case to the court, to third parties who have filed amicus briefs to express their views to the court, or to members of the public expecting resolution of a high-profile dispute. However, respondents who had urged the court not to take a case in the first place may seek to convince the court to DIG the case, leaving their lower-court victory intact and avoiding a potentially unfavorable precedent.

In most cases, the reasons for a DIG fall into three main categories:

1. The most common reason for a DIG is that the court discovers that the case is a "poor vehicle" for resolving the question presented. That is, there may be difficult threshold issues that the court would have to decide before getting to the issue that the court agreed to review.
2. The court also may DIG a case when it believes the petitioner has engaged in a "bait-and-switch", pressing new arguments or issues that were not the focus of the cert petition or the question upon which the court granted review.
3. The court sometimes DIGs cases where it is unable to agree on a clear resolution for the case, deciding to issue no decision rather than a fractured or muddled decision.

It has not always been clear how many votes are needed to DIG a case. By custom, it takes only four votes to grant certiorari, not a majority of five, so it has been suggested that six votes should be required to DIG a case (i.e., four justices could insist on keeping the case). Nevertheless, the Supreme Court has DIGged some cases over four justices' dissent, such as Medellin v. Dretke (2005), Robertson v. United States ex rel. Watson (2010), and Boyer v. Louisiana (2012).

Because per curiam opinions are issued from the court as an institution, these opinions lack the attribution of who authored or joined the decision. Sometimes, the Supreme Court DIGs a case through a simple docket order, rather than issuing even a per curiam opinion. (See Other cases below.) Accordingly, the lists below may not include every case with a DIG.

=== DIGs after oral argument since the 1989 term ===
Case name	Opinion	Granted	Argued	Decided	Notes
Laboratory Corp. of America Holdings v. Davis	No. 24-304, 605 U.S. ___	24 Jan 2025	29 Apr 2025	5 Jun 2025	One line. (Note: "The writ of certiorari is dismissed as improvidently granted.") Kavanaugh dissented.
NVIDIA Corp. v. E. Ohman J:or Fonder AB	No. 23-970, 604 U.S. ___	17 Jun 2024	13 Nov 2024	11 Dec 2024	One line.
Facebook, Inc. v. Amalgamated Bank	No. 23-980, 604 U.S. ___	10 Jun 2024	6 Nov 2024	22 Nov 2024	One line.
Moyle v. United States; Idaho v. United States	No. 23-726, 603 U.S. ___	5 Jan 2024	24 Apr 2024	27 Jun 2024	One line (which also included vacating the stays that the Supreme Court had previously granted). Kagan concurred, joined by Sotomayor and in part by Jackson. Barrett concurred, joined by Roberts and Kavanaugh. Jackson concurred in part and dissented in part. Alito dissented, joined by Thomas and in part by Gorsuch.
Coinbase, Inc. v. Suski	No. 22-105, 599 U.S. ___	8 Dec 2022	21 Mar 2023	23 Jun 2023	Footnote 7 in Coinbase, Inc. v. Bielski. (Note: "The Court's judgment today pertains to respondent Abraham Bielski. The writ of certiorari as to respondents David Suski et al. is dismissed as improvidently granted.")
In re Grand Jury	21-1397	3 Oct 2022 (Note: Question: Whether a communication involving both legal and non-legal advice is protected by attorney-client privilege where obtaining or providing legal advice was one of the significant purposes behind the communication.)	9 Jan 2023	23 Jan 2023	One line.
Arizona v. City and County of San Francisco	20-1775	29 Oct 2021 (Note: Question: Whether States with interests should be permitted to intervene to defend a rule when the United States ceases to defend.)	23 Feb 2022	15 Jun 2022	One line. Roberts concurred, joined by Thomas, Alito, and Gorsuch.
United States v. Texas	21-588	22 Oct 2021 (Note: Question: May the United States bring suit in federal court and obtain injunctive or declaratory relief against the State, state court judges, state court clerks, other state officials, or all private parties to prohibit S.B. 8 from being enforced.)	1 Nov 2021	10 Dec 2021	One line. Sotomayor dissented without an opinion. Argued and announced with Whole Woman's Health v. Jackson.
Henry Schein, Inc. v. Archer & White Sales, Inc. (2021)	19-963	15 Jun 2020 (Note: Question: Whether a provision in an arbitration agreement that exempts certain claims from arbitration negates an otherwise clear and unmistakable delegation of questions of arbitrability to an arbitrator.)	8 Dec 2020	25 Jan 2021	One line. This was the Supreme Court's second time hearing the case, following Henry Schein, Inc. v. Archer & White Sales, Inc. (2019).
Emulex Corp. v. Varjabedian	18-459	4 Jan 2019 (Note: Question: Whether the Ninth Circuit correctly held, in express disagreement with five other courts of appeals, that Section 14(e) of the Securities Exchange Act of 1934 supports an inferred private right of action based on a negligent misstatement or omission made in connection with a tender offer.)	15 Apr 2019	23 Apr 2019	One line.
City of Hays v. Vogt	16-1495	28 Sep 2017 (Note: Question: Whether the Fifth Amendment is violated when statements are used at a probable cause hearing but not at a criminal trial.)	20 Feb 2018	29 May 2018	One line. Gorsuch was recused.
Dalmazzi v. United States; Cox v. United States	16-961; 16-1017	28 Sep 2017 (Note: Question (directed by the Court): Whether this Court has jurisdiction to review [these two cases] under 28 U.S.C. §1259(3).)	16 Jan 2018	22 Jun 2018	One line. Argued and announced with Ortiz v. United States.
Duncan v. Owens	14-1516	1 Oct 2015 (Note: Question: Did the Seventh Circuit violate 28 U.S.C. § 2254 and a long line of this Court's decisions by awarding habeas relief in the absence of clearly established precedent from this Court?)	12 Jan 2016	20 Jan 2016	One line.
City and County of San Francisco v. Sheehan	No. 13-1412, 575 U.S. ___ (2015)	25 November 2014	23 March 2015	18 May 2015	
Unite Here Local 355 v. Mulhall	571 U.S. 83	24 Jun 2013 (Note: Question: Whether an employer and union may violate § 302 by entering into an agreement under which the employer exercises its freedom of speech by promising to remain neutral to union organizing, its property rights by granting union representatives limited access to the employer's property and employees, and its freedom of contract by obtaining the union's promise to forego its rights to picket, boycott, or otherwise put pressure on the employer's business?)	13 Nov 2013	10 Dec 2013	One line. Breyer dissented, joined by Sotomayor and Kagan.
Madigan v. Levin	571 U.S. 1	18 Mar 2013 (Note: Question: Whether the Seventh Circuit erred in holding, in an acknowledged departure from the rule in at least four other circuits, that state and local government employees may avoid the Federal Age Discrimination in Employment Act's comprehensive remedial regime by bringing age discrimination claims directly under the Equal Protection Clause and 42 U.S.C. § 1983.)	7 Oct 2013	15 Oct 2013	One line.
Boyer v. Louisiana	11-9953	5 Oct 2012 (Note: Question: Whether a state's failure to fund counsel for an indigent defendant for five years, particularly where failure was the direct result of the prosecution's choice to seek the death penalty, should be weighed against the state for speedy trial purposes?)	14 Jan 2013	29 Apr 2013	One line. Alito concurred, joined by Scalia and Thomas. Sotomayor dissented, joined by Ginsburg, Breyer, and Kagan.
First American Financial Corp. v. Edwards	10-708	20 Jun 2011 (Note: Question: [As to certain violations of the Real Estate Settlement Procedures Act of 1974, does a private purchaser of real estate settlement services] have standing to sue under Article III, § 2 of the United States Constitution, which provides that the federal judicial power is limited to "Cases" and "Controversies" and which this Court has interpreted to require the plaintiff to "have suffered an 'injury in fact,'" Lujan v. Defenders of Wildlife, 504 U.S. 555, 560 (1992)?)	28 Nov 2011	28 Jun 2012	One line.
Vasquez v. United States	11-199	28 Nov 2011 (Note: Questions: 1. 1. Did the Seventh Circuit violate this Court's precedent on harmless error when it focused its harmless error analysis solely on the weight of the untainted evidence without considering the potential effect of the error (the erroneous admission of trial counsel's statements that his client would lose the case and should plead guilty for their truth) on this jury at all?; 2. Did the Seventh Circuit violate Mr. Vasquez's Sixth Amendment right to a jury trial by determining that Mr. Vasquez should have been convicted without considering the effects of the district court's error on the jury that heard the case?)	21 Mar 2012	2 Apr 2012	One line.
Tolentino v. New York	563 U.S. 123	15 Nov 2010 (Note: Question: Whether pre-existing identity-related governmental documents, such as motor vehicle records, obtained as the direct result of police action violative of the Fourth Amendment, are subject to the exclusionary rule?)	21 Mar 2011	29 Mar 2011	One line.
Robertson v. United States ex rel. Watson	560 U.S. 272	14 Dec 2009 (Note: Question: Whether an action for criminal contempt in a congressionally created court may be brought in the name and pursuant to the power of a private person, rather than in the name and pursuant to the power of the United States.)	31 Mar 2010	24 May 2010	One line. Roberts dissented, joined by Scalia, Kennedy, and Sotomayor. Sotomayor dissented, joined by Kennedy.
Sullivan v. Florida	560 U.S. 181	4 May 2009 (Note: Questions: 1. Does imposition of a life-without-parole sentence on a thirteen-year-old for a non-homicide violate the prohibition on cruel and unusual punishments under the Eighth and Fourteenth Amendments, where the freakishly rare imposition of such a sentence reflects a national consensus on the reduced criminal culpability of children?; 2. Given the extreme rarity of a life imprisonment without parole sentence imposed on a 13-year-old child for a non-homicide and the unavailability of substantive review in any other federal court, should this Court grant review of a recently evolved Eighth Amendment claim where the state court has refused to do so?)	9 Nov 2009	17 May 2010	One line.
Philip Morris USA Inc. v. Williams (2009)	556 U.S. 178	9 Jun 2008 (Note: Question: Whether, after this Court has adjudicated the merits of a party’s federal claim and remanded the case to state court with instructions to "apply" the correct constitutional standard, the state court may interpose—for the first time in the litigation—a state-law procedural bar that is neither firmly established nor regularly followed.)	3 Dec 2008	31 Mar 2009	One line. This was the Supreme Court's second time hearing the case, following Philip Morris USA Inc. v. Williams (2007).
Bell v. Kelly	555 U.S. 55	12 May 2008 (Note: Question: Did the Fourth Circuit err when, in conflict with decisions of the Ninth and Tenth Circuits, it applied the deferential standard of 28 U.S.C. § 2254(d), which is reserved for claims "adjudicated on the merits" in state court, to evaluate a claim predicated on evidence of prejudice the state court refused to consider and that was properly received for the first time in a federal evidentiary hearing?)	12 Nov 2008	17 Nov 2008	One line.
Roper v. Weaver	550 U.S. 598	7 Dec 2006 (Note: Question: Since this court has neither held a prosecutor's penalty phase closing argument to violate due process, nor articulated, in response to a penalty phase claim, what the standard of error and prejudice would be, does a court of appeals exceed its authority under 28 U.S.C. §2254(d)(l) by overturning a capital sentence on the ground that the prosecutor's penalty phase closing argument was "unfairly inflammatory?")	21 Mar 2007	21 May 2007	The per curiam includes an explanation of its reasons. Roberts concurred in the result. Scalia dissented, joined by Thomas and Alito.
Toledo-Flores v. United States	549 U.S. 69	3 Apr 2006 (Note: Question: Has the Fifth Circuit erred in holding – in opposition to the Second, Third, Sixth, and Ninth Circuits – that a state felony conviction for simple possession of a controlled substance is a "drug trafficking crime" under 18 U.S.C. §924(c)(2) and hence an "aggravated felony", under 8 U.S.C. §1101(a)(43)(B), even though the same crime is a misdemeanor under federal law?)	3 Oct 2006	5 Dec 2006	One line. Argued and announced with Lopez v. Gonzales.
Laboratory Corp. of America Holdings v. Metabolite Laboratories, Inc.	548 U.S. 124	31 Oct 2005 (Note: Question: Whether a method patent setting forth an indefinite, undescribed, and non-enabling step directing a party simply to "correlat[e]" test results can validly claim a monopoly over a basic scientific relationship used in medical treatment such that any doctor necessarily infringes the patent merely by thinking about the. relationship after looking at a test result.)	21 Mar 2006	22 Jun 2006	One line. Roberts was recused.
Mohawk Industries, Inc. v. Williams	547 U.S. 516	12 Dec 2005 (Note: Question 1: Whether a defendant corporation and its agents can constitute an "enterprise" under the Racketeer Influenced and Corrupt Organizations Act, 18 U.S.C. §§ 1961-1968 ("RICO"), in light of the settled rule that a RICO defendant must "conduct" or "participate in" the affairs of some larger enterprise and not just its own affairs.; Question 2 (not granted): Whether plaintiffs state proximately caused injuries to business or property by alleging that the hourly wages they voluntarily accepted were too low.)	26 Apr 2006	5 Jun 2006	One paragraph. The Court initially granted review of only Question 1 of the cert petition. After hearing arguments, the Court dismissed as improvidently granted, but simultaneously issued a grant, vacate, remand of the entire cert petition in light of Anza v. Ideal Steel Supply Corp., which had been decided the same day.
Maryland v. Blake	546 U.S. 72	18 Apr 2005 (Note: Question: When a police officer improperly communicates with a suspect after invocation of the suspect's right to counsel, does Edwards v. Arizona permit consideration of curative measures by the police, or other intervening circumstances, to conclude that a suspect later initiated communication with the police?)	1 Nov 2005	14 Nov 2005	One line.
Medellín v. Dretke	544 U.S. 660	10 Dec 2004 (Note: Question 1: In a case brought by a Mexican national whose rights were adjudicated in the Avena Judgment, must a court in the United States apply as the rule of decision, notwithstanding any inconsistent United States precedent, the Avena holding that the United States courts must review and reconsider the national's conviction and sentence, without resort to procedural default doctrines?; Question 2: In a case brought by a foreign national of a State party to the Vienna Convention [on Consular Relations], should a court in the United States give effect to the LaGrand and Avena Judgments as a matter of international judicial comity and in the interest of uniform treaty interpretation?)	28 Mar 2005	23 May 2005	The per curiam includes an explanation of its reasons. Ginsburg concurred, join by Scalia as to Part II. O'Connor dissented, joined by Stevens, Souter, and Breyer. Breyer dissented, joined by Stevens. Souter dissented. The Court later decided a related case, Medellín v. Texas (2008).
Howell v. Mississippi	543 U.S. 440	28 Jun 2004 (Note: Question 1: Can a state court, consistent with the Eighth and Fourteenth Amendments to the Constitution of the United States, refuse to instruct a jury in a death penalty case on at least one lesser included offense that is recognized in state law and supported by the evidence?; Question 2 (directed by the Court): Was petitioner's federal constitutional claim properly raised before the Mississippi Supreme Court for purposes of 28 U.S.C. Sec. 1257?)	29 Nov 2004	24 Jan 2005	The per curiam includes an explanation of its reasons.
Nike, Inc. v. Kasky	539 U.S. 654	10 Jan 2003	23 Apr 2003	26 Jun 2003	One line. Stevens concurred, joined by Ginsburg, and joined by Souter as to Part III. Kennedy dissented without an opinion. Breyer dissented, joined by O'Connor.
Abdur'Rahman v. Bell	537 U.S. 88	22 Apr 2002	6 Nov 2002	10 Dec 2002	One line. Stevens dissented.
Ford Motor Co. v. McCauley	537 U.S. 1	19 Feb 2002	7 Oct 2002	15 Oct 2002	One line.
Mathias v. WorldCom Technologies, Inc.	535 U.S. 682	5 Mar 2001 (Note: Question 1: Whether a state commission's action relating to the enforcement of a previously approved section 252 interconnection agreement is a "determination under section 252" and thus is reviewable in federal court under 47 U.S.C. Sec. 252(e)(6).; Question 2: Whether a state commission's acceptance of Congress's invitation to participate in implementing a federal regulatory scheme that provides that state commission determinations are reviewable in federal court; constitutes a waiver of Eleventh Amendment immunity.: Question 3: Whether an official capacity action seeking prospective relief against state public utility commissioners for alleged ongoing violations of federal law in performing federal regulatory functions under the federal Telecommunications Act of 1996 can be maintained under the Ex parte Young doctrine.)	5 Dec 2001	20 May 2002	The per curiam includes an explanation of its reasons. O'Connor was recused.
Adams v. Florida Power Corp.	535 U.S. 1	3 Dec 2001	20 Mar 2002	1 Apr 2002	One line.
Adarand Constructors, Inc. v. Mineta	534 U.S. 103	26 Mar 2001	31 Oct 2001	27 Nov 2001	The per curiam includes an explanation of its reasons. This was the Supreme Court's third time hearing the case, following Adarand Constructors, Inc. v. Peña (1995) and Adarand Constructors, Inc. v. Slater (2000).
Board of Trustees of the University of Alabama v. Garrett	531 U.S. 356		11 Oct 2000	21 Feb 2001	
District of Columbia v. Tri County Industries, Inc.	531 U.S. 287		10 Jan 2001	17 Jan 2001	One line.
Ricci v. Arlington Heights	523 U.S. 613		21 Apr 1998	4 May 1998	One line.
Rogers v. United States	522 U.S. 252		5 Nov 1997	14 Jan 1998	Stevens wrote the plurality opinion, joined by Thomas, Ginsburg, and Breyer. O'Connor concurred in the result, joined by Scalia. Kennedy dissented, joined by Rehnquist and Souter.
Adams v. Robertson	520 U.S. 83		14 Jan 1997	3 Mar 1997	The per curiam includes an explanation of its reasons.
Grimmett v. Brown	519 U.S. 233		6 Jan 1997	14 Jan 1997	One line.
Ticor Title Insurance Company v. Brown	511 U.S. 117		1 Mar 1994	4 Apr 1994	The per curiam includes an explanation of its reasons. O'Connor dissented, joined by Rehnquist and Kennedy.
Tennessee v. Middlebrooks	510 U.S. 124		1 Nov 1993	13 Dec 1993	One line. Blackmun dissented without an opinion.
Cavanaugh v. Roller	510 U.S. 42		8 Nov 1993	30 Nov 1993	One line.
Izumi Seimitsu Kogyo Kabushiki Kaisha v. U. S. Philips Corp.	510 U.S. 27		12 Oct 1993	30 Nov 1993	The per curiam includes an explanation of its reasons. Stevens dissented, joined by Blackmun.
Hadley v. United States	506 U.S. 19		4 Nov 1992	16 Nov 1992	One line.
Montana v. Imlay	506 U.S. 5		7 Oct 1992	3 Nov 1992	One line. Stevens concurred. White dissented.
PFZ Properties, Inc. v. Rodriguez	503 U.S. 257		26 Feb 1992	9 Mar 1992	One line.
Gibson v. Florida Bar	502 U.S. 104		6 Nov 1991	4 Dec 1991	One line.
Ohio v. Huertas	498 U.S. 336		16 Jan 1991	22 Jan 1991	One line.
Parker v. Duggar	498 U.S. 308		7 Nov 1990	22 Jan 1991	
White v. United States	493 U.S. 5		3 Oct 1989	16 Oct 1989	One line. White dissented without an opinion.

=== Other cases dismissed as improvidently granted since 2001 ===
The following cases were dismissed as improvidently granted by the court through a docket order rather than a published opinion. The Supreme Court's online docket search system "contains complete information regarding the status of cases filed since the beginning of the 2001 Term". Orders from before 2001 may appear instead in the United States Reports.

Case name	Order	Granted	Argued	Decided	Notes
Ardoin v. Robinson	21-1596	28 Jun 2022	N/A	26 Jun 2023	One paragraph/docket order (Note: "The writ of certiorari before judgment is dismissed as improvidently granted. The stay heretofore entered by the Court on June 28, 2022, is vacated. This will allow the matter to proceed before the Court of Appeals for the Fifth Circuit for review in the ordinary course and in advance of the 2024 congressional elections in Louisiana. See this Court's Rule 11.")
PEM Entities LLC v. Levin	16-492	27 Jun 2017	N/A	10 Aug 2017	One line/docket order.
Visa Inc. v. Osborn; Visa Inc. v. Stoumbos	580 U.S. 993	28 Jun 2016	N/A	17 Nov 2016	Docket order with explanation.
Public Employees' Retirement System of Mississippi v. IndyMac MBS, Inc.	573 U.S. 988	10 Mar 2014	N/A	29 Sep 2014	One line/docket order.
Cline v. Oklahoma Coalition for Reproductive Justice	571 U.S. 985	27 Jun 2013	N/A	4 Nov 2013	One line/docket order. Before the DIG, the Court certified a question of Oklahoma law to the Supreme Court of Oklahoma, and received its response.
McCarver v. North Carolina	533 U.S. 975	26 Mar 2001	N/A	25 Sep 2001	One line/docket order.

== See also ==
- Procedures of the Supreme Court of the United States
