= Air Wisconsin Airlines Corp. v. Hoeper =

- Supreme Court of the United States

Decided January 27, 2014
- Full case name: Air Wisconsin Airlines Corp. v. Hoeper
- Citations: 571 U.S. 237 (more)

Holding
- Under ATSA, airlines and their employees are immune from civil liability for reporting suspicious behavior so long as the reporting statements are "materially true."

Court membership
- Chief Justice John Roberts Associate Justices Antonin Scalia · Anthony Kennedy; Clarence Thomas · Ruth Bader Ginsburg; Stephen Breyer · Samuel Alito; Sonia Sotomayor · Elena Kagan

Case opinions
- Majority: Sotomayor
- Concur/dissent: Scalia, joined by Thomas, Kagan

Laws applied
- Aviation and Transportation Security Act

Air Wisconsin Airlines Corp. v. Hoeper, 571 U.S. 237 (2014), was a United States Supreme Court case in which the court held that, under the Aviation and Transportation Security Act, airlines and their employees are immune from civil liability for reporting suspicious behavior so long as the reporting statements are "materially true."

== Background ==
William L. Hoeper was a pilot for Air Wisconsin Airlines. When Air Wisconsin stopped flying from Hoeper's home base on aircraft that he was certified to fly, he needed to become certified on a different type of aircraft to keep his job. After Hoeper failed in his first three attempts to gain certification, Air Wisconsin agreed to give him a fourth and final chance, but he performed poorly during a required training session in a simulator. Hoeper responded angrily to this failure—raising his voice, tossing his headset, using profanity, and accusing the instructor of "railroading the situation."

The instructor called an Air Wisconsin manager, who booked Hoeper on a flight from the test location to Hoeper's home in Denver. Several hours later, the manager discussed Hoeper's behavior with other airline officials. The officials discussed Hoeper's outburst, his impending termination, the history of assaults by disgruntled airline employees, and the chance that—because Hoeper was a Federal Flight Deck Officer (FFDO) permitted "to carry a firearm while engaged in providing air transportation"—he might be armed. At the end of the meeting, an airline executive made the decision to notify the Transportation Security Administration (TSA) of the situation. The manager who had received the initial report from Hoeper's instructor made the call to the TSA. During that call, according to the jury, he made two statements: first, that Hoeper "was an FFDO who may be armed" and that the airline was "concerned about his mental stability and the whereabouts of his firearm"; and second, that an "[u]nstable pilot in [the] FFDO program was terminated today." In response, the TSA removed Hoeper from his plane, searched him, and questioned him about the location of his gun. Hoeper eventually boarded a later flight to Denver, and Air Wisconsin fired him the next day.

Hoeper sued for defamation in Colorado district court. Air Wisconsin moved for summary judgment and later for a directed verdict, relying on the Aviation and Transportation Security Act (ATSA), which grants airlines and their employees immunity against civil liability for reporting suspicious behavior except where such disclosure is "made with actual knowledge that the disclosure was false, inaccurate, or misleading" or "made with reckless disregard as to the truth or falsity of that disclosure." The trial court denied the motions and submitted the ATSA immunity question to the jury. The jury found for Hoeper on the defamation claim. The Colorado Supreme Court affirmed. It held that the trial court erred in submitting the immunity question to the jury but that the error was harmless. Laboring under the assumption that even true statements do not qualify for ATSA immunity if they are made recklessly, the court held that Air Wisconsin was not entitled to immunity because its statements to the TSA were made with reckless disregard of their truth or falsity.

== Opinion of the court ==
The Supreme Court issued an opinion on January 27, 2014. The Court reversed the decision of the Colorado Supreme Court. The reasoning was, in part, "because any falsehood in the disclosure . . . would not have affected a reasonable security officer’s assessment of the supposed threat."

=== Concurrence/Dissent ===
Justice Scalia (joined by Justice Thomas and Justice Kagan) partially dissented from the majority opinion. In his view, the majority should have remanded the case "to decide a factbound question better left to the lower courts."
