= Sandifer v. U.S. Steel Corp. =

- Supreme Court of the United States

Decided January 27, 2014
- Full case name: Sandifer v. U.S. Steel Corp.
- Citations: 571 U.S. 220 (more)

Holding
- Time spent donning and doffing protective gear is time spent "changing clothes," so the Fair Labor Standards Act of 1938 allows unions and employers to agree that workers will not be paid for that time.

Court membership
- Chief Justice John Roberts Associate Justices Antonin Scalia · Anthony Kennedy; Clarence Thomas · Ruth Bader Ginsburg; Stephen Breyer · Samuel Alito; Sonia Sotomayor · Elena Kagan

Case opinion
- Majority: Scalia, joined by Roberts, Kennedy, Thomas, Ginsburg, Breyer, Alito, Kagan; Sotomayor (except footnote 7)

Laws applied
- Fair Labor Standards Act of 1938

Sandifer v. U.S. Steel Corp., 571 U.S. 220 (2014), was a United States Supreme Court case in which the court held that time spent donning and doffing protective gear is time spent "changing clothes," so the Fair Labor Standards Act of 1938 allows unions and employers to agree that workers will not be paid for that time.

== Background ==
Sandifer and other workers filed a putative class action under the Fair Labor Standards Act of 1938, seeking backpay for time spent donning and doffing pieces of protective gear that they asserted United States Steel Corporation requires workers to wear because of hazards at its steel plants. U.S. Steel contended that this donning-and-doffing time, which would otherwise be compensable under the Act, was noncompensable under a provision of its collective-bargaining agreement with the workers' union. That provision's validity depended on 29 U. S. C. §203(o), which allows parties to collectively bargain over whether "time spent in changing clothes... at the beginning or end of each workday" must be compensated. The federal District Court granted U.S. Steel summary judgment on this issue, holding that the workers' donning and doffing constituted "changing clothes" under §203(o). It also assumed that any time spent donning and doffing items that were not "clothes" was "de minimis" and hence noncompensable. The Seventh Circuit Court of Appeals affirmed.

== Opinion of the court ==
The Supreme Court issued an opinion on January 27, 2014. The court declined to use definitions of "clothes" offered by the parties and, in an opinion by Antonin Scalia, read dictionaries to determine the ordinary meaning of the word. Having done that, the court concluded that the protective gear that the workers wore were "clothes" and that the Fair Labor Standards Act allowed collective bargaining agreements to stipulate that changing these clothing items was not compensated.
