= Wood v. Moss =

- Supreme Court of the United States

Argued March 26, 2014 Decided May 27, 2014
- Full case name: Tim Wood and Rob Savage, Petitioners v. Michael Moss, et al.
- Docket no.: 13-115
- Citations: 572 U.S. 744 (more) 134 S. Ct. 2056; 188 L. Ed. 2d 1039
- Argument: Oral argument
- Opinion announcement: Opinion announcement

Case history
- Prior: Moss v. U.S. Secret Serv., 572 F.3d 962 (9th Cir. 2009); on remand, 750 F. Supp. 2d 1197 (D. Or. 2010); affirmed in part, 675 F.3d 1213 (9th Cir. 2012); rehearing en banc denied, 711 F.3d 941 (9th Cir. 2012); cert. granted, 571 U.S. 1067 (2013).

Holding
- Secret Service agents are entitled to qualified immunity from First Amendment claims after they removed protesters who had crossed their security perimeter from demonstrating against the President.

Court membership
- Chief Justice John Roberts Associate Justices Antonin Scalia · Anthony Kennedy; Clarence Thomas · Ruth Bader Ginsburg; Stephen Breyer · Samuel Alito; Sonia Sotomayor · Elena Kagan

Case opinion
- Majority: Ginsburg, joined by unanimous

Laws applied
- U.S. Const. amend. I

Wood v. Moss, 572 U.S. 744 (2014), was a United States Supreme Court case holding secret service officers who moved protesters away from the president were protected by qualified immunity. Justice Ruth Bader Ginsburg wrote the opinion for a unanimous court. The case arose out of a campaign stop President George W. Bush made during the 2004 presidential campaign. Prior to the campaign event, Bush dined at a restaurant near where a group of supporters and a group of protesters had gathered. Two secret service agents directed local police to move the protesters to protect the president. The protesters sued the agents in the U.S. District Court of the District of Oregon. The agents filed a motion to dismiss which was eventually granted based upon the Supreme Court's decision.

== Background ==
=== Factual background ===
President George W. Bush went to Jacksonville, Oregon for a campaign event for the 2004 presidential election. Two groups assembled, with permission, on opposite sides of a street near the venue: a group of supporters and a group of protesters. President Bush decided to make an unplanned stop for food at the Jacksonville Inn prior to the event, causing the protesters to move closer to the restaurant. Two secret service officers, with the help of local police, made the decision to move the protesters to another block, causing the protesters to then be further away from restaurant than the supporters. After the President's meal, the President's motorcade left the restaurant and its route left protesters too far away to be seen or heard.

=== Procedural history ===
The protesters filed suit against the two secret service agents in U. S. District Court for the District of Oregon. The protesters claimed the actions of the officers had violated the protesters' First Amendment rights, specifically engaging in view point discrimination by moving the protesters further away than the supporters. The agents moved to dismiss for failure to state a claim and further arguing they were protected by qualified immunity. The District Court denied the motion. The U. S. Court of Appeals for the Ninth Circuit then reversed on interlocutory appeal, but instructed the lower court to allow protesters the opportunity to amend their complaint. The protesters supplemented their complaint with allegations the secret service systematically attempted to remove protesters from the vicinity of event sites and motorcade routes. Ibid. The agents again moved to dismiss and the District Court denied the motion. On a second interlocutory appeal the Ninth Circuit affirmed. The Supreme Court granted certiorari.

== Opinion of the Court ==
In a unanimous opinion, authored by Ruth Bader Ginsburg, the Court held the two secret service agents were entitled to qualified immunity. To circumvent the doctrine of qualified immunity, the protesters would need to show the violation of a constitutional right and that the right was "clearly established" at the time of the conduct. Only one prior Supreme Court case had addressed the qualified immunity of secret service agents. Hunter v. Bryant, 502 U.S. 224 (1991) applied qualified immunity to secret service agents who had arrested an individual for a threat to assassinate the president. In other cases, the Court has recognized the importance of protecting the chief executive. Ibid.

Although the Ninth Circuit had found fault with the secret service agents for failing to provide a reason for treating the supporters and protesters differently, the Supreme Court found that no existing law would have alerted the secret service agents that they had an obligation under the First Amendment to give each group comparable locations at all times. The Court was persuaded there was a security motive for moving the protesters, who had been in weapons range with an unobstructed view of the President dining on the patio and there would have been no such rationale for moving the supporters. Ibid. No existing law required the secret service to interfere with the speech rights of supporters more than security concerns necessitated.

The Court also rejected the protesters' allegation that the secret service agents moved the protesters to engage in viewpoint discrimination. After noting that a White House manual urging political operatives to work with secret service designate a protest area outside of the view of presidential motorcades was not actually the policy of the secret service itself, the Court noted the actual agents themselves would need to have acted with discriminatory intent. The Court found it persuasive that a security motive existed for moving the protesters.

== Subsequent legal action ==
The Supreme Court's decision dismissed the claims against the two secret service agents, however, other claims against the Jacksonville Chief of Police, the city of Jacksonville and former Sheriff remained active. Protesters who were detained were certified as a class whereas individual claims of excessive force, including a claim from Michael Moss, the named respondent in Wood v. Moss, proceeded individually.

== Responses and analysis ==
This case was one of several to allege the Bush administration used the secret service to keep protesters away from Bush's public appearances.

The New Republic found the decision to be a hopeful one for future protections for free speech. Although the protesters lost, The New Republic noted that the Court indicated that acting purely based on viewpoint discrimination might have yielded a different result. The New Republic also found Ginsburg's treatment of the field manual as disapproving.

The American Civil Liberties Union released a statement expressing its disappointment with the decision to dismiss the case. The organization believed a jury should have been able to decide whether the secret service was censuring speech.
