= Financial Security Law of France =

The Financial Security Law of France (known in France as LSF or Loi de sécurité financière), signed by the Minister of Finance, Francis Mer, was adopted by the French Parliament on July 17, 2003, in order to strengthen the legal provisions relating to corporate governance. The LSF was published in OJ No. 177, August 2, 2003 (No. 2003-706 dated August 1, 2003). Provisions of this law are applicable to all public limited companies as well as to companies calling on public savings for financial years beginning on or after January 1, 2003.

Similar to the American Sarbanes–Oxley Act, the Financial Security Law of France rests mainly on:

- An increased responsibility of leaders
- A strengthening of internal control
- A reduction in the sources of conflicts of interest v

== See also ==
- Presentation on the Financial Security Law of France or LSF (loi de sécurité financière):
