= Lawson v. FMR, LLC =

- Supreme Court of the United States

Decided March 4, 2014
- Full case name: Lawson v. FMR, LLC
- Citations: 571 U.S. 429 (more)

Holding
- The Sarbanes–Oxley Act grants whistleblower protection to employees of public companies and also to employees of a public company's private contractors and subcontractors.

Court membership
- Chief Justice John Roberts Associate Justices Antonin Scalia · Anthony Kennedy; Clarence Thomas · Ruth Bader Ginsburg; Stephen Breyer · Samuel Alito; Sonia Sotomayor · Elena Kagan

Case opinions
- Majority: Ginsburg
- Concurrence: Scalia (in judgment), joined by Thomas
- Dissent: Sotomayor, joined by Kennedy, Alito

Laws applied
- Sarbanes–Oxley Act

Lawson v. FMR, LLC, 571 U.S. 429 (2014), was a United States Supreme Court case in which the court held that the Sarbanes–Oxley Act grants whistleblower protection to employees of public companies and also to employees of a public company's private contractors and subcontractors.

== Background ==
To safeguard investors in public companies and restore trust in the financial markets following the collapse of Enron Corporation, Congress passed the Sarbanes–Oxley Act of 2002. One of the act's provisions protects whistleblowers; at the time of this case, that provision in 18 U. S. C. §1514A(a) instructed: "No [public] company..., or any... contractor [or] subcontractor... of such company, may discharge, demote, suspend, threaten, harass, or... discriminate against an employee in the terms and conditions of employment because of [whistleblowing activity]."

A group of workers, including Lawson, sued their former employers (collectively FMR), private companies that contract to advise or manage mutual funds. As is common in the industry, the mutual funds served by FMR are public companies with no employees. The workers alleged that they blew the whistle on putative fraud relating to the mutual funds and, as a consequence, suffered retaliation by FMR. Each commenced suit in federal district court. Moving to dismiss the suits, FMR argued that the plaintiffs could state no claim under §1514A, becausethat provision protects only employees of public companies and not employees of private companies that contract with public companies. On interlocutory appeal from the District Court's denial of FMR's motion to dismiss, the First Circuit Court of Appeals reversed. The First Circuit said that the term "an employee" in §1514A(a) referred only to employees of public companies.

== Opinion of the court ==
The Supreme Court issued an opinion on March 4, 2014.

In dissent, Sotomayor complained about the potential scope of the decision. She predicted that:

As interpreted today, the Sarbanes–Oxley Act authorizes a babysitter to bring a federal case against his employer—a parent who happens to work at the local Walmart (a public company)—if the parent stops employing the babysitter after he expresses concern that the parent’s teenage son may have participated in an Internet purchase fraud. And it opens the door to a cause of action against a small business that contracts to clean the local Starbucks (a public company) if an employee is demoted after reporting that another nonpublic company client has mailed the cleaning company a fraudulent invoice.
