= Medtronic, Inc. v. Mirowski Family Ventures, LLC =

- Supreme Court of the United States

Argued November 5, 2013 Decided January 22, 2014
- Full case name: Medtronic, Inc. v. Mirowski Family Ventures, LLC
- Docket no.: 12-1128
- Citations: 571 U.S. 191 (more) 134 S. Ct. 843; 187 L. Ed. 2d 703; 2014 U.S. LEXIS 788; 82 U.S.L.W. 4067; 109 U.S.P.Q.2d 1341
- Argument: Oral argument
- Opinion announcement: Opinion announcement

Case history
- Prior: Medtronic, Inc. v. Boston Scientific Corp., 777 F. Supp. 2d 750 (D. Del. 2011); vacated and remanded, 695 F.3d 1266 (Fed. Cir. 2012); cert. granted, 569 U.S. 993 (2013).
- Subsequent: On remand, Medtronic Inc. v. Boston Scientific Corp., 558 F. App'x 998 (Fed. Cir. 2014); cert. denied, 135 S. Ct. 364 (2014).

Holding
- When a licensee seeks a declaratory judgment against a patentee that its products do not infringe the licensed patent, the patentee bears the burden of persuasion on the issue of infringement.

Court membership
- Chief Justice John Roberts Associate Justices Antonin Scalia · Anthony Kennedy; Clarence Thomas · Ruth Bader Ginsburg; Stephen Breyer · Samuel Alito; Sonia Sotomayor · Elena Kagan

Case opinion
- Majority: Breyer, joined by unanimous

Laws applied
- 28 U.S.C. § 1338 (district court jurisdiction over patents), 28 U.S.C. § 2201 (power to issue declaratory judgment)

Medtronic, Inc. v. Mirowski Family Ventures, LLC, 571 U.S. 191 (2014), was a unanimous decision of the Supreme Court of the United States concerning the allocation of the burden of proof in a patent-related declaratory judgment action. The Court held that when a patent licensee seeks a declaration that its products do not infringe the licensed patent, the patentee retains the burden of proving infringement.

== Background ==
Medtronic designs, manufactures, and sells medical devices, while Mirowski Family Ventures owns patents relating to implantable heart stimulators. In 1991, Mirowski entered into a licensing agreement with Eli Lilly and Company, which sublicensed certain Mirowski patents to Medtronic in exchange for royalty payments. Under the agreement, if Mirowski notified Medtronic that a new product infringed a licensed patent, Medtronic could either pay the applicable royalties or challenge the allegation through a declaratory judgment action.

In 2006, the parties modified the procedure for resolving disputes. Medtronic could challenge an infringement allegation while placing the disputed royalties in an escrow account, with the prevailing party receiving the funds. In 2007, Mirowski notified Medtronic that seven of its products allegedly infringed claims in U.S. Reissue Patent Nos. RE38,119 and RE39,897, which concerned cardiac resynchronization therapy devices. Medtronic denied that its products infringed the patents and also disputed their validity.

Medtronic filed an action in the United States District Court for the District of Delaware, seeking declarations that its products did not infringe the patents and that the patents were invalid. In accordance with the parties' agreement, Medtronic continued placing the disputed royalties in escrow while the litigation proceeded.

== Lower-court proceedings ==
The District Court held that Mirowski, although the defendant, bore the burden of proving infringement because it was the party asserting infringement. After a bench trial, the court concluded that Mirowski had not established either direct infringement or infringement under the doctrine of equivalents and entered judgment of noninfringement in Medtronic's favor.

On appeal, the Federal Circuit acknowledged the general rule that a patentee bears the burden of proving infringement. It nevertheless held that a different rule applied because the continuing license prevented Mirowski from asserting an infringement counterclaim. The court placed the burden of persuasion on Medtronic, as the party seeking a declaration of noninfringement, and remanded the infringement issue for reconsideration under that allocation of the burden.

Medtronic petitioned for certiorari. Citing the importance of burdens of proof in patent litigation, the Supreme Court granted review.

== Supreme Court decision ==
The Supreme Court unanimously reversed the Federal Circuit in an opinion written by Justice Stephen Breyer. Before addressing the burden of proof, the Court rejected an argument that the Federal Circuit lacked subject-matter jurisdiction. It reasoned that, without the declaratory-judgment action, Mirowski could have terminated the license and brought a patent-infringement suit if Medtronic stopped paying royalties. Because that threatened action would arise under federal patent law, Medtronic's declaratory-judgment action did as well.

On the merits, the Court held that the patentee retained the burden of proving infringement. It relied on three established principles: a patentee ordinarily bears the burden of proving infringement; the Declaratory Judgment Act is procedural and does not change the parties' substantive rights; and the burden of proof is a substantive component of a legal claim.

The Court also identified practical reasons for keeping the burden with the patentee. Shifting it according to which party filed the action could produce inconsistent judgments when the evidence was inconclusive. It could also require a licensee to disprove every possible theory of infringement, even though the patent holder was better positioned to identify how the accused products allegedly infringed the patent.

The Court further concluded that the Federal Circuit's rule conflicted with the purpose of the Declaratory Judgment Act. Requiring the licensee to prove noninfringement would make a declaratory-judgment action less useful and could recreate the choice between abandoning a challenge to the patent's scope and stopping royalty payments while risking an infringement suit. The Court rejected Mirowski's remaining arguments and reversed and remanded the Federal Circuit's judgment.

== Significance ==
The decision clarified an issue left unresolved by MedImmune, Inc. v. Genentech, Inc.. In MedImmune, the Supreme Court held that a patent licensee could seek declaratory relief while continuing to pay royalties rather than first breaching or terminating the license. Because that dispute settled after remand, the Court did not determine which party would bear the burden of proving infringement in such an action. Medtronic resolved that question by holding that the burden remained with the patentee.

Legal commentary characterized the ruling as another rejection of a patent-specific procedural rule developed by the Federal Circuit. The decision reinforced the principle that patent declaratory-judgment actions generally follow ordinary civil-procedure rules and preserved the ability of such actions to provide a definitive determination of the parties' rights.
