= United States v. Woods =

- Supreme Court of the United States

Argued October 9, 2013 Decided December 3, 2013
- Full case name: United States, Petitioner v. Gary Woods
- Docket no.: 12-562
- Citations: 571 U.S. 31 (more) 134 S. Ct. 557; 187 L. Ed. 2d 472; 2013 U.S. LEXIS 8776; 82 U.S.L.W. 4015
- Argument: Oral argument
- Opinion announcement: Opinion announcement

Case history
- Prior: Petitioners request granted, US Dis. Ct.; District Court affirmed by 5th Cir. Ct.

Holding
- The district court had jurisdiction to determine whether the partnerships' lack of economic substance could justify imposing a valuation-misstatement penalty on the partners.

Court membership
- Chief Justice John Roberts Associate Justices Antonin Scalia · Anthony Kennedy; Clarence Thomas · Ruth Bader Ginsburg; Stephen Breyer · Samuel Alito; Sonia Sotomayor · Elena Kagan

Case opinion
- Majority: Scalia, joined by unanimous

Laws applied
- Tax Equity and Fiscal Responsibility Act of 1982

United States v. Woods, 571 U.S. 31 (2013), was a United States Supreme Court case in which the Court addressed whether district courts have jurisdiction regarding provisions of the Internal Revenue Service Code and its implementation. The court held unanimously that a district court has jurisdiction in the application of the Internal Revenues Service Code to a partnership-level proceeding when it is applied to that partnership. The court additionally found that a transaction determined to lack economic substance can still trigger the penalty for overstatement because the overstatement and the action that led to it are inherently tied together.
