= Law v. Siegel =

- Supreme Court of the United States

Argued January 13, 2014 Decided March 4, 2014
- Full case name: Stephen Law, Petitioner v. Alfred H. Siegel, Chapter 7 Trustee
- Docket no.: 12-5196
- Citations: 571 U.S. 415 (more) 134 S. Ct. 1188; 188 L. Ed. 2d 146
- Argument: Oral argument

Case history
- Prior: Law v. Siegel (In re Law), 435 Fed. App'x 697 (9th Cir. 2011)., affirming In re Law, 2009 WL 7751415 (9th Cir. B.A.P. 2009)., affirming In re Law, 401 B.R. 447 (Bkrtcy. Ct. CD Cal. 2009)., cert. granted, 570 U.S. 904 (2013).

Holding
- Whatever other sanctions a bankruptcy court may impose on a dishonest debtor, it may not contravene express provisions of the Bankruptcy Code by ordering that the debtor’s exempt property be used to pay debts and expenses for which that property is not liable under the Code.

Court membership
- Chief Justice John Roberts Associate Justices Antonin Scalia · Anthony Kennedy; Clarence Thomas · Ruth Bader Ginsburg; Stephen Breyer · Samuel Alito; Sonia Sotomayor · Elena Kagan

Case opinion
- Majority: Scalia, joined by unanimous

Laws applied
- 11 U.S.C. § 105 (power of the bankruptcy court), 11 U.S.C. § 522 (exemptions from bankrupt estate)

Law v. Siegel, 571 U.S. 415 (2014), is a ruling of the Supreme Court of the United States that describes the extent of the powers of bankruptcy courts in dealing with the bad faith of debtors.

== Background ==
When Law filed for Chapter 7 bankruptcy in 2004, his sole asset was a home in Hacienda Heights, California that was said to be worth $363,000. He declared that:

- there was a first mortgage lien (deed of trust) of $150,000 owing to a bank, and a second for $168,000 owing to "Lin’s Mortgage & Associates"
- there were three judgment liens also registered against the property
- as the value of the two mortgage liens, together with California's homestead exemption of $75,000, was greater than the value of the house, there was nothing available for distribution to Law's general creditors.

It was discovered in subsequent litigation (Note: Law appealed orders of the Bankruptcy Court over a dozen times to the Bankruptcy Appeal Panel and seven times to the Court of Appeals.) that the second mortgage lien did not exist. The house sold for about $680,000, and only one creditor timely filed a proof of claim which was settled for $120,000. The trustee sought to surcharge the homestead exemption in order to be reimbursed for his legal expenses in the matter.

== The courts below ==
The United States Bankruptcy Court for the Central District of California, in accordance with existing jurisprudence within the Ninth Circuit, (Note: Latman v. Burdette, 366 F. 3d 774 (9th Cir. 2004). and In Re Onubah, 375 B.R. 549 (9th Cir. BAP 2007).) ordered that Law's homestead must be surcharged in its entirety. This was affirmed by the Bankruptcy Appeals Panel, and subsequently by the United States Court of Appeals for the Ninth Circuit.

== At the Supreme Court ==
The Ninth Circuit ruling was reversed. In a unanimous ruling, Justice Scalia noted that:

- 11 U.S.C. § 105(a) grants a bankruptcy court authority to "issue any order, process, or judgment that is necessary or appropriate to carry out the provisions of" the Bankruptcy Code,
- the court also has inherent power to sanction abusive litigation practice, but
- a bankruptcy court may not contravene specific statutory provisions.

As 11 U.S.C. § 522(k) expressly states that a homestead exemption is "not liable for payment of any administrative expense," the court exceeded the limits of its authority under §105(a) and its inherent powers. The Court's ruling in Marrama would not have led to a different result, as its dictum only "suggests that in some circumstances a bankruptcy court may be authorized to dispense with futile procedural niceties in order to reach more expeditiously an end result required by the Code."

The bankruptcy court still has various sanctions available to enforce its judgments:

- 11 U.S.C. § 727(a) outlines circumstances where the court can deny a discharge from bankruptcy
- Federal Rules of Bankruptcy Procedure §9011 authorizes the court to impose sanctions for bad-faith litigation conduct
- it may also possess further sanctioning authority under either 11 U.S.C. § 105(a) or its inherent powers
- 11 U.S.C. § 727(b) provides that a bankruptcy court's monetary sanction survives the bankruptcy case and is thereafter enforceable through the normal procedures for collecting money judgments
- Fraudulent conduct in a bankruptcy case may also subject a debtor to criminal prosecution under 18 U.S.C. § 152, which carries a maximum penalty of five years' imprisonment

Justice Scalia acknowledged the seeming unfairness of the result:

We acknowledge that our ruling forces Siegel to shoulder a heavy financial burden resulting from Law's egregious misconduct, and that it may produce inequitable results for trustees and creditors in other cases. We have recognized, however, that in crafting the provisions of §522, "Congress balanced the difficult choices that exemption limits impose on debtors with the economic harm that exemptions visit on creditors." The same can be said of the limits imposed on recovery of administrative expenses by trustees. For the reasons we have explained, it is not for courts to alter the balance struck by the statute.

== Impact ==
The decision is described as "brisk and workmanlike," and "[t]he absence of qualifications or quibbles in its description of the relevant principles make it just the kind of opinion that is likely to be cited frequently in future briefs to the Court." Law is also seen as forcing trustees and creditors to be more aggressive, early in the case, either to object to exemptions or file a motion to extend the time to object to exemptions in order to provide enough time for investigation.

Justice Scalia did not note another sanction that is available under FRBP §4003 which provides that a trustee may still file an objection to a debtor’s claim of exemption "at any time prior to one year after the closing of the case, if the debtor fraudulently asserted the claim of exemption." However, this provision only came into effect in 2008, and therefore was not applicable in this case.

While equitable subordination is authorized under 11 U.S.C. § 502(b) as a remedy to ensure that creditors acting in bad faith will not be paid until other valid creditors are paid in full, the Bankruptcy Code does not explicitly provide for a similar "equitable disallowance" remedy with respect to debtors acting in bad faith. Although several of the lower courts had previously ruled in favour of such a remedy, (Note: Relying on Pepper v. Litton, 308 U.S. 295 (1939).) it appears that Law strongly supports the conclusion that equitable disallowance does not exist under the Code.

Law, together with Stern v. Marshall, can also be seen as another limitation on the bankruptcy courts' inherent authority under §105, thereby reducing the courts' flexibility and discretion that are necessary for the proper functioning of the bankruptcy system.
