= Atlantic Marine Construction Co. v. United States District Court =

Atlantic Marine Construction Co., Inc. v. United States District Court
- Supreme Court of the United States

Argued October 9, 2013 Decided December 3, 2013
- Full case name: Atlantic Marine Construction Co., Inc. v. United States District Court for the Western District of Texas
- Docket no.: 12-929
- Citations: 571 U.S. 49 (more) 134 S. Ct. 568; 187 L. Ed. 2d 487; 82 U.S.L.W. 4021
- Opinion announcement: Opinion announcement

Case history
- Prior: In re Atlantic Marine Construction Co., 701 F.3d 736 (5th Cir. 2012)

Holding
- A forum selection clause may be enforced by a motion to transfer under 28 U.S.C. 1404(a). When such a motion is filed, the district court should transfer the case except in limited and extraordinary circumstances.

Court membership
- Chief Justice John Roberts Associate Justices Antonin Scalia · Anthony Kennedy; Clarence Thomas · Ruth Bader Ginsburg; Stephen Breyer · Samuel Alito; Sonia Sotomayor · Elena Kagan

Case opinion
- Majority: Alito, joined by unanimous

Laws applied
- Title 28 United States Code Section 1404(a)

Atlantic Marine Construction Co., Inc. v. United States District Court for the Western District of Texas, 571 U.S. 49 (2013), was a United States Supreme Court decision dealing with the enforcement of forum selection clauses.

== Background ==
Petitioner, a corporate citizen of Virginia, entered into a contract to build a child development center in Fort Hood, Texas. The Petitioner then entered into a subcontract with a Texas corporation for work on the project. The contract specified that any litigation resulting from the contract would be brought in state court in Norfolk, Virginia or in the United States District Court for the Eastern District of Virginia. When a dispute arose under the contract, the Texas corporation filed suit in the United States District Court for the Western District of Texas, invoking that court's diversity jurisdiction. The Petitioner moved to dismiss the suit on the grounds that venue was "wrong" under 28 U.S.C. 1406(a) and "improper" under Federal Rule of Civil Procedure 12(b)(3), citing the contract's forum selection clause. In the alternative, the Petitioner sought transfer to the Eastern District of Virginia under 28 U.S.C. 1404(a). The district court denied both motions. On appeal, the United States Court of Appeals for the Fifth Circuit refused to grant a writ of mandamus directing the district court to grant either motion.

== Opinion ==
In a unanimous opinion authored by Associate Justice Samuel Alito, the Supreme Court clarified that the proper procedure to enforce a forum selection clause is through a motion to transfer under 28 U.S.C. 1404(a). When such a motion is made, the district court should grant it unless extraordinary circumstances counsel against doing so. Noting that Section 1404(a) does not provide for transfer to non-federal court venues, the Court said that the doctrine of forum non conveniens still exists within the federal courts. While that doctrine has been codified at Section 1404(a) for the federal system, the same factors that apply in analyzing motions under that statute can be used to transfer cases to non-federal forums.

== See also ==
- List of United States Supreme Court cases, volume 571
- List of United States Supreme Court cases
- Lists of United States Supreme Court cases by volume
- List of United States Supreme Court cases by the Roberts Court
