= 2013 term per curiam opinions of the Supreme Court of the United States =

The Supreme Court of the United States handed down eight per curiam opinions during its 2013 term, which began October 7, 2013 and concluded October 5, 2014.

Because per curiam decisions are issued from the Court as an institution, these opinions all lack the attribution of authorship or joining votes to specific justices. All justices on the Court at the time the decision was handed down are assumed to have participated and concurred unless otherwise noted.

== Court membership ==
Chief Justice: John Roberts

Associate Justices: Antonin Scalia, Anthony Kennedy, Clarence Thomas, Ruth Bader Ginsburg, Stephen Breyer, Samuel Alito, Sonia Sotomayor, Elena Kagan

== Stanton v. Sims ==
- Full caption: Mike Stanton v. Drendolyn Sims
- Citations: 571 U.S. 3
- Prior history: Summary judgment granted to defendant, No. 3:09-cv-01356 (S.D. Cal.); rev'd, 706 F. 3d 954 (9th Cir. 2013)
- Laws applied: U.S. Const. amend. IV
- Full text of the opinion: official slip opinion · Justia

571 U.S. 3
Decided November 4, 2013.
Ninth Circuit reversed and remanded.

A bystander was seriously injured when a police officer, in hot pursuit of a misdemeanor suspect, kicked open the gate to her yard. She sued the officer for violating her Fourth Amendment rights by his warrantless entry into the curtilage of her property, but the district court held that the officer was entitled to qualified immunity and granted him summary judgment. On appeal, the Ninth Circuit reversed, ruling that there was no basis for warrantless entry because there were no exigent circumstances and the fleeing suspect's alleged offense was minor.

The Supreme Court reversed the Ninth Circuit, finding that the officer was entitled to qualified immunity because there was not "clearly established law" on the issue. Instead, federal and state courts were "sharply divided on the question whether an officer with probable cause to arrest a suspect for a misdemeanor may enter a home without a warrant while in hot pursuit of that suspect." The officer could, therefore, not be found "plainly incompetent" in violating the plaintiff's constitutional rights.

== Ford Motor Co. v. United States ==
- Full caption: Ford Motor Company v. United States
- Citations: 571 U.S. 28
- Prior history: Judgment for defendant, E.D. Mich. June 3, 2010; aff'd, 508 Fed. Appx. 506 (6th Cir. 2012)
- Laws applied: 26 U.S.C. § 6611(b); 28 U.S.C. § 1346; 28 U.S.C. § 1491(a) (Tucker Act)
- Full text of the opinion: official slip opinion · Justia

571 U.S. 28
Decided December 2, 2013.
Sixth Circuit vacated and remanded for consideration of a new argument.

In this case, after the Internal Revenue Service advised Ford Motor Company that it had underpaid its taxes from 1983 until 1989, Ford remitted a series of deposits to the IRS totaling $875 million. Those deposits stopped the accrual of interest that Ford would otherwise owe once the audits were completed and the amount of its underpayment was finally determined. Later, Ford requested that the IRS treat the deposits as advance payments of the additional tax that Ford owed. Eventually the parties determined that Ford had overpaid its taxes in the relevant years, thereby entitling Ford to a return of the overpayment as well as interest. But the parties disagreed about when the interest began to run under 26 U.S.C. §6611(b)(1). Ford argued that "the date of overpayment" was the date that it first remitted the deposits to the IRS. The Government countered that the date of overpayment was the date that Ford requested that the IRS treat the remittances as payments of tax. The difference between the parties' competing interpretations of §6611(b) was worth some $445 million.

Ford sued the Government in federal District Court, asserting jurisdiction under 28 U.S.C. §1346(a)(1). The Government did not contest the court's jurisdiction. The District Court accepted the Government’s construction of §6611(b) and granted its motion for judgment on the pleadings. The Court of Appeals for the Sixth Circuit affirmed, concluding that §6611 is a waiver of sovereign immunity that must be construed strictly in favor of the Government.

Ford sought certiorari, arguing that the Sixth Circuit was wrong to give §6611 a strict construction. In Ford's view, it was 28 U. S. C. §1346—not §6611—that waived the Government's immunity from this suit, and §6611(b) was a substantive provision that should not be construed strictly. However, in its response to Ford's petition for certiorari, the Government contended for the first time that §1346(a)(1) did not apply at all to this suit; it argued that the only basis for jurisdiction, and "the only general waiver of sovereign immunity that encompasses [Ford’s] claim," was the Tucker Act. Although the Government acquiesced in jurisdiction in the lower courts, if the Government was correct that the Tucker Act applied to this suit, jurisdiction over this case would have been proper only in the United States Court of Federal Claims. The Supreme Court declined to hear this new argument itself and sent the case back to the Sixth Circuit so it could be argued there.

== Unite Here Local 355 v. Mulhall ==
- Full caption: Unite Here Local 355 v. Martin Mulhall et al.
- Citations: 571 U.S. 83
- Prior history: Complaint dismissed, No. 0:08-cv-61766-PAS (S.D. Fla. Apr. 22, 2009); rev'd, 618 F. 3d 1279 (11th Cir. 2010); complaint dismissed, No. 0:08-cv-61766-PAS, S.D. Fla.; rev'd, 667 F. 3d 1211 (11th Cir. 2012); cert. granted, 570 U.S. 915 (2013)
- Laws applied: 29 U.S.C. § 186 (section 302 of the Labor Management Relations Act)
- Full text of the opinion: official slip opinion · Justia

571 U.S. 83
Argued November 13, 2013.
Decided December 10, 2013.
The Court dismissed the writ of certiorari as improvidently granted.

Breyer filed a dissent, joined by Sotomayor and Kagan.

== Hinton v. Alabama ==
- Full caption: Anthony Ray Hinton v. Alabama
- Citations: 571 U.S. 263
- Prior history: Postconviction petition denied, Ala. Cir. Ct.; aff'd, 2006 WL 1125605 (Ala. Crim. App., Apr. 28, 2006); rev'd and remanded, 2008 WL 4603723 (Ala. Oct. 17, 2008); remanded, 8 WL 5517591 (Ala. Crim. App., Dec. 19, 2008); aff'd, CR-04-0940, (Ala. Crim. App., Aug. 26, 2011); rev'd and remanded, sub nom. Ex Parte Hinton, No. 1110129 (Ala., Nov. 9, 2012); aff'd, sub nom. Hinton v. State, CR-04-0940 (Ala. Crim. App, Feb. 15, 2013); review denied, No. 1110129 (Ala., 2013)
- Laws applied: U.S. Const. amend. VI
- Full text of the opinion: official slip opinion · Justia

571 U.S. 263
Decided February 24, 2014.
Court of Criminal Appeals of Alabama vacated and remanded.

In a capital case, it is ineffective assistance of counsel for the defendant's lawyer to fail to seek additional funds for an expert witness when that lawyer knows the current witness is not adequate and the decision not to seek the funds was not strategic. In this case, the defense attorney mistaken believed that available funding was capped at $1,000. The Supreme Court summarily vacated the judgment below and remanded the case for reconsideration of whether the attorney's deficient performance was prejudicial under the other required part of the Strickland v. Washington test.

== Tolan v. Cotton ==
See also: Robbie Tolan shooting incident

- Full caption: Robert R. Tolan v. Jeffrey Wayne Cotton
- Citations: 572 U.S. 650
- Prior history: Summary judgment granted to defendant, 854 F. Supp. 2d 444 (S.D. Tex. 2012); aff'd, 713 F. 3d 299 (5th Cir. 2013); rehearing en banc denied, 538 Fed. Appx. 374 (5th Cir. 2013)
- Laws applied: Fed. R. Civ. P. 56
- Full text of the opinion: official slip opinion · FindLaw

572 U.S. 650
Decided May 5, 2014.
Fifth Circuit vacated and remanded.

Alito filed an opinion concurring in the judgment, joined by Scalia.

== Martinez v. Illinois ==
- Full caption: Esteban Martinez v. Illinois
- Citations: 572 U.S. 833
- Prior history: Directed verdict for defendant, Ill. Cir. Ct., Kane Cty., May 17, 2010; rev'd, 969 N.E. 2d 840 (Ill. App. Ct. 2011); aff'd, 990 N.E. 2d 215 (Ill. 2013)
- Laws applied: U.S. Const. amend. V
- Full text of the opinion: official slip opinion · Cornell

572 U.S. 833
Decided May 27, 2014.
The trial of Esteban Martinez was set to begin on May 17, 2010. His counsel was ready; the State was not. When the court swore in the jury and invited the State to present its first witness, the State declined to present any evidence. So Martinez moved for a directed not-guilty verdict, and the court granted it. The State appealed, arguing that the trial court should have granted its motion for a continuance. The question in the appeal was whether the Double Jeopardy Clause barred the State's attempt to appeal in the hope of subjecting Martinez to a new trial.

The Supreme Court held that the Illinois Supreme Court manifestly erred in allowing the State's appeal, on the theory that jeopardy never attached because Martinez "was never at risk of conviction." The Supreme Court's precedent on this issue reflects a bright-line rule that "jeopardy attaches when the jury is empaneled and sworn," as it was stated in Crist v. Bretz. The court said "There is simply no doubt that Martinez was subjected to jeopardy. And because the trial court found the State’s evidence insufficient to sustain a conviction, there is equally no doubt that Martinez may not be retried."

Supreme Court of Illinois reversed and remanded.

== Williams v. Johnson ==
- Full caption: Tara Sheneva Williams v. Deborah K. Johnson, Acting Warden
- Citations: 573 U.S. 773
- Laws applied: U.S. Const. amend. VI
- Full text of the opinion: official slip opinion · Oyez

573 U.S. 773
Decided July 1, 2014.
Ninth Circuit vacated and remanded.

== See also ==
- List of United States Supreme Court cases, volume 571
- List of United States Supreme Court cases, volume 572
- List of United States Supreme Court cases, volume 573
