= Kaley v. United States =

- Supreme Court of the United States

Decided February 25, 2014
- Full case name: Kaley v. United States
- Citations: 571 U.S. 320 (more)

Holding
- A criminal defendant who has been indicted is not constitutionally entitled to contest a grand jury's determination of probable cause to believe the defendant committed the crimes charged when challenging the legality of a pre-trial asset seizure.

Court membership
- Chief Justice John Roberts Associate Justices Antonin Scalia · Anthony Kennedy; Clarence Thomas · Ruth Bader Ginsburg; Stephen Breyer · Samuel Alito; Sonia Sotomayor · Elena Kagan

Case opinions
- Majority: Kagan
- Dissent: Roberts, joined by Breyer, Sotomayor

Kaley v. United States, 571 U.S. 320 (2014), was a United States Supreme Court case in which the court held that a criminal defendant who has been indicted is not constitutionally entitled to contest a grand jury's determination of probable cause to believe the defendant committed the crimes charged when challenging the legality of a pre-trial asset seizure.

== Background ==
Title 21 U. S. C. §853(e)(1) empowers courts to enter pre-trial restraining orders to "preserve the availability of [forfeitable] property" while criminal proceedings are pending. Such pre-trial asset restraints are constitutionally permissible whenever probable cause exists to think that a defendant has committed an offense permitting forfeiture and that the assets in dispute are traceable or otherwise sufficiently related to the crime charged.

After a grand jury indicted Kerri and Brian Kaley for reselling stolen medical devices and laundering the proceeds, the government obtained a §853(e)(1) restraining order against their assets. The Kaleys moved to vacate the order, intending to use a portion of the disputed assets for their legal fees. The federal district court allowed them to challenge the assets' traceability to the offenses in question but not the facts supporting the underlying indictment. The Eleventh Circuit Court of Appeals affirmed.

== Opinion of the court ==
The Supreme Court issued an opinion on February 25, 2014.
