= Aviation and Transportation Security Act =

2001 US act of Congress

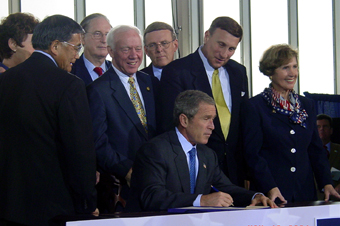
President George W. Bush signs the Aviation and Transportation Security Act into law on November 19, 2001

The Aviation and Transportation Security Act (ATSA, Pub. L. 107–71 (text) (PDF) November 19, 2001) was enacted by the 107th United States Congress in the immediate aftermath of the September 11, 2001 attacks. The Act created the Transportation Security Administration (TSA). However, with the passage of the Homeland Security Act in 2002, the TSA was later transferred to the Department of Homeland Security. The legislation (S. 1447) was sponsored by Democratic Senator Fritz Hollings from South Carolina and co-sponsored by 30 other senators.

Prior to ATSA, passenger screening was the responsibility of airlines, with the actual duties of operating the screening checkpoint contracted-out to private firms such as Wackenhut, Globe, and ITS.

Ticket counter agents were required to ask two questions of passengers checking luggage:

- Have any of the items you're traveling with been out of your immediate control since the time you packed them?
- Has anyone unknown to you asked you to carry an item aboard the aircraft?

Visitors had to pass through metal detectors and have their carry-on luggage X-rayed before entering the concourses. Photo ID was not required, as at that time the sterile concourse was still viewed as a public area.
