= Heimeshoff v. Hartford Life & Accident Insurance Co. =

Heimeshoff v. Hartford Life & Accident Insurance Co. and Wal-Mart Stores, Inc.
- Supreme Court of the United States

Argued October 15, 2013 Decided December 16, 2013
- Full case name: Heimeshoff v. Hartford Life & Accident Insurance Co. and Wal-Mart Stores, Inc.
- Docket no.: 12-729
- Citations: 571 U.S. 99 (more) 134 S. Ct. 604; 187 L. Ed. 2d 529; 2013 U.S. LEXIS 9026; 82 U.S.L.W. 4035; 57 EBC 1265
- Argument: Oral argument

Case history
- Prior: Case dismissed, No. 3:10-cv-1813 (D. Conn. Jan. 20, 2012); affirmed, 496 F. App'x 129 (2d Cir. Ct. 2012).

Holding
- Absent a controlling statute to the contrary, a participant in an employee benefit plan covered by the Employee Retirement Income Security Act of 1974 (ERISA) and the plan may agree by contract to a particular limitations period, even one that starts to run before the cause of action accrues, as long as the period is reasonable.

Court membership
- Chief Justice John Roberts Associate Justices Antonin Scalia · Anthony Kennedy; Clarence Thomas · Ruth Bader Ginsburg; Stephen Breyer · Samuel Alito; Sonia Sotomayor · Elena Kagan

Case opinion
- Majority: Thomas, joined by unanimous

Laws applied
- Employee Retirement Income Security Act

Heimeshoff v. Hartford Life & Accident Ins. Co., 571 U.S. 99 (2013), is a United States Supreme Court case. In this case, the court considered whether the agreed-upon limitations period for filing a legal objection to long-term disability denial began when the claim was filed or the claim received a final denial. In a unanimous decision, the court ruled the agreed-upon limitations period is neither too short nor is there a statute that prevents it from taking effect, as such the courts are bound to enforce the limitations period and its start date as written in the coverage plan.

== Background ==
Hartford Life and Accident Insurance Company (Hartford) is the administrator of Wal-Mart Stores, Inc.'s (Wal-Mart) Group Long Term Disability Plan (Plan), an employee benefit plan covered by the Employee Retirement Income Security Act of 1974 (ERISA). The Plan's insurance policy requires any suit to recover benefits pursuant to the judicial review provision in ERISA, to be filed within three years after "proof of loss" is due. Heimeshoff filed a claim for long-term disability benefits with Hartford. After petitioner exhausted the mandatory administrative review process, Hartford issued its final denial. Almost three years after that final denial but more than three years after proof of loss was due, Heimeshoff filed a claim for judicial review pursuant to ERISA. Hartford and Wal-Mart moved to dismiss on the ground that the claim was untimely. The District Court granted the motion, recognizing that while ERISA does not provide a statute of limitations, the contractual 3-year limitations period was enforceable under applicable State law and Circuit precedent. The Second Circuit affirmed.
