= Burrage v. United States =

- Supreme Court of the United States

Argued November 12, 2013 Decided January 27, 2014
- Full case name: Marcus Andrew Burrage, Petitioner v. United States
- Docket no.: 12-7515
- Citations: 571 U.S. 204 (more) 134 S. Ct. 881; 187 L. Ed. 2d 715; 2014 U.S. LEXIS 797; 82 U.S.L.W. 4076
- Argument: Oral argument

Case history
- Prior: 687 F.3d 1015 (reversed and remanded)

Holding
- At least when the use of a drug distributed by the defendant is not an independently sufficient cause of the victim's death or serious bodily injury, a defendant cannot be liable for penalty enhancement under the penalty enhancement provision of the Controlled Substance Act unless such use is a but-for cause of the death or injury.

Court membership
- Chief Justice John Roberts Associate Justices Antonin Scalia · Anthony Kennedy; Clarence Thomas · Ruth Bader Ginsburg; Stephen Breyer · Samuel Alito; Sonia Sotomayor · Elena Kagan

Case opinions
- Majority: Scalia, joined by Roberts, Kennedy, Thomas, Breyer, Kagan; Alito (all but Part III–B)
- Concurrence: Ginsburg (in judgment), joined by Sotomayor

Laws applied
- Controlled Substances Act

Burrage v. United States, 571 U.S. 204 (2014), was a United States Supreme Court case in which a unanimous Court held that a defendant cannot be liable for penalty enhancement under the penalty enhancement provision of the Controlled Substances Act unless such use is a but-for cause of the death or injury, at least when the use of a drug distributed by the defendant is not an independently sufficient cause of the victim's death or serious bodily injury.

== Background ==
After an extended drug binge which began on April 14, 2010, involving marijuana, oxycodone (which he stole from a roommate), and heroin, Joshua Banka died on April 15. His wife found his body late that morning; they had purchased heroin together from Marcus Burrage in Story County, Iowa. When police searched their home and vehicle, they found syringes, 0.59 grams of heroin, alprazolam and clonazepam tablets, oxycodone pills, a bottle of hydrocodone, and other drugs.

Burrage pleaded not guilty to a superseding indictment alleging two counts of distributing heroin in violation of 21 U.S.C. § 841(a)(1). Only one of those offenses, count 2, which alleged that Burrage unlawfully distributed heroin on April 14, 2010, and that "death...resulted from the use of th[at] substance"—thus subjecting Burrage to the 20 year mandatory minimum of 21 U.S.C. § 841(b)(1)(C), was at issue in the case.

Two medical experts testified at trial regarding the cause of Banka's death. One, a forensic toxicologist, determined that multiple drugs were present but could not say whether Banka would have lived if he had not taken the heroin, though he concluded that the drug was a factor in Banka's death. Another, an Iowa state medical examiner, similarly could not determine whether Banka would have lived had he not taken the heroin, but said that his death would have been much less likely.

Burrage moved for acquittal because Banka's death was not "because of" the heroin (there was no evidence that heroin was a but-for cause of death), but the motion was denied. The district court also declined giving Burrage's proposed jury instructions, including requiring the government to prove that heroin use "was the proximate cause of [Banka’s] death." Instead, the court instructed the jury to determine if "the heroin distributed by [Burrage] was a contributing cause of Joshua Banka's death." The jury convicted him and the court sentenced him to 20 years' imprisonment, consistent with the minimum sentence in the law. The Eighth Circuit affirmed Burrage's convictions.

The Court heard oral argument on November 12, 2013. Angela L. Campbell was appointed by the Court to argue for the petitioner, and Benjamin Horwich, assistant to the Solicitor General, argued for the United States.

== Supreme Court ==
Writing for the majority, Associate Justice Justice Antonin Scalia held that the law considers causation as a hybrid between two constituent parts: actual cause, or cause-in-fact, and legal cause, which is also known as proximate cause. Because the cause-in-fact requirement was not met in this case, the Court did not rule on whether the crime of distribution of drugs causing death required a foreseeability or proximate cause requirement. Instead, the Court focused on the specific text found in 21 U.S.C. § 841(b), the federal law requiring heightened sentences for drug sales causing death or serious bodily injury. The language in that statute requires that the death “results from” the sale of illegal drugs. Because the deceased in this case was found with multiple drugs in his system, the heroin sold by the defendant could not be considered an independently sufficient cause of death.

=== Concurrence ===
Associate Justice Ginsburg wrote an opinion concurring in the judgment, joined by Associate Justice Sotomayor, while objecting to an analogy made in the opinion that compared the "results from" language in drug statutes to similar language found in Title VII's anti-retaliation provision. Citing her dissent in University of Texas Southwestern Medical Center v. Nassar, 570 U.S. 338 (2013), she argued that the Court's interpretation of similar language (in that case, "because of") lacked sensitivity to real-life concerns.
