= Mississippi ex rel. Hood v. AU Optronics Corp. =

- Supreme Court of the United States

Argued November 6, 2013 Decided January 14, 2014
- Full case name: Mississippi ex rel. Hood v. AU Optronics Corp.
- Docket no.: 12-1036
- Citations: 571 U.S. 161 (more) 134 S. Ct. 736; 187 L. Ed. 2d 654; 2014 U.S. LEXIS 645; 82 U.S.L.W. 4056
- Argument: Oral argument
- Opinion announcement: Opinion announcement

Case history
- Prior: Petitioners motion granted, US Dis. Ct.; reversed, 701 F.3d 796 (5th Cir. 2012)

Holding
- Under the Class Action Fairness Act, because Mississippi is the only named plaintiff, the suit does not qualify as a "mass action" – that is, a civil action "in which monetary relief claims of 100 or more persons are proposed to be tried jointly on the ground that the plaintiff's claims involve common questions of law or fact."

Court membership
- Chief Justice John Roberts Associate Justices Antonin Scalia · Anthony Kennedy; Clarence Thomas · Ruth Bader Ginsburg; Stephen Breyer · Samuel Alito; Sonia Sotomayor · Elena Kagan

Case opinion
- Majority: Sotomayor, joined by unanimous

Laws applied
- Class Action Fairness Act of 2005

Mississippi ex rel. Hood v. AU Optronics Corp., 571 U.S. 161 (2014), was a United States Supreme Court case in which the Court determined whether a class-action suit was properly removed to federal district court as a mass action under the Class Action Fairness Act. The court unanimously determined (Justice Sotomayor delivering the court's opinion) that since the state of Mississippi was the sole plaintiff in the lawsuit, the case did not constitute a mass action for the purposes of the Act.

The case turned on a question of statutory construction. The Act defined a mass action as 'any civil action ... in which monetary relief claims of 100 or more persons are proposed to be tried jointly on the ground that the plaintiffs' claims involve common questions of law or fact'. The State of Mississippi sought restitution from a liquid crystal display (LCD) manufacturer, including restitution for purchases of LCD products made by Mississippi citizens. The court held that the reference in the Act to '100 or more persons' referred to actual plaintiffs and not to any individuals (in this case, unnamed Mississippi citizens) who may have an interest in, or benefit from, the action.
