= Walden v. Fiore =

- Supreme Court of the United States

Decided February 25, 2014
- Full case name: Walden v. Fiore
- Citations: 571 U.S. 277 (more)

Holding
- For a state to exercise personal jurisdiction over a defendant, its relationship with the defendant must arise out of contacts that the defendant created with the forum; the plaintiff cannot be the only link between the defendant and the forum.

Court membership
- Chief Justice John Roberts Associate Justices Antonin Scalia · Anthony Kennedy; Clarence Thomas · Ruth Bader Ginsburg; Stephen Breyer · Samuel Alito; Sonia Sotomayor · Elena Kagan

Case opinion
- Majority: Thomas, joined by unanimous

Laws applied
- U.S. Const. Amend. V

Walden v. Fiore, 571 U.S. 277 (2014), was a United States Supreme Court case in which the court held that for a state to exercise personal jurisdiction over a defendant, its relationship with the defendant must arise out of contacts that the defendant created with the forum; the plaintiff cannot be the only link between the defendant and the forum.

== Background ==
Anthony Walden, a Georgia police officer working as a deputized Drug Enforcement Administration agent at a Georgia airport, searched respondents and seized a large amount of cash. The plaintiffs, including Gina Fiore, alleged that, after they returned to their Nevada residence, Walden helped draft a false probable cause affidavit in support of the funds' forfeiture and forwarded it to a United States Attorney's Office in Georgia. In the end, no forfeiture complaint was filed, and the plaintiffs' funds were returned. The plaintiffs filed a tort suit against Walden in federal district court in Nevada. The district court dismissed the suit, finding that the Georgia search and seizure did not establish a basis to exercise personal jurisdiction in Nevada. The Ninth Circuit Court of Appeals reversed, holding that the district court could properly exercise jurisdiction because Walden had submitted the false probable cause affidavit with the knowledge that it would affect persons with significant Nevada connections.

== Opinion of the court ==
The Supreme Court issued an opinion on February 25, 2014. Justice Thomas, writing for a unanimous Court, reversed the decision of the Ninth Circuit, holding that the District Court in Nevada could not exercise jurisdiction over Walden.

The Court ruled that States may exercise jurisdiction over non-resident defendants, but only in cases where "the defendant’s suit-related conduct . . . create[s] a substantial connection with the forum State." The Court issued two related clarifications: first, that such a connection "must arise out of contacts that the 'defendant himself' creates with the forum State"; second, that the connection must relate to "the forum State itself, not the defendant’s contacts with persons who reside there." Because all of Walden's actions took place in Georgia, the only link between him and Nevada was his contact with the plaintiffs. Summarizing the holding, Thomas concluded that "the mere fact that his conduct affected plaintiffs with connections to the forum State does not suffice to authorize jurisdiction."

At oral argument, plaintiffs' counsel suggested that the case was really about Internet commerce. In particular, the plaintiffs argued that, if Nevada lacked jurisdiction over Walden, all states would lack jurisdiction over persons conducting fraudulent schemes conducted over the Internet from other states. The Court reserved this argument for the future, stating in a footnote that it would "leave questions about virtual contacts for another day."
