= Kansas v. Cheever =

- Supreme Court of the United States

Argued October 16, 2013 Decided December 11, 2013
- Full case name: Kansas, Petitioner v. Scott D. Cheever
- Docket no.: 12-609
- Citations: 571 U.S. 87 (more) 134 S. Ct. 596; 187 L. Ed. 2d 519; 2013 U.S. LEXIS 9020; 82 U.S.L.W. 4032
- Argument: Oral argument

Case history
- Prior: 295 Kan. 229, 284 P. 3d 1007 (vacated and remanded)

Holding
- The Fifth Amendment does not prevent the prosecution from introducing psychiatric evidence to rebut psychiatric evidence presented by the defense.

Court membership
- Chief Justice John Roberts Associate Justices Antonin Scalia · Anthony Kennedy; Clarence Thomas · Ruth Bader Ginsburg; Stephen Breyer · Samuel Alito; Sonia Sotomayor · Elena Kagan

Case opinion
- Majority: Sotomayor, joined by unanimous

Laws applied
- U.S. Const., amend. V

Scott Cheever
- Born: Scott Dever Cheever
- Status: Death row inmate
- Motive: Drug raid shooting
- Criminal charges: Capital murder
- Penalty: Death

Details
- Victims: 1
- Date: January 19, 2005
- Country: United States
- State: Kansas
- Targets: Matthew Samuels, a sheriff of Greenwood County, Kansas
- Weapon: .44 magnum revolver

Kansas v. Cheever, 571 U.S. 87 (2013), was a United States Supreme Court case in which a unanimous Court held that the Fifth Amendment does not prevent the prosecution from introducing psychiatric evidence to rebut psychiatric evidence presented by the defense.

== Background ==
In January 2005, Scott Cheever shot and killed Greenwood County Sheriff Matthew Samuels at the residence of Darrell and Belinda Coopers in Hilltop, Kansas. When Samuels arrived, the Coopers, Cheever, and two others were using methamphetamines. At the time, Cheever had an outstanding warrant for which Samuels would arrest him.

At trial, Cheever asserted a voluntary intoxication defense and argued that the methamphetamine use rendered him mentally incapable of the premeditation required for murder. During the trial, the judge ordered Cheever to undergo a psychiatric examination conducted by a psychiatrist hired by the government. The prosecution sought to bring the interview transcript into evidence to impeach Cheever's testimony regarding the order of events at the Coopers' residence, which the court allowed. After the defense rested their case, the prosecution called the psychiatrist to the stand as a rebuttal witness to respond to the defense's claims regarding Cheever's mental capacity at the time of the crime. The trial court allowed the psychiatrist's testimony as a rebuttal witness. The jury found Cheever guilty and, at a separate sentencing hearing, sentenced him to death. The Kansas Supreme Court held that the admission of the government psychiatrist's testimony into evidence violated Cheever's Fifth Amendment rights.

== Opinion of the Court ==
Justice Sotomayor delivered the opinion of the Court.

Reaffirming its prior ruling in Buchanan v. Kentucky, 483 U.S. 402 (1987), the Court held that when "a defense expert who has examined the defendant testifies that the defendant lacked the requisite mental state to commit an offense, the prosecution may present psychiatric evidence in rebuttal." Not allowing this would "undermine the adversarial process" and permit a defendant to provide "a one-sided and potentially inaccurate view of his mental state" at the time of the crime, through an expert. The Fifth Amendment does not permit a defendant who chooses to testify to refuse to submit to cross-examination.

The Court also drew a distinction between "mental status," at issue in Buchanan, and "mental disease or defect," a provision of Kansas law which does not include voluntary intoxication, calling the former a broader term than the latter. Kansas' usage of the court-ordered exam to rebut the voluntary-intoxication defense is not prohibited by the Fifth Amendment.
