= List of United States Supreme Court cases, volume 571 =

This is a list of all the United States Supreme Court cases from volume 571 of the United States Reports:

Case name	Citation	Date decided
Madigan v. Levin	571 U.S. 1	October 15, 2013
Dismissed as improvidently granted.
Stanton v. Sims	571 U.S. 3	November 4, 2013
The officer was entitled to qualified immunity because there was not "clearly established law" on the issue. Federal and state courts were "sharply divided on the question whether an officer with probable cause to arrest a suspect for a misdemeanor may enter a home without a warrant while in hot pursuit of that suspect." The officer could, therefore, not be found "plainly incompetent" in violating the plaintiff's constitutional rights.
Burt v. Titlow	571 U.S. 12	November 5, 2013
Federal courts must defer to a state court's finding of fact as long as it is reasonable.
Ford Motor Co. v. United States	571 U.S. 28	December 2, 2013
Although the Government acquiesced in jurisdiction in the lower courts, if the Government was correct that the Tucker Act applied to this suit, jurisdiction over this case would have been proper only in the United States Court of Federal Claims. The Supreme Court declined to hear this argument made for the first time in the Government's reply to Ford's certiorari petition. Instead, it sent the case back to the Sixth Circuit so the argument could be made there.
United States v. Woods	571 U.S. 31	December 3, 2013
The district court had jurisdiction to determine whether the partnerships' lack of economic substance could justify imposing a valuation-misstatement penalty on the partners.
Atlantic Marine Constr. Co. v. U.S. Dist. Court for Western Dist. of Tex.	571 U.S. 49	December 3, 2013
A forum selection clause may be enforced by a motion to transfer under 28 U.S.C. 1404(a). When such a motion is filed, the district court should transfer the case except in limited and extraordinary circumstances.
Sprint Commc'ns, Inc. v. Jacobs	571 U.S. 69	December 10, 2013
Federal court abstention under the Younger v. Harris doctrine is not in order simply because a pending state-court proceeding involves the same subject matter.
Unite Here Local 355 v. Mulhall	571 U.S. 83	December 10, 2013
Dismissed as improvidently granted. Breyer filed a dissent, joined by Sotomayor and Kagan.
Kansas v. Cheever	571 U.S. 87	December 11, 2013
The Fifth Amendment does not prevent the prosecution from introducing psychiatric evidence to rebut psychiatric evidence presented by the defense.
Heimeshoff v. Hartford Life & Accident Ins. Co.	571 U.S. 99	December 16, 2013
Absent a controlling statute to the contrary, a participant in an employee benefit plan covered by the Employee Retirement Income Security Act of 1974 (ERISA) and the plan may agree by contract to a particular limitations period, even one that starts to run before the cause of action accrues, as long as the period is reasonable.
Daimler AG v. Bauman	571 U.S. 117	January 14, 2014
Daimler cannot be sued in California for injuries allegedly caused by conduct of its Argentinian subsidiary when that conduct took place entirely outside of the United States.
Mississippi ex rel. Hood v. AU Optronics Corp.	571 U.S. 161	January 14, 2014
Under the Class Action Fairness Act, because Mississippi is the only named plaintiff, the suit does not qualify as a "mass action" – that is, a civil action "in which monetary relief claims of 100 or more persons are proposed to be tried jointly on the ground that the plaintiff's claims involve common questions of law or fact."
Ray Haluch Gravel Co. v. Cent. Pension Fund of Operating Eng'rs & Participating Emp'rs	571 U.S. 177	January 15, 2014
Any judgment on the merits is a final decision, even if there are outstanding questions about the accounting of a compensatory award or attorney's fees.
Medtronic, Inc. v. Mirowski Family Ventures, LLC	571 U.S. 191	January 22, 2014
When a licensee seeks a declaratory judgment against a patentee that its products do not infringe the licensed patent, the patentee bears the burden of persuasion on the issue of infringement.
Burrage v. United States	571 U.S. 204	January 27, 2014
At least when the use of a drug distributed by the defendant is not an independently sufficient cause of the victim's death or serious bodily injury, a defendant cannot be liable for penalty enhancement under the penalty enhancement provision of the Controlled Substance Act unless such use is a but-for cause of the death or injury.
Sandifer v. U.S. Steel Corp.	571 U.S. 220	January 27, 2014
Time spent donning and doffing protective gear is time spent "changing clothes," so the Fair Labor Standards Act of 1938 allows unions and employers to agree that workers will not be paid for that time.
Air Wis. Airlines Corp. v. Hoeper	571 U.S. 237	January 27, 2014
Under the Aviation and Transportation Security Act, airlines and their employees are immune from civil liability for reporting suspicious behavior so long as the reporting statements are "materially true."
Hinton v. Alabama	571 U.S. 263	February 24, 2014
In a capital case, it is ineffective assistance of counsel for the defendant's lawyer to fail to seek additional funds for an expert witness when that lawyer knows the current witness is not adequate and the decision not to seek the funds was not strategic. In this case, the defense attorney mistaken believed that available funding was capped at $1,000. The Supreme Court summarily vacated the judgment below and remanded the case for reconsideration of whether the attorney's deficient performance was prejudicial under the other required part of the Strickland v. Washington test.
Walden v. Fiore	571 U.S. 277	February 25, 2014
For a state to exercise personal jurisdiction over a defendant, its relationship with the defendant must arise out of contacts that the defendant created with the forum; the plaintiff cannot be the only link between the defendant and the forum.
Fernandez v. California	571 U.S. 292	February 25, 2014
When a resident who objects to the search of his dwelling is removed for objectively reasonable purposes (such as lawful arrest), the remaining resident may validly consent to search.
Kaley v. United States	571 U.S. 320	February 25, 2014
A criminal defendant who has been indicted is not constitutionally entitled to contest a grand jury's determination of probable cause to believe the defendant committed the crimes charged when challenging the legality of a pre-trial asset seizure.
United States v. Apel	571 U.S. 359	February 26, 2014
A "military installation" for purposes of determining whether someone has trespassed after being ordered to leave by a commanding officer encompasses the commanding officer's entire area of responsibility, and it includes areas within the base where the public may visit through easements.
Chadbourne & Parke, LLP v. Troice	571 U.S. 377	February 26, 2014
The Securities Litigation Uniform Standards Act does not preclude civil class actions under state law.
Law v. Siegel	571 U.S. 415	March 4, 2014
Whatever other sanctions a bankruptcy court may impose on a dishonest debtor, it may not contravene express provisions of the Bankruptcy Code by ordering that the debtor’s exempt property be used to pay debts and expenses for which that property is not liable under the Code.
Lawson v. FMR, LLC	571 U.S. 429	March 4, 2014
The Sarbanes–Oxley Act grants whistleblower protection to employees of public companies and also to employees of a public company's private contractors and subcontractors.
