= 2013 term United States Supreme Court opinions of Samuel Alito =

The 2013 term of the Supreme Court of the United States began October 7, 2013, and concluded October 5, 2014. This was the ninth term of Associate Justice Samuel Alito's tenure on the Court.
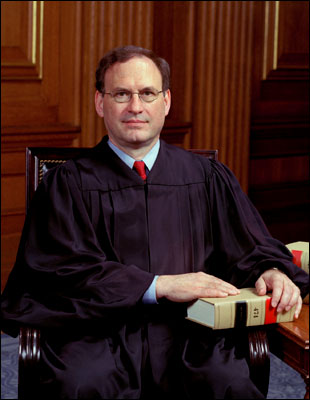

Samuel Alito 2013 term statistics

8	Majority or plurality	9	Concurrence	2	Other
5	Dissent	2	Concurrence/dissent	Total =	26
Bench opinions = 21		Opinions relating to orders = 5		In-chambers opinions = 0
Unanimous opinions: 3		Most joined by: Scalia (14)		Least joined by: Ginsburg (3 in full, 1 in part)

Type	Case	Citation	Issues	Joined by	Other opinions
	Burt v. Titlow	571 U.S. ___ (2013)	Sixth Amendment • ineffective assistance of counsel	Roberts, Scalia, Kennedy, Thomas, Breyer, Sotomayor, Kagan	Ginsburg; Sotomayor
	Unger v. Young	571 U.S. ___ (2013)	independent source for in-court witness identification • Antiterrorism and Effective Death Penalty Act of 1996	Scalia	
Alito dissented from the Court's denial of certiorari.
	Rapelje v. McClellan	571 U.S. ___ (2013)	habeas corpus • presumption that state court summary disposition was on the merits	Scalia	
Alito dissented from the Court's denial of certiorari.
	Martin v. Blessing	571 U.S. ___ (2013)	adequacy of counsel in class actions • Article III • standing		
Alito filed a statement respecting the Court's denial of certiorari.
	Atlantic Marine Constr. Co. v. United States Dist. Court for Western Dist. of Tex.	571 U.S. ___ (2013)	forum selection clause • change of venue	Unanimous	
	Fernandez v. California	571 U.S. ___ (2014)	Fourth Amendment • warrantless searches • consent of co-occupant to search	Roberts, Scalia, Kennedy, Thomas, Breyer	Scalia; Thomas; Ginsburg
	United States v. Apel	571 U.S. ___ (2014)	review of issue not addressed by lower court		Roberts; Ginsburg
	Lozano v. Montoya Alvarez	572 U.S. ___ (2014)	Hague Convention on the Civil Aspects of International Child Abduction • equitable tolling	Breyer, Sotomayor	Thomas
	Rosemond v. United States	572 U.S. ___ (2014)	aiding and abetting use of gun in drug trafficking crime • advance knowledge of confederate's use of gun	Thomas	Kagan
	United States v. Castleman	572 U.S. ___ (2014)	possession of firearms by those convicted of misdemeanor crimes of domestic violence	Thomas	Sotomayor; Scalia
	Northwest, Inc. v. Ginsberg	572 U.S. ___ (2014)	Airline Deregulation Act of 1978 • federal preemption • implied covenant of good faith and fair dealing	Unanimous	
	Town of Greece v. Galloway	572 U.S. ___ (2014)	First Amendment • Establishment Clause • legislative prayer	Scalia	Kennedy; Thomas; Breyer; Kagan
	Tolan v. Cotton	572 U.S. ___ (2014)	summary judgment	Scalia	per curiam
	Beard v. Aguilar	572 U.S. ___ (2014)		Scalia	
Alito dissented from the Court's denial of certiorari.
	Hall v. Florida	572 U.S. ___ (2014)	Eighth Amendment • capital punishment • execution of the mentally disabled	Roberts, Scalia, Thomas	Kennedy
	Plumhoff v. Rickard	572 U.S. ___ (2014)	Fourth Amendment • excessive force • car chase • qualified immunity • appellate jurisdiction over final decisions	Roberts, Scalia, Kennedy, Thomas, Sotomayor, Kagan; Ginsburg, Breyer, (in part)	
	Bond v. United States	572 U.S. ___ (2014)	Chemical Weapons Convention Implementation Act of 1998		Roberts; Scalia; Thomas
	Limelight Networks, Inc. v. Akamai Technologies, Inc.	572 U.S. ___ (2014)	patent law • inducement of infringement	Unanimous	
	Scialabba v. Cuellar de Osorio	573 U.S. ___ (2014)	Immigration and Nationality Act • priority date for visa eligibility • Child Status Protection Act		Kagan; Roberts; Sotomayor
	Utility Air Regulatory Group v. EPA	573 U.S. ___ (2014)	Clean Air Act • regulation of greenhouse gases • Prevention of Significant Deterioration permits for stationary pollution emitters	Thomas	Scalia; Breyer
	Loughrin v. United States	573 U.S. ___ (2014)	federal bank fraud • intent to defraud a financial institution		Kagan; Scalia
	Riley v. California	573 U.S. ___ (2014)	Fourth Amendment • warrantless search of cell phone data incident to arrest		Roberts
	McCullen v. Coakley	573 U.S. ___ (2014)	buffer zone around abortion clinics • First Amendment • free speech • public forum doctrine • content neutrality		Roberts; Scalia
	Harris v. Quinn	573 U.S. ___ (2014)	imposition of labor union fees on non-member public employees • First Amendment • speech by government employees	Roberts, Scalia, Kennedy, Thomas	Kagan
	Burwell v. Hobby Lobby Stores, Inc.	573 U.S. ___ (2014)	Religious Freedom Restoration Act • Affordable Care Act • contraceptive mandate • religious-based objection by for-profit corporation	Roberts, Scalia, Kennedy, Thomas	Kennedy; Ginsburg; Breyer and Kagan
	Mount Soledad Memorial Assn. v. Trunk	573 U.S. ___ (2014)	petition for certiorari before judgment		
Alito filed a statement respecting the Court's denial of certiorari.
