= 2013 term United States Supreme Court opinions of Antonin Scalia =

The 2013 term of the Supreme Court of the United States began October 7, 2013, and concluded October 5, 2014. This was the twenty-eighth term of Associate Justice Antonin Scalia's tenure on the Court.
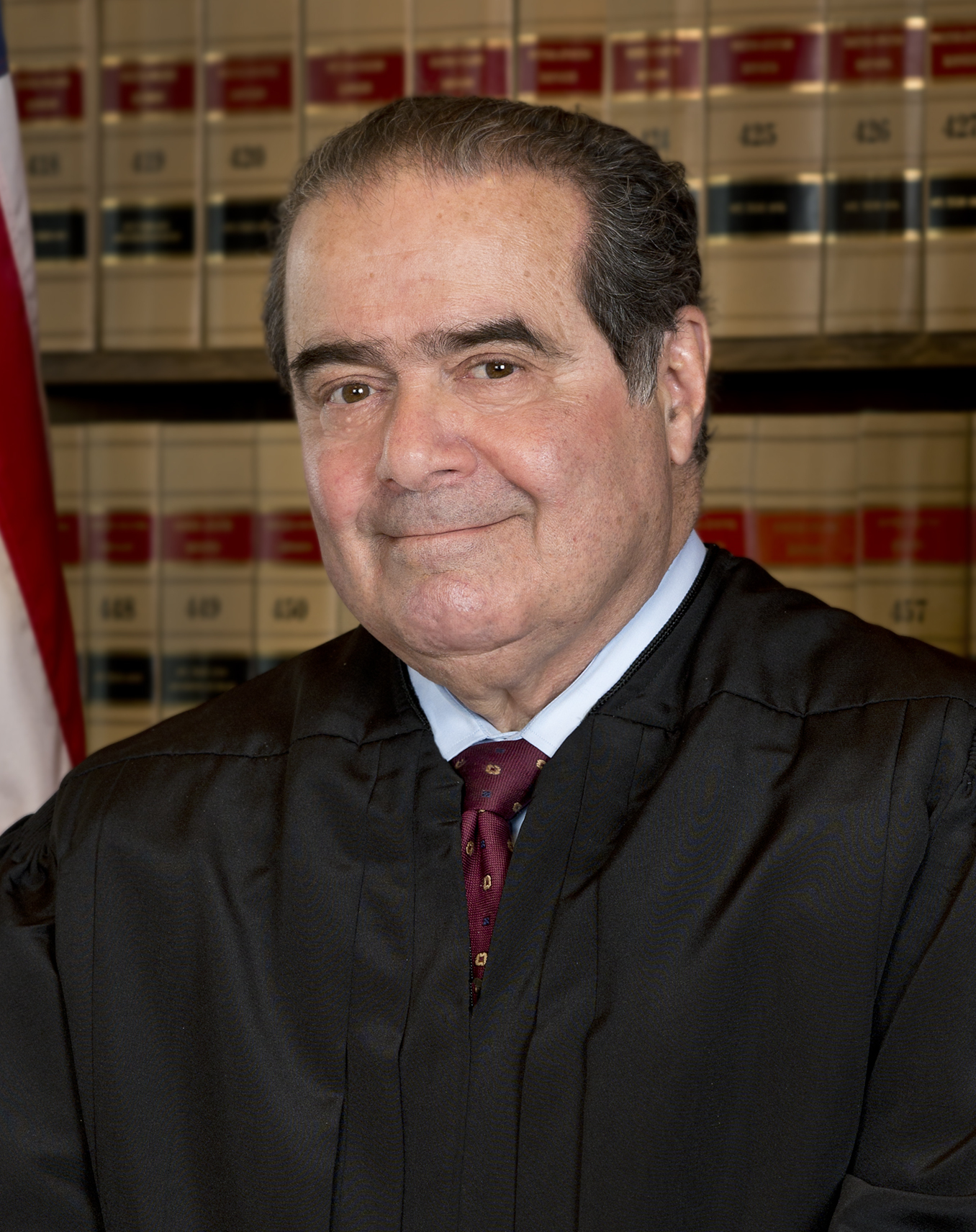

Antonin Scalia 2013 term statistics

8	Majority or plurality	10	Concurrence	0	Other
6	Dissent	1	Concurrence/dissent	Total =	25
Bench opinions = 23		Opinions relating to orders = 2		In-chambers opinions = 0
Unanimous opinions: 3		Most joined by: Thomas (19 in full, 1 in part)		Least joined by: Sotomayor (4 in full, 2 in part)

Type	Case	Citation	Issues	Joined by	Other opinions
	Planned Parenthood of Greater Tex. Surgical Health Services v. Abbott	571 U.S. ___ (2013)		Thomas, Alito	Breyer
Scalia concurred in the Court's denial of an application to vacate a stay.
	United States v. Woods	571 U.S. ___ (2013)	partnership taxation • economic substance • Tax Equity and Fiscal Responsibility Act of 1982 • valuation-misstatement penalty	Unanimous	
	Burrage v. United States	571 U.S. ___ (2014)	Controlled Substances Act • sentence enhancement • causation of drug-related death	Roberts, Kennedy, Thomas, Breyer, Kagan; Alito (in part)	Ginsburg
	Sandifer v. United States Steel Corp.	571 U.S. ___ (2014)	Fair Labor Standards Act of 1938 • compensibility of employee time spent donning protective gear • scope of collective bargaining	Roberts, Kennedy, Thomas, Ginsburg, Breyer, Alito, Kagan; Sotomayor (in part)	
	Air Wisconsin Airlines Corp. v. Hoeper	571 U.S. ___ (2014)	Aviation and Transportation Security Act • immunity to liability for defamation claims • material falsity standard	Thomas, Kagan	Sotomayor
	Fernandez v. California	571 U.S. ___ (2014)	Fourth Amendment • warrantless searches • consent of co-occupant to search		Alito; Thomas; Ginsburg
	Law v. Siegel	571 U.S. ___ (2014)	bankruptcy • Chapter 7 • homestead exemption • bankruptcy court sanctions for debtor misconduct	Unanimous	
	Lawson v. FMR LLC	571 U.S. ___ (2014)	Sarbanes-Oxley Act of 2002 • whistleblower protection for subcontractor employees • legislative intent	Thomas	Ginsburg; Sotomayor
	Lexmark Int'l, Inc. v. Static Control Components, Inc.	572 U.S. ___ (2014)	Lanham Act • false advertising • zone of interests	Unanimous	
	United States v. Castleman	572 U.S. ___ (2014)	possession of firearms by those convicted of misdemeanor crimes of domestic violence		Sotomayor; Alito
	Schuette v. BAMN	572 U.S. ___ (2014)	Michigan Civil Rights Initiative • Fourteenth Amendment • Equal Protection Clause • racial preferences in college admission	Thomas	Kennedy; Roberts; Breyer; Sotomayor
	Prado Navarette v. California	572 U.S. ___ (2014)	Fourth Amendment • reasonable suspicion • traffic stop • anonymous report of criminal activity	Ginsburg, Sotomayor, Kagan	Thomas
	White v. Woodall	572 U.S. ___ (2014)	Fifth Amendment • privilege against self-incrimination • adverse inference from defendant's failure to testify • limitations on habeas corpus • unreasonable application of clearly established federal law	Roberts, Kennedy, Thomas, Alito, Kagan	Breyer
	EPA v. EME Homer City Generation, L. P.	572 U.S. ___ (2014)	Clean Air Act • national ambient air quality standards • Good Neighbor Provision • Cross-State Air Pollution Rule	Thomas	Ginsburg
	Michigan v. Bay Mills Indian Community	572 U.S. ___ (2014)	Indian Gaming Regulatory Act • tribal sovereign immunity		Kagan; Sotomayor; Thomas; Ginsburg
	Bond v. United States	572 U.S. ___ (2014)	Chemical Weapons Convention Implementation Act of 1998	Thomas; Alito (in part)	Roberts; Thomas; Alito
	CTS Corp. v. Waldburger	573 U.S. ___ (2014)	statutory construction of federal preemption provisions	Roberts, Thomas, Alito	Kennedy; Ginsburg
	Republic of Argentina v. NML Capital, Ltd.	573 U.S. ___ (2014)	Foreign Sovereign Immunities Act • postjudgment discovery of judgment debtor's extraterritorial assets	Roberts, Kennedy, Thomas, Breyer, Alito, Kagan	Ginsburg
	Abramski v. United States	573 U.S. ___ (2014)	Gun Control Act of 1968 • failure to disclose purchase of firearm is on behalf of third party • material misrepresentation	Roberts, Thomas, Alito	Kagan
	Elmbrook School Dist. v. Doe	573 U.S. ___ (2014)	First Amendment • Establishment Clause • use of church as public school graduation venue		
	Utility Air Regulatory Group v. EPA	573 U.S. ___ (2014)	Clean Air Act • regulation of greenhouse gases • Prevention of Significant Deterioration permits for stationary pollution emitters	Roberts, Kennedy; Thomas, Ginsburg, Breyer, Alito, Sotomayor, Kagan (in part)	Breyer; Alito
	Loughrin v. United States	573 U.S. ___ (2014)	federal bank fraud • intent to defraud a financial institution	Thomas	Kagan; Alito
	American Broadcasting Cos. v. Aereo, Inc.	573 U.S. ___ (2014)	copyright law • digital redistribution of broadcast television • right to publicly perform copyrighted works	Thomas, Alito	Breyer
	McCullen v. Coakley	573 U.S. ___ (2014)	buffer zone around abortion clinics • First Amendment • free speech • public forum doctrine • content neutrality	Kennedy, Thomas	Roberts; Alito
	NLRB v. Noel Canning	573 U.S. ___ (2014)	recess appointments	Roberts, Thomas, Alito	Breyer
