= 2013 term United States Supreme Court opinions of Sonia Sotomayor =

The 2013 term of the Supreme Court of the United States began October 7, 2013, and concluded October 5, 2014. This was the fifth term of Associate Justice Sonia Sotomayor's tenure on the Court.
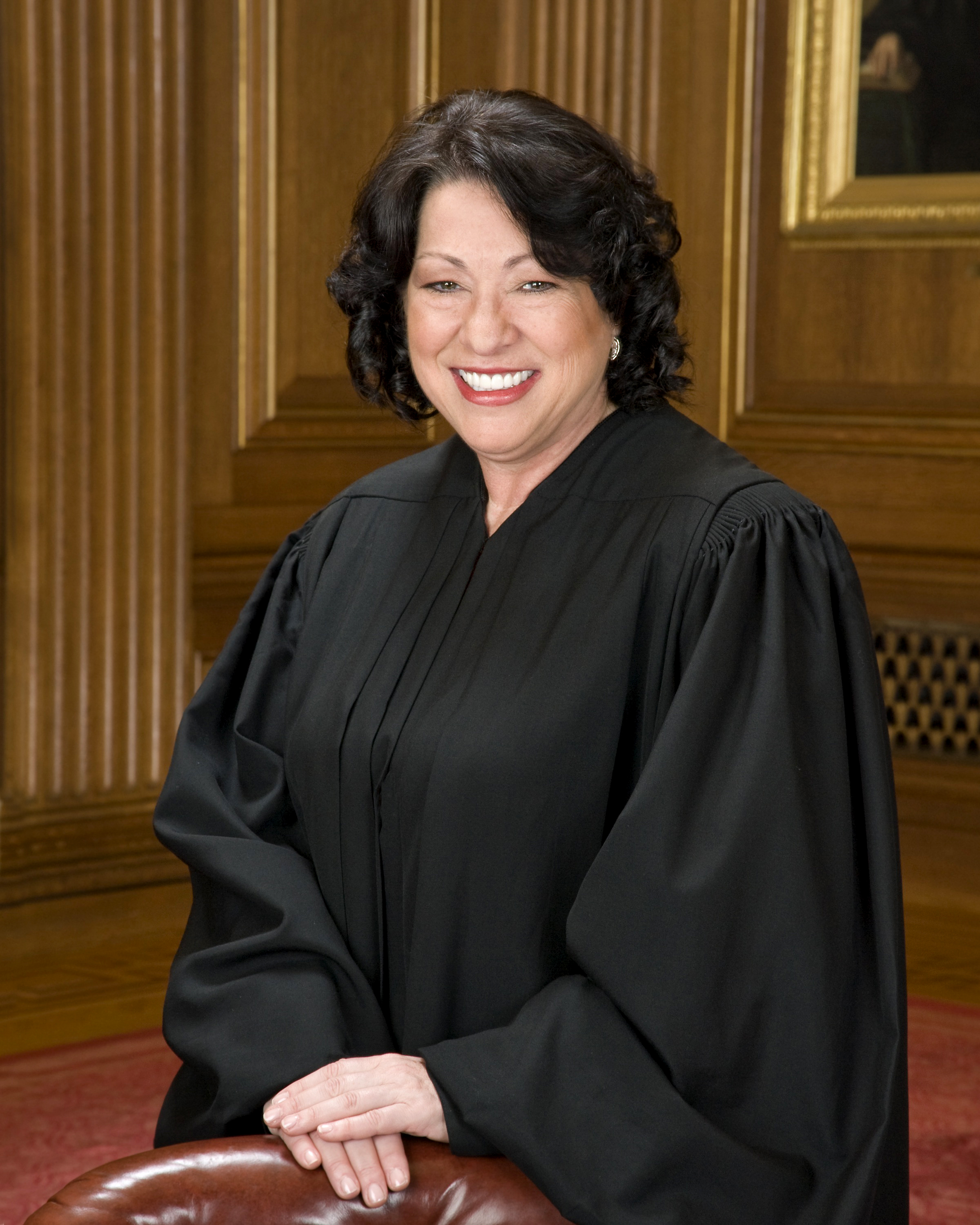

Sonia Sotomayor 2013 term statistics

| 8 | Majority or plurality | 6 | Concurrence | 0 | Other |
| 7 | Dissent | 0 | Concurrence/dissent | Total = | 21 |
| Bench opinions = 19 | | Opinions relating to orders = 2 | | In-chambers opinions = 0 |
| Unanimous opinions: 5 | | Most joined by: Ginsburg (12) | | Least joined by: Scalia (5 in full, 2 in part) |

| Type | Case | Citation | Issues | Joined by | Other opinions |
|---|---|---|---|---|---|
| | Burt v. Titlow | 571 U.S. 24 (2013) | Sixth Amendment • ineffective assistance of counsel | | Alito; Ginsburg |
| | Woodward v. Alabama | 571 U.S. 1045 (2013) | judicial override of jury sentencing determination • Sixth Amendment • right to jury trial • Eighth Amendment • death penalty | Breyer (in part) | |
Sotomayor dissented from the Court's denial of certiorari.
| | Kansas v. Cheever | 571 U.S. 87 (2013) | Fifth Amendment • privilege against self-incrimination • voluntary intoxication defense • court-ordered psychiatric evaluation | Unanimous | |
| | Daimler AG v. Bauman | 571 U.S. 142 (2013) | Fourteenth Amendment • due process • personal jurisdiction | | Ginsburg |
| | Mississippi ex rel. Hood v. AU Optronics Corp. | 571 U.S. 161 (2013) | Class Action Fairness Act of 2005 • definition of "mass action" | Unanimous | |
| | Air Wisconsin Airlines Corp. v. Hoeper | 571 U.S. 237 (2014) | Aviation and Transportation Security Act • immunity to liability for defamation claims • material falsity standard | Roberts, Kennedy, Ginsburg, Breyer, Alito; Scalia, Thomas, Kagan (in part) | Scalia |
| | Lawson v. FMR LLC | 571 U.S. 461 (2014) | Sarbanes-Oxley Act of 2002 • whistleblower protection for subcontractor employees | Kennedy, Alito | Ginsburg; Scalia |
| | BG Group plc v. Republic of Argentina | 572 U.S. 45 (2014) | consent to arbitration by treaty • Federal Arbitration Act | | Breyer; Roberts |
| | Marvin M. Brandt Revocable Trust v. United States | 572 U.S. 111 (2014) | General Railroad Right-of-Way Act of 1875 • abandonment of right-of-way • extinguishment of easement | | Roberts |
| | United States v. Castleman | 572 U.S. 157 (2014) | possession of firearms by those convicted of misdemeanor crimes of domestic violence | Roberts, Kennedy, Ginsburg, Breyer, Kagan | Scalia; Alito |
| | Schuette v. BAMN | 572 U.S. 337 (2014) | Michigan Civil Rights Initiative • Fourteenth Amendment • Equal Protection Clause • racial preferences in college admission | Ginsburg | Kennedy; Roberts; Scalia; Breyer |
| | Paroline v. United States | 572 U.S. 472 (2014) | Violence Against Women Act of 1994 • restitution for possession of child pornography • causation of victim's losses | | Kennedy; Roberts |
| | Octane Fitness, LLC v. ICON Health & Fitness, Inc. | 572 U.S. 545 (2014) | Patent Act • fee shifting provision • meaning of "exceptional cases" | Roberts, Kennedy, Thomas, Ginsburg, Breyer, Alito, Kagan; Scalia (in part) | |
| | Highmark Inc. v. Allcare Health Management System, Inc. | 572 U.S. 559 (2014) | Patent Act • fee shifting provision • standard of review of fee award | Unanimous | |
| | Robers v. United States | 572 U.S. 647 (2014) | Mandatory Victims Restitution Act of 1996 | Ginsburg | Breyer |
| | Michigan v. Bay Mills Indian Community | 572 U.S. 804 (2014) | Indian Gaming Regulatory Act • tribal sovereign immunity | | Kagan; Scalia; Thomas; Ginsburg |
| | Scialabba v. Cuellar de Osorio | 573 U.S. 81 (2014) | Immigration and Nationality Act • priority date for visa eligibility • Child Status Protection Act | Breyer; Thomas (in part) | Kagan; Roberts; Alito |
| | Clark v. Rameker | 573 U.S. 122 (2014) | exemption of retirement funds from Chapter 7 bankruptcy estates • individual retirement accounts | Unanimous | |
| | Alice Corp. v. CLS Bank Int'l | 573 U.S. 227 (2014) | patent law • ineligibility of claims directed to an abstract idea | Ginsburg, Breyer | Thomas |
| | Lane v. Franks | 573 U.S. 228 (2014) | First Amendment • free speech • speech by government employees • retaliation for sworn testimony given outside scope of employment | Unanimous | Thomas |
| | Wheaton College v. Burwell | 573 U.S. 959 (2014) | Patient Protection and Affordable Care Act • contraceptive mandate • Religious Freedom Restoration Act | Ginsburg, Kagan | |
Sotomayor dissented from the Court's order granting an injunction.
