= 2013 term United States Supreme Court opinions of John Roberts =

The 2013 term of the Supreme Court of the United States began October 7, 2013, and concluded October 5, 2014. This was the ninth term of Chief Justice John Roberts's tenure on the Court.
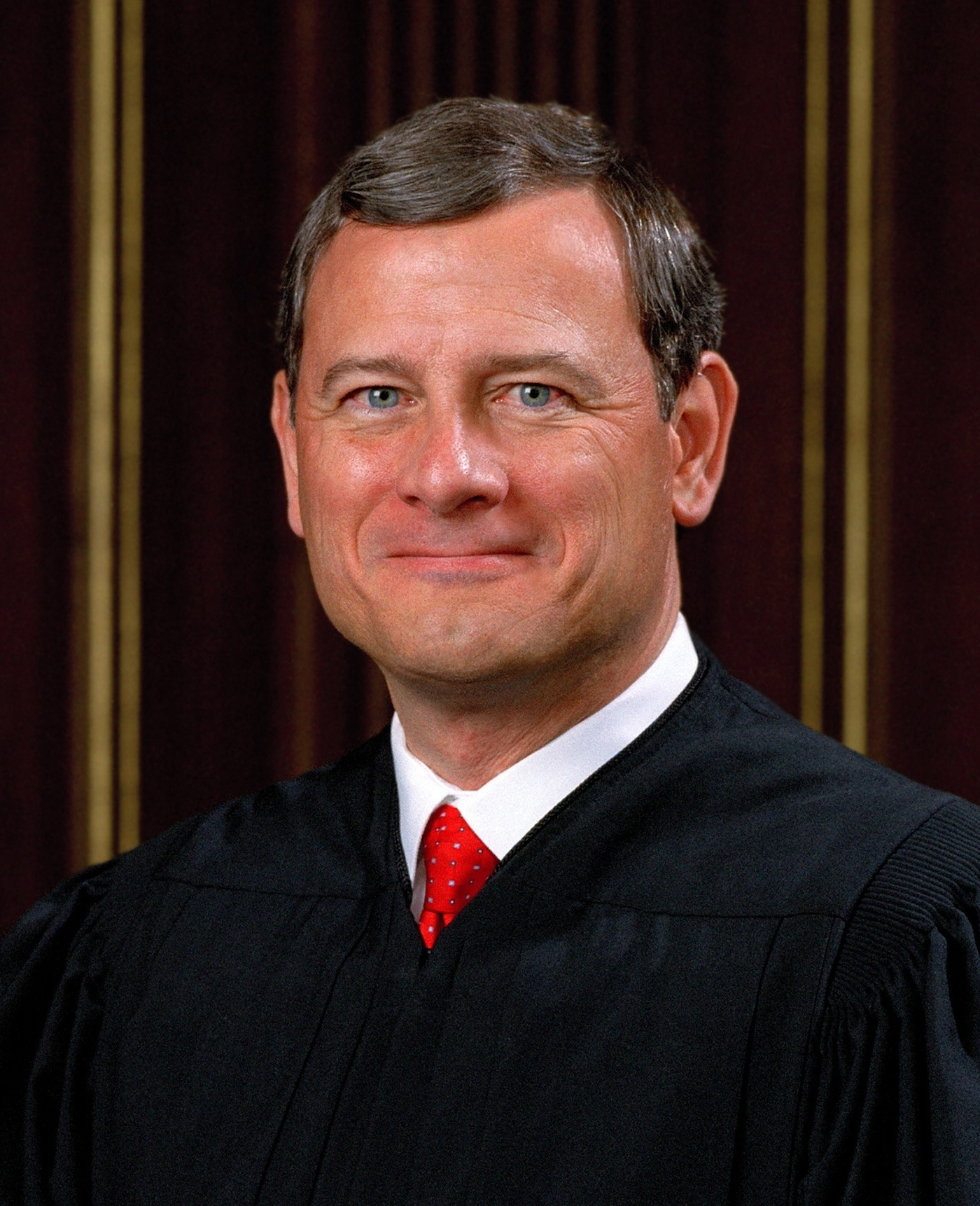

John Roberts 2013 term statistics

7	Majority or plurality	2	Concurrence	2	Other
3	Dissent	0	Concurrence/dissent	Total =	14
Bench opinions = 12		Opinions relating to orders = 1		In-chambers opinions = 1
Unanimous opinions: 1		Most joined by: Kennedy, Breyer (7)		Least joined by: Alito (3)

Type	Case	Citation	Issues	Joined by	Other opinions
	Marek v. Lane	571 U.S. ___ (2013)	cy pres • class action settlement		
Roberts filed a statement respecting the Court's denial of certiorari, regarding the settlement of class action claims that Facebook's use of Beacon to track and share off-site online activities violated the class members' privacy.
	Kaley v. United States	571 U.S. ___ (2014)	criminal forfeiture • pretrial asset restraint • grand jury determination of probable cause • Fifth Amendment • Due Process Clause • Sixth Amendment • right to counsel	Breyer, Sotomayor	Kagan
	United States v. Apel	571 U.S. ___ (2014)	criminal trespass at military installation • public easement	Unanimous	Ginsburg; Alito
	BG Group plc v. Republic of Argentina	572 U.S. ___ (2014)	consent to arbitration by treaty • Federal Arbitration Act	Kennedy	Breyer; Sotomayor
	Marvin M. Brandt Revocable Trust v. United States	572 U.S. ___ (2014)	General Railroad Right-of-Way Act of 1875 • abandonment of right-of-way • extinguishment of easement	Scalia, Kennedy, Thomas, Ginsburg, Breyer, Alito, Kagan	Sotomayor
	McCutcheon v. Federal Election Commission	572 U.S. ___ (2014)	First Amendment • campaign finance reform • Federal Election Campaign Act of 1971 • Bipartisan Campaign Reform Act of 2002 • aggregate campaign contribution limits	Scalia, Kennedy, Alito	Thomas; Breyer
	Teva Pharmaceuticals USA, Inc. v. Sandoz, Inc.	572 U.S. ___ (2014)			
Roberts denied the application to recall and stay the lower court's mandate, finding that likelihood of irreparable harm was not shown.
	Schuette v. BAMN	572 U.S. ___ (2014)	Michigan Civil Rights Initiative • Fourteenth Amendment • Equal Protection Clause • racial preferences in college admission		Kennedy; Scalia; Breyer; Sotomayor
	Paroline v. United States	572 U.S. ___ (2014)	Violence Against Women Act of 1994 • restitution for possession of child pornography • causation of victim's losses	Scalia, Thomas	Kennedy; Sotomayor
	Bond v. United States	572 U.S. ___ (2014)	Chemical Weapons Convention Implementation Act of 1998	Kennedy, Ginsburg, Breyer, Sotomayor, Kagan	Scalia; Thomas; Alito
	Scialabba v. Cuellar de Osorio	573 U.S. ___ (2014)	Immigration and Nationality Act • priority date for visa eligibility • Child Status Protection Act	Scalia	Kagan; Alito; Sotomayor
	Halliburton Co. v. Erica P. John Fund, Inc.	573 U.S. ___ (2014)	Securities Exchange Act of 1934 • SEC Rule 10b-5 • rebuttable presumption of reliance on material misrepresentation • class certification	Kennedy, Ginsburg, Breyer, Sotomayor, Kagan	Ginsburg; Thomas
	Riley v. California	573 U.S. ___ (2014)	Fourth Amendment • warrantless search of cell phone data incident to arrest	Scalia, Kennedy, Thomas, Ginsburg, Breyer, Sotomayor, Kagan	Alito
	McCullen v. Coakley	573 U.S. ___ (2014)	buffer zone around abortion clinics • First Amendment • free speech • public forum doctrine • content neutrality	Ginsburg, Breyer, Sotomayor, Kagan	Scalia; Alito
