= 2013 term United States Supreme Court opinions of Ruth Bader Ginsburg =

The 2013 term of the Supreme Court of the United States began October 7, 2013, and concluded October 5, 2014. This was the twenty-first term of Associate Justice Ruth Bader Ginsburg's tenure on the Court.
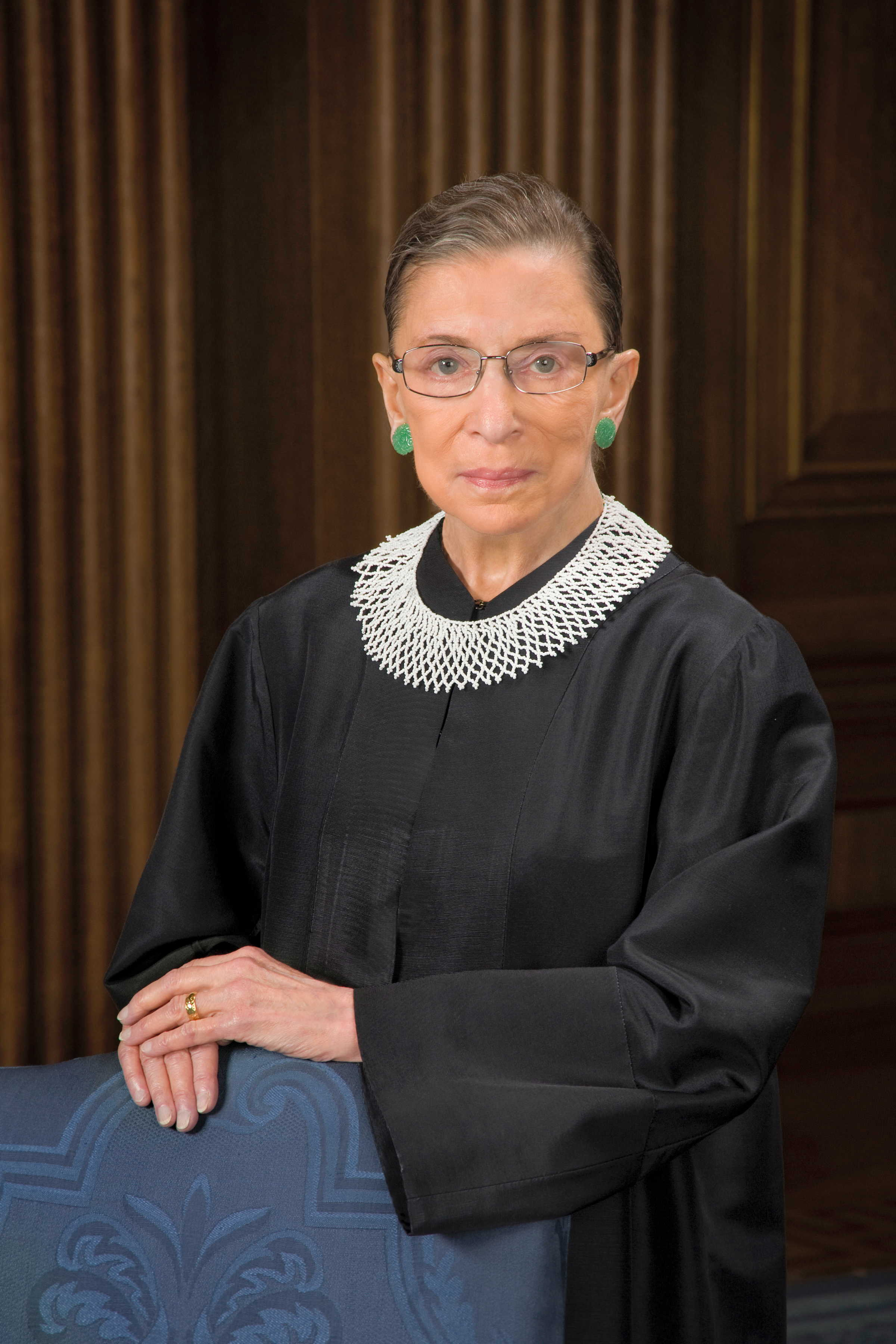

Ruth Bader Ginsburg 2013 term statistics

7	Majority or plurality	4	Concurrence	0	Other
5	Dissent	0	Concurrence/dissent	Total =	16
Bench opinions = 16		Opinions relating to orders = 0		In-chambers opinions = 0
Unanimous opinions: 3		Most joined by: Sotomayor (10)		Least joined by: Kennedy, Alito (5)

Type	Case	Citation	Issues	Joined by	Other opinions
	Burt v. Titlow	571 U.S. 25 (2013)	Sixth Amendment • ineffective assistance of counsel		Alito; Sotomayor
	Sprint Communications, Inc. v. Jacobs	571 U.S. 69 (2013)	Younger abstention	Unanimous	
	Daimler AG v. Bauman	571 U.S. 117 (2013)	Fourteenth Amendment • due process • personal jurisdiction	Roberts, Scalia, Kennedy, Thomas, Breyer, Alito, Kagan	Sotomayor
	Burrage v. United States	571 U.S. 219 (2014)	Controlled Substances Act • sentence enhancement • causation of drug-related death	Sotomayor	Scalia
	Fernandez v. California	571 U.S. 310 (2014)	Fourth Amendment • warrantless searches • consent of co-occupant to search	Sotomayor, Kagan	Alito; Scalia; Thomas
	United States v. Apel	571 U.S. 375 (2014)	criminal trespass at military installation • public easement • First Amendment • free speech • public forum doctrine	Sotomayor	Roberts; Alito
	Lawson v. FMR LLC	571 U.S. 429 (2014)	Sarbanes-Oxley Act of 2002 • whistleblower protection for subcontractor employees	Roberts, Breyer, Kagan; Scalia, Thomas (in part)	Scalia; Sotomayor
	EPA v. EME Homer City Generation, L. P.	572 U.S. 489 (2014)	Clean Air Act • national ambient air quality standards • Good Neighbor Provision • Cross-State Air Pollution Rule	Roberts, Kennedy, Breyer, Sotomayor, Kagan	Scalia
	Petrella v. Metro-Goldwyn-Mayer, Inc.	572 U.S. 663 (2014)	copyright • statute of limitations • laches	Scalia, Thomas, Alito, Sotomayor, Kagan	Breyer
	Wood v. Moss	572 U.S. 744 (2014)	First Amendment • viewpoint discrimination • Secret Service crowd control • qualified immunity	Unanimous	
	Michigan v. Bay Mills Indian Community	572 U.S. 831 (2014)	Indian Gaming Regulatory Act • tribal sovereign immunity		Kagan; Sotomayor; Scalia; Thomas
	Nautilus, Inc. v. Biosig Instruments, Inc.	572 U.S. 898 (2014)	patent law • definiteness requirement	Unanimous	
	CTS Corp. v. Waldburger	573 U.S. 20 (2014)	Comprehensive Environmental Response, Compensation, and Liability Act of 1980 • federal preemption of state statutes of limitations • statute of repose	Breyer	Kennedy; Scalia
	Republic of Argentina v. NML Capital, Ltd.	573 U.S. 147 (2014)	Foreign Sovereign Immunities Act • postjudgment discovery of judgment debtor's extraterritorial assets		Scalia
	Halliburton Co. v. Erica P. John Fund, Inc.	573 U.S. 284 (2014)	Securities Exchange Act of 1934 • SEC Rule 10b-5 • rebuttable presumption of reliance on material misrepresentation • class certification	Breyer, Sotomayor	Roberts; Thomas
	Burwell v. Hobby Lobby Stores, Inc.	573 U.S. 739 (2014)	Religious Freedom Restoration Act • Affordable Care Act • contraceptive mandate • religious-based objection by for-profit corporation	Sotomayor; Breyer, Kagan (in part)	Alito; Kennedy; Breyer and Kagan
