= 2013 term United States Supreme Court opinions of Clarence Thomas =

The 2013 term of the Supreme Court of the United States began October 7, 2013, and concluded October 5, 2014. This was the twenty-third term of Associate Justice Clarence Thomas's tenure on the Court.
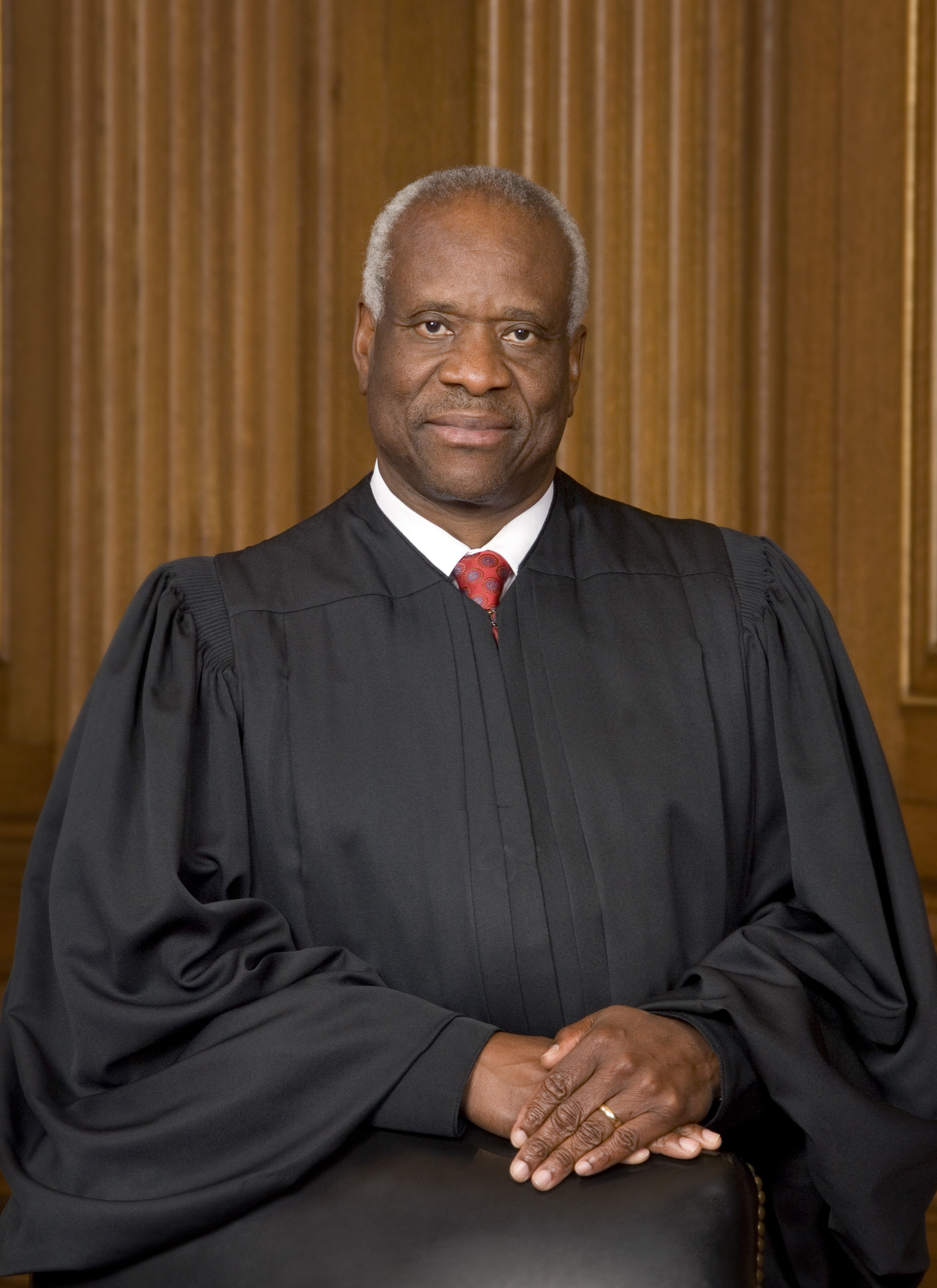

Clarence Thomas 2013 term statistics

7	Majority or plurality	7	Concurrence	0	Other
1	Dissent	0	Concurrence/dissent	Total =	15
Bench opinions = 15		Opinions relating to orders = 0		In-chambers opinions = 0
Unanimous opinions: 6		Most joined by: Scalia, Alito (9 in full, 1 in part)		Least joined by: Sotomayor, Kagan (6)

Type	Case	Citation	Issues	Joined by	Other opinions
	Heimeshoff v. Hartford Life & Accident Ins. Co.	571 U.S. ___ (2013)	ERISA • contractual limitations periods	Unanimous	
	Walden v. Fiore	571 U.S. ___ (2014)	Fourteenth Amendment • Due Process Clause • personal jurisdiction • minimum contacts	Unanimous	
	Fernandez v. California	571 U.S. ___ (2014)	Fourth Amendment • warrantless searches • consent of co-occupant to search		Alito; Scalia; Ginsburg
	Chadbourne & Parke LLP v. Troice	571 U.S. ___ (2014)	Securities Litigation Uniform Standards Act of 1998 • preclusion of state-law class actions • connection between misrepresentation and sale of security		Breyer; Kennedy
	Lozano v. Montoya Alvarez	572 U.S. ___ (2014)	Hague Convention on the Civil Aspects of International Child Abduction • equitable tolling	Unanimous	Alito
	McCutcheon v. Federal Election Commission	572 U.S. ___ (2014)	First Amendment • campaign finance reform • Federal Election Campaign Act of 1971 • Bipartisan Campaign Reform Act of 2002 • aggregate campaign contribution limits		Roberts; Breyer
	Prado Navarette v. California	572 U.S. ___ (2014)	Fourth Amendment • reasonable suspicion • traffic stop • anonymous report of criminal activity	Roberts, Kennedy, Breyer, Alito	Scalia
	Town of Greece v. Galloway	572 U.S. ___ (2014)	First Amendment • Establishment Clause • legislative prayer	Scalia (in part)	Kennedy; Alito; Breyer; Kagan
	Michigan v. Bay Mills Indian Community	572 U.S. ___ (2014)	Indian Gaming Regulatory Act • tribal sovereign immunity	Scalia, Ginsburg, Alito	Kagan; Sotomayor; Scalia; Ginsburg
	Bond v. United States	572 U.S. ___ (2014)	Chemical Weapons Convention Implementation Act of 1998	Scalia; Alito (in part)	Roberts; Scalia; Alito
	Executive Benefits Ins. Agency v. Arkison	573 U.S. ___ (2014)	Bankruptcy Amendments and Federal Judgeship Act of 1984 • bankruptcy court authority to adjudicate claims	Unanimous	
	Susan B. Anthony List v. Driehaus	573 U.S. ___ (2014)	Article Three standing • First Amendment • free speech • criminal penalty for false statements during political campaign	Unanimous	
	Alice Corp. v. CLS Bank Int'l	573 U.S. ___ (2014)	patent law • ineligibility of claims directed to an abstract idea	Unanimous	Sotomayor
	Lane v. Franks	573 U.S. ___ (2014)	First Amendment • free speech • speech by government employees • retaliation for sworn testimony given outside scope of employment	Scalia, Alito	Sotomayor
	Halliburton Co. v. Erica P. John Fund, Inc.	573 U.S. ___ (2014)	Securities Exchange Act of 1934 • SEC Rule 10b-5 • rebuttable presumption of reliance on material misrepresentation • class certification	Scalia, Alito	Roberts; Ginsburg
