= 2013 term United States Supreme Court opinions of Elena Kagan =

The 2013 term of the Supreme Court of the United States began October 7, 2013, and concluded October 5, 2014. This was the fourth term of Associate Justice Elena Kagan's tenure on the Court.
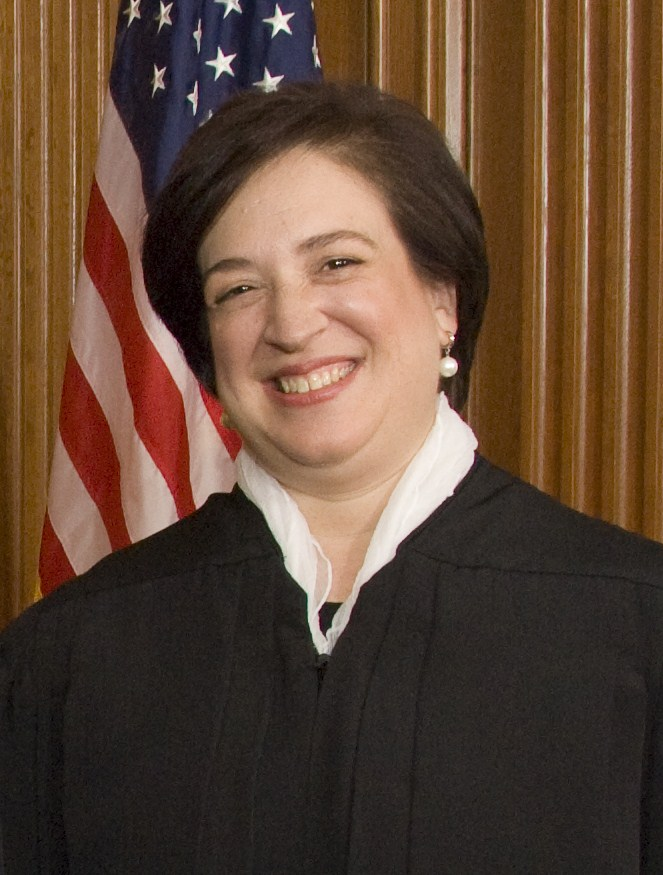

Elena Kagan 2013 term statistics

7	Majority or plurality	0	Concurrence	0	Other
3	Dissent	0	Concurrence/dissent	Total =	10
Bench opinions = 10		Opinions relating to orders = 0		In-chambers opinions = 0
Unanimous opinions: 1		Most joined by: Breyer, Sotomayor (7)		Least joined by: Alito (2)

Type	Case	Citation	Issues	Joined by	Other opinions
	Kaley v. United States	571 U.S. 320 (2014)	criminal forfeiture • pretrial asset restraint • grand jury determination of probable cause • Fifth Amendment • Due Process Clause • Sixth Amendment • right to counsel	Scalia, Kennedy, Thomas, Ginsburg, Alito	Roberts
	Rosemond v. United States	572 U.S. 65 (2014)	aiding and abetting use of gun in drug trafficking crime • advance knowledge of confederate's gun use	Roberts, Kennedy, Ginsburg, Breyer, Sotomayor; Scalia (in part)	Alito
	Town of Greece v. Galloway	572 U.S. 615 (2014)	First Amendment • Establishment Clause • legislative prayer	Ginsburg, Breyer, Sotomayor	Kennedy; Thomas; Alito; Breyer
	Michigan v. Bay Mills Indian Community	572 U.S. 782 (2014)	Indian Gaming Regulatory Act • tribal sovereign immunity	Roberts, Kennedy, Breyer, Sotomayor	Sotomayor; Scalia; Thomas; Ginsburg
	Scialabba v. Cuellar de Osorio	573 U.S. 41 (2014)	Immigration and Nationality Act • priority date for visa eligibility • Child Status Protection Act	Kennedy, Ginsburg	Roberts; Alito; Sotomayor
	Abramski v. United States	573 U.S. 169 (2014)	Gun Control Act of 1968 • failure to disclose purchase of firearm is on behalf of third party • material misrepresentation	Kennedy, Ginsburg, Breyer, Sotomayor	Scalia
	United States v. Clarke	573 U.S. 253 (2014)	IRS summons • taxpayer right to examine IRS officials acting in bad faith	Unanimous	
	Loughrin v. United States	573 U.S. 351 (2014)	federal bank fraud • intent to defraud a financial institution	Roberts, Kennedy, Ginsburg, Breyer, Sotomayor; Scalia, Thomas (in part)	Scalia; Alito
	Harris v. Quinn	573 U.S. 657 (2014)	imposition of labor union fees on non-member public employees • First Amendment • speech by government employees	Ginsburg, Breyer, Sotomayor	Alito
	Burwell v. Hobby Lobby Stores, Inc.	573 U.S. 772 (2014)	Religious Freedom Restoration Act • Affordable Care Act • contraceptive mandate • religious-based objection by for-profit corporation		Alito; Kennedy; Ginsburg
Signed jointly with Breyer.
