= 2013 term United States Supreme Court opinions of Stephen Breyer =

The 2013 term of the Supreme Court of the United States began October 7, 2013, and concluded October 5, 2014. This was the twentieth term of Associate Justice Stephen Breyer's tenure on the Court.
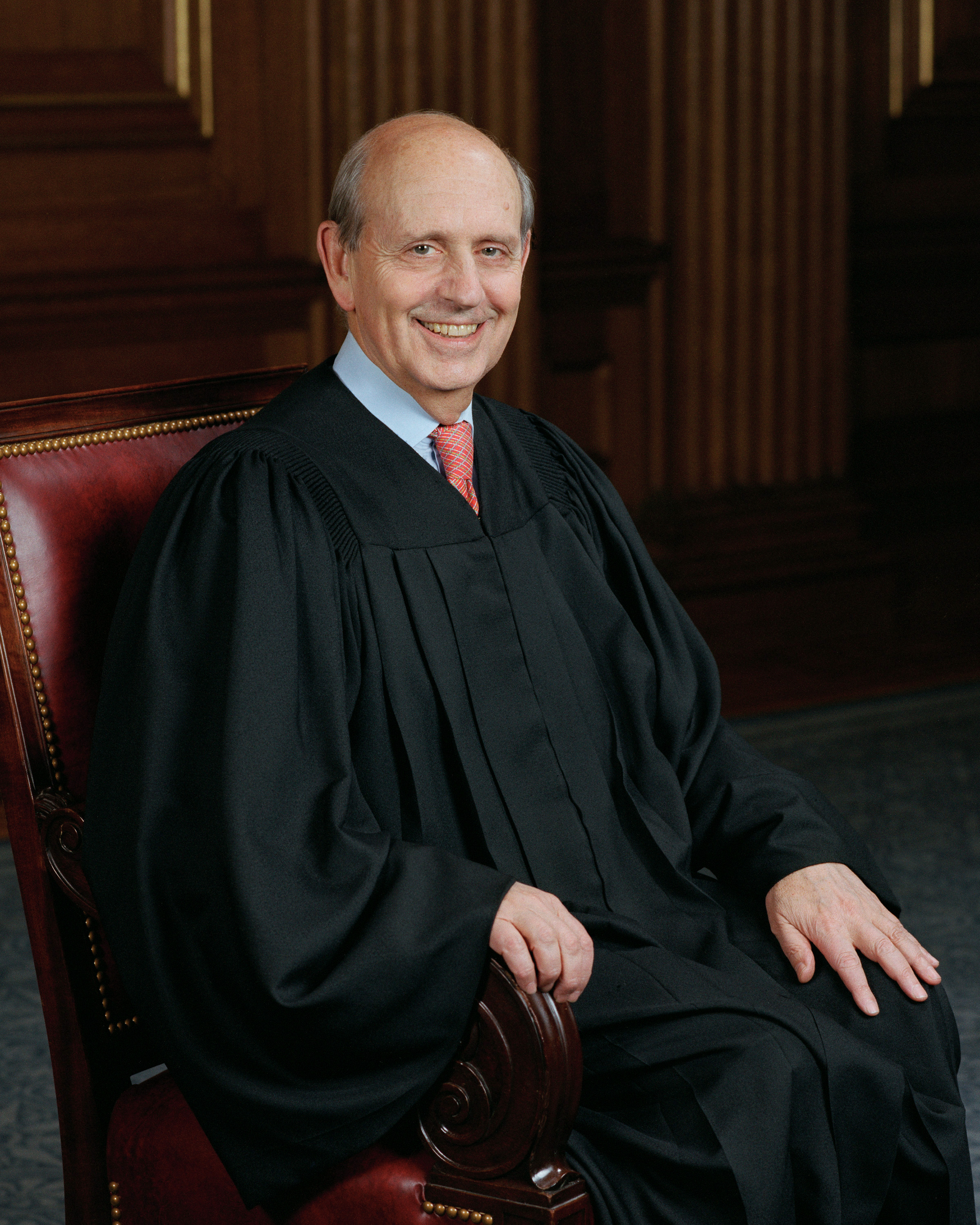

Stephen Breyer 2013 term statistics

7	Majority or plurality	1	Concurrence	1	Other
7	Dissent	1	Concurrence/dissent	Total =	17
Bench opinions = 15		Opinions relating to orders = 2		In-chambers opinions = 0
Unanimous opinions: 3		Most joined by: Sotomayor (11 in full, 1 in part)		Least joined by: Alito (4)

Type	Case	Citation	Issues	Joined by	Other opinions
	Planned Parenthood of Greater Tex. Surgical Health Services v. Abbott	571 U.S. ___ (2013)	restrictions on abortion providers • physician admitting privileges requirement	Ginsburg, Sotomayor, Kagan	Scalia
Breyer dissented from the Court's denial of an application to vacate a stay.
	Unite Here Local 355 v. Mulhall	571 U.S. ___ (2013)	Labor Management Relations Act of 1947	Sotomayor, Kagan	per curiam
Breyer dissented from the Court's dismissal of certiorari as improvidently granted.
	Medtronic, Inc. v. Mirowski Family Ventures, LLC	571 U.S. ___ (2014)	patent law • Declaratory Judgment Act • subject-matter jurisdiction • burden of proof	Unanimous	
	Chadbourne & Parke LLP v. Troice	571 U.S. ___ (2014)	Securities Litigation Uniform Standards Act of 1998 • preclusion of state-law class actions • connection between misrepresentation and sale of security	Roberts, Scalia, Thomas, Ginsburg, Sotomayor, Kagan	Thomas; Kennedy
	BG Group plc v. Republic of Argentina	572 U.S. ___ (2014)	consent to arbitration by treaty • Federal Arbitration Act	Scalia, Thomas, Ginsburg, Alito, Kagan; Sotomayor (in part)	Sotomayor; Roberts
	McCutcheon v. Federal Election Commission	572 U.S. ___ (2014)	First Amendment • campaign finance reform • Federal Election Campaign Act of 1971 • Bipartisan Campaign Reform Act of 2002 • aggregate campaign contribution limits	Ginsburg, Sotomayor, Kagan	Roberts; Thomas
	Hussain v. Obama	572 U.S. ___ (2014)	Authorization for Use of Military Force • detention of enemy combatants		
Breyer filed a statement respecting the Court's denial of certiorari.
	Schuette v. BAMN	572 U.S. ___ (2014)	Michigan Civil Rights Initiative • Fourteenth Amendment • Equal Protection Clause • racial preferences in college admission		Kennedy; Roberts; Scalia; Sotomayor
	White v. Woodall	572 U.S. ___ (2014)	Fifth Amendment • privilege against self-incrimination • adverse inference from defendant's failure to testify • limitations on habeas corpus • unreasonable application of clearly established federal law	Ginsburg, Sotomayor	Scalia
	Town of Greece v. Galloway	572 U.S. ___ (2014)	First Amendment • Establishment Clause • legislative prayer		Kennedy; Thomas; Alito; Kagan
	Robers v. United States	572 U.S. ___ (2014)	Mandatory Victims Restitution Act of 1996	Unanimous	Sotomayor
	Petrella v. Metro-Goldwyn-Mayer, Inc.	572 U.S. ___ (2014)	copyright • statute of limitations • laches	Roberts, Kennedy	Ginsburg
	Utility Air Regulatory Group v. EPA	573 U.S. ___ (2014)	Clean Air Act • regulation of greenhouse gases • Prevention of Significant Deterioration permits for stationary pollution emitters	Ginsburg, Sotomayor, Kagan	Scalia; Alito
	Fifth Third Bancorp v. Dudenhoeffer	573 U.S. ___ (2014)	Employee Retirement Income Security Act of 1974 • breach of fiduciary duty of prudence	Unanimous	
	American Broadcasting Cos. v. Aereo, Inc.	573 U.S. ___ (2014)	copyright law • digital redistribution of broadcast television • right to publicly perform copyrighted works	Roberts, Kennedy, Ginsburg, Sotomayor, Kagan	Scalia
	NLRB v. Noel Canning	573 U.S. ___ (2014)	recess appointments	Kennedy, Ginsburg, Sotomayor, Kagan	Scalia
	Burwell v. Hobby Lobby Stores, Inc.	573 U.S. ___ (2014)	Religious Freedom Restoration Act • Affordable Care Act • contraceptive mandate • religious-based objection by for-profit corporation		Alito; Kennedy; Ginsburg
Signed jointly with Kagan.
