= Bond v. United States =

Bond v. United States may refer to two distinct cases:

- Bond v. United States (2000), a United States Supreme Court decision involving the Fourth Amendment

The next two are the same case. In 2011 the Supreme Court decided Bond had standing to bring a suit before a Federal Court. The subsequent decision of the lower court, after the suit was heard, came before the Supreme Court on appeal in 2014.

- Bond v. United States (2011), a United States Supreme Court decision involving individual standing under the Tenth Amendment
- Bond v. United States (2014), a United States Supreme Court decision involving the Chemical Weapons Convention Implementation Act of 1998
