= Waldburger =

Waldburger is a surname that occurs mainly in Switzerland. Notable people with the surname include:

- Ruth Waldburger (born 1951), Swiss film producer
- TJ Waldburger (born 1988), American retired mixed martial artist

== See also ==
- CTS Corp. v. Waldburger, a United States Supreme Court case (2014)
- Wasserburger, surname
