= 2013 term United States Supreme Court opinions of Anthony Kennedy =

The 2013 term of the Supreme Court of the United States began October 7, 2013, and concluded October 5, 2014. This was the twenty-seventh term of Associate Justice Anthony Kennedy's tenure on the Court.
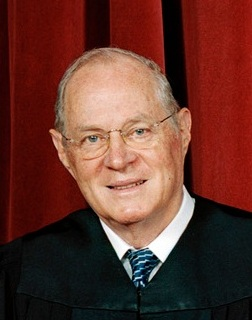

Anthony Kennedy 2013 term statistics

8	Majority or plurality	1	Concurrence	0	Other
1	Dissent	0	Concurrence/dissent	Total =	10
Bench opinions = 10		Opinions relating to orders = 0		In-chambers opinions = 0
Unanimous opinions: 1		Most joined by: Alito (7 in full, 1 in part)		Least joined by: Breyer (4)

Type	Case	Citation	Issues	Joined by	Other opinions
	Ray Haluch Gravel Co. v. Central Pension Fund of Operating Engineers and Participating Employers	571 U.S. ___ (2013)	appeal from final decision • award of attorney's fees • Federal Rules of Appellate Procedure	Unanimous	
	Chadbourne & Parke LLP v. Troice	571 U.S. ___ (2014)	Securities Litigation Uniform Standards Act of 1998 • preclusion of state-law class actions • connection between misrepresentation and sale of security	Alito	Breyer; Thomas
	United States v. Quality Stores, Inc.	572 U.S. ___ (2014)	Federal Insurance Contributions Act • taxation of severance pay	Roberts, Scalia, Thomas, Ginsburg, Breyer, Alito, Sotomayor	
	Schuette v. BAMN	572 U.S. ___ (2014)	Michigan Civil Rights Initiative • Fourteenth Amendment • Equal Protection Clause • racial preferences in college admission	Roberts, Alito	Roberts; Scalia; Breyer; Sotomayor
	Paroline v. United States	572 U.S. ___ (2014)	Violence Against Women Act of 1994 • restitution for possession of child pornography • causation of victim's losses	Ginsburg, Breyer, Alito, Kagan	Roberts; Sotomayor
	Town of Greece v. Galloway	572 U.S. ___ (2014)	First Amendment • Establishment Clause • legislative prayer	Roberts, Alito; Scalia, Thomas (in part)	Thomas; Alito; Breyer; Kagan
	Hall v. Florida	572 U.S. ___ (2014)	Eighth Amendment • capital punishment • execution of the mentally disabled	Ginsburg, Breyer, Sotomayor, Kagan	Alito
	CTS Corp. v. Waldburger	573 U.S. ___ (2014)	Comprehensive Environmental Response, Compensation, and Liability Act of 1980 • federal preemption of state statutes of limitations • statute of repose	Sotomayor, Kagan; Roberts, Scalia, Thomas, Alito (in part)	Scalia; Ginsburg
	POM Wonderful LLC v. Coca-Cola Co.	573 U.S. ___ (2014)	Lanham Act • Federal Food, Drug, and Cosmetic Act • false or misleading product descriptions	Roberts, Scalia, Thomas, Ginsburg, Alito, Sotomayor, Kagan	
	Burwell v. Hobby Lobby Stores, Inc.	573 U.S. ___ (2014)	Religious Freedom Restoration Act • Affordable Care Act • contraceptive mandate • religious-based objection by for-profit corporation		Alito; Ginsburg; Breyer and Kagan
