= Scialabba =

Scialabba is a surname. Notable people with the surname include:

- George Scialabba, American book critic
- Stephenie Scialabba, American attorney and politician

== See also ==
- Scialabba v. Cuellar de Osorio, a United States Supreme Court case
