= Wasserburger =

Wasserburger is a surname. Notable people with the surname include:

- Jacob Wasserburger (fl. from 2025), American politician from Wyoming
- Jeff Wasserburger (born 1961), American politician from Wyoming

== See also ==
- Waldburger
