= Bond v. United States (2011) =

- Supreme Court of the United States

Argued February 22, 2011 Decided June 16, 2011
- Full case name: Carol Anne Bond, Petitioner v. United States
- Docket no.: 09-1227
- Citations: 564 U.S. 211 (more) 131 S. Ct. 2355; 180 L. Ed. 2d 269; 2011 U.S. LEXIS 4558

Case history
- Prior: Defendant convicted, 07-cr-528 (E.D. Pa.).; Affirmed, 581 F.3d 128 (3d Cir. 2009).; Cert. granted, 562 U.S. 960 (2010).
- Subsequent: Affirmed on remand, 681 F.3d 149 (3d Cir. 2012).; Cert. granted, 568 U.S. 1140 (2013).; Reversed, 572 U.S. 844 (2014).

Questions presented
- Whether a criminal defendant convicted under a federal statute has standing to challenge her conviction on grounds that, as applied to her, the statute is beyond the federal government's enumerated powers and inconsistent with the Tenth Amendment.

Holding
- Bond has standing to challenge the federal statute on grounds that the measure interferes with the powers reserved to States.

Court membership
- Chief Justice John Roberts Associate Justices Antonin Scalia · Anthony Kennedy; Clarence Thomas · Ruth Bader Ginsburg; Stephen Breyer · Samuel Alito; Sonia Sotomayor · Elena Kagan

Case opinions
- Majority: Kennedy, joined by unanimous
- Concurrence: Ginsburg, joined by Breyer

Laws applied
- U.S. Const. amend. X

Bond v. United States, 564 U.S. 211 (2011), a case before the Supreme Court of the United States in which the court held that people, just like states, may have standing to raise Tenth Amendment challenges to a federal law.

The issue arose in the prosecution of an individual under the federal Chemical Weapons Convention Implementation Act after a local poisoning attempt. The defendant argued, in part, that the application of the law violated the Constitution's federalism limitations on the statutory implementation of treaties by Congress. The Court sent the individual's case back without ruling on the merits.

A second decision in 2014 (572 U.S. 844) reversed the individuals conviction because the law did not cover their conduct, so the Court never decided the treaty-power issue.

== Background ==
Carol Anne Bond of Lansdale, Pennsylvania, found out that her husband was the father of her friend Myrlinda Hayne's child. Carol Bond stole a poisonous chemical, 10–chlorophenoxarsine, from her employer (Rohm and Haas) and purchased potassium dichromate from the Internet. Bond then spread both on Hayne's door knob, car door handles, and mailbox. Haynes suffered a minor chemical burn on her thumb. Bond was indicted for mail theft and for violation of the Chemical Weapons Convention Implementation Act of 1998.

Her appeal argued that applying the chemical weapons treaty to her violated the Tenth Amendment. The Court of Appeals found Bond lacked standing to make a Tenth Amendment claim.

== Decision ==
The Supreme Court concluded unanimously that Bond had standing to argue that a federal statute enforcing the Chemical Weapons Convention as applied to her local poisoning case intruded on powers. Justice Kennedy reasoned that actions exceeding the federal government's enumerated powers undermine the sovereign interests of the states, and that federalism also protects individual liberty, not only state power. Individuals still have to meet ordinary standing requirements, but Bond did, because she was a party to a real case and was injured by her prosecution. The Court rejected the Third Circuit's view that only states can raise Tenth Amendment Claims.

The Court expressed no view on the merits of Bond's challenge to the federal statute and remanded the case to the Third Circuit Court of Appeals.

== Subsequent history ==
The Third Circuit, on remand, found that the Supreme Court's decision gave Bond standing to raise federalism questions about the federal government's power to enforce legislation that implements a treaty. However, the circuit court found the 1920 Supreme Court precedent Missouri v. Holland made the legislation indisputably valid since the treaty is valid.

The case then returned to the Supreme Court in Bond v. United States, 572 U.S. 844 (2014), in which it ruled that since the Implementation Act did not reach her conduct, the Court declined to address the constitutional issue.

== Analysis ==
The two decisions together let the Court avoid a major ruling on the treaty power. Standing in 2011 opened the door to Bond's federalism claim, and the narrow reading in 2014 let the Court decide the case without answering it. Sloss describes this as choosing the lesser of two evils: rule on limits of treaty power, or strain the statutes meaning to avoid doing so.

== See also ==
- Reid v. Covert, a 1957 decision in which the U.S. Supreme Court ruled that an executive agreement cannot override the Constitutional right to trial by jury.
