= Rosemond v. United States =

- Supreme Court of the United States

Decided March 5, 2014
- Full case name: Rosemond v. United States
- Citations: 572 U.S. 65 (more)

Holding
- Convicting someone for aiding and abetting requires the prosecution to prove conduct extending to some part of the crime and intent extending to the whole crime.

Court membership
- Chief Justice John Roberts Associate Justices Antonin Scalia · Anthony Kennedy; Clarence Thomas · Ruth Bader Ginsburg; Stephen Breyer · Samuel Alito; Sonia Sotomayor · Elena Kagan

Case opinions
- Majority: Kagan, joined by Roberts, Kennedy, Ginsburg, Breyer, Sotomayor; Scalia (not Footnotes 7 and 8)
- Concur/dissent: Alito, joined by Thomas

Rosemond v. United States, 572 U.S. 65 (2014), was a United States Supreme Court case in which the court held that convicting someone for aiding and abetting requires the prosecution to prove conduct extending to some part of the crime and intent extending to the whole crime.

== Background ==
Justus Rosemond took part in a drug deal in which either he or one of his confederates fired a gun. Because the shooter's identity was disputed, the government charged Rosemond with violating 18 U.S.C. § 924(c) by using or carrying a gun in connection with a drug trafficking crime, or, in the alternative, aiding and abetting that offense under 18 U.S.C. § 2. The trial judge instructed the jury that Rosemond was guilty of aiding and abetting, the §924(c) offense, if he (1) "knew his cohort used a firearm in the drug trafficking crime" and (2) "knowingly and actively participated in the drug trafficking crime." This deviated from Rosemond's proposed instruction that the jury must find that he acted intentionally "to facilitate or encourage" the firearm's use, as opposed to merely the predicate drug offense. Rosemond was convicted, and the Tenth Circuit Court of Appeals affirmed, rejecting his argument that the federal District Court's aiding and abetting instructions were erroneous.

== Opinion of the court ==
The Supreme Court issued an opinion on March 5, 2014. The Supreme Court reversed the lower courts.

=== Concurrences ===
Justice Samuel Alito, who was joined with Justice Clarence Thomas agreed with the first twelve pages of the court's opinion, but disagreed with points after this, one point being about how a conviction for aiding and abetting needs proof that either the aider or abettor could have had "a realistic opportunity" to stop what they were doing.
