= White v. Woodall =

- Supreme Court of the United States

Decided April 23, 2014
- Full case name: White v. Woodall
- Citations: 572 U.S. 415 (more)

Holding
- The rejection of the requested jury instruction in this case was not objectively unreasonable or contrary to clearly established law, so the defendant did not satisfy the requirements for seeking habeas relief under AEDPA.

Court membership
- Chief Justice John Roberts Associate Justices Antonin Scalia · Anthony Kennedy; Clarence Thomas · Ruth Bader Ginsburg; Stephen Breyer · Samuel Alito; Sonia Sotomayor · Elena Kagan

Case opinions
- Majority: Scalia, joined by Roberts, Kennedy, Thomas, Alito, Kagan
- Dissent: Breyer, joined by Ginsburg, Sotomayor

Laws applied
- Antiterrorism and Effective Death Penalty Act of 1996

White v. Woodall, 572 U.S. 415 (2014), was a United States Supreme Court case in which the court held that the rejection of the requested jury instruction in this case was not objectively unreasonable or contrary to clearly established law, so the defendant did not satisfy the requirements for seeking habeas relief under the Antiterrorism and Effective Death Penalty Act of 1996 (AEDPA).

== Background ==
Woodall pleaded guilty to capital murder; capital kidnapping; and first-degree rape, the statutory aggravating circumstance for the murder. He was sentenced to death after the trial court denied defense counsel's request to instruct the jury not to draw any adverse inference from respondent's decision not to testify at the penalty phase. The Kentucky Supreme Court affirmed, finding that the Fifth Amendment's requirement of a no-adverse-inference instruction to protect a non-testifying defendant at the guilt phase (Note: Articulated in Carter v. Kentucky (1981).) is not required at the penalty phase. Subsequently, the federal District Court granted Woodall habeas relief, holding that the trial court's refusal to give the requested instruction violated respondent's privilege against self-incrimination. The Sixth Circuit Court of Appeals affirmed.

== Opinion of the court ==
The Supreme Court issued an opinion on April 23, 2014. The Supreme Court reversed.
