= Lane v. Franks =

- Supreme Court of the United States

Argued April 29, 2014 Decided June 19, 2014
- Full case name: Edward Lane, Petitioner v. Steve Franks
- Docket no.: 13-483
- Citations: 573 U.S. 228 (more) 134 S. Ct. 2369; 189 L. Ed. 2d 312

Case history
- Prior: Lane v. Cent. Ala. Cmty. Coll., 523 F. App'x 709 (11th Cir. 2013); cert. granted, 571 U.S. 1161 (2014).

Holding
- Government employee speech that is made during trial is protected citizen speech, and the employee cannot be fired for comments made in that setting.

Court membership
- Chief Justice John Roberts Associate Justices Antonin Scalia · Anthony Kennedy; Clarence Thomas · Ruth Bader Ginsburg; Stephen Breyer · Samuel Alito; Sonia Sotomayor · Elena Kagan

Case opinions
- Majority: Sotomayor, joined by unanimous
- Concurrence: Thomas, joined by Scalia and Alito

Lane v. Franks, 573 U.S. 228 (2014), is a U.S. Supreme Court case involving public employee's freedom of speech rights. Edward Lane sued Steve Franks for unfairly firing him, out of retaliation for sworn testimony Lane gave during a federal fraud case. The Eleventh Circuit originally ruled in favor of Franks, “denying [Lane] first amendment protection to subpoenaed testimony” (Page 6, section I). The case was argued before the Supreme Court on April 28, 2014. The case was decided on June 19, 2014.

The Supreme Court sided with Lane that he was not responsible for something he said during a federal trial. However, the court could not award damages, because Frank's qualified immunity protected him from being sued in his personal capacity. The case is an important vote of confidence from the Supreme Court about governmental employees not being held responsible for speech that is made as a public citizen on a matter of public concern. It is in line with the Pickering v. Board of Education ruling of 1968 (Opinion para. 1).

== Background ==
Edward Lane accepted a role at Central Alabama Community College (CACC) in 2006, as the director of Community Intensive Training for Youth (CITY). Lane proceeded to terminate Suzanne Schmitz. Schmitz was a state representative and on the programs payroll, despite not performing any duties. Lane was then subpoenaed to testify “regarding the events that led to his terminating Schmitz” in two federal trials for fraud (Section 1, para. 5). In 2009 after the conclusion of the trials Steve Franks, the CACC president, terminated 29 employees.

Lane was among the employees that got termination letters. Franks rescinded 27 of the 29 terminations, but two, including Lane's were not rescinded. Lane then sued Franks in “federal district court and alleged that his termination from the CITY program was in retaliation for his testimony against Schmitz and therefore violated his First Amendment right to free speech. Lane sued Franks in his official and private capacities as the president of CACC.

== District Court and Circuit Court rulings ==
The Federal District Court for the Northern District of Alabama ruled on behalf of Franks. Citing that because Lane learned of the information on the job he was not protected as a citizen on a matter of public concern. They also ruled that Franks was protected because he had qualified immunity. The Eleventh Circuit Court of Appeals affirmed the district court’s decision.

== Supreme Court ruling ==
“The critical question is whether the speech at issue is itself ordinarily within the scope of an employee’s duties, not whether it merely concerns those duties. Corruption in a public program and misuse of state funds involve matter of significant public concern; the form and context of the speech, sworn testimony in a judicial proceeding, fortify that conclusion” (Summary).

In a unanimous decision on behalf of Franks, the court affirmed in part, reversed in part, and remanded in part, for further judicial ruling (Section 5, para. 2). The court said that Lane's speech was protected under the first amendment. However, “previous precedent, specifically Morris v. Crow, had held that public employee testimony was unprotected speech, and thus when Franks fired Lane, he was not violating a clearly established constitutional right” (Para. 4).

Since that is the case Franks was entitled to qualified immunity, so the Supreme Court affirmed the Eleventh Circuit’s ruling about “claims against Franks in his individual capacity” (Section 5). The court remanded the case for further proceedings dealing with Frank's defense of sovereign immunity in his official capacities. This ruling does chip away at the precedent set by the Supreme Courts ruling in Garcetti v. Ceballos, just eight years earlier.

== Amicus briefs ==
Multiple amicus briefs were filed, mostly on the part of Lane. Nine briefs were filed in support of Lane, while one was filed in support of Franks. One was filed by the American government on a neutral ground, both advocating for affirming and reversing part of the Eleventh Circuit’s decision. Among the most notable organizations to file briefs in support of Lane were the ACLU, Alliance Defending Freedom, and National Whistle Blowers Center. All three of these amicus briefs, point out the importance of protecting employee speech made in the context of a federal trial. With the ACLU saying “[a]t a minimum, the State of Alabama certainly had no interest in preventing Edward Lane from complying with a subpoena issued by the United States and providing truthful testimony about public corruption in a federal criminal trial” (Page 29).

== Media coverage ==
Multiple media outlets covered the case when it first broke. Those included NPR, The Washington Post, and The New York Times. All of those media outlets applauded the Supreme Court for protecting the public employee's freedom of speech rights, while also noting the hurdle Lane faced in actually winning damages. With the New York Times writing “[w]hile Mr. Lane established an important legal principle, he will not benefit from it. In the second part of her opinion, Justice Sotomayor wrote that Mr. Franks, the official who fired him, was protected by qualified immunity” (Para. 16). There was even a law review done by Thomas A. Schweitzer, of Touro College. The review really sums up the idea that all the decision really did was show the convoluted nature that the courts now have to consider because of previous precedent set in multiple cases, including the Garcetti case. Schweitzer does agree with the court's decision of protecting Mr. Lane's freedom of speech rights. Edward Lane has written a book about his Supreme Court victory in Whistleblower: Having Ethics Regardless of the Outcome.

== Subsequent developments ==
With the case being decided relatively recently, there have not been many subsequent opinions on the matter of governmental employee speech. Lane v. Franks has not been referenced directly in any subsequent court cases, at any level. The most recent development comes from Heffernan v. City of Paterson, decided in April 2016, which dealt with a similar issue. The Supreme Court ruled in favor of Heffernan who had been fired because he supported a certain candidate that was running for mayor. Justice Breyer said “The Constitution prohibits a government employer from discharging or demoting an employee because the employee supports a particular political candidate” (Section 2, para. 1).

== See also ==
- Qualified Immunity
- Sovereign Immunity
- 1st Amendment
