= Lozano v. Montoya Alvarez =

- Supreme Court of the United States

Decided March 5, 2014
- Full case name: Lozano v. Montoya Alvarez
- Citations: 572 U.S. 1 (more)

Holding
- The one-year period in which the Hague Convention on the Civil Aspects of International Child Abduction provides a parent with an automatic return remedy cannot be equitably tolled.

Court membership
- Chief Justice John Roberts Associate Justices Antonin Scalia · Anthony Kennedy; Clarence Thomas · Ruth Bader Ginsburg; Stephen Breyer · Samuel Alito; Sonia Sotomayor · Elena Kagan

Case opinion
- Majority: Thomas, joined by unanimous

Laws applied
- Hague Convention on the Civil Aspects of International Child Abduction

Lozano v. Montoya Alvarez, 572 U.S. 1 (2014), was a United States Supreme Court case in which the court held that the one-year period in which the Hague Convention on the Civil Aspects of International Child Abduction provides a parent with an automatic return remedy cannot be equitably tolled.

== Background ==
When one parent abducts a child and flees to another country, the other parent may file a petition in that country for the return of the child pursuant to the Hague Convention on the Civil Aspects of International Child Abduction (Hague Convention or Convention). If the parent files a petition within one year of the child's removal, a court "shall order the return of the child forthwith." But when the petition is filed after the 1-year period expires, the court "shall... order the return of the child, unless it is demonstrated that the child is now settled in [their] new environment."

Montoya Alvarez and Lozano resided with their daughter in London, England until November 2008, when Montoya Alvarez left with the child for a women's shelter. In July 2009, Montoya Alvarez and the child left the United Kingdom and ultimately settled in New York City. Lozano did not locate Montoya Alvarez and the child until November 2010, more than 16 months after Montoya Alvarez and the child had left the United Kingdom. At that point, Lozano filed a Petition for Return of Child pursuant to the Hague Convention in the Southern District of New York. Finding that the petition was filed more than one year after removal, the court denied the petition on the basis that the child was now settled in New York. It also held that the 1-year period could not be extended by equitable tolling. The Second Circuit Court of Appeals affirmed.

== Opinion of the court ==
The Supreme Court issued an opinion on March 5, 2014.
