= Robers v. United States =

Benjamin Robers v. United States
- Supreme Court of the United States

Argued February 25, 2014 Decided May 5, 2014
- Full case name: Benjamin Robers v. United States
- Docket no.: 12-9012
- Argument: Oral argument

Case history
- Prior: Plaintiff convicted of mortgage fraud, US Dis. Ct.; Petitioner files motion for recalculation of restitution, United States v. Robers, 698 F.3d 937 (7th Cir. 2012).

Holding
- Restitution in cases involving mortgage fraud is determined by the actual money lent not the value of the property.

Court membership
- Chief Justice John Roberts Associate Justices Antonin Scalia · Anthony Kennedy; Clarence Thomas · Ruth Bader Ginsburg; Stephen Breyer · Samuel Alito; Sonia Sotomayor · Elena Kagan

Case opinions
- Majority: Breyer, joined by unanimous
- Concurrence: Sotomayor, joined by Ginsburg

Laws applied
- Mandatory Victim's Restitution Act (18 U.S.C. §§3663A–366)

Robers v. United States, 572 U.S. 639 (2014), is a US criminal law case. The United States Supreme Court held in a unanimous decision that restitution in cases involving mortgage fraud is determined by the actual money lent not the value of the property.

== Background ==
A provision of the Mandatory Victims Restitution Act of 1996 requires property crime offenders to pay "an amount equal to the value of the property" minus "the value of any part of the property that is returned." Benjamin Robers had been convicted of mortgage fraud. The District Court had ordered Robers to pay the difference between the amount lent to him and the amount the banks received in selling the houses that had served as collateral for the loans. Robers claimed that the District Court should have instead reduced the restitution amount by the value of the houses on the date the banks took title to them since that was when "part of the property" was "returned."

== Supreme Court ==
The Supreme Court affirmed the Appellate and District courts. In that provision of the MVRA, the phrase "any part of the property" refers to the property that was lost as a result of the crime—in this case, involving a fraudulent loan application, the money lent by the bank. The property is not "returned" until it is sold and the victim receives money from the sale. Here, the court said that means that a sentencing court should reduce the amount of restitution by the amount of money the bank received when it sold the houses that were collateral for the fraudulent loans, rather than by the value of the houses when the bank foreclosed on them.
