= BG Group plc v. Republic of Argentina =

- Supreme Court of the United States

Decided March 5, 2014
- Full case name: BG Group plc v. Republic of Argentina
- Citations: 572 U.S. 25 (more)

Holding
- A court of the United States that is reviewing an arbitration award made under a treaty should interpret and apply "threshold" provisions concerning arbitration using the framework developed for interpreting similar provisions in ordinary contracts.

Court membership
- Chief Justice John Roberts Associate Justices Antonin Scalia · Anthony Kennedy; Clarence Thomas · Ruth Bader Ginsburg; Stephen Breyer · Samuel Alito; Sonia Sotomayor · Elena Kagan

Case opinions
- Majority: Breyer, joined by Scalia, Thomas, Ginsburg, Alito, Kagan; Sotomayor (except Part IV–A–1)
- Concurrence: Sotomayor (in part)
- Dissent: Roberts, joined by Kennedy

BG Group plc v. Republic of Argentina, 572 U.S. 25 (2014), was a United States Supreme Court case in which the court held that a court of the United States that is reviewing an arbitration award made under a treaty should interpret and apply "threshold" provisions concerning arbitration using the framework developed for interpreting similar provisions in ordinary contracts.

== Background ==
A 1990 bilateral investment treaty between the United Kingdom and Argentina authorizes a party to submit a dispute "to the decision of the competent tribunal of the Contracting Party in whose territory the investment was made," i.e., a local court; and it permits arbitration "where, after a period of eighteen months has elapsed from the moment when the dispute was submitted to [that] tribunal..., the said tribunal has not given its final decision."

Petitioner BG Group plc, a British firm, belonged to a consortium with a majority interest in MetroGAS, an Argentine entity awarded an exclusive license to distribute natural gas in Buenos Aires. At the time of BG Group's investment, Argentine law provided that gas "tariffs" would be calculated in U.S. dollars and would be set at levels sufficient to assure gas distribution firms a reasonable return. But Argentina later amended the law, changing (among other things) the calculation basis to Argentine pesos. MetroGAS' profits soon became losses. Invoking Article 8, BG Group sought arbitration, which the parties sited in Washington, D.C.

BG Group claimed that Argentina's new laws and practices violated the treaty, which forbids the "expropriation" of investments and requires each nation to give "fair and equitable treatment" to investors from the other. Argentina denied those claims and also argued that the arbitrators lacked "jurisdiction" to hear the dispute because BG Group had not complied with Article 8's local litigation requirement. The arbitration panel concluded that it had jurisdiction, finding, among other things, that Argentina's conduct (such as also enacting new laws that hindered recourse to its judiciary by firms in BG Group's situation) had excused BG Group's failure to comply with Article 8's requirement.

On the merits, the panel found that Argentina had not expropriated BG Group's investment but had denied BG Group "fair and equitable treatment." It awarded damages to BG Group. Both sides sought review in federal district court: BG Group to confirm the award under the New York Convention and the Federal Arbitration Act (FAA), and Argentina to vacate the award, in part on the ground that the arbitrators lacked jurisdiction under the FAA. The District Court confirmed the award, but the Court of Appeals for the District of Columbia Circuit vacated. The D.C. Circuit found that the interpretation and application of Article 8's requirement were matters for courts to decide de novo, i.e., without deference to the arbitrators' views; that the circumstances did not excuse BG Group's failure to comply with the requirement; and that BG Group had to commence a lawsuit in Argentina's courts and wait 18 months before seeking arbitration. Thus, the court held, the arbitrators lacked authority to decide the dispute.

== Opinion of the court ==
The Supreme Court issued an opinion on March 5, 2014. The court decreed that United States courts should review treaties' arbitration provisions using the framework developed for interpreting similar provisions in ordinary contracts. Under that framework, the local litigation requirement in this case was a matter for arbitrators primarily to interpret and apply. The court remanded and ordered the lower court to review the arbitrator's interpretation with deference.
