= United States v. Castleman =

- Supreme Court of the United States

Argued January 15, 2014 Decided March 26, 2014
- Full case name: United States v. James Alvin Castleman
- Docket no.: 12-1371
- Citations: 572 U.S. 157 (more) 134 S.Ct. 1405, 188 L. Ed. 2d 426

Case history
- Prior: 695 F. 3d 582 (CA6 2012)

Holding
- The "physical force" requirement under 18 U.S.C. § 922(g)(9), which criminalizes possession of a firearm by a person convicted of a 'misdemeanor crime of domestic violence,' is satisfied by the “offensive touching” degree of force that supports a common-law battery conviction and does not require the greater showing of violent contact.

Court membership
- Chief Justice John Roberts Associate Justices Antonin Scalia · Anthony Kennedy; Clarence Thomas · Ruth Bader Ginsburg; Stephen Breyer · Samuel Alito; Sonia Sotomayor · Elena Kagan

Case opinions
- Majority: Sotomayor, joined by Roberts, Kennedy, Ginsburg, Breyer, Kagan
- Concurrence: Scalia (in part and in judgment)
- Concurrence: Alito (in judgment), joined by Thomas

Laws applied
- Domestic Violence Offender Gun Ban

United States v. Castleman, 572 U.S. 157 (2014), was a United States Supreme Court case decided in 2014. The Court held that under 18 U. S. C. §922(g)(9), a federal statute which prohibits possession of firearms by someone convicted of a "misdemeanor crime of domestic violence", a conviction does not have to involve the use of violent force to qualify for this prohibition. Instead, the Court concluded that a crime qualifies as a "misdemeanor crime of domestic violence" so long as the amount of force used to commit the crime was sufficient to support a conviction for common-law battery.
