= Burt v. Titlow =

- Supreme Court of the United States

Argued October 8, 2013 Decided November 5, 2013
- Full case name: Sherry L. Burt, Warden, Petitioner v. Vonlee Nicole Titlow
- Docket no.: 12-414
- Citations: 571 U.S. 12 (more) 134 S. Ct. 10; 187 L. Ed. 2d 348; 2013 U.S. LEXIS 8039; 82 U.S.L.W. 4007
- Opinion announcement: Opinion announcement

Case history
- Prior: Leave to appeal denied by Michigan Supreme Court, People v. Titlow, 470 Mich. 867, 680 N.W.2d 900 (2004); 480 Mich. 890, 738 N.W.2d 715 (2007); habeas corpus petition denied, Titlow v. Burt, No. 2:07-cv-13614 (E.D. Mich. Oct. 19, 2010), reversed, 680 F.3d 577 (6th Cir. 2012); cert. granted, 568 U.S. 1191 (2013).

Holding
- Federal courts must defer to a state court's finding of fact as long as it is reasonable.

Court membership
- Chief Justice John Roberts Associate Justices Antonin Scalia · Anthony Kennedy; Clarence Thomas · Ruth Bader Ginsburg; Stephen Breyer · Samuel Alito; Sonia Sotomayor · Elena Kagan

Case opinions
- Majority: Alito, joined by Roberts, Scalia, Kennedy, Thomas, Breyer, Sotomayor, Kagan
- Concurrence: Sotomayor
- Concurrence: Ginsburg (in judgment)

Laws applied
- Antiterrorism and Effective Death Penalty Act

Burt v. Titlow, 571 U.S. 12 (2013), was a United States Supreme Court case in which the Court held that when a state court makes a factual determination the federal courts must defer to its judgment so long as it is reasonable.

== Background ==
Vonlee Nicole Titlow, a transgender woman and her aunt, Billie Rogers were arrested for the murder of Rogers' husband, Don (Titlow's uncle). In 2000, Titlow poured vodka down her uncle's throat while her aunt smothered him with a pillow. Rogers then paid her niece $100,000 for assistance and to pay for Titlow's gender-affirming surgery. Even though Titlow did not actually participate in the murder of her uncle, she could be found guilty of murder through the felony murder rule. Prior to Don's murder, Billie was a gambling addict and Don threatened to leave her if her gambling habit does not stop. Titlow was later arrested after her boyfriend reported Titlow to the police.

The attorney for Titlow explained that the prosecution had the evidence to convict her for murder in the first degree. The attorney obtained a plea bargain for manslaughter in exchange for her testimony against her aunt and the Michigan trial court approved the plea bargain.

While Titlow was in custody waiting to testify against Rogers, a sheriff's deputy advised her not to plead guilty if she did not believe that she was guilty. Not understanding the felony murder rule, she then obtained a new attorney, Fred Toca. Through Toca she demanded a lower sentence (three to seven as opposed to seven to 15). The prosecutor declined the offer and Titlow withdrew her plea in open court. Without Titlow's testimony, Billie Rogers was acquitted and later died of cancer. Titlow stated that she felt guilty for her uncle's murder.

Before entering prison in 2002, Titlow received silicone injections to enhance her breast size. In 2006, she complained of having breast problems and three years later, Titlow received bilateral mastectomy after approved by officials.

== Trial ==
After her plea withdrawal, Titlow was placed on trial for murder. Her lawyer, however, did no investigation in the case before representing her in trial nor did he contact her previous lawyer. In addition as a retainer fee he obtained some legal rights to Titlow's biography, creating a conflict of interest.

During her trial, Titlow testified that she did not harm her uncle in any way and tried to prevent her aunt from harming him. However, Titlow had made out-of-court statements that plainly described her participation in her uncle's death. The jury convicted her of murder in the second degree sentencing her to 20 to 40 years in prison.

== State appeal ==
Removing Toca as counsel Titlow appealed to the Michigan Court of Appeals. She argued that Toca had advised her to withdraw her plea without doing any research on her case therefore providing her with ineffective counsel. The Appeals Court rejected her argument, stating that her withdrawal of the plea bargain started with her conversation with the sheriff's deputy, not Toca. The Court stated "[w]hen a defendant proclaims…innocence…, it is not objectively unreasonable to recommend that the defendant refrain from pleading guilty-no matter how 'good' the deal may appear".

Titlow filed a motion under The Antiterrorism and Effective Death Penalty Act, requesting a review by federal court.

== District Court ==
The District Court rejected Titlow's argument and the Michigan Courts decision was "completely reasonable". It made the point that "counsel could not be ineffective by trying to negotiate a better plea agreement…". Titlow appealed.

== Appeals Court ==
The Court of Appeals for the Sixth Circuit reversed the District Court's ruling. It found in the record that Titlow's decision to withdraw her offer was based on the fact that the offer was much higher than Michigan's guidelines for second-degree murder. The record also shows that there is no indication that Toca informed his client of the consequences of withdrawing her plea. Therefore, she was rendered ineffective counsel because Titlow lost the benefit of the plea bargain.

The Circuit Court remanded the case, ordering that the prosecution reoffer the original plea bargain and that the state court should find some remedy for the violation of her right to ineffectual counsel.

== Decision of the court ==
The court held unanimously, with Justice Alito writing for the majority. The Court reversed the Sixth Circuit arguing that the Appellate Court had not applied the doubly differential standard. Under this standard federal courts must give credit to the State Court's factual findings so long as it was reasonable.

Alito makes the point that where there is a record the defendant adamantly asserted her innocence; therefore on its face the plea withdrawal was reasonable. In addition, there is no factual record on how long Toca took to prepare for Titlow's case, therefore the court cannot jump to the conclusion that just because there is an absence of record counsel was ineffective.

Justice Sotomayor concurred with the entire judgment expanding on Alito's opinion stating that regardless of a defendant's assertion of innocence counsel must make its own conclusion and offer clear advice of outcomes. Only then may counsel bow to the wishes of the defendant.

Justice Ginsburg did not join with the majority only concurring the outcome of the case. She found the State's argument that Toca had acted reasonably "dubious". However, because Titlow's aunt was later acquitted then died, there was no ability for the State to reoffer her original plea.
