= Loughrin v. United States =

- Supreme Court of the United States

Argued April 1, 2014 Decided June 23, 2014
- Full case name: Loughrin v. United States
- Docket no.: 13-316
- Citations: 573 U.S. 351 (more)
- Argument: Oral argument

Holding
- A conviction of the crime of knowingly executing a scheme to obtain property owned by, or under the custody of, a bank "by means of false or fraudulent pretenses," does not require the government to prove that a defendant intended to defraud a financial institution.

Court membership
- Chief Justice John Roberts Associate Justices Antonin Scalia · Anthony Kennedy; Clarence Thomas · Ruth Bader Ginsburg; Stephen Breyer · Samuel Alito; Sonia Sotomayor · Elena Kagan

Case opinions
- Majority: Kagan, joined by unanimous
- Concur/dissent: Scalia, joined by Thomas

Laws applied
- 18 U.S.C. § 1344

Loughrin v. United States, 573 U.S. 351 (2014), was a United States Supreme Court case about con man Kevin Loughrin in which the Court held that a conviction of the crime of knowingly executing a scheme to obtain property owned by, or under the custody of, a bank "by means of false or fraudulent pretenses," does not require the government to prove that a defendant intended to defraud a financial institution.

== Background ==
Loughrin, a fraudster living in Utah, conducted a check forgery scheme with his accomplice Theresa Thongsarn. He disguised himself as a Mormon missionary and went door-to-door in Salt Lake City, stealing checks out of resident's mailboxes. Loughrin often bleached the checks to erase any original writing and filled them out with new information. He would then visit Target stores, pay for merchandise with the altered check, leave the store, walk back inside, and promptly return the goods for cash.

At one point, he performed this scheme 6 times at Target with checks drawn from federally insured banks. Loughrin and Thongsarn were charged with 6 counts of committing federal bank fraud for each of the forged checks, as well as 2 counts of aggravated identity theft and 1 count of possession of stolen mail. In district court, Loughrin was convicted on all counts and sentenced to 3 years in prison.

Loughrin appealed his conviction on the grounds that his delay before trial violated his right to a speedy trial and that he did not intend to defraud a bank and therefore couldn't be convicted of the 6 bank fraud charges. The United States Court of Appeals for the Tenth Circuit affirmed the district court's conviction and rejected both of Loughrin's arguments. Loughrin petitioned to the Supreme Court, who granted certiorari on Dec 13, 2013.
