= United States v. Apel =

- Supreme Court of the United States

Decided February 26, 2014
- Full case name: United States v. Apel
- Citations: 571 U.S. 359 (more)

Holding
- A "military installation" for purposes of determining whether someone has trespassed after being ordered to leave by a commanding officer encompasses the commanding officer's entire area of responsibility, and it includes areas within the base where the public may visit through easements.

Court membership
- Chief Justice John Roberts Associate Justices Antonin Scalia · Anthony Kennedy; Clarence Thomas · Ruth Bader Ginsburg; Stephen Breyer · Samuel Alito; Sonia Sotomayor · Elena Kagan

United States v. Apel, 571 U.S. 359 (2014), was a United States Supreme Court case in which the court held that a "military installation" for purposes of determining whether someone has trespassed after being ordered to leave by a commanding officer encompasses the commanding officer's entire area of responsibility, and it includes areas within the base where the public may visit through easements.

== Background ==
Vandenberg Air Force Base has been designated a "closed base," meaning that civilians may not enter without express permission. The US Air Force has granted an easement over two areas of the Base, and two public highways traverse the Base. Adjacent to one of those highways is an area that the government has designated for peaceful protests. The Base commander has enacted several restrictions to control the protest area and has issued an advisory stating that anyone who fails to adhere to the protest area policies may be barred from entering the Base.

John Dennis Apel was barred from the Base for trespassing and vandalism but continued to enter the protest area. A Magistrate Judge convicted him of violating 18 U. S. C. §1382, which makes it a crime to reenter a "military installation" after having been ordered not to do so "by any officer or person in command." On appeal, the federal district court rejected Apel's defense that §1382 does not apply to the designated protest area. The Ninth Circuit Court of Appeals reversed. It held that because the easement through Vandenberg deprived the government of exclusive possession, §1382 did not cover the portion of the Base where Apel's protest occurred.

== Opinion of the court ==
The Supreme Court issued an opinion on February 26, 2014.
