= CTS Corp. v. Waldburger =

- Supreme Court of the United States

Decided June 9, 2014
- Full case name: CTS Corp. v. Waldburger
- Citations: 573 U.S. 1 (more)

Holding
- North Carolina’s statute of repose is not preempted by the Comprehensive Environmental Response, Compensation, and Liability Act of 1980, which instead only preempts state statutes of limitations on bringing state-law environmental tort cases.

Court membership
- Chief Justice John Roberts Associate Justices Antonin Scalia · Anthony Kennedy; Clarence Thomas · Ruth Bader Ginsburg; Stephen Breyer · Samuel Alito; Sonia Sotomayor · Elena Kagan

Case opinions
- Majority: Kennedy
- Concurrence: Scalia (in part), joined by Roberts, Thomas, Alito
- Dissent: Ginsburg, joined by Breyer

Laws applied
- Comprehensive Environmental Response, Compensation, and Liability Act of 1980

CTS Corp. v. Waldburger, 573 U.S. 1 (2014), was a United States Supreme Court case in which the Court held that north Carolina’s statute of repose is not preempted by the Comprehensive Environmental Response, Compensation, and Liability Act of 1980, which instead only preempts state statutes of limitations on bringing state-law environmental tort cases.
