= Bond v. United States (2014) =

- Supreme Court of the United States

Argued November 5, 2013 Decided June 2, 2014
- Full case name: Carol Anne Bond, Petitioner v. United States
- Docket no.: 12-158
- Citations: 572 U.S. 844 (more) 134 S. Ct. 2077; 189 L. Ed. 2d 1
- Argument: Oral argument
- Decision: Opinion

Case history
- Prior: Bond v. United States, 564 U.S. 211 (2011); on remand, 681 F.3d 149 (3d Cir. 2012); cert. granted, 568 U.S. 1140 (2013).

Holding
- The Chemical Weapons Convention Implementation Act does not criminalize "an amateur attempt by a jilted wife to injure her husband's lover" using chemicals.

Court membership
- Chief Justice John Roberts Associate Justices Antonin Scalia · Anthony Kennedy; Clarence Thomas · Ruth Bader Ginsburg; Stephen Breyer · Samuel Alito; Sonia Sotomayor · Elena Kagan

Case opinions
- Majority: Roberts, joined by Kennedy, Ginsburg, Breyer, Sotomayor, Kagan
- Concurrence: Scalia (in judgment), joined by Thomas; Alito (Part I)
- Concurrence: Thomas (in judgment), joined by Scalia; Alito (Parts I, II, and III)
- Concurrence: Alito (in judgment)

Laws applied
- 18 U.S.C. § 229; Concurrences: U.S. Const. arts. I, II, amend. X

Bond v. United States, 572 U.S. 844 (2014), was a United States Supreme Court case concerning whether and how international arms control agreements may regulate local crime. More specifically, it found that an assault committed by the defendant-petitioner, Carol Anne Bond, was not usage of a chemical weapon under section 229(a)(1) of the Chemical Weapons Convention Implementation Act (CWCIA), despite Bond using dangerous toxicants to commit the attack. The case followed up on a 2011 opinion of the same name involving the same parties.

Bond had been convicted of using a chemical weapon after she was caught spreading a mixture of toxic substances around her best friend's home, having learned of an affair between her and Bond's husband. Bond subsequently challenged her conviction on the basis that CWCIA section 229(a)(1) was an unconstitutional infringement on states' rights and that her actions did not violate it. After several years of litigation, including an initial trip to the Supreme Court, the Court heard the case in 2013 and decided it seven months later. Due to the apparent conflict between Bond's "local" crime and the CWCIA's passage pursuant to an international agreement, scholars of American federalism and foreign relations law, especially conservatives, were highly interested in the case's outcome, with some believing that the Court would overturn long-standing precedent on the topic.

The majority opinion, written by Chief Justice John Roberts, vacated Bond's conviction. It found that the CWCIA was not intended and could not properly be read to criminalize conduct like Bond's, given the Chemical Weapons Convention's goal of preventing chemical warfare and other potential mass-casualty scenarios. Samuel Alito, Antonin Scalia, and Clarence Thomas wrote concurrences agreeing with the case's outcome but arguing that the Court should have struck down section 229(a)(1) as unconstitutional.

Because the Court intentionally avoided constitutional questions in its majority opinion and did not overturn any precedents, the legal community largely characterized Bond as unexpectedly narrow and anticlimactic, though some observers have remarked that the case may have more significant implications for foreign relations and federalism than initially thought.

== Background ==
=== Treaties and federalism ===
The United States Constitution contains two important clauses concerning treaties. Article II grants the president the power, "by and with the Advice and Consent of the Senate, to make Treaties, provided two-thirds of the Senators present concur." Article VI describes treaties as forming part of the "supreme Law of the Land," alongside federal statutes and the Constitution itself. Furthermore, Article I permits Congress to "make all Laws which shall be necessary and proper" to carry out other powers of the federal government.

Conversely, the Tenth Amendment restrains the federal government's powers to those described in the Constitution; other powers are "reserved to the States respectively." These provisions, taken together, raised questions over whether Congress could avoid potential states' rights objections to federal legislation by entering into treaties and then passing laws to implement these treaties, especially given that, according to Article VI, federal law preempts, or supersedes, the laws of individual states.

In 1920, the U.S. Supreme Court issued an opinion in Missouri v. Holland, which would prove to be "[t]he seminal decision concerning the scope of the treaty power," as described by Curtis A. Bradley. Holland became particularly well known for its determination that Congress's power to pass treaty-implementing legislation should be assessed differently than its other powers, as well as a passage stating that "If the treaty is valid there can be no dispute about the validity of the statute under Article 1, Section 8, as a necessary and proper means to execute the powers of the Government." This implied that legislation passed by Congress pursuant to a treaty was almost always constitutional, even if it would otherwise exceed the powers allotted to the federal government. In 1957, Holland's meaning was clarified when the Supreme Court ruled in Reid v. Covert that treaties could not grant the government powers "free from the restraints of the Constitution." Holland nonetheless continued to be construed broadly, and lower courts were hesitant to discard its thesis that treaties granted Congress authority that it normally would not have.

For much of the 20th century, the question of the treaty power's scope was thought moot because Congress already had extensive powers under other parts of the Constitution. In the 1990s, however, the Supreme Court began to institute and emphasize restraints on the federal government, reviving the debate over the treaty power's scope. One especially prominent view in favor of overruling Holland was that of Nicholas Quinn Rosenkranz, who believed that treaty-implementing legislation could not exceed Congress's pre-existing powers. Rosenkranz specifically advocated a narrow reading of Article I that separated creating or entering into treaties from enforcing their terms, with the former always being an appropriate subject of legislation and the latter being constrained by the Tenth Amendment. Rosenkranz's position, as well as other arguments in favor of curtailing Holland, sparked academic debate, with supporters and critics of Holland debating over whether it comported with the intended design of the Constitution.

The possibility of revisiting Holland came up in 2012, when the Supreme Court considered Golan v. Holder, which concerned whether legislation passed to implement the Berne Convention, a treaty concerning intellectual property, exceeded Congress's power to establish copyrights. The government had argued that, even if the Court were to find that the legislation exceeded Congress's copyright powers, it would still be constitutional as treaty-implementing legislation under Holland. During oral arguments in Golan, Justice Antonin Scalia commented, "I do not think a treaty can expand the powers of the federal government," implying an openness to overturning Holland. However, Golan was ultimately decided without reliance on the Berne Convention or the treaty power.

=== Chemical weapons Convention ===
The Chemical Weapons Convention (CWC) is a multilateral treaty which prohibits countries from creating, using, or stockpiling chemical weapons. The CWC additionally obligates countries to ensure that non-state actors, such as individuals or organizations, do not obtain or use chemical weapons, including passing criminal legislation to punish such. The United States ratified the CWC in 1997 and Congress passed the Chemical Weapons Implementation Act (CWCIA) in 1998 to bring it in compliance with the treaty. Among other mechanisms to implement the CWC's goals, section 229(a)(1) of the CWCIA criminalizes individual possession and usage of chemical weapons, more specifically making it illegal to "develop, produce, otherwise acquire, transfer directly or indirectly, receive, stockpile, retain, own, possess, or use, or threaten to use, any chemical weapon." The act defines "chemical weapon" as "a toxic chemical and its precursors;" a "toxic chemical," in turn, is defined as "any chemical which through its chemical action on life processes can cause death, temporary incapacitation or permanent harm to humans or animals."

=== Events and procedural history ===
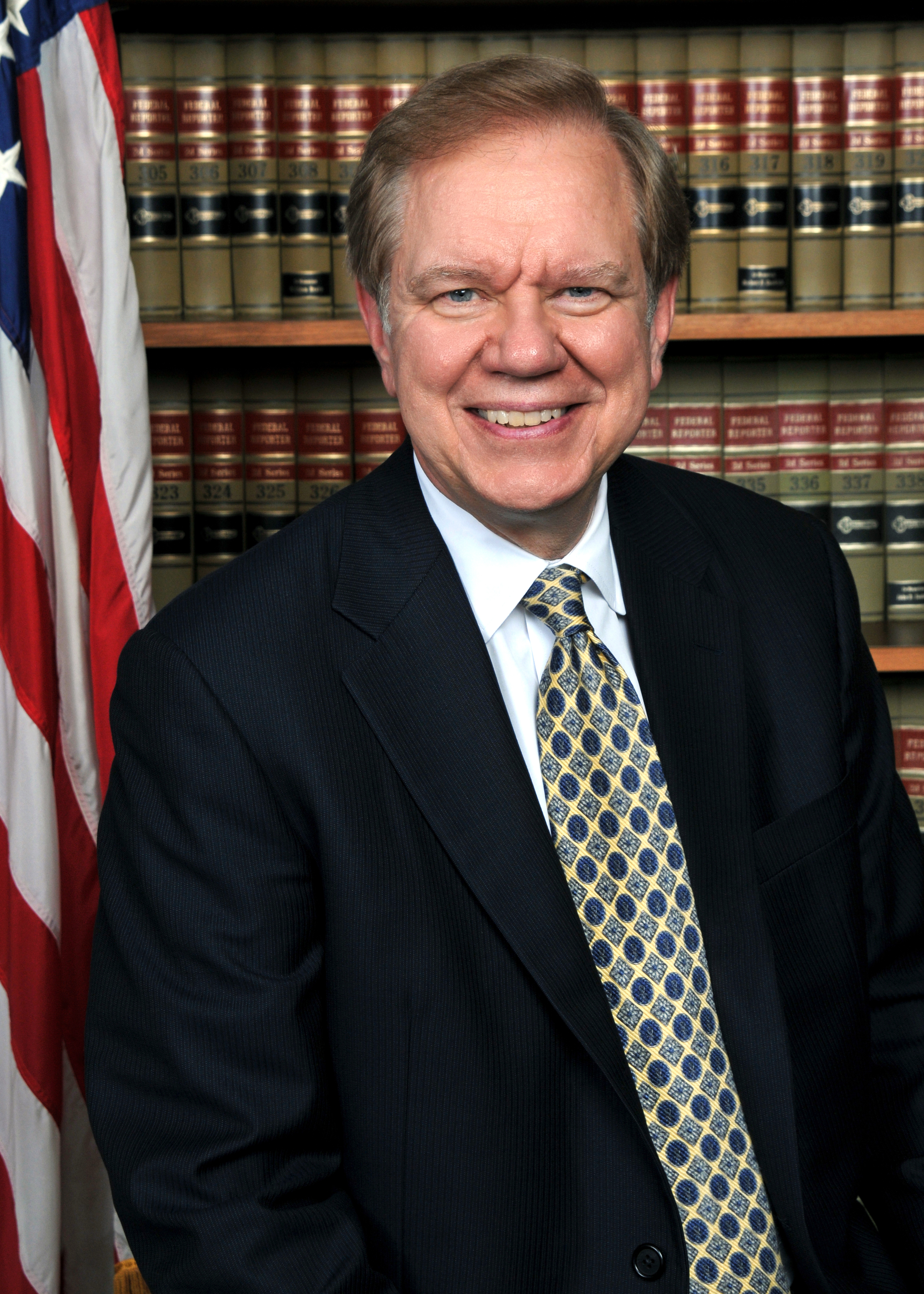
Judge Thomas Ambro voted to uphold Bond's conviction, but warned that, until the Supreme Court intervened, the federal government had a "blank check" to pass any treaty-related law.

In 2005, microbiologist Carol Anne Bond learned that her husband had had an affair with her best friend, Myrlinda Haynes, resulting in pregnancy. Seeking vengeance upon Haynes, Bond stole 10-chloro-10H-phenoxarsine, an arsenic-based compound, from her workplace and ordered potassium dichromate from the Internet. She combined these chemicals into a toxic, bright-orange powder and dusted various surfaces around Haynes's home in Pennsylvania, including doorknobs and the inside of her car, with the substance. In doing so, Bond intended to harm Haynes, but not kill her.

However, the mixture's color alerted Haynes as to Bond's actions, and ultimately, the only injury Haynes suffered at Bond's hands was a small burn on her thumb. Haynes's mail carrier alerted the U.S. Postal Service, which videotaped Bond spreading the mixture on 24 separate occasions. Bond was subsequently arrested in 2007 and, after the trial court denied her motions to dismiss the charges, pleaded guilty to mail fraud and possessing and using a chemical weapon in violation of section 229(a)(1), reserving the right to appeal. After being sentenced to six years in prison, she appealed to the Philadelphia-based Third Circuit Court of Appeals.

The basis of Bond's appeal was that section 229(a)(1) was unconstitutional because it criminalized actions committed entirely within one state; regulating these "local" crimes is traditionally an exclusive power of the states rather than the federal government. Initially, however, the court of appeals found that Bond lacked standing to challenge the law. The Supreme Court reversed this finding on appeal in 2011, requiring the court to decide the actual merits of Bond's claim.

On remand, the court of appeals unanimously upheld her conviction, finding that section 229(a)(1) criminalized her assault on Haynes and, per Holland, was constitutional. Despite this, two of the three judges who heard the appeal, Kent Jordan and Thomas Ambro, suggested that the Supreme Court clarify the nature of Holland, with Ambro warning of a potential "blank check" for Congress to pass any law that was "rationally related to a valid treaty," while judge Marjorie Rendell wrote that federalism was irrelevant to the case. Bond appealed to the Supreme Court, which on January 18, 2013, granted certiorari again, this time to consider Bond's statutory and constitutional arguments.

== Lead-up to the decision ==
Bond's brief to the Supreme Court argued that section 229(a)(1) did not cover her assault on Haynes, and if it did, it exceeded Congress's Article I powers, while the government claimed that any usage of a chemical to harm violated the statute and that a ruling in favor of Bond would, by hampering the ability to implement treaties, cause international concern that the U.S. would not uphold its international obligations. Due to the constitutional question raised by Bond, a significant portion of the legal community believed that the outcome of her case would be a watershed in American federalism and foreign relations, with NPR characterizing it as "the most important decision on the treaty power since 1920 [when Holland was decided]." Given the subject matter of the case, John Bellinger referred to it as "a cause célèbre among some conservatives," and political commentator George Will called it the "most momentous issue" of the term.

On the other hand, Peter Spiro questioned the importance of a decision in Bond's case, noting that few if any instances of Congress actively exercising the treaty power existed, and that most laws passed pursuant to treaties could be passed as more typical legislation. Rick Pildes wrote that, because the subject of the case was Congress's Article I powers to implement treaties, rather than the president and Senate's Article II powers to enter into them, even a favorable ruling for Bond could be circumvented by making a treaty "self-executing," or effective without the need for implementing legislation. Julian Ku agreed and wrote that, if Holland were overruled, it could encourage the government to enter into more self-executing treaties.

Several amicus briefs were submitted to the Court. The Cato Institute, the Claremont Institute's Center for Constitutional Jurisprudence, the Atlantic Legal Foundation, and Edwin Meese jointly submitted a brief arguing that Holland should be overruled. Other briefs supporting Bond came from the Home School Legal Defense Association, Center for Individual Rights, and American Center for Law & Justice. Eric Posner castigated the Cato Institute brief in particular as engaging in a "literal-minded" reading of the Constitution, comparing it to how "a kindergartener [sic] might read a board book" and calling it a sign of "the degraded state of our legal culture." Bond also found an ally in Senator Ted Cruz, who wrote an article for the Harvard Law Review supporting her constitutional arguments.

Columbia Law School professor and future International Court of Justice judge Sarah Cleveland, along with UC Hastings College of the Law professor William S. Dodge submitted a brief arguing that the CWCIA was permissible under a different constitutional provision permitting Congress to "define and punish ... offences against the law of nations," which the two later developed into a Yale Law Journal article. Other groups who filed briefs supporting the government included the American Chemistry Council, Constitutional Accountability Center, and six former legal advisors to the Department of State.

=== Oral arguments ===
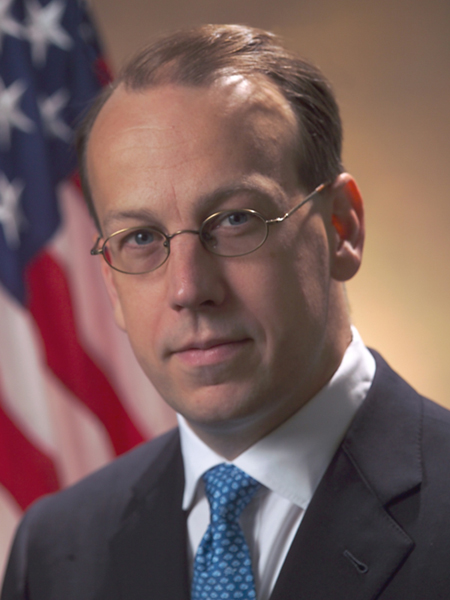
Paul Clement, Bond's attorney

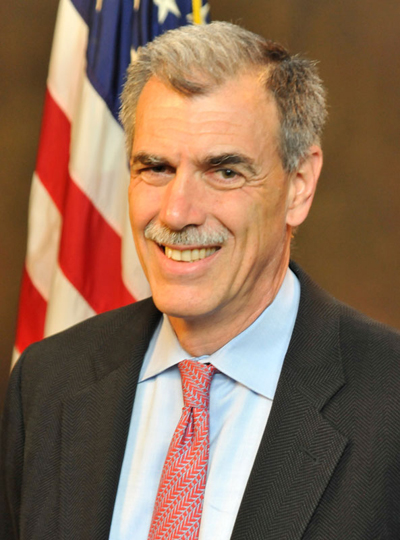
Donald Verrilli, United States Solicitor General

The Supreme Court heard oral arguments on November 5, 2013. Former Solicitor General and Supreme Court argument specialist Paul Clement represented Bond at oral arguments; he had also represented Bond during her prior visit to the Supreme Court. Incumbent Solicitor General Donald B. Verrilli Jr. represented the federal government. The attorneys and justices vigorously debated the scope of both the CWC and the treaty power. Stephen Breyer remarked that the treaty could potentially reach chemicals which, while unlawful, were not "weapons," such as performance-enhancing drugs, while Samuel Alito jokingly pondered whether chocolate, being poisonous to dogs, qualified as a chemical weapon.

A significant topic of the arguments was ways to avoid issuing a constitutional ruling. Clement suggested that the Court construe section 229(a)(1) to only encompass "war-like" usages of chemicals. Anthony Kennedy discussed the possibility of applying the clear statement rule to Bond's case. Breyer remarked that limiting the definition of "chemical weapon" to an enumerated list of substances identified in the CWC's annex could resolve the statutory question. On the other hand, Elena Kagan expressed concern that reading the statute in a way that favored Bond could excuse more heinous crimes involving chemicals, such as mass murder via sarin gas. Verrilli argued against a narrow reading of section 229(a)(1) and emphasized the need for a "comprehensive ban;" Breyer responded that "judges are here to draw lines," though Kagan worried about the judiciary potentially usurping treaty-making.

Despite this, the justices also considered the constitutional question directly. Verrilli emphasized the federal government's "exclusive control over the treaty function," which he claimed was necessary in the Framers' eyes to "knit the nation together as one and allow it to be fully sovereign in the conduct of foreign affairs." Ruth Bader Ginsburg noted an incongruity in the fact that neither party disputed that the CWC itself was constitutional, but the CWCIA did not add anything to the treaty's provisions; Clement responded that the CWC did not regulate individuals, though Kagan pointed out that the treaty did command states to pass laws doing so. The justices also considered the constitutional problem by discussing hypothetical treaties that the government could ratify and implement. Roberts asked Verrilli whether Congress could claim "national police powers" using a treaty, to which Verrilli responded that it was "unimaginable" that the Senate would ratify such a treaty; Kennedy responded by calling the government's prosecution of Bond similarly "unimaginable." Scalia criticized the government for attempting to "drag Congress into areas where it has never been before," and suggested that, taking the government's arguments to the extreme, Congress could force all states to recognize same-sex marriage by ratifying an appropriate treaty.

The justices also expressed worries about the potential effects of the case on American foreign relations. Sonia Sotomayor noted that, at the time of oral arguments, the United States had recently condemned Syria for the Ghouta chemical attack, claiming that "it would be deeply ironic" if American chemical weapons control obligations were to become unconstitutional. Chief Justice John Roberts noted that a prior Supreme Court decision, Medellín v. Texas, had "caused serious conflict with our international obligations" because of its holding that "the federal government does not have the authority to tell the sheriff in Texas what to do." Alito considered a narrow interpretation of "treaty" under the Constitution which would only encompass "matters that are of legitimate concern of a foreign state."

Despite the debate over the constitutionality of section 229(a)(1), neither party discussed Holland in detail. Kagan and Clement briefly discussed it, though Clement distinguished Holland as not encompassing individual conduct. After oral arguments, observers believed that the Court would overturn Bond's conviction, though they were unsure how; Rosenkranz, who helped write the Cato Institute brief, remarked that "the Court may not reach the big question." Holly Doremus of UC Berkeley School of Law conversely speculated that Verrilli's "aggressive" approach could lay groundwork for a sweeping ruling, in contrast to Clement's strategy of permitting a narrower outcome.

== Opinion ==
Chief Justice Roberts invoked John Singer Sargent's painting Gassed as an example of the dangers the CWCIA was intended to prevent.

The Court issued its opinion on June 2, 2014. The justices unanimously overturned Bond's conviction, but were split 6–3 as to reasoning. Chief Justice Roberts wrote the majority opinion, which found that the CWCIA did not criminalize Bond's actions. Contrary to expectations, Roberts did not write about the constitutionality of section 229(a)(1) and confined the opinion to the law's scope.

Roberts began his opinion with a description of John Singer Sargent's painting Gassed, which depicts mustard gas victims during the First World War. Characterizing Bond's crimes as nothing more than "an amateur attempt by a jilted wife to injure her husband's lover, which ended up causing only a minor thumb burn readily treated by rinsing with water," Roberts explained that the CWC, and thus the CWCIA, was intended to prohibit significantly more egregious behavior.

Roberts noted that a guiding principle of statutory interpretation was the "federalism canon," a variant of constitutional avoidance which states that, unless Congress has explicitly said otherwise, courts should not construe federal laws to reach into areas traditionally regulated by states, with one such area being local crime. With this in mind, Roberts wrote that the ordinary meaning of "chemical weapon," in addition to the CWC's purpose as reflected in its historical context and preamble, implied that section 229(a)(1) only criminalized activity related to warfare and terrorism, giving the devastating chemical warfare in the First World War and Iran-Iraq War as an example. Bond's localized assault did not fit this definition, and a reading of section 229(a)(1) that did cover such activity would, according to Roberts, "sweep in everything from the detergent under the kitchen sink to the stain remover in the laundry room;" such a wide interpretation was unexpressed by Congress and unjustifiable in light of the federalism canon. Roberts closed by referring back to Gassed, noting, "There are no life-sized paintings of Bond's rival washing her thumb."

=== Concurrences ===
Concurring justices in Bond

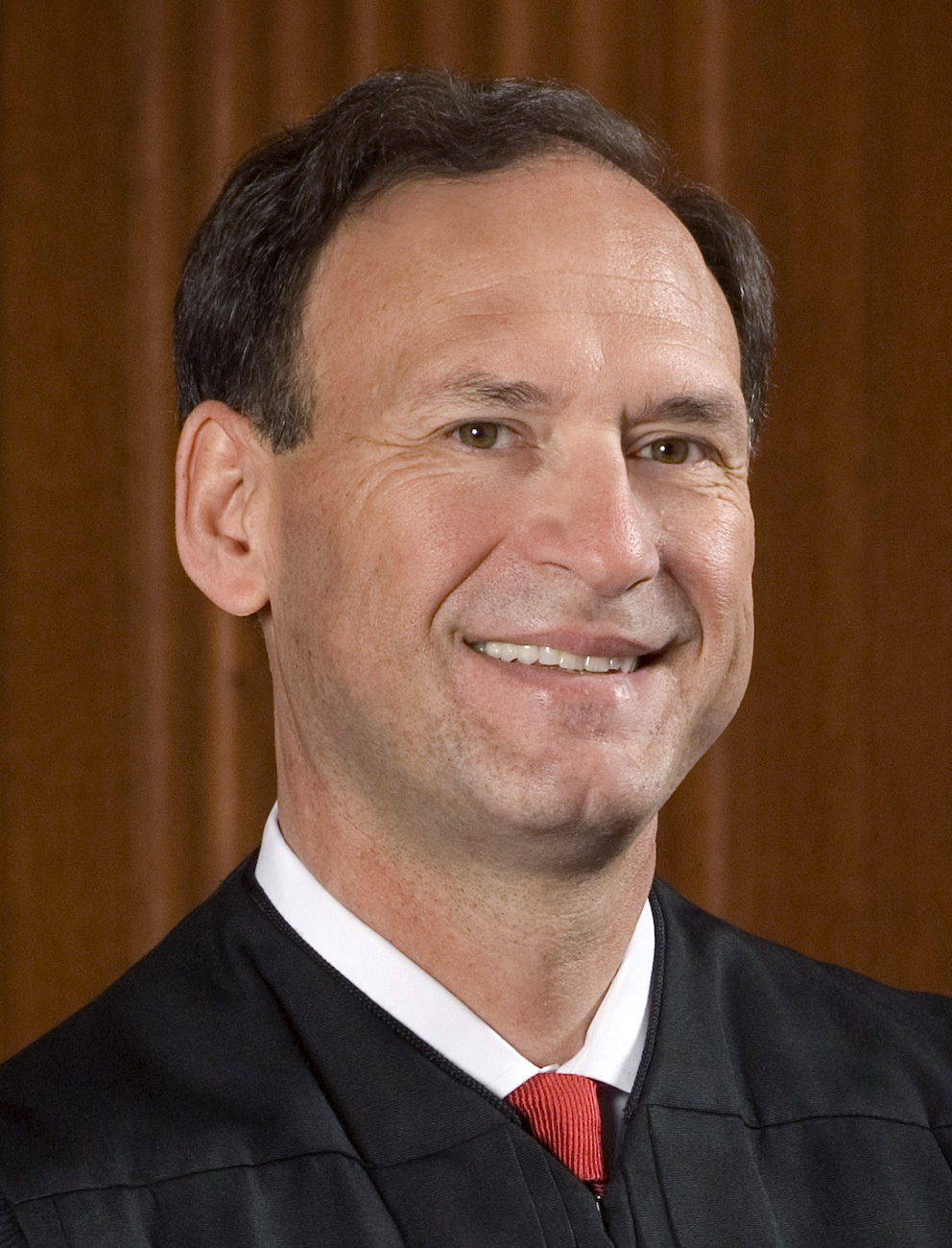
Samuel Alito

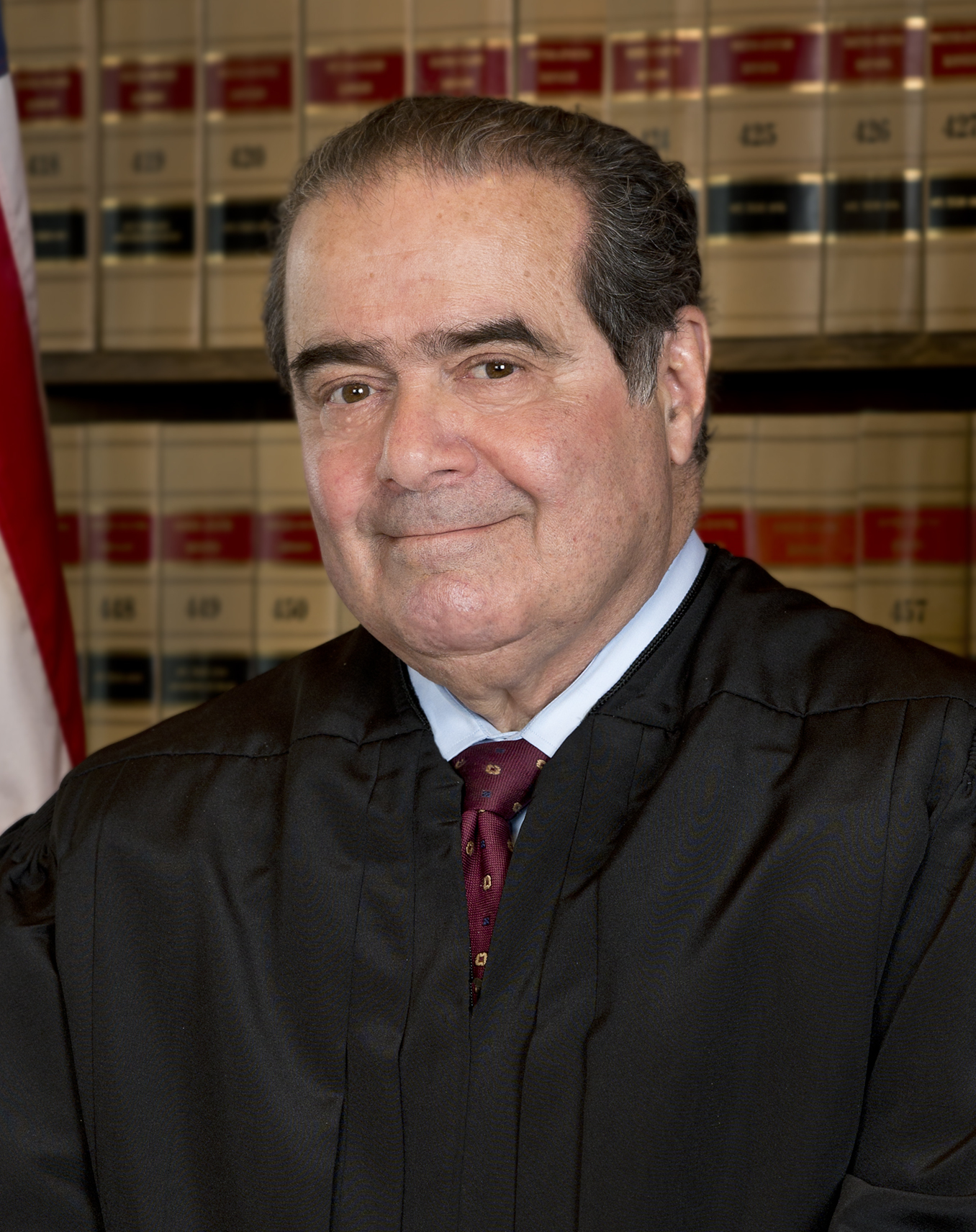
Antonin Scalia

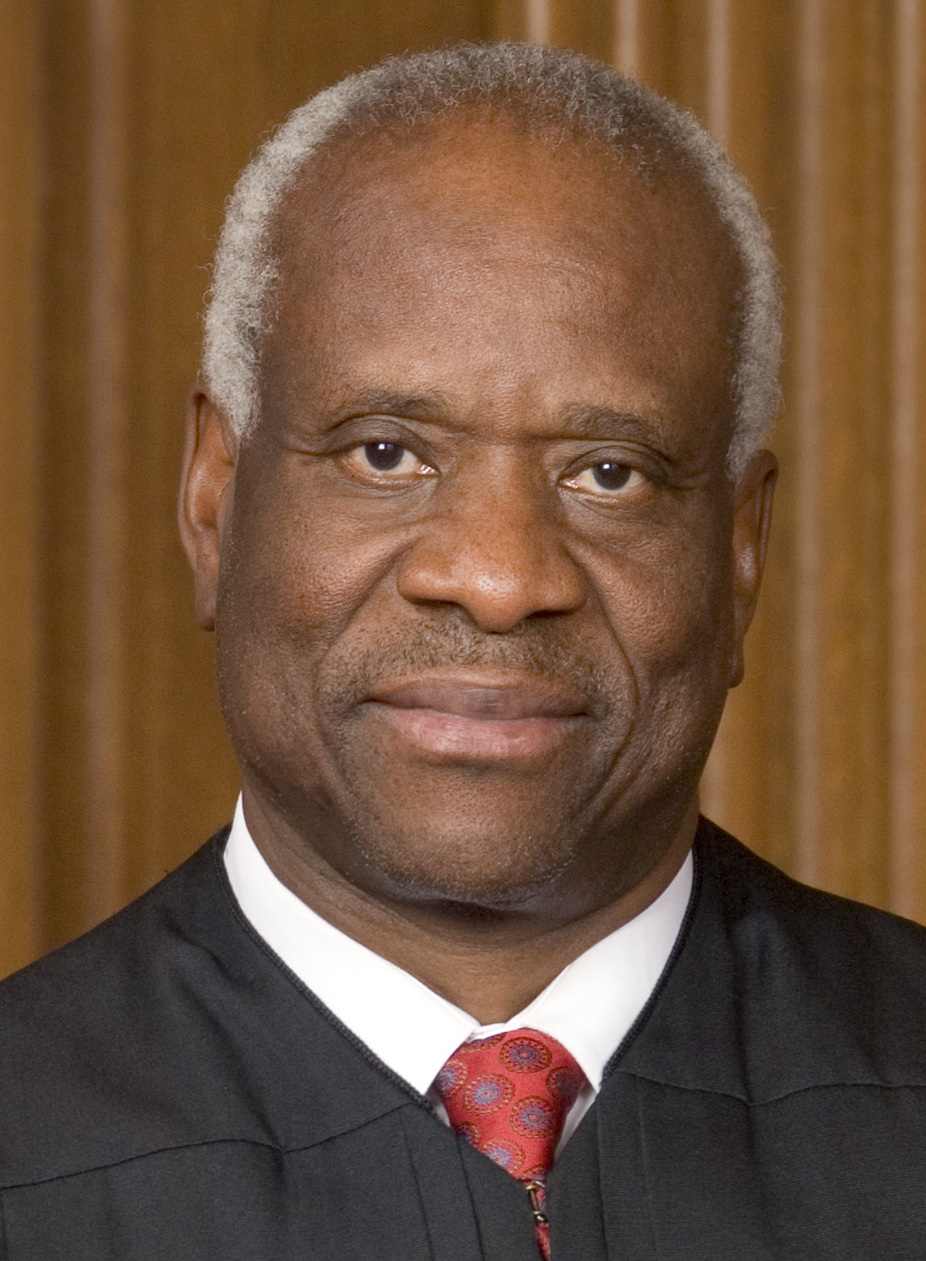
Clarence Thomas

Justices Alito, Scalia, and Clarence Thomas wrote individual concurrences. They all agreed with the majority in vacating Bond's conviction, but believed that section 229(a)(1) was an unconstitutional encroachment on states' rights under the Tenth Amendment. All three called for Holland to be limited or overruled.

Scalia's concurrence began by criticizing the majority's interpretation of section 229(a)(1). He argued that Roberts had unnecessarily employed the federalism canon to distort the otherwise-clear meaning of "chemical weapon," which in his view did, in fact, encompass the chemicals Bond used to attack Haynes. Scalia also criticized the majority's argument that section 229(a)(1) should be read to not encompass household chemicals, noting that such chemicals could be used in weapon-like manners, such as poisoning a water supply. Because of this, Scalia believed that the Court should have considered Bond's constitutional arguments, decrying the majority's interpretation of the statute as "gruesome surgery" intended to shy away from the "obligation" the Court had to strike down unconstitutional legislation.

Turning to the constitutional argument, Scalia considered what kind of treaty-related laws Congress could pass. Adopting Rosenkranz's argument against Holland, Scalia wrote that Article I only empowered Congress to pass laws which helped bring treaties into being, but not laws which implemented or enforced those treaties, which had to be supported by other provisions of the Constitution. Scalia believed that the reading of Article I in Holland granted essentially limitless power to the federal government; in theory, Congress could pass any legislation, unencumbered by the Constitution, simply by repeatedly making treaties with a foreign country.

Thomas joined Scalia's concurrence, but wrote a separate opinion (which Scalia joined) discussing the nature of treaties under Article II. Taking an originalist perspective, he stated that the founding generation would have only viewed agreements on international affairs to be "treaties," and thus the treaty power did not extend to purely domestic matters. However, he noted difficulties in discerning appropriate treaty subjects (in part because neither party discussed the matter in their briefs), expressing hope that "the increasing frequency with which treaties have begun to test the limits of the Treaty Power" would bring a new opportunity to consider the topic in detail.

Alito joined Thomas's concurrence and Scalia's interpretation of section 229(a)(1). In a one-page concurrence, he endorsed Thomas's limitation of the treaty power to "matters of legitimate international concern," noting that, although the "heart" of the CWC was clearly an international matter, "insofar as the Convention may be read to obligate the United States to enact domestic legislation," it was outside the treaty power's proper scope.

== Reactions ==
A decision that might have roared like a lion instead squeaked like a mouse.

— Paul B. Stephan, professor at University of Virginia School of Law

Legal observers characterized the decision, particularly its avoidance of constitutional issues, as anticlimactic. Amy Howe, the founder of SCOTUSblog, compared the decision to the ending of Seinfeld, while Josh Blackman remarked that, though disappointing "[a]t first blush," it was neither "fantastic" nor "terrible." Simon Lazarus of The New Republic, on the other hand, saw the case as a "wake-up call," noting that it was a setback, but not a total defeat, for conservatives hoping to restrict the treaty power.

Spiro speculated that the Court's hesitancy to resolve the constitutional problem may have been due to the case's underlying facts being "too freaky" to make a significant ruling on, while Richard Re of Harvard Law School believed that the expected "grand verdict on Missouri v. Holland" was in the justices' eyes afield of the more practical matter of the prosecution's absurdity. Several months after the decision, during oral arguments in Yates v. United States, which also involved an unusual prosecution under federal law, Scalia sardonically asked the government's attorney whether the prosecutor was "the same guy who brought Bond."

Legal scholars were generally skeptical of the Court's reading of section 229(a)(1). Laurence Tribe harshly criticized the Court's attempt to narrowly read what he perceived as an unambiguous statute, and Heather K. Gerkin considered Bond "the worst of both worlds" for having failed to significantly change federalism whilst also being '"filled with enough analytic holes that it could be dismembered by a 1L [first-year law student]." On the other hand, Richard Lempert, writing for the Brookings Institution, described the Court's interpretation of section 229(a)(1) as "defensible," noting that, although it did not directly consult the statute's legislative history, its intuition that Congress could not have intended the law to cover crimes "as trivial as Bond's" was "most likely correct." Jonathan H. Adler wrote that "reading the statute narrowly so as to avoid the constitutional question" was "a common tactic of the Chief," noting similarities between Bond, Northwest Austin Municipal Utility District No. 1 v. Holder, and National Federation of Independent Business v. Sebelius. Similarly, S. Ernie Walton of Regent University School of Law, writing two years after the initial decision, noted that Bond reflected Roberts's "marked intention to favor precedent, defer to the political branches, and avoid broad, constitutional rulings—despite what the Constitution might require."

Observers also compared the majority opinion with the concurrences, especially Scalia's. David Golove and Marty Lederman called the Court's avoidance of Bond's constitutional arguments "a most welcome reprieve" for the treaty power, given that even the typically-conservative Kennedy and Roberts refused to endorse Scalia and Thomas's arguments against Holland. David Sloss of Santa Clara University School of Law called Roberts's interpretation of the CWCIA "the lesser of two evils," writing that, despite being in his view incorrect, it was nonetheless preferable to Scalia's construction of the Constitution. Monica Hakimi of Columbia Law School remarked that the Court showed its "ambivalence" about the scope of the treaty power, but found the concurrences, particularly Scalia's, unconvincing. Jean Galbraith of Rutgers Law School called Scalia's concurrence "strained," though she agreed with its statutory analysis. Conversely, Rosenkranz, who called the majority's analysis of section 229(a)(1) "dodgy," commended all three concurrences as "some of the most scholarly and thoughtful treaty opinions ever to emanate from the Supreme Court," with particular praise for Scalia's, which he called "extremely important, and exactly right." Ilya Somin found both the majority and concurrences unconvincing, stating that, although he believed that section 229(a)(1) was unlawful, he disagreed with Scalia's concurrence due to its implication that the government could ratify treaties on issues Congress could not legislate on, and disagreed with Thomas's argument that treaties were constrained by subject matter.

Despite the Court's attempt to "sidestep" Holland and the lack of constitutional analysis, some scholars have read the opinion to have more significant implications than traditionally thought, particularly in terms of interpreting treaty-implementing statutes. Michael J. Glennon and Robert D. Sloane have argued that Bond de facto made Holland unworkable, as any statute that implemented a treaty would have to be interpreted in accordance with the federalism canon, defeating the point of permitting treaty-implementing legislation to exceed typical Congressional powers. Ryan Scoville of Marquette University Law School likewise expressed puzzlement at the usage of the federalism canon in the context of Holland and noted that future treaty-implementing legislation would need to clearly express Congress's intent to override state law. Dodge similarly remarked that requiring implementing legislation to follow the federalism canon "potentially creates a wedge between the interpretation of a treaty and its implementing legislation."

Scholars have also discussed Bond's impact in terms of general restraints on federal power. Llewellyn J. Gibbons of University of Toledo College of Law argued that, although Bond could be interpreted narrowly as merely restating the federalism canon, the case's "references to federalism open the door to a broader understanding of State power." Alison L. LaCroix relatedly claimed that Bond implied a "hierarchy" of legislative powers, where treaty implementation was close to the bottom and subject to harsher scrutiny. Conversely, Dylann M. Taxman of Baylor Law School, reflecting ten years after Bond, wrote that the Supreme Court failed to set a precedent restraining the federal government. On the contrary, courts had taken Bond to permit federal prosecutions for any crimes which could lead to mass suffering, local or otherwise.

== See also ==
- Bricker Amendment, proposed limitation of Congress's treaty powers
- Destruction of chemical weapons in the United States
