= Warrantless searches in the United States =

Aspect of United States law enforcement

Warrantless searches are searches and seizures conducted without court-issued search warrants.

In the United States, warrantless searches are restricted under the Fourth Amendment to the United States Constitution, part of the Bill of Rights, which states, "The right of the people to be secure in their persons, houses, papers, and effects, against unreasonable searches and seizures, shall not be violated, and no Warrants shall issue, but upon probable cause, supported by oath or affirmation, and particularly describing the place to be searched, and the persons or things to be seized."

== History ==
In the Thirteen Colonies, agents of the British Empire utilized general warrants to authorize searches in the homes of colonists. Such warrants allowed the holder to search any place for any thing at any time. They were viewed as abuses of power, contributing to increased tensions that ultimately led to the American Revolution. The Fourth Amendment barred all warrantless searches and all general warrants; nevertheless, the interpretation and limitations of the Fourth Amendment and the permissibility of warrantless searches under certain circumstances, such as wartime, have been important in the history of executive and judicial power in the United States.

During the American Revolutionary War, "the Continental Congress regularly received quantities of intercepted British and Tory mail". See intelligence in the American Revolutionary War.

In 1975, the Church Committee, a United States Senate select committee chaired by Frank Church of Idaho, a Democrat, investigated domestic and foreign Cold War area intelligence-gathering by the federal government, including warrantless surveillance on anti-war advocates inside America. The committee report found the "Americans who violated no criminal law and represented no genuine threat to the 'national security' have been targeted, regardless of the stated predicate. In many cases, the implementation of wiretaps and bugs has also been fraught with procedural violations, even when the required procedures were meager, thus compounding the abuse. The inherently intrusive nature of electronic surveillance, moreover, has enabled the Government to generate vast amounts of information – unrelated to any legitimate governmental interest – about the personal and political lives of American citizens."

The "potential criminal liability of the National Security Agency and the Central Intelligence Agency for operations such as SHAMROCK (interception of all international cable traffic from 1945 to 1975) and MINARET (use of watchlists of U.S. dissidents and potential civil disturbers to provide intercept information to law enforcement agencies from 1969 to 1973)" helped persuade president Gerald Ford in 1976 to seek surveillance legislation, which was ultimately enacted as Foreign Intelligence Surveillance Act in 1978.

Abuses of power by the federal government led to reform legislation in the 1970s. Advancing technology began to present questions not directly addressed by the legislation as early as 1985.

In its 1985 report "Electronic Surveillance and Civil Liberties", the nonpartisan Congressional Office of Technology Assessment suggested legislation be considered for a surveillance oversight board. Congress disbanded this agency in 1995.

=== Clinton administration ===
On July 14, 1994, President Clinton's Deputy Attorney General and later 9/11 Commission member Jamie Gorelick testified to the Senate Intelligence Committee that "The Department of Justice believes, and the case law supports, that the president has inherent authority to conduct warrantless physical searches for foreign intelligence purposes … and that the president may, as has been done, delegate this authority to the Attorney General." This "inherent authority" was used to search the home of CIA spy Aldrich Ames without a warrant. "It is important to understand", Gorelick continued, "that the rules and methodology for criminal searches are inconsistent with the collection of foreign intelligence and would unduly frustrate the president in carrying out his foreign intelligence responsibilities".

=== George W. Bush administration ===
==== NSA warrantless surveillance controversy ====
On December 16, 2005, the New York Times printed a story asserting that following 9/11, "President Bush secretly authorized the National Security Agency to eavesdrop on Americans and others inside the United States to search for evidence of terrorist activity without the court-approved warrants ordinarily required for domestic spying", as part of the war on terrorism:

Under a presidential order signed in 2002, the intelligence agency monitored the international telephone calls and international e-mail messages of hundreds, perhaps thousands, of people inside the United States without warrants over the past three years in an effort to track possible "dirty numbers" linked to Al Qaeda, the officials said. The agency, they said, still seeks warrants to monitor entirely domestic communications.

The revelation of this program caused a widespread controversy, with legal experts and politicians concluding that it violates the Foreign Intelligence Surveillance Act and other legal experts saying that the FISA law only applied to domestic calls and not to overseas calls and communications that involved a foreign intelligence threat. Bush administration officials such as the Attorney General defended the program by citing that this was a part of the justification that the Clinton administration used in its warrantless search of Aldrich Ames. They claimed that since Ames was spying for a foreign power, presidential power applied and FISA did not.

==== NSA call database ====
In May 2006, it was revealed that the Bush administration had also been compiling a database of telephone calls, created by the National Security Agency (NSA) with the cooperation of three of the largest telephone carriers in the United States: AT&T, Verizon, and BellSouth. All three companies were paid to provide the information to the NSA. It is speculated that the database contains over 1.9 trillion call-detail records of phone calls made after September 11, 2001. The database's existence prompted fierce objection from those who viewed it as a warrantless or illegal search – nevertheless, the collection of such third-party information has been authorized by the USA PATRIOT Act, and has been upheld by the courts.

===== US Foreign Intelligence Surveillance Court of Review =====
In a 2002 opinion entitled In re: Sealed Case No. 02-001, the United States Foreign Intelligence Surveillance Court of Review examined all the significant appellate decisions. The court noted all the Federal courts of appeal having looked at the issue had concluded that there was such constitutional power. Furthermore, if there was such power, "FISA could not encroach on the president's constitutional power", However, In Re Sealed Case "[took] for granted" that these cases are correct:

The Truong court, as did all the other courts to have decided the issue, held that the President did have inherent authority to conduct warrantless searches to obtain foreign intelligence information. It was incumbent upon the court, therefore, to determine the boundaries of that constitutional authority in the case before it. We take for granted that the President does have that authority and, assuming that is so, FISA could not encroach on the President's constitutional power ... ... Even without taking into account the President's inherent constitutional authority to conduct warrantless foreign intelligence surveillance, we think the procedures and government showings required under FISA, if they do not meet the minimum Fourth Amendment warrant standards, certainly come close. We, therefore, believe firmly, applying the balancing test drawn from Keith, that FISA as amended is constitutional because the surveillances it authorizes are reasonable.

The "balancing test drawn from Keith" is a reference to United States v. U.S. District Court, in which the Supreme Court of the United States established a legal test to determine whether the primary use of the warrantless search was to collect foreign intelligence, as per presidential authority, or whether that primary use is to gather evidence for use in a criminal trial.

=== Trump administration ===
The administration detained Mahmoud Khalil without a warrant.

In March 2025, United States Attorney General Pam Bondi issued a memo, "Guidance For Implementing The Alien Enemies Act", which said:

officers in the field are authorized to apprehend aliens upon a reasonable belief that the alien meets all four requirements to be validated as an Alien Enemy. This authority includes entering an Alien Enemy's residence to make an AEA apprehension where circumstances render it impracticable to first obtain a signed Notice and Warrant of Apprehension and Removal

According to USA Today, "Those administrative warrants are signed by immigration officers, not judges like criminal warrants."

A memo signed by Todd Lyons, dated May 2025, advised that immigration agents could enter a home with an administrative warrant. Administrative warrant are signed by immigration judges within the executive branch rather than a judicial branch judge.

In December, 2025, ICE agents began conducting a series of raids and sweeps as part of Operation Metro Surge, which were quickly noted for their reliance on warrantless searches and arrests. These raids continued into February, 2026.

In January, 2026, an internal DHS memo was leaked which asserted that Immigration and Customs Enforcement (ICE) officers did not need to apply for special warrants to forcibly enter private residences in order to detain individuals. The memo was dated May 12, 2025 and signed by then acting Director of ICE, Todd Lyons. According to the anonymous whistleblower who shared the document with media, the memo had not been shared widely within ICE but had been used to guide training for new ICE officers. The memo's dictate asserted that ICE officers did not need to request specific warrants for each home entry, instead they would be legally covered by general administrative warrants.

In February 2026, Lyons signed a memo arguing that the ability to arrest if there is a likelihood that the subject will escape is "not specifically defined" and that "an alien is "likely to escape" if an immigration office determines he or she is unlikely to be located at the scene of the encounter or another clearly identifiable location once an administrative warrant is obtained".

In April 2026, the a collection of organisations headed by the ACLU filed suite against DHS, ICE, and the Federal Law Enforcement Training Center on behalf of the immigrants and U.S. Citizens who have been targeted by the policy laid out in the leaked memo.

== Exceptions to the search warrant requirement ==
The warrant requirement of the Fourth Amendment is not absolute, and a number of exceptions to that requirement have been recognized by the courts, based upon such factors as whether it is reasonable under the circumstances for officers to obtain a warrant, and whether evidence might be lost or destroyed before a warrant can be obtained.

Common exceptions include:

- Administrative searches: Routine administrative searches;
- Border search: The person or property of a person is searched when they attempt to enter the United States from a foreign nation or territory;
- Consent: The person who is searched, or who is in control of property that is searched, agrees to the search;
- Exigent circumstances: A pressing need to act without delay;
- Inventory search: A search is conducted of items taken into police custody pursuant to a formal policy;
- Plain feel: Contraband or evidence of criminal activity can be recognized through a suspect's clothing during a lawful pat down;
- Plain view: Evidence of criminal activity can be observed by a police officer from a lawful vantage point;
- Probation search: A person on probation may be required to consent to searches of their person, property and home as a condition of probation;
- Safety checks: Entry is made into premises to ensure that people inside are not in danger or in need of medical assistance, with evidence of criminal activity observed incidentally to the safety check; and
- Search incident to arrest: A suspect and the suspect's immediate surroundings are searched at the time the suspect is arrested.

== See also ==
- Administrative subpoena
- NSA warrantless surveillance controversy
- Signing statement
- Imperial presidency
- ECHELON
- Information Awareness Office
- Foreign Intelligence Surveillance Act
- Unitary executive theory
- Cabinet noir
- Executive Order 2604 – Woodrow Wilson (text)
- Executive Order 12036 – Jimmy Carter (text)
- Executive Order 12139 – Jimmy Carter (text)
- Executive Order 12949 – Bill Clinton (text)
- Minimally-intrusive warrantless search
- United States v. Davis (2014)
- Special needs exception
