= Scialabba v. Cuellar de Osorio =

- Supreme Court of the United States

Argued December 10, 2013 Decided June 9, 2014
- Full case name: Lori Scialabba, Acting Director, United States Citizenship and Immigration Services, et al., Petitioners v. Rosalina Cuellar de Osorio, et al.
- Docket no.: 12-930
- Citations: 573 U.S. 41 (more) 134 S. Ct. 2191; 189 L. Ed. 2d 98

Case history
- Prior: Motion to dismiss granted, Zhang v. Napolitano, 663 F. Supp. 2d 913 (C.D. Cal. 2009); affirmed sub. nom., Cuellar de Osorio v. Mayorkas, 656 F.3d 954 (9th Cir. 2011); reversed on rehearing en banc, 695 F.3d 1003 (9th Cir. 2012); cert. granted, 570 U.S. 916 (2013).

Holding
- Lawful residents in the United States who turned twenty-one while their visa applications were being processed could not retain their original application date after "aging out" of eligibility for child-visas.

Court membership
- Chief Justice John Roberts Associate Justices Antonin Scalia · Anthony Kennedy; Clarence Thomas · Ruth Bader Ginsburg; Stephen Breyer · Samuel Alito; Sonia Sotomayor · Elena Kagan

Case opinions
- Majority: Kagan, joined by Kennedy, Ginsburg
- Concurrence: Roberts (in judgment), joined by Scalia
- Dissent: Alito
- Dissent: Sotomayor, joined by Breyer; Thomas (except footnote 3)

Scialabba v. Cuellar de Osorio, 573 U.S. 41 (2014), was a United States Supreme Court case in which the court held that lawful residents in the United States who turned twenty-one while their visa applications were being processed could not retain their original application date after "aging out" of eligibility for child-visas. Those "aged out" were moved to the bottom of the list of applicants for adult visas. The Ninth Circuit Court had originally agreed that provisions in the Child Status Protection Act allowed applicants to retain their date.
