= Innovation Act =

Innovation Act of the 113th Congress
- Long title: To amend title 35, United States Code, and the Leahy–Smith America Invents Act to make improvements and technical corrections, and for other purposes.
- Announced in: the 113th United States Congress
- Sponsored by: Rep. Bob Goodlatte (R, VA-6)
- Number of co-sponsors: 16

Citations
- Statutes at Large: United States patent law

Codification
- Acts affected: Leahy–Smith America Invents Act, Patent Law Treaties Implementation Act of 2012, Drug Price Competition and Patent Term Restoration Act of 1984
- U.S.C. sections affected: 35 U.S.C. § 290, 35 U.S.C. § 281A, 35 U.S.C. ch. 29, 35 U.S.C. § 154, 35 U.S.C. § 299A, and others.
- Agencies affected: Government Accountability Office, Supreme Court of the United States, United States Department of Commerce, United States Department of the Treasury, U.S. Securities and Exchange Commission, United States Patent and Trademark Office, Judicial Conference of the United States, United States Court of Federal Claims, Patent Trial and Appeal Board

Legislative history
- Introduced in the House as H.R. 3309 by Rep. Bob Goodlatte (R, VA-6) on October 23, 2013; Committee consideration by United States House Committee on the Judiciary

The Innovation Act of the 113th Congress (H.R. 3309) was a bill that would change the rules and regulations surrounding patent infringement lawsuits in an attempt to reduce patent lawsuits. The version of this bill in the 113th United States Congress was passed by the House on December 5, 2013, but was never passed by the United States Senate. Instead, the Senate responded with several bills, including the Patent Transparency and Improvements Act (S. 1720); in December 2013, the full Senate Judiciary Committee held a hearing on the topic.

In April 2014, the U.S. Supreme Court decided Octane Fitness, LLC v. ICON Health & Fitness, Inc., which shifted lawyer's fees for "frivolous" patent suits to the plaintiff, reducing the incentive to file illegitimate suits in the hope of inducing a settlement. In May 2014, Senator Patrick Leahy, the Chairman of the Senate Judiciary Committee, announced he was "taking the patent bill off [their] agenda" due to a failure of the House and Senate to "combat the scourge of patent trolls on our economy without burdening the companies and universities who rely on the patent system every day."

The bill was reintroduced in the 114th United States Congress in February 2015 by its original sponsor, Rep. Bob Goodlatte (R, VA-6), as the Innovation Act of the 114th Congress (H.R. 9). That bill would have changed the rules and regulations surrounding patent infringement lawsuits in an attempt to reduce enforceability of patents. It was sent to the House on June 11, 2015 but was not voted by the House or the Senate.

== Innovation Act of the 113th Congress ==
=== Background ===
In 2013, patent litigation had significantly increased since 2011, when the Leahy–Smith America Invents Act—the most recent patent law—was passed. The litigation moved from targeting mostly tech companies to targeting restaurants, grocery stores, and other businesses in non-tech industries, building additional support for a new law.

The law allowed patent owners to file complaints that specify what products they think infringe their patents or fail to identify specifically which claims from their patents they are asserting. The revelation of such details can be delayed until the discovery phase, which is often expensive. For example, the discovery stage of a single patent case against SAS Institute required the company to produce over 10 million documents, costing the defendant over 1.5 million dollars; the plaintiff ended up identifying fewer than 2000 documents as evidence, and lost by summary judgment.

Patent owners could sue customers and other end-users using a product that the plaintiff claimed violates their patent, sometimes before or in lieu of the company making the product. Examples include the following:

- Patent holder Lodsys targeted users of mobile application development software who were using in-app upgrade features provided by software development kits from Apple and Google.
- MPHJ Technology, which claims to own technology for scanning documents to email, demanded companies using that feature pay nearly $1,000 per employee for using it
- Innovatio, the holder of a patent claimed to be Wi-Fi-related, targeted coffee shops and hotels offering guests Wi-Fi access.
- Personal Audio demanded license payments from podcasters such as Marc Maron who used commercial off-the-shelf software to distribute their podcasts.

=== Provisions of the bill ===
The bill would create additional requirements as part of the legal process associated with patent infringement under United States law. One requirement would be for the plaintiffs filing the lawsuit to be more specific about the alleged violation, making it harder for them to file a vague claim of infringement.

The bill would require "a party alleging infringement in a civil action involving a claim for relief arising under any Act of Congress relating to patents to include in the court pleadings, unless the information is not reasonably accessible, specified details concerning: (1) each claim of each patent allegedly infringed, including each accused apparatus, feature, function, method, service, or other accused instrumentality; (2) the person alleged to be the direct infringer for each claim alleged to have been infringed indirectly; (3) the principal business of the party alleging infringement; (4) each complaint filed that asserts any of the same patents; and (5) whether the patent has been declared essential, potentially essential, or having potential to become essential to any standard-setting body as well as whether the United States or a foreign government has imposed any specific licensing requirements."

The bill would also require plaintiffs that lose their suit to pay the costs incurred by the winning defendant.

=== Congressional Budget Office report ===
This summary is provided by the Congressional Budget Office, as ordered reported by the House Committee on the Judiciary on November 20, 2013. This is a public domain source.

The Congressional Budget Office (CBO) estimates that implementing H.R. 3309 would cost $3 million over the 2014–2018 period, assuming appropriation of the necessary amounts, mainly for reports to be prepared by the Administrative Office of the United States Courts (AOUSC) and the Government Accountability Office and administrative costs incurred by the AOUSC associated with new judicial procedures. Pay-as-you-go procedures do not apply to this legislation because it would not affect direct spending or revenues.

Based on information from the Patent and Trademark Office (PTO), the CBO also estimates that implementing H.R. 3309 would have a gross cost to the PTO of about $30 million per year. However, the PTO is authorized to collect fees sufficient to offset its operating expenses; therefore, the CBO estimates that the net budgetary effect of PTO's activities undertaken to implement H.R. 3309 would not be significant, assuming appropriation actions consistent with the agency's authorities.

H.R. 3309 would change administrative and judicial processes that support the protection of intellectual property rights. The CBO expects that, by requiring inventors to be more specific in pleadings to the court, awarding attorney fees to the prevailing party, and limiting discovery early in an infringement proceeding, the bill would affect the decisions of inventors to initiate lawsuits for patent infringement.

H.R. 3309 would make several adjustments to judicial procedures for patent infringement cases, including which parties may join a suit and when a court is required to grant a motion to stay an action. Further, the bill would require the courts to award the prevailing party reasonable fees and other expenses incurred in connection with such cases. The bill also would require the AOUSC to develop rules and procedures related to the discovery of evidence in lawsuits for patent infringement.

The bill would change procedures that the PTO has in place to examine patent applications, award patents, and determine the validity of a patent that has already been granted. Among other things, H.R. 3309 would specify that the agency use methods similar to those used in district courts to evaluate the validity of a patent. The bill also would require the agency to develop new databases to make information about patent ownership and litigation available on its website, perform an additional review of certain declarations made on original applications, and prepare several studies and reports on patent ownership and the behavior of certain patent owners.

H.R. 3309 would impose a mandate as defined in the Unfunded Mandates Reform Act (UMRA) on both public and private entities because the PTO would charge fees to offset the costs incurred to collect and make some information related to patents publicly available. Other provisions in the bill also would result in increased patent fees. The requirement to pay those fees would be a mandate because the federal government controls the patent and trademark system, and no reasonable alternatives to that system exist.

Based on information from PTO, the CBO estimates that the annual cost to comply with the mandate would be about $30 million, with less than $1 million of those costs accruing to public entities and the rest accruing to private entities. Therefore, the cost for public and private entities to comply with the mandate would fall below the annual thresholds established in UMRA for intergovernmental and private-sector mandates ($75 million and $150 million in 2013, respectively, adjusted annually for inflation).

=== Procedural history ===
The Innovation Act was introduced into the United States House of Representatives on October 23, 2013, by Rep. Goodlatte. It was referred to the United States House Committee on the Judiciary. The Committee held hearings about the bill on October 29, 2013 and markedup the bill on November 20, 2013. The Committee voted 33–5 on November 20, 2013 to report the bill. It was reported (amended) by the Committee on the Judiciary on December 2, 2013 alongside House Committee Report 113-279. On November 27, 2013, House Majority Leader Eric Cantor announced the H.R. 3309 would be considered on the House floor on December 4 or 5, 2013. On December 5, 2013 the House voted in Roll Call Vote 629 to pass the bill 325–91. Both House Republicans and House Democrats disagreed internally on the issue. Republicans voted 195 in favor and 27 against, while Democrats voted 130 in favor and 64 against.

President Barack Obama indicated his support for the bill.

=== Debate and discussion ===
The bill had sixteen co-sponsors in the House.

Supporters of the bill argued that the frivolous lawsuits filled by patent trolls hurt the economy. Rep. Goodlatte said that "The tens of billions of dollars spent on settlements and litigation expenses associated with abusive patent suits represent truly wasted capital." The Electronic Frontier Foundation (EFF) was among the supporters of the bill, saying "It gives defendants tools to fight back, makes litigation cheaper and includes an important fee-shifting provision, so companies that stand up to the trolls have a chance to recover their fees and costs at the end of litigation. It requires trolls to make their case up front by providing basic information about their patents and the supposed infringement. And it prohibits trolls from hiding behind shell companies."

Opponents of the bill argued that the law would hurt smaller inventors that are trying to defend their patents from larger companies with more money to spend on legal action.

There were 91 House members who voted against the bill, four of whom were Democratic members of the Subcommittee on Courts, Intellectual Property and the Internet. Those four, joined by a fifth Democratic member of the Committee on the Judiciary supplied dissenting views.

The EFF had some issues with the version passed by the House, saying "It doesn't go nearly far enough to reform the demand letter problem. Its provisions protecting consumers and end-users, while present, aren't as robust as we would hope. And it dropped expanded covered business method review, a provision that would have helped ensure that the Patent Office issues fewer patents for "inventions" that aren't particularly inventive.

In February 2015 the Association of Public and Land-grant Universities published a press release and an open letter to the senior members of the House and Senate Committees on the Judiciary, documenting their objections:

The provisions with the most potential for damaging university technology transfer include fee-shifting and joinder. Most universities, non-profit technology transfer organizations, and their licensees — often small businesses and start-ups— lack extensive resources to enforce their patents. The heightened litigation risks created by the fee-shifting and joinder provisions in the Innovation Act would devalue patents, creating uncertainty that would undermine the incentives of potential licensees and venture capitalists to invest in commercialization of university innovation.

=== Dissenting views ===
Five Democrats provided dissenting views: John Conyers (MI), Sheila Jackson Lee (TX), Hank Johnson (GA), Bobby Scott (VA), and Mel Watt (NC).

They "believe that any serious reform of the patent laws" must end fee diversion "to ensure adequate hiring, proper training of examiners, and sustained patent quality"; they also believe H.R.3309 "creates an imbalance in the patent system skewed in favor of big corporate interests, negatively impact all patent owners thereby undermining innovation, and would encroach on our longstanding deference to the prerogatives of the Judiciary." They wanted provisions "concerning real parties in interest, customer stays, and small business assistance" as well as a "revolving fund to end fee diversion", a "study on the practice of deceptive demand letters and a report with tailored recommendations on changes to laws and regulations that would deter the use of those letters."

=== Senate actions ===
On November 18, 2013, Senator Patrick Leahy, the Chairman of the Senate Committee on the Judiciary introduced the Patent Transparency and Improvements Act (S. 1720), the first of several Senate bills written in response to the Innovation Act.

On December 17, 2013, the full Senate Judiciary Committee held a hearing entitled "Protecting Small Businesses and Promoting Innovation by Limiting Patent Troll Abuse."

In May 2014, Senator Patrick Leahy, the Chairman of the Senate Committee on the Judiciary, announced he was "taking the patent bill off the Senate Judiciary Committee agenda." According to Leahy:

Unfortunately, there has been no agreement on how to combat the scourge of patent trolls on our economy without burdening the companies and universities who rely on the patent system every day to protect their inventions. We have heard repeated concerns that the House-passed bill went beyond the scope of addressing patent trolls, and would have severe unintended consequences on legitimate patent holders who employ thousands of Americans.

== Innovation Act of the 114th Congress ==
Innovation Act of the 114th Congress
- Long title: To amend title 35, United States Code, and the Leahy–Smith America Invents Act to make improvements and technical corrections, and for other purposes.
- Announced in: the 114th United States Congress
- Sponsored by: Rep. Bob Goodlatte (R, VA-6)
- Number of co-sponsors: 26

Citations
- Statutes at Large: United States patent law

Codification
- Acts affected: Leahy–Smith America Invents Act, Patent Law Treaties Implementation Act of 2012, Drug Price Competition and Patent Term Restoration Act of 1984
- U.S.C. sections affected: 35 U.S.C. § 290, 35 U.S.C. § 281A, 35 U.S.C. ch. 29, 35 U.S.C. § 154, 35 U.S.C. § 299A, and others.
- Agencies affected: Government Accountability Office, Supreme Court of the United States, United States Department of Commerce, United States Department of the Treasury, U.S. Securities and Exchange Commission, United States Patent and Trademark Office, Judicial Conference of the United States, United States Court of Federal Claims, Patent Trial and Appeal Board

Legislative history
- Introduced in the House as H.R. 9 by Rep. Bob Goodlatte (R, VA-6) on February 5, 2015; Committee consideration by United States House Committee on the Judiciary

=== Background ===
Patent litigation had significantly decreased since 2013, when the previous bill was introduced. Patent litigation has since been reported as primarily initiated by manufacturers, reducing support for a new patent law.

Current law allows universities, small tech startup and other patent owners to file complaints that specify what products they think infringe their patents. A letter sent by the Association of American Universities to Rep. Goodlatte asserts that H.R. 9 would:

make it more difficult and expensive for patent holders to defend their rights in good faith.

In addition, the National Venture Capital Association has stated opposition to H.R. 9 as making it:

harder for startups to enforce their patent rights against entrenched competitors or to defend themselves in patent cases brought by those competitors or even by larger Non-Practicing Entities" ... "making it more difficult to invest in patent-reliant startups" "that would pose a threat of the entrepreneurial ecosystem.

Nonetheless, the bill would require "a party alleging infringement in a civil action involving a claim for relief arising under any Act of Congress relating to patents to include in the court pleadings, unless the information is not reasonably accessible, specified details concerning: (1) each claim of each patent allegedly infringed (2) for each claim of indirect infringement, the acts of the alleged indirect infringer that contribute to, or are inducing, a direct infringement (3) the principal business of the party alleging infringement (4) the authority of the party alleging infringement to assert each patent and the grounds for the court's jurisdiction (5) each complaint filed that asserts any of the same patents (6) and whether the patent is essential or has potential to become essential to a standard-setting body, as well as whether the United States or a foreign government has imposed any specific licensing requirements."

The bill would also require plaintiffs that lose their suit to pay the costs incurred by the winning defendant.

=== Procedural history ===
The Innovation Act was introduced into the United States House of Representatives on February 5, 2015 by Rep. Goodlatte. It was referred to the United States House Committee on the Judiciary.

Opponents of the bill argued that the law would hurt smaller inventors that are trying to defend their patents from larger companies with more money to spend on legal action. In February 2015 the Association of Public and Land-grant Universities published a press release and an open letter to the senior members of the House and Senate Committees on the Judiciary, documenting their objections.

=== Dissenting views in Congress ===
6 former supporters of H.R. 9 on the House Judiciary Committee have dropped their support for H.R. 9, four Republican and 2 Democrats. In addition, two other Democrats on the committee who voted for the failed Innovation Act in the 113th Congress who now oppose H.R. 9 sent out a 'dear colleague' letter in early July 2015 urging others to defect. They cited a slew of Supreme Court cases on patents that have changed precedent as well as changes at the U.S. Patent and Trademark Office stating:.

The patent landscape has changed dramatically in the past two years, and the changes (of the America Invents Act of 2011) are working to eliminate the need for the sweeping changes proposed in H.R. 9.

=== Senate actions ===
On April 29, 2015, Senator Charles Grassley, the Chairman of the Senate Committee on the Judiciary introduced the Patent Act (S. 1137) in response to the Innovation Act. On May 7, 2015, the full Senate Judiciary Committee held a hearing that included testimony by Kevin H. Rhodes (V.P. and Chief Intellectual Property Counsel on behalf of the Coalition for 21st Century Patent Reform) proposing that the standard of review for the validity of patents in Inter Partes Review (IPR) at the Patent Trial and Appeal Board (PTAB) be changed from "preponderance of evidence" to "clear and convincing evidence" as consistent with federal courts. Many policy observers have called for drastic changes to the PTAB IPR procedure as a result of studies that show in 73 percent of IPR petitions, all of the claims were deemed unpatentable, and in additional 15 of IPR petitions, some of the claims were deemed unpatentable." The proposed amendments were made amid growing concern by ethical drug companies about the high rate of invalidation of patents by the PTAB in IPR. and comments by the Judge Rader, the former Chief Justice of the Federal Circuit that the PTAB is the "death squad" of patents.

== See also ==
- Markman hearing
- Patent infringement under United States law
- Patent troll
- List of bills in the 113th United States Congress
- List of bills in the 114th United States Congress
