= Nicole Shanahan =

American entrepreneur and attorney (born 1985)

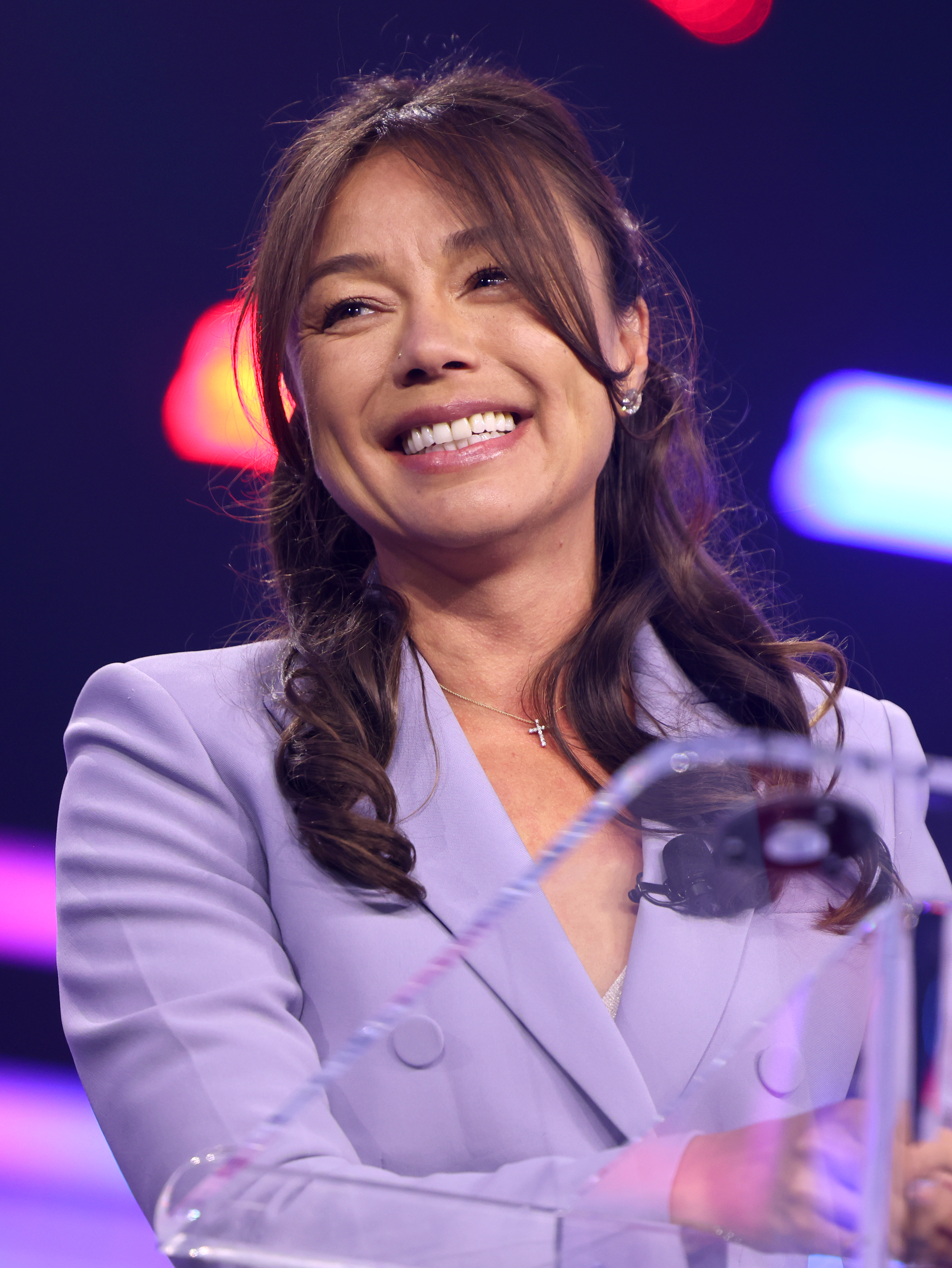
- Shanahan in 2024
- Born: Nicole Ann Shanahan; September 26, 1985 (age 41); Placer County, California, U.S.
- Education: University of Puget Sound (BA); Santa Clara University (JD)
- Occupations: Attorney; entrepreneur; philanthropist; activist
- Political party: Independent (2024–present)
- Other political affiliations: Democratic (before 2024)
- Spouses: Jeremy Kranz (m. 2014; div. 2015); Sergey Brin (m. 2018; div. 2023)
- Children: 1

Nicole Ann Shanahan (born September 26, 1985) is an American attorney and entrepreneur. She was the running mate of Robert F. Kennedy Jr. in his campaign in the 2024 U.S. presidential election.

Born in California, Shanahan graduated from the University of Puget Sound and the Santa Clara University School of Law. Before law school, she worked as a paralegal and then as a patent specialist at the defensive patent aggregator RPX Corp. She was a fellow at Stanford Law School's CodeX, Stanford Center for Legal Informatics.

Shanahan married Google co-founder Sergey Brin in 2018; they separated in 2021 and divorced in 2023. She reportedly has a net worth of over $1 billion, primarily as a result of her marriage to Brin. In 2019, she established a private foundation, Bia-Echo, that promotes research to lengthen the human reproductive lifespan.

In March 2024, Kennedy named Shanahan as his running mate in his presidential campaign. Shanahan has questioned the scientific consensus on vaccine safety and efficacy.

== Early life ==
Nicole Ann Shanahan was born to Shawn and Amy Shanahan (née Wong) in Placer County, California, on September 26, 1985. She grew up in Oakland, California. In a 2023 interview, she said she had a "very hard" childhood marked by traumatic experiences and poverty. Shanahan said her father, a computer specialist of German and Irish descent who died in 2014, had bipolar disorder, schizophrenia, and depression, and struggled with substance abuse. Shanahan's mother was born in China and immigrated to the U.S. from Guangzhou in the 1980s; she worked as a maid before becoming an accountant. Shanahan has a younger brother.

Shanahan attended Saint Mary's College High School, a private Catholic school in Berkeley, California. She then moved to Tacoma, Washington, where she earned a bachelor's degree from the University of Puget Sound in 2007. At the university, she studied Asian studies, economics, and Mandarin Chinese. Shanahan worked as a paralegal and patent specialist (the latter at defensive patent aggregator RPX Corp.) before attending Santa Clara University School of Law, from which she graduated with a J.D. in 2014. She has said that while working at RPX Corp. one of her male co-workers sexually assaulted her, and that shortly after this she became severely depressed and left RPX Corp. a month before its IPO.

== Career ==
While in law school, Shanahan was an exchange student at National University of Singapore. She became interested in patent law as a law student; after becoming a lawyer, she founded a Palo Alto-based legal tech company, ClearAccessIP, and was its CEO. She sold the company to a competitor, IPwe, in 2020, in exchange for an estimated $20 million in IPwe stock; IPwe went bankrupt in 2024.

Shanahan has spoken about the impact of artificial intelligence (AI) on law and the legal profession. She was a fellow at Stanford Law School's CodeX, Stanford Center for Legal Informatics.

Shanahan served as executive producer for the films Kiss The Ground and Evolver.

Shanahan is a member of the board of Carbon Royalty Corp. She invested in Linus Biotechnology, Inc. (LinusBio), a biotech firm, during a venture funding round in January 2023. Also in 2023, she joined the board of Extreme Tech Challenge. She is the "Global Joy Officer" and a member of the board at the Sloomoo Institute.

== Bia-Echo and advocacy ==
In 2018, Shanahan helped fund and launch the Center for Female Reproductive Longevity and Equality within the Buck Institute for Research on Aging.

In 2019, she established her private foundation, Bia-Echo. It is named after Bia, the ancient Greek goddess associated with energy. According to financial disclosure documents over a three-year period, Bia-Echo's sole donor was Shanahan's then-husband, Sergey Brin. Before their divorce, Brin donated more than $20 million to Bia-Echo, much of it from shares of Alphabet (Google's parent company). He made another contribution to the foundation in 2021, but did not contribute in 2022. In 2022, the Bia-Echo Foundation reported owning $13.7 million in government securities and $12.2 million in stocks and bonds, and reported making $0 in grants or contributions to outside groups.

In 2019, Shanahan pledged to contribute $100 million through Bia-Echo over five years, mostly for "reproductive longevity" research, which aims to help women become pregnant later in life. (Note: Other stated aims of Bia-Echo include programs seeking to overhaul the criminal justice system and climate change, as well as programs on nutrition and its link to fertility.The Bia-Echo Foundation was one of several groups that provided funding for the White House Task Force on Hunger, Nutrition, and Health, in advance of a 2022 report by the task force. The foundation also supported a daylong conference of experts in November 2022, in Boston, sponsored by Tufts University's Friedman School of Nutrition Science and Policy and the school's Food and Nutrition Innovation Institute, "to explore the state of the evidence and evidence gaps regarding the relationships between food, nutrition, and fertility.") She has repeatedly criticized in vitro fertilization (calling IVF "one of the biggest lies that's being told about women's health today") and championed unconventional research that she believes might allow women to have children into their 50s (suggesting, for example, that exposure to sunlight might aid fertility).

In a 2023 interview, Shanahan said that finding a "cure to autism" was an additional focus of Bia-Echo, and estimated that she spent 60% of her time researching autism.

In 2022, Shanahan gave $70 million to Blue Meridian Partners, which makes grants to nonprofits that aim to help the impoverished.

== Political contributions and involvement before 2024 ==
In the 2010s and 2020s, Shanahan made various contributions to left-leaning organizations and Democratic political candidates, including Hillary Clinton's 2016 presidential campaign and Ro Khanna's congressional campaigns. In 2020, she was a "major donor" to Measure J, a criminal justice reform referendum in Los Angeles County. Also in 2020, she contributed $150,000 to support George Gascón's campaign for Los Angeles County District Attorney.

During the 2020 Democratic presidential primaries, Shanahan contributed $2,800 each to the campaigns of Marianne Williamson and Pete Buttigieg. She co-hosted a fundraiser for Buttigieg in December 2019, along with other wealthy Silicon Valley figures. After Joe Biden became the presumptive nominee, she supported his campaign, contributing $25,000 to the Biden Victory Fund, and a five-figure sum to the Democratic National Committee.

== Role in Robert F. Kennedy Jr. presidential campaign ==
=== Early role in campaign ===
In May 2023, when Robert F. Kennedy Jr. was running for the 2024 Democratic presidential nomination, Shanahan donated the maximum of $6,600 to his campaign. After Kennedy dropped out of the Democratic primaries in October 2023, announcing that he would run in the general election as an independent candidate, Shanahan said she was "incredibly disappointed" and would not support his candidacy. In early 2024, she reversed course, and resumed backing Kennedy. Through Planeta Management LLC, Shanahan donated $4 million to a super PAC to pay for a 30-second television Super Bowl ad, aired during Super Bowl LVIII, supporting the campaign. In addition to funding the ad, Shanahan was also a "creative force" behind it, the total cost of which was variously said to be $5 million or (according to the super PAC's co-founder) $7 million. Kennedy said that his campaign was not directly involved with the ad, as coordination between independent expenditure groups and campaigns is illegal. Shanahan separately donated (also through Planeta Management LLC) half a million dollars to a different super PAC supporting Kennedy's campaign.

=== Vice-presidential running mate ===
In March 2024, Kennedy's campaign manager and daughter-in-law, Amaryllis Fox Kennedy, confirmed that Shanahan was on the candidate's "short list" of potential running mates. The campaign also considered Aaron Rodgers and Jesse Ventura. On March 26, 2024, Kennedy formally announced Shanahan as his selection for vice president during a campaign event in Oakland, California. Shanahan left the Democratic Party when she joined the ticket. Her ability to bankroll the Kennedy campaign was seen as an advantage.

Shanahan was the richest candidate for vice president in at least 50 years, with a net worth possibly in the hundreds of millions of dollars. She gave almost $19 million on the Kennedy/Shanahan campaign, a small portion of her wealth. (Note: This included $2 million that Shanahan donated the day after her selection was announced, she donated $2 million to the campaign, boosting its in various states; $8 million more to the campaign in May 2024, and a further $2.5 million in June 2024.) Shanahan was among the top self-funded candidates of the 2024 election cycle (although she spent less than David Trone, who spent over $60 million on the Democratic Senate primary in Maryland). Despite Shanahan's contributions, the campaign continued to struggle with fundraising, and its expenditures were greater than contributions.

By the time Kennedy dropped out of the race in August 2024, the Kennedy/Shanahan campaign had gained ballot access in only 16 of the 50 states (representing 140 of the 538 electoral votes). The Kennedy campaign's efforts to get on the ballot in key states was supported by Republican megadonors and dark money organizations. In some states, the campaign pursued unconventional strategies to get on the ballot, such as forming new political parties or partnering with existing minor parties. For example, the Libertarian Party of Colorado attempted to give its ballot line to Kennedy and Shanahan (displacing the national Libertarian Party ticket of Chase Oliver and Mike ter Maat), but this effort was unsuccessful.

During their campaign, Shanahan and Kennedy expressed divergent views. Shanahan expressed support for banning abortion "between 15 and 18 weeks" while a Kennedy spokesman said "he believes the cutoff should be at fetal viability." In May 2024, Shanahan suggested that the campaign was intended to force a contingent election in the House of Representatives, (Note: In U.S. presidential elections, if no candidate receives a majority of electoral votes, a contingent election occurs, with the winner chosen by the House).) a suggestion Kennedy disavowed.

Shanahan rarely appeared at campaign events and infrequently gave interviews to mainstream outlets. Her first solo appearance on the campaign trail was a month and a half after Kennedy named her as his running mate.

On August 20, 2024, Shanahan said in an interview with podcast host Tom Bilyeu that the Kennedy campaign had discussions with the Trump campaign, and that she and Kennedy were considering whether to drop out of the race and "join forces with" Trump. She suggested that the campaign had no realistic prospect of winning the general election; that "we draw votes from Trump"; and that if Kennedy remained in the race, it would "run the risk of" aiding Kamala Harris. Kennedy and Shanahan suspended their campaign two days later and endorsed Trump.

On August 27, 2024, Chris Cuomo interviewed Shanahan on NewsNation regarding Kennedy's endorsement of Trump. Shanahan specifically stated that she is not a Harris Democrat or a Trump Republican.

In October 2024, The Washington Post reported that Shanahan attempted to bribe a journalist from the same newspaper with US$500,000 to reveal the sources of a profile story on her.

=== Political views ===
In interviews in 2024, Shanahan said she is "not an anti-vaxxer" but expressed support for Kennedy's anti-vaccine advocacy and questioned the scientific consensus on their safety and efficacy. After being selected as Kennedy's running mate, she referenced discredited anti-vaccine claims, and implied that childhood vaccines contribute to autism, a debunked notion that Kennedy has promoted for years. On X (formerly Twitter), she promoted COVID-19 vaccine misinformation, asserting that the vaccines are unsafe.

Shanahan believes that "electromagnetic pollution" from mobile phones and other devices are contributing to an "epidemic of chronic disease" and that Kennedy was the only presidential candidate who "takes the chronic disease epidemic seriously". She criticized the Biden administration for lending military aid to Ukraine. She named the libertarian Republican U.S. Representative Thomas Massie as one of her "favorite" members of Congress.

On January 28, 2025, Shanahan released a video on X where she threatened political retribution against any senator, Democrat or Republican, who did not vote to confirm her former presidential running mate Robert F. Kennedy Jr. as Secretary of the Department of Health and Human Services. Shanahan specifically called out Republican senators Mitch McConnell and Lisa Murkowski, Democratic senators Jon Ossoff and Raphael Warnock of Georgia, and independent senator Bernie Sanders. In the video, Shanahan vowed that "I will personally fund challengers to primary you in your next election, and I will enlist hundreds of thousands to join me."

== Personal life ==
In 2014, Shanahan married Jeremy Asher Kranz, a San Francisco Bay Area investor and finance executive. They had dated since 2011. Weeks before their marriage, she began an affair with Sergey Brin, a co-founder of Google, which Kranz discovered from texts on her phone. Kranz and Shanahan divorced in 2015. Shanahan had met Brin at a yoga festival in Lake Tahoe in 2014; they married in 2018. They have a daughter together, born in 2018. Brin and Shanahan maintained an estate at Point Dume in Malibu, California, purchased in 2020.

Shanahan and Brin's daughter was diagnosed with autism in 2020. In 2022, Shanahan sought the advice of Dr. Jack Kruse, a neurosurgeon turned paleo-diet advocate and wellness guru. Kruse blamed Shanahan and Brin for their daughter's autism, claiming that it was because Shanahan allowed her infant to receive vaccines and be exposed to artificial light and electromagnetic radiation. Kruse also accused Brin of participating in a plot by the U.S. government and "Big Tech" to use blue light to control the population. Shanahan took his advice and modified her home to limit non-sun light, as well as Wi-Fi and cellular signals. She also converted her swimming pool to saltwater.

Shanahan and Brin separated in December 2021, and Brin filed for divorce in January 2022. In 2022, the Wall Street Journal reported that a reason for the breakup was a "brief affair" in 2021 between Shanahan and Elon Musk. Three people interviewed as part of a 2024 New York Times investigation said that Shanahan and Brin separated after Shanahan had a sexual encounter with Musk in 2021. Shanahan and Musk denied having had an affair. The Wall Street Journal said: "We are confident in our sourcing, and we stand by our reporting." Shanahan and Brin had signed a prenuptial agreement. During the divorce proceedings, Shanahan's attorneys argued that she had signed it under duress, and in mediation sought more than $1 billion of Brin's $95 billion fortune. The divorce was finalized in 2023 in a confidential arbitration. Forbes reported that Shanahan likely received around 2.6 million Alphabet Class B shares from Brin, worth $390 million in March 2024, and possibly an additional, equal amount of Class C shares. The New York Times, citing three people with knowledge of Shanahan's finances, reported she has a net worth over $1 billion, mainly as a result of her marriage to Brin.

In 2023, Shanahan held a "love ceremony" of commitment with Jacob Strumwasser, an advisor at Lightning Labs, a Bitcoin software company. She described the event as a handfasting ceremony influenced by Druidic tradition. The pair met at the Burning Man festival in 2022.

In 2025, Shanahan announced that she was leaving the Jewish faith and joining the Jews for Jesus. Shanahan converted to Judaism in 2014 while she was engaged to Jeremy Kranz, her first husband.
