= Rockstar Consortium =

Consortium formed to acquire patents

Rockstar Consortium Inc.
- Traded as: NASDAQ:SPEX Products list: [None]
- Industry: Patent monetization
- Key people: John Veschi (CEO)
- Website: www.ip-rockstar.com

Rockstar Consortium Inc., originally named Rockstar Bidco, is a consortium formed to negotiate licensing for patents acquired from the bankrupt multinational telecommunications and data networking equipment manufacturer Nortel. Members of the consortium are Apple, BlackBerry, Ericsson, Microsoft, and Sony. Rockstar is a patent holding non-practicing entity (NPE) and submitted the winning US$4.5 billion bid for the Nortel patents at a week-long auction held in New York in June 2011.

Spherix Incorporated, a company founded by Gilbert Levin, has acquired four families of mobile communication patents from the Rockstar Consortium in exchange for initial consideration of up-front cash and Spherix common stock. Rockstar will also receive a percentage of future profits from Spherix after recovery of patent monetization costs and an initial priority return on investment to Spherix.

In 2012, Business Insider listed Rockstar as number 3 on its list of the 8 most fearsome patent trolls in industry. Wired magazine notes that some call them a "straight-up patent troll".

In October 2013, Rockstar had initiated legal action against eight companies, including Google, Huawei and Samsung, as well as other makers of Android phones including Asustek, HTC, LG Electronics, Pantech, and ZTE.

In December 2013, Google initiated legal action against Rockstar, with a countersuit filed in San Jose, California.

In November 2014, it was reported that Rockstar and Google had come to a settlement.

In December 2014, Rockstar agreed to sell 4000 of its patents to RPX Corporation, a defensive patent aggregator.

== See also ==
- Smartphone wars
