= Defensive patent aggregation =

Business practice

Defensive patent aggregation (DPA) is the practice of purchasing patents or patent rights to keep such patents out of the hands of entities that would assert them against operating companies. The opposite is offensive patent aggregation (OPA) which is the purchasing of patents in order to assert them against companies that would use the inventions protected by such patents (operating companies) and to grant licenses to these operating companies in return for licensing fees or royalties. OPA can be practiced by operating companies or non-practicing entities (NPEs)

Operating companies must often defend themselves against claims of patent infringement. To prevent such litigations, operating companies sometimes purchase patents in technologies which they use or develop. Another motivation for operating companies to acquire patents is the ability to counter-assert such patents in case another operating company files a patent litigation. Operating companies have also pooled their efforts and financial resources to purchase patents.

In 2008, a new business model emerged with third-party financing doing defensive patent aggregation whereby a third-party – the aggregator – purchases the patents or patent rights strictly to mitigate the risk and cost of litigation associated with NPEs and provides licenses to members against a fixed annual membership fee.

Defensive patent aggregation has evolved to be more accurately described as the aggregation of defensive strategies from patent assertion. Current strategies include:

- Pro-active cross-licensing between patent holders so that any patents transferred to an NPE will be licensed already (see LOT Network)
- Group buying and licensing to obtain licenses for groups of companies (see AST and RPX)
- Pre-emptive patent challenges of patents held by NPEs (see Unified Patents)

== Rationale ==
In the United States, the cost of defending against a patent infringement suit, as of 2004, is typically $1 million or more before trial, and $4 million or more for a complete defense, even if successful. And, when non-litigation licensing and settlements are factored in, the actual costs of fighting patent lawsuits is much higher. Because the costs and risks are high, defendants may settle even non-meritorious suits they consider frivolous for several hundred thousand dollars. The uncertainty and unpredictability of the outcome of jury trials also encourages settlement.

In the first 10 months of 2008, more than 2,300 patent lawsuits were filed the United States. The majority of these cases are filed by the companies that created the patented invention. But a growing share of the lawsuits is coming from non-practicing entities (NPEs) – also called patent trolls – which acquire patents for the sole purpose of licensing and asserting their patent rights. In fact, NPE litigation grew from 2.6 percent of filed cases in 2000 to 16.6 percent of filed cases in 2007. Unlike product companies, known as operating companies in the IP commerce world, NPEs are not susceptible to counter-assertion by their licensing targets because they do not make or sell any products or services.

The NPE offense includes single inventor assertion firms, patent licensing and enforcement companies, litigation financiers and investors, and patent aggregators, both institutional and strategic. However, NPE offense is ultimately concentrated on asserting patents to the detriment of operating companies. NPE defense methods include defensive patent aggregation from companies including RPX Corporation, cooperative purchasing efforts, such as defensive patent pools and buying consortia, outright purchasing of patents, settlement and litigation.

== See also ==
- Allied Security Trust
- Intellectual Ventures
- PatentFreedom
- Patent troll
