= PatentFreedom =

PatentFreedom is an on-line community of companies that access and share information about non-practicing entities that own and enforce patents primarily to collect license fees. The company offers membership to operating companies as well as law firms representing them. The company was founded in May 2008.

Patent Freedom was acquired by RPX Corporation in June 2014.

== Products and services ==
PatentFreedom is a membership organization where members pay annual subscription fee to gain access to extensive information on non-practicing entities. Existing members can also contribute to the information about who are asserting patents. PatentFreedom subscriptions are offered to both companies and law firms. The information includes who the entities are, who is funding them, and who they have asserted their patents against.

The company has electronic dossiers on 680 entities, 2100 subsidiaries, holding more than 50,000 United States patents and applications, and involved in 8,900 litigations against 25,000 company counterparties.

PatentFreedom also provides advisory, risk mitigation and custom research services.

The company was founded in 2008, with 12 companies joining at inception.

== Executive Team ==
Dan McCurdy is the co-founder and chairman of PatentFreedom, and the CEO of Allied Security Trust. Chris Reohr is the co-founder and president of PatentFreedom.

== See also ==
- Coalition for Patent Fairness
- Nathan Myhrvold
- Patent Troll Tracker
