= Open Invention Network =

Patent non-aggression community

- Type: Limited liability company
- Industry: Intellectual property
- Founded: November 10, 2005; 21 years ago
- Headquarters: Durham, North Carolina, United States
- Key people: Keith Bergelt
- Services: Linux protection
- Website: www.openinventionnetwork.com

Open Invention Network (OIN) is an intellectual property rights company based in Durham, United States. It operates as an entity specialising in the acquisition of patents, subsequently granting royalty-free licenses to its community members. These members are obligated not to assert their own patents against Linux and its associated systems and applications as per the terms of the licensing agreements established by OIN.

== History ==
OIN was incorporated on 31 October 2005 and is headquartered in Durham, NC. The founding members, IBM, Novell, Philips, Red Hat, and Sony initiated the organisation on November 10 of the same year. Subsequently, NEC joined the consortium as a member. Notably, in December 2013, Google became a member, while Toyota announced its membership in July 2016. On October 10, 2018, Erich Andersen, representing Microsoft, disclosed their participation as a licensee. Canonical and TomTom hold associate membership status within the network. Keith Bergelt serves as the chief executive of the company. Prior to his role at OIN, Bergelt held the position of President and CEO of Paradox Capital, LLC As of November 2021, the membership of OIN comprised approximately 3,500 business licensees.

The list of applications considered by OIN, according to Red Hat's Mark Webbink, includes Apache, Eclipse, Evolution, Fedora Directory Server, Firefox, GIMP, GNOME, KDE, Mono, Mozilla, MySQL, Nautilus, OpenLDAP, OpenOffice.org, Open-Xchange, Perl, PostgreSQL, Python, Samba, SELinux, Sendmail, and Thunderbird.

There have been 10 updates, produced through a process of carefully maintaining a balance between stability and adding core open source technology, to the list of software components and packages covered by the Open Invention Network cross license. As of March 2022, more than 3,700 packages have been listed.

On March 26, 2007, Oracle licensed OIN's portfolio, thus agreeing not to assert patents against the Linux-based environment, including competitors MySQL and PostgreSQL when used as part of a Linux system. Oracle exercised a Limitation Election on March 29, 2012. On August 7, 2007, Google also joined OIN as a licensee. On October 2, 2007, Barracuda Networks joined OIN as a licensee. On March 23, 2009 TomTom joined OIN as a licensee. In May 2011, the European Open Source software manufacturer Univention joined OIN as a licensee.

In early September 2009, Open Invention Network acquired 30 patents, from Allied Security Trust, another defensive patent management organization, that had been acquired from Microsoft through a private auction. If the patents had been acquired by patent trolls, they might have caused financial obstacles to Linux developers, distributors and users. OIN was able to avert this issue with the patent acquisition.

On October 10, 2018, Microsoft joined the Open Invention Network community despite holding more than 60,000 patents.

On November 19, 2019, Open Invention Network announced that it was teaming with IBM, Microsoft and the Linux Foundation to further protect Linux and open source from Patent Assertion Entities (PAE), commonly called Patent Trolls. Together, the organizations are funding a multi-million dollar, multi-year initiative with Unified Patents' Open Source Zone. This expands OIN’s and its partners’ patent non-aggression activities by deterring PAEs from targeting Linux and adjacent OSS technologies relied on by developers, distributors and users.

Every 18 months to two years, Open Invention Network updates the list of software packages that it defines at its Linux System definition. In June 2024, Open Invention Network announced the 11th expansion of the definition, addressing more than 4,500 software packages and components.

As of June 2024, OIN has grown its community to more than 3,800 business participants, a compounded annual growth rate (CAGR) of more than 50%.

On June 22, 2010, OIN announced an Associate Member program and the recruitment of Canonical (previously an OIN licensee) as its first associate member. The announcement drew criticism from anti-software-patent activist and a European lobbyist Florian Müller, who had previously criticized the OIN for a lack of transparency and for defining arbitrarily the scope of the patent protection it offers. Florian Mueller's credibility in attacking OIN has been called into question due to his paid relationship with corporate sponsors.

On August 30, 2021, Xiaomi joined the Open Invention Network community.

== Linux defenders ==
OIN encourages practices that eliminate low-quality patents—the foodstuff of aggressive strategics and patent trolls. Specifically, OIN encourages the Linux and open source communities to become active in:

- Inter partes review is a procedure for challenging the validity of an issued patent owned by a third party. By challenging patents with IPRs, the Linux and broader open source community can help to eliminate them. Unified Patents has successfully invalidated a number of patents using Inter Partes Review.
- Third-Party Preissuance Submissions provide for challenging the validity of a patent application. They provide a mechanism for third parties to submit prior art of potential relevance to the United States Patent and Trademark Office during the examination of another party’s patent application. In this way, the Linux and broader open source community can help to eliminate patents, and particularly help to mitigate the issuance of new low-quality patents. A patent application challenger may remain unnamed or anonymous by asking a firm to complete the Third-Party Preissuance Submission on its behalf.
- Defensive publication, an intellectual property strategy used to prevent another party from obtaining a patent. The strategy consists in disclosing an enabling description and/or drawing of the product, apparatus, or method so that it enters the public domain and becomes prior art. Many defensive publications can be searched for free in IP.com’s Prior Art Database.

== See also ==
- Patent Commons Project
- Patent pool
- Software patent
- Software patent debate
- Software patents and free software
- Open-source software
- Free software
- Allied Security Trust
- RPX Corporation
- LOT Network
