= English rule (attorney's fees) =

Losing party pays both sides' legal costs

Attorney's fee rules by country: English rule: Loser is expected to pay winner's all reasonable fees English rule: Loser pays winner's attorney fees based on fixed schedule or percentage At judge's discretion: fees usually awarded at least partially At judge's discretion: fees usually not awarded American rule: Winners usually pay their own attorney fees

In the field of law and economics, the English rule is a rule controlling assessment of lawyers' fees arising out of litigation. The English rule provides that the party that loses in court pays the other party's legal costs. The English rule contrasts with the American rule, under which each party is generally responsible for paying its own attorney fees (unless a statute or contract provides otherwise).

Some argue that the American system encourages frivolous or "extortionate" suits against businesses with "deep pockets," because plaintiffs can have a contingency fee arrangement with the attorney whereby they pay nothing to the attorney if the case loses. Under a contingent fee arrangement, the attorney for the plaintiff faces no consequences, other than lost time and effort, for bringing a suit that loses, but he can collect huge fees (typically 30% to 40% of the damages awarded) if he wins. By the same token, wealthy defendants have a strong incentive to pay the plaintiff to get a settlement, if they face a small chance of having to pay a huge amount. The Manhattan Institute has argued that the American system is "expensive," "inefficient," and incentivizes nuisance and meritless lawsuits.

The rationale for the English rule is that a litigant (whether bringing a claim or defending a claim) is entitled to legal representation and, if successful, should not be left out of pocket by reason of their own legal fees. It should be borne in mind that, in virtually all English civil litigation, damages are merely compensatory.

The English rule is followed by nearly every Western democracy other than the United States, although there are specific exceptions when different rules apply.

== United States jurisdictions ==
In the United States the "American rule" is generally followed, each party bearing its own expense of litigation. However, 35 U.S.C. § 285 provides that in patent cases, the losing party may have to pay attorney fees of the winning party if the case is deemed "exceptional." However, after the U.S. Supreme Court's decision in Octane Fitness, LLC v. ICON Health & Fitness, Inc. on April 29, 2014, it is now easier for courts to award costs for frivolous patent lawsuits initiated by patent trolls.

Alaska has long been an exception to the U.S. pattern, where the English rule applies. A very limited version of the English rule was adopted in Texas during the 2011 legislative session that applies only to the filing of a baseless lawsuit. Tex. R. Civ. P. 91a. Then Texas governor Rick Perry called in his state of the state address for a one-way version of the English rule which would apply only to those who initiate a suit, the plaintiff.

== See also ==
- Costs in English law
- American rule (attorney's fees)
