= Keith Bergelt =

American businessman

- Born: September 11, 1958 (age 68); New York, NY
- Education: Duke University, AB 1979; Southern Methodist University Dedman School of Law, JD 1982; Theseus Institute – International Management Institute, MBA 1995
- Employer: Open Invention Network
- Title: CEO
- Website: Management at openinventionnetwork.com

Keith Daniel Bergelt (born September 11, 1958) is an American corporate executive and former U.S. diplomat. He is CEO of Open Invention Network where he is responsible for coordinating the establishment and maintenance of a (patents) no-fly zone around Linux. As such, he is responsible for safeguarding an open and competitive landscape in key technology markets such as back-office transaction processing, mission critical IT applications, mobile communications/smartphones, and desktop computing.

== Early life ==
Bergelt was born in New York City and was raised in the village of Bayville, New York on the North Shore of Long Island. He attended St. Boniface Martyr School in Sea Cliff, New York and is a graduate of Locust Valley High School. He was a high school classmate of Eileen Chamberlain Donahoe, U.S. Ambassador to the UN Human Rights Council in Geneva, Switzerland.

== Education ==
Bergelt holds degrees from Duke University’s Trinity College (AB), the Dedman School of Law at Southern Methodist University (JD), and Edhec Business School (Theseus MBA). In addition, he has studied management at INSEAD and Institut National des Telecommunications (INT) in France and economics and technology policy at University of San Francisco's McLaren Graduate School of Business.

== 1982-2000 ==
Upon graduation from law school, he entered public service and held diplomatic postings at the UN in New York City and the American Embassy in Tokyo, Japan. During his 12-year public service career he also lived in San Francisco, California and Washington, D.C. He was a colleague and tennis partner of U.S. Treasury Secretary Tim Geithner during their time together at the American Embassy in Tokyo in the early 1990s.

After the Berlin Wall fell in the wake of the collapse of the Soviet Union, Bergelt left government service and embarked on a private sector career in C-level strategy consulting focused on innovation at SRI Consulting in Menlo Park, CA. While at SRI Consulting, he co-founded the first strategy consulting practice in the area of intellectual asset management at a major strategy consulting firm. This practice enabled companies to develop strategies to more effectively build, manage and leverage the value of their codified (patents, trademarks, copyrights) and non-codified (knowledge, know-how, etc.) intellectual capital through licensing, joint ventures, donation, abandonment and the creation of spin-outs, spin-ups and spin-ins uniquely suited to monetize corporate intangible assets.

== 2000-present ==
Bergelt was then brought into Motorola Corporation in Schaumburg, IL to establish and serve as General Manager of its Strategic Intellectual Asset Management business unit focused on distilling value from Motorola’s intellectual property. In addition, he served as Director of Technology Strategy during his tenure at Motorola.

Following his experience at Motorola and coincident with the departure of Bob Galvin from the Motorola Board of Directors, he was recruited by Kelso & Company, the New York-based private equity firm, to manage IP strategy, business development and licensing for its IP-based portfolio company – Cambridge Display Technology (CDT) – in Cambridge, England.

After establishing the strategy and licensing program at CDT for Kelso, Bergelt was then engaged by Texas Pacific Group (TPG) as a full-time advisor to its Technology Investment Group, until he was recruited by Principal Financial Group to establish and run the first-of-its-kind IP Fund and financial services advisory firm, focused on transforming IP into a viable source of collateral and a fourth lending vertical to complement asset-based lending backed by property/plant/equipment, accounts receivable and inventory.

During his tenure as the CEO of Paradox Capital, Bergelt worked with professionals from banking and IP law to raise over $350MM in capital that enabled Paradox to pioneer the emergence of IP as a viable asset class in asset-based lending and, in so doing, obviate the necessity for second lien lending into IP-rich companies.

Bergelt was then recruited by IBM, Red Hat, Sony, NEC, Philips and Novell to serve as the CEO of Open Invention Network, a pro-competitive defensive patent management organization established to enable freedom to operate in Linux and to support the democratization of innovation occasioned by open source projects such as Linux.

'Bergelt has been the chief executive officer of Open Invention Network since 2008. He is responsible for defending the integrity of the Linux ecosystem. Previously, Bergelt had criticized Microsoft several times for its behavior towards the open source community. When Microsoft changed its behavior, embraced the open source community and signed the Open Invention Network cross license, Bergelt was pleased with the company.

“Microsoft’s participation in OIN adds to our strong community, which through its breadth and depth has reduced patent risk in core technologies, and unequivocally signals for all companies who are using OSS but have yet to join OIN, that the litmus test for authentic behavior in the OSS community includes OIN participation.”

— Keith Bergelt

He has also been interviewed by Linux.com at the 2008 LinuxWorld Expo.
