= LOT Network =

Nonprofit formed to counter Patent Assertion Entities

- Formation: 2014
- Type: Nonprofit
- Purpose: International trade
- Key people: Ken Seddon, CEO
- Website: www.lotnet.com

The LOT (License on Transfer) Network is a nonprofit organization that was formed to combat patent assertion entities (PAEs), also known as patent trolls, by cross-licensing patents that fall into the hands of PAEs.

== Background ==
LOT started as a Canon, Google and Red Hat-led initiative in 2014, and its founding members were mostly technology companies. Companies from other industries such as finance and automotive have joined the network to protect themselves from the growing threat of PAEs. As of January 2026, LOT Network had more than 5,800 members, including the world's largest patent holder, Samsung Electronics, and the three largest smartphone manufacturers. It covers nearly 6 million patent assets which is more than 24% of all U.S. patents. Notable members of LOT include Google, Red Hat, Uber, Ford, Dropbox, Mazda, General Motors, Honda, CBS, Netflix, JPMorgan Chase, SAP, Microsoft, Tesla, Alibaba, the Wikimedia Foundation, and IBM.

The number of patent disputes in the U.S. peaked in 2015, reaching 7,500 cases. According to Unified Patents, two-thirds of these cases were filed by patent trolls. A study out of Boston University found that patent litigation results in direct losses of about $60 billion every year in the U.S.

As of October 2024, LOT had within its membership:

- The world's three largest smartphone manufacturers
- Half of the top 20 largest US patent holders
- Half of the S&P Global 100 and Fortune 100
- 18 of the top 50 holders of AI patents
- 9 out of the top 10 largest holders of blockchain patents
- The top 10 largest cloud computing companies
- The world’s top 7 automakers

== Underlying agreement ==
LOT members agree to mutual non-aggression pact in which they pledge that none of their patents will ever be used by a patent troll to sue another member; however, members can still sell patents and sue other members. Cross-licensing of LOT member patents is subject to certain "triggering" events. A triggering event takes place when a patent passes to a PAE, including scenarios in which a LOT company becomes a PAE or is absorbed by a PAE. After the triggering event, the specific patents involved in the event are automatically cross-licensed to all LOT companies, blocking any potential legal action by a PAE. By pooling their patents, member companies provide immunity to one another and deter potential lawsuits from patent trolls. The group also benefits from a network effect: the more members that join, the more attractive membership becomes for other companies.

LOT members pay an annual fee for network membership. The annual fee depends on company revenues, but ranges from $1,500 to $20,000 per year (about the price of a single patent application). On September 1, 2016 LOT announced that it would waive annual membership fees until March 1, 2017 for companies with less than $5 million in annual revenues. This fee structure facilitates membership for startups and smaller companies, which are also targeted by PAEs. Over half of companies sued by PAEs make less than $10 million in revenue. In the event that a larger LOT member acquires a smaller member, the acquired company can pass on its patent license rights to its acquirer.

== Activities ==
In 2022, LOT Network partnered with a group called ADAPT (an acronym for "Advancing Diversity Across Patent Teams"), founded by leaders from Amazon, Cruise, Google, Disney, Meta, and Microsoft, to advance diversity and representation within the IP community. The company also founded an initiative to create greater transparency among 5G patent holders.

The organization hosts an annual member meeting, LOT Network BRIDGE, which has featured speakers such as current and past U.S. PTO Directors and the head of the Unified Patent Court. The 2026 event will feature John Squires, Under Secretary of Commerce for Intellectual Property and Director of the U.S. Patent and Trademark Office (USPTO), and David Kappos, who has previously held that title, will headline a Director-to-Director fireside chat.

== Reception ==
LOT has steadily grown its international membership, citing members from 56 countries as of October 2024. European bank Barclays announced their LOT membership with CTO and Managing Director Lee Braine saying: “...we are pleased to contribute to and extend the growing global community working together to reduce the PAE threat ." As international participation increased, in 2024, one year after the launch of the Unified Patent Court (UPC), Dr. Klaus Grabinski, President of the Court of Appeal and Chairperson of the Presidium of the Unified Patent Court, provided an update on the first year of the court at LOT Network's annual membership meeting, LOT Network BRIDGE.

In 2023, TechCrunch featured a two-part series on the anatomy of patent litigation, highlighting the aftermath of OpenText’s $6 billion acquisition of Micro Focus, wherein OpenText picked up thousands of granted and pending patents through the acquisition and Micro Focus is now giving up its membership in LOT Network. Reporter Paul Sawers wrote: "OpenText is no stranger to patent assertion, and it has already been accused of behaving like a patent troll in the wake of its 2019 acquisition of data security firm Carbonite — a deal that has led to ongoing patent litigation proceedings against CrowdStrike, Kaspersky, Sophos and Trend Micro."

Semiconductor giant GlobalFoundries encouraged others within the industry to join LOT in order to safeguard their sector. Their Chief IP Counsel Adam Noah said: "Semiconductors are the key building blocks for so many products that the world relies on to live, work and connect. We are committed to protecting our technology and securely manufacturing the essential chips our customers, partners and industry rely on. By joining the LOT Network, we are further safeguarding our business and our customers against PAE litigation, allowing us to focus on the important work of delivering world-class technology solutions. We encourage others within the semiconductor manufacturing and design ecosystem to address the PAE drain on resources by joining LOT’s protective community, which provides strength in numbers.”

Shopify's General Counsel published a piece encouraging young companies to take an active part in preventing and fighting PAE litigation: "Since we started fighting back, fewer entities sue us...We'll continue supporting organizations like...LOT Network that fight this battle daily...To the entrepreneurs reading this: we see you. We know a single meritless lawsuit can kill a young company. That's why we fight, not just for Shopify, but for the entire ecosystem of builders who deserve to create without fear."

While LOT helps prevent patent trolling, it does not address low patent quality or hinder companies that attack competitors to stall progress and gain a competitive advantage. Daniel Nazer, a staff attorney at the Electronic Frontier Foundation praised LOT but added a note of caution: “It’s a targeted program that’s good for limiting the supply of patents to the very worst actors who use litigation to shake down people for settlements, but it doesn’t stop problems with patent quality and with operating companies attacking each other.” The Electronic Frontier Foundation alleges that, ultimately, the patent system must be reformed to ensure that the U.S. Patent Office only grants patents for genuine inventions.

Intellectual Ventures, a well known PAE, alleges that by buying patents they create a market for invention, thereby helping to revitalize inefficient companies and make innovation profitable. Others, including Ira Blumberg – a former Rambus (a well-known PAE) employee – have countered that any value created by patent trolls is outweighed by settlement costs. Deputy Editor Angela Morris of IP-focused publication IAM wrote that in late December 2025, NPEs featured prominently among buyers of US patents.

In 2017, IAM published an analysis of the financial return on joining LOT Network. The article concluded that LOT Network membership offers significant ROI, particularly for companies facing PAE threats, with benefits increasing over time. A financial model for assessing ROI is available for download.

== See also ==
- Open Invention Network
