= Northwest, Inc. v. Ginsberg =

- Supreme Court of the United States

Decided April 2, 2014
- Full case name: Northwest, Inc. v. Ginsberg
- Citations: 572 U.S. 273 (more)

Holding
- The ADA preempts a state-law claim for breach of the implied covenant of good faith and fair dealing if it seeks to enlarge the contractual obligations that the parties voluntarily adopt.

Court membership
- Chief Justice John Roberts Associate Justices Antonin Scalia · Anthony Kennedy; Clarence Thomas · Ruth Bader Ginsburg; Stephen Breyer · Samuel Alito; Sonia Sotomayor · Elena Kagan

Case opinion
- Majority: Alito, joined by unanimous

Laws applied
- Airline Deregulation Act of 1978

Northwest, Inc. v. Ginsberg, 572 U.S. 273 (2014), was a United States Supreme Court case in which the court held that the Airline Deregulation Act of 1978 preempts a state-law claim for breach of the implied covenant of good faith and fair dealing if it seeks to enlarge the contractual obligations that the parties voluntarily adopt.

== Background ==
Northwest, Inc., terminated Ginsberg's membership in its frequent flyer program, apparently based on a provision in the frequent flyer agreement that gave Northwest sole discretion to determine whether a participant had abused the program. Ginsberg filed suit, asserting that Northwest had breached its contract by revoking his membership status without valid cause and had violated the duty of good faith and fair dealing because it terminated his membership in a way that contravened his reasonable expectations. The federal District Court found that the Airline Deregulation Act of 1978 (ADA) preempted the breach of the duty of good faith and fair dealing claim and dismissed the breach of contract claim without prejudice. Ginsberg appealed only the dismissal of his breach of the duty of good faith and fair dealing claim. The Ninth Circuit Court of Appeals reversed, finding that claim "too tenuously connected to airline regulation to trigger" ADA preemption.

== Opinion of the court ==
The Supreme Court issued an opinion on April 2, 2014. The Supreme Court reversed and remanded. The Court relied on American Airlines, Inc. v. Wolens for the decision for this case.
