= Tolan v. Cotton =

- Supreme Court of the United States

Decided May 5, 2014
- Full case name: Tolan v. Cotton
- Citations: 572 U.S. 650 (more)

Holding
- When resolving questions of qualified immunity at summary judgment, a court must take all facts in the light most favorable to the nonmoving party, including whether a constitutional right was clearly established.

Court membership
- Chief Justice John Roberts Associate Justices Antonin Scalia · Anthony Kennedy; Clarence Thomas · Ruth Bader Ginsburg; Stephen Breyer · Samuel Alito; Sonia Sotomayor · Elena Kagan

Case opinions
- Per curiam
- Concurrence: Alito (in judgment), joined by Scalia

Tolan v. Cotton, 572 U.S. 650 (2014), was a United States Supreme Court case in which the court held that, when resolving questions of qualified immunity at summary judgment, a court must take all facts in the light most favorable to the nonmoving party, including whether a constitutional right was clearly established.

== Background ==
Police sergeant Jeffrey Cotton fired three bullets at Robert Tolan; one of those bullets punctured Tolan's right lung. At the time of the shooting, Tolan was unarmed on his parents' front porch about 15 to 20 feet away from Cotton. Tolan sued, alleging that Cotton had exercised excessive force in violation of the Fourth Amendment. The district court granted summary judgment to Cotton, and the Fifth Circuit Court of Appeals affirmed, reasoning that regardless of whether Cotton used excessive force, he was entitled to qualified immunity because he did not violate any clearly established right.
