= United States v. Quality Stores, Inc. =

- Supreme Court of the United States

Decided March 25, 2014
- Full case name: United States v. Quality Stores, Inc.
- Citations: 572 U.S. 141 (more)

Holding
- Severance payments to employees who are involuntarily terminated during a Chapter 11 bankruptcy proceeding are taxable wages under FICA.

Court membership
- Chief Justice John Roberts Associate Justices Antonin Scalia · Anthony Kennedy; Clarence Thomas · Ruth Bader Ginsburg; Stephen Breyer · Samuel Alito; Sonia Sotomayor · Elena Kagan

Case opinion
- Majority: Kennedy, joined by unanimous
- Kagan took no part in the consideration or decision of the case.

Laws applied
- Federal Insurance Contributions Act

United States v. Quality Stores, Inc., 572 U.S. 141 (2014), was a United States Supreme Court case in which the court held that severance payments to employees who are involuntarily terminated during a Chapter 11 bankruptcy proceeding are taxable wages under the Federal Insurance Contributions Act.

== Background ==
Quality Stores, Inc., and its affiliates (collectively Quality Stores) made severance payments to employees who were involuntarily terminated as part of Quality Stores's Chapter 11 bankruptcy. Payments—which were made pursuant to plans that did not tie payments to the receipt of state unemployment insurance—varied based on job seniority and time served. Quality Stores paid and withheld, among other things, taxes required under the Federal Insurance Contributions Act (FICA). Later believing that the payments should not have been taxed as wages under FICA, Quality Stores sought a refund on behalf of itself and about 1,850 former employees. When the Internal Revenue Service (IRS) did not allow or deny the refund, Quality Stores initiated proceedings in the Bankruptcy Court, which granted summary judgment in its favor. On appeal, the federal District Court and the Sixth Circuit Court of Appeals affirmed, concluding that severance payments were not wages under FICA.

== Opinion of the court ==
The Supreme Court issued an opinion on March 25, 2014.
