= EPA v. EME Homer City Generation, L.P. =

- Supreme Court of the United States

Decided April 29, 2014
- Full case name: EPA v. EME Homer City Generation, L.P.
- Citations: 572 U.S. 489 (more)

Holding
- The CAA does not require that states be given a second opportunity to file a State Implementation Plan after the EPA has quantified interstate pollution obligations under a reasonable interpretation of the Good Neighbor Provision.

Court membership
- Chief Justice John Roberts Associate Justices Antonin Scalia · Anthony Kennedy; Clarence Thomas · Ruth Bader Ginsburg; Stephen Breyer · Samuel Alito; Sonia Sotomayor · Elena Kagan

Case opinions
- Majority: Ginsburg
- Dissent: Scalia, joined by Thomas
- Alito took no part in the consideration or decision of the case.

Laws applied
- Clean Air Act

EPA v. EME Homer City Generation, L.P., 572 U.S. 489 (2014), was a United States Supreme Court case in which the court held that the Clean Air Act does not require that states be given a second opportunity to file a state implementation plan after the Environmental Protection Agency has quantified interstate pollution obligations under a reasonable interpretation of the Good Neighbor Provision.
