= Laffey Matrix =

Fee schedule for District of Columbia lawyers

The Laffey Matrix is a fee schedule used by many United States courts for determining the reasonable hourly rates in the District of Columbia for attorneys' fee awards under federal fee-shifting statutes.

== Overview ==
The Laffey Matrix originated in Laffey v. Northwest Airlines, 572 F. Supp. 354 (D.D.C. 1983), reversed, 746 F.2d 4 (D.C. Cir. 1984), overruled, Save Our Cumberland Mountains v. Hodel, 857 F.2d 1516, 1525 (D.C. Cir. 1988) (en banc). Counsel in the Laffey case compiled evidence from firms showing the market rates in the District of Columbia for complex federal litigation. That evidence was analyzed and a matrix of rates for attorneys at various experience levels was created, later becoming known as the Laffey Matrix.

Based on Blum v. Stenson, 465 U.S. 886 (1984), the district court in Laffey adopted the matrix and expressly rejected the use of the size or type of the law firm in setting hourly rates. Laffey v. Northwest Airlines, Inc., supra, 572 F. Supp. at 374. On appeal, the Court of Appeals for the D.C. Circuit rejected use of the matrix in favor of the firm's actual billing rate, thus restricting fee awards to small firms, such as the counsel in Laffey, to their own reduced billing rates. Laffey v. Northwest Airlines, supra, 746 F.2d at 24–25. Four years later, in Save Our Cumberland Mountains, the D.C. Circuit sitting en banc overruled the Laffey decision (857 F.2d at 1524) stating:

Congress did not intend the private but public-spirited rate-cutting attorney to be penalized for his public spiritedness by being paid on a lower scale than either his higher priced fellow barrister from a more established firm or his salaried neighbor at a legal services clinic.

In short, we conclude that our prior decision in Laffey v. Northwest Airlines, Inc., and the panel decision in this case, which it compelled, are both inconsistent with the Supreme Court’s decision in Blum v. Stenson which construed those statutes. We therefore expressly overrule Laffey to the extent that it imposes the above discussed different method of determining reasonable attorney fees on attorneys situated as Yablonski and Galloway are here. Henceforth, the prevailing market rate method heretofore used in awarding fees to traditional for-profit firms and public interest legal services organizations shall apply as well to those attorneys who practice privately and for profit but at reduced rates reflecting non-economic goals.

The original Laffey Matrix provided market rates for the period from June 1, 1981, through May 31, 1982, based on different levels of experience. At the urging of the D.C. Circuit in its en banc decision in Save Our Cumberland Mountains v. Hodel, supra, 857 F.2d at 1525, the matrix was updated through May 31, 1989, in connection with a settlement reached on remand in that case. See, e.g., Trout v. Ball, 705 F. Supp. 705, 709, n. 10 (D.D.C. 1989)(the updated matrix developed in Save Our Cumberland Mountains v. Hodel “does provide an updated and accurate schedule of attorney fees in this District”).

The applicant for a fee award must establish the prevailing market rates. To establish the prevailing market rates in the District of Columbia, the applicant "may point to such evidence as an updated version of the Laffey Matrix or the U.S. Attorney’s Office matrix, or their own survey of prevailing market rates in the community." Covington v. District of Columbia, 57 F.3d 1101, 1109 (D.C. Cir. 1995).

Fee applicants often point to the Laffey Matrix. Over the years, two methods of adjusting the Laffey Matrix for the passage of time have developed: the U.S. Attorney's Office Laffey Matrix and the Legal Service Index-Adjusted Laffey Matrix. These methods produced different hourly rates due to the use of different inflation metrics. The U.S. Attorney's Office for the District of Columbia also developed a new matrix in 2015, but it was rejected by the court of appeals for the D.C. Circuit.

== U.S. Attorney's Office Laffey Matrix ==
For many years, the United States Attorney's Office used the Laffey Matrix ("USAO Laffey Matrix") as a basis for hourly rates for attorneys' fees in litigation claims. This matrix used the original Laffey Matrix from 1982 and adjusted it annually using changes in the Bureau of Labor Statistics Consumer Price Index for all Urban Consumers for the Washington-Baltimore area. The result was a routinely adjusted United States Attorney's Office Matrix: a table which provided hourly rates, based on years of experience, for attorneys, paralegals and law clerks in the Washington, D.C. area.

In 2015, the USAO revised its method. Its matrix is no longer based on the Laffey Matrix. Its matrix is now based on data from a 2010-2011 ALM survey adjusted using the Producer Price Index-Office of Lawyers (PPI-OL) index (the "USAO Matrix"). The USAO Matrix is based on rates for all types of legal services, not exclusively complex federal litigation like the Laffey Matrix. It is also based on rates for the Washington metro area (which includes areas in West Virginia, Virginia, and Maryland, and Washington, DC), not just the District of Columbia. For these reasons, the U.S. Court of Appeals for the D.C. Circuit rejected the new matrix as reflecting rates for complex federal litigation in the District of Columbia in D.L. v. District of Columbia, 924 F.3d 585 (D.C. Cir. 2019).

Many defendants have taken the position that the USAO Laffey Matrix or the new USAO Matrix should be used instead of the Legal Service Index (LSI) adjustment method presumably because the USAO Laffey Matrix and the new USAO Matrix produced lower hourly rates than the LSI-Adjusted Laffey Matrix. Some courts in the United States have used the USAO Laffey Matrix and the new USAO Matrix when awarding attorneys' fees under a fee-shifting statute, such as the Civil Rights Attorney's Fees Awards Act.

== LSI-Adjusted Laffey Matrix ==
Based on Covington, some fee applicants have established the prevailing market rates using the Laffey Matrix adjusted by the Legal Services Component of the Consumer Price Index referred to as the Legal Services Index or the LSI. The LSI is provided monthly by the Bureau of Labor Statistics. The LSI-Adjusted Laffey Matrix is based on the 1989 update of the Laffey Matrix prepared following Save Our Cumberland Mountains. The LSI-Adjusted Laffey Matrix produces higher hourly rates than the USAO Laffey Matrix or the newer USAO Matrix. Some courts in the United States have awarded fees using the LSI-Adjusted Laffey Matrix. In December 2015, the D.C. Circuit affirmed such a fee award. Salazar v. District of Columbia, 809 F.3d 58 (D.C. Cir. 2015). The D.C. Circuit agreed with the district court that the evidence presented by plaintiffs demonstrates that "the LSI-Updated Laffey Matrix 'is probably a conservative estimate of the actual cost of legal services in this area'" (emphasis in original). It concluded that “[t]he District, neither below nor on appeal, rebuts this logic with relevant arguments.” The Court noted that the fact that other courts have applied the USAO Laffey Matrix “is not compelling.”

Other courts have rejected the LSI-Adjusted Laffey Matrix, particularly for cases in the Washington-Baltimore region, and have based fee awards the USAO Laffey Matrix. See, e.g., Pleasants v. Ridge, 424 F. Supp. 2d 67, n.2 (D.D.C. 2006); Judicial Watch, Inc. v. BLM, No. 07-1570, 2008 U.S. Dist. LEXIS 49069.

== Another new matrix ==
As described above, in 2019, the U.S. Court of Appeals for the District of Columbia Circuit rejected the new USAO matrix based on the ALM survey data. DL v. District of Columbia, 924 F.3d 585 (D.C. Cir. 2019). Thereafter, the USAO stated that it was working with other parties to develop a revised matrix for complex federal litigation.

== Some decisions from non-D.C. courts ==
The Court of Appeals for the Third Circuit affirmed a fee award based on the LSI-Adjusted Laffey Matrix for a Washington, D.C., law firm litigating a case in New Jersey. Interfaith Community Organization v. Honeywell International, Inc., 426 F.3d 694 (3rd Cir. 2005)("In updating the matrix to account for inflation from 1989-2003, ICO relied on the legal services component of the nationwide Consumer Price Index ('the Legal Services Index'), a measure of inflation in the cost of legal services maintained by the Bureau of Labor Statistics."). The Court of Appeals noted that the District Court "reviewed both indices [the USAO Laffey Matrix and the LSI-Adjusted Laffey Matrix] and decided that [the LSI-Adjusted Laffey Matrix] represented a better measure of prevailing rates in Washington, DC. The Third Circuit issued a similar affirmance of a fee award based on the LSI-Adjusted Laffey Matrix in ICO v. Honeywell International, Inc., 726 F. 3d 744 (3d Cir. 2013).

The Fourth Circuit expressly disapproved reliance on the Laffey Matrix in Robinson v. Equifax Information Services, LLC, 560 F.3d 235 (4th Cir. 2009), requiring instead that fee awards be based on prevailing market rates established by evidence.

Some California federal courts have adjusted the Laffey Matrix upwards based upon the higher costs of living in Los Angeles and other California cities. In Re HPL Technologies, Inc. Securities Litigation, 366 F.Supp.2d 912, 921 (N. Dist. Cal. 2005). See also “It is the practice of the undersigned judge, however, to rely on official data to determine appropriate hourly rates, not on an attorney's self-proclaimed rates or declarations regarding hourly rates charged by law firms. One reliable official source for rates that vary by experience levels is the Laffey matrix used in the District of Columbia.” Garnes v. Barnhardt, 2006 U.S. Dist. LEXIS 5938 (N. Dist. Cal. 2006).

== The inflation indices ==
The USAO Laffey Matrix is adjusted based on the CPI. The LSI-Adjusted Laffey Matrix is adjusted based on the LSI. The new USAO matrix, which was rejected by the D.C. Circuit in DL, is adjusted based on the PPI-OL.

The CPI is a broad index that includes price changes for over 100,000 commodities, most of which are not relevant to legal services. Both the LSI and the PPI-OL measure a national rate of change of prices for legal services.

The Bureau of Labor Statistics has maintained the LSI since 1987 and the PPI-OL since 1997. For the years they have in common, these two indices report comparable rates of price change for legal services. This means that when the same hourly rate is adjusted with the LSI compared to the PPI-OL, the resulting LSI hourly rate is about the same as the PPI-OL hourly rate.

== Opposing economists' opinions ==
Laura Malowane of Economists Incorporated is an economist with a Ph.D. from Princeton University. She believes that the LSI-Adjusted Laffey Matrix is inferior to the USAO Laffey Matrix for the following reasons: 1) The LSI measures prices changes in basic, personal, consumer-oriented legal services such as uncontested divorce and DUI and not complex federal litigation; 2) The LSI is a nationwide average index and not specific to the D.C. metropolitan region; 3) The LSI is primarily for flat-fee services rather than hourly rates; 4) The LSI does not take into account discounted rates, contingency fees, and other reasons actual collected rates may differ from hourly billing rates; and 5) Actual hourly billing rates of attorneys in the Washington, D.C. area are, according to published survey data, more accurately represented by rates outlined in the USAO Laffey Matrix than in the LSI-Adjusted Laffey Matrix.

Dr. Michael Kavanaugh is the economist credited by the D.C. Circuit in the Salazar case. In his opinion, the LSI-Adjusted Laffey Matrix is a better reflection of the District of Columbia market for complex federal litigation for the following reasons: 1. it is based on more recent observations (1989 data compared to 1982 data), which is more likely to produce a better forecast of actual rates; 2. the LSI is specific to legal services whereas the CPI is based on a basket of general goods that is dominated by the cost of housing, food, etc.; 3. the LSI includes some services associated with litigation, such as preparing briefs and attending depositions; 4. the Washington, D.C. market for complex federal litigation is a national market where firms from across the country compete to provide such services; 5. market data shows that the LSI-Adjusted Laffey Matrix produces rates that are below market and the USAO Laffey Matrix rates are even lower.

These same economists also disagreed in DL v. District of Columbia as to the relative merits of the LSI-Adjusted Laffey Matrix and the new USAO matrix.

== Another option ==
Another method is to adjust for local costs of wages to lawyers and paralegals. The Laffey Matrix can be adjusted for local costs using the Bureau of Labor Statistics data on wages paid to lawyers (occupation code 23-1011) and paralegals (occupation code 23-2011) for primary metropolitan statistical areas in each state (http://www.bls.gov). This method appears to be a re-formulation of the argument rejected in Blum v. Stenson, supra, 465 U.S. at 892, 895–896, that compensation to some attorneys should be based on costs including salary levels.

== See also ==
- Attorney's fee
