= Allied Security Trust =

Allied Security Trust (AST) is an independent, not-for-profit cooperative that provides its members with a method of mitigating the risk of patent assertions and litigation.

== Business ==
Each member contribute to the operating expense of the trust, and hold funds in escrow for the purchase of patents. Each member's escrow funds are used for the purchase of only those patents that they are interested in. The members involved in the purchase are then licensed to the patents. After a certain period of time, the patents are sold or donated. This is known as a catch and release strategy. AST does not litigate.

== Members ==
Allied Security Trust public members in 2023, include

- Avaya
- Adobe
- Cisco
- Dolby
- Google
- IBM
- Intel
- Meta
- Microsoft
- Oracle
- Philips
- Salesforce
- ServiceNow
- Snap
- Sony
- Spotify
- Uber
- Verizon

== Executives ==
- Russell Binns, Jr., CEO
- Andrew Hopkin, CFO
- Mihir Patel, VP, Technology & Analytics
- Ray Strimaitis, VP, Corporate Development & Global Strategy

== See also ==
- PatentFreedom
- Patent troll
- RPX Corporation
- Open Invention Network
