= List of United States Supreme Court cases, volume 572 =

This is a list of all the United States Supreme Court cases from volume 572 of the United States Reports:

Case name	Citation	Date decided
Lozano v. Montoya Alvarez	572 U.S. 1	March 5, 2014
The one-year period in which the Hague Convention on the Civil Aspects of International Child Abduction provides a parent with an automatic return remedy cannot be equitably tolled.
BG Group plc v. Republic of Argentina	572 U.S. 25	March 5, 2014
A court of the United States that is reviewing an arbitration award made under a treaty should interpret and apply "threshold" provisions concerning arbitration using the framework developed for interpreting similar provisions in ordinary contracts.
Rosemond v. United States	572 U.S. 65	March 5, 2014
Convicting someone for aiding and abetting requires the prosecution to prove conduct extending to some part of the crime and intent extending to the whole crime.
Marvin M. Brandt Revocable Tr. v. United States	572 U.S. 93	March 10, 2014
Rights of way under the 1875 Act are easements that terminate by the railroad's abandonment, leaving a private owner's land unburdened.
Lexmark Int'l, Inc. v. Static Control Components, Inc.	572 U.S. 118	March 25, 2014
Static Control's alleged injuries—lost sales and damage to its business reputation—fall within the zone of interests protected by the Lanham Act, and Static Control sufficiently alleged that its injuries were proximately caused by Lexmark's misrepresentations.
United States v. Quality Stores, Inc.	572 U.S. 141	March 25, 2014
Severance payments to employees who are involuntarily terminated during a Chapter 11 bankruptcy proceeding are taxable wages under FICA.
United States v. Castleman	572 U.S. 157	March 26, 2014
The "physical force" requirement under 18 U.S.C. § 922(g)(9), which criminalizes possession of a firearm by a person convicted of a 'misdemeanor crime of domestic violence,' is satisfied by the “offensive touching” degree of force that supports a common-law battery conviction and does not require the greater showing of violent contact.
McCutcheon v. FEC	572 U.S. 185	April 2, 2014
Limitations on aggregate contributions to campaign finances violate the Free Speech Clause of the First Amendment to the Constitution of the United States.
Northwest, Inc. v. Ginsberg	572 U.S. 273	April 2, 2014
The ADA preempts a state-law claim for breach of the implied covenant of good faith and fair dealing if it seeks to enlarge the contractual obligations that the parties voluntarily adopt.
Schuette v. Coal. Defend Affirmative Action, Integration & Immigration Rights	572 U.S. 291	April 22, 2014
The Fourteenth Amendment's Equal Protection Clause does not prevent states from enacting bans on affirmative action in education.
Navarette v. California	572 U.S. 393	April 22, 2014
When acting upon information provided by an anonymous tip, police officers need not personally verify the existence of ongoing criminal activity.
White v. Woodall	572 U.S. 415	April 23, 2014
The rejection of the requested jury instruction in this case was not objectively unreasonable or contrary to clearly established law, so the defendant did not satisfy the requirements for seeking habeas relief under AEDPA.
Paroline v. United States	572 U.S. 434	April 23, 2014
To recover restitution, the government or the victim must establish a causal relationship between the defendant's conduct and the victim's harm or damages.
EPA v. EME Homer City Generation, L.P.	572 U.S. 489	April 29, 2014
The Clean Air Act does not require that states be given a second opportunity to file a State Implementation Plan after the EPA has quantified interstate pollution obligations under a reasonable interpretation of the Good Neighbor Provision.
Octane Fitness, LLC v. ICON Health & Fitness, Inc.	572 U.S. 545	April 29, 2014
The Brooks Furniture framework—which allowed attorney-fees awards under the Patent Act in cases with "material inappropriate conduct" or cases that were "objectively baseless" and "brought in subjective bad faith" as shown by clear and convincing evidence—is unduly rigid and not to be used.
Highmark Inc. v. Allcare Health Management System, Inc.	572 U.S. 559	April 29, 2014
Reversed and remanded for reconsideration in light of Octane Fitness.
Town of Greece v. Galloway	572 U.S. 565	May 5, 2014
The town of Greece does not violate the First Amendment's Establishment Clause by opening its meetings with sectarian prayer that comports with America's tradition and doesn't coerce participation by nonadherents.
Robers v. United States	572 U.S. 639	May 5, 2014
Restitution in cases involving mortgage fraud is determined by the actual money lent not the value of the property.
Tolan v. Cotton	572 U.S. 650	May 5, 2014
When resolving questions of qualified immunity at summary judgment, a court must take all facts in the light most favorable to the nonmoving party, including whether a constitutional right was clearly established.
Petrella v. Metro-Goldwyn-Mayer, Inc.	572 U.S. 663	May 19, 2014
Laches cannot be invoked as a bar to a pursuit of a claim for damages brought within the three-year window provided by 17 U.S.C. § 507(b). Because laches is an equitable doctrine, it can have no role in determining the timeliness of an action for damages.
Hall v. Florida	572 U.S. 701	May 27, 2014
A Florida law allowing the execution of borderline mentally handicapped individuals violated the Eighth Amendment's prohibition of cruel and unusual punishments.
Wood v. Moss	572 U.S. 744	May 27, 2014
Secret Service agents are entitled to qualified immunity from First Amendment claims after they removed protesters who had crossed their security perimeter from demonstrating against the President.
Plumhoff v. Rickard	572 U.S. 765	May 27, 2014
(1) The Sixth Circuit properly exercised jurisdiction under 28 U. S. C. §1291. (2) The officers' conduct did not violate the Fourth Amendment. (3) Even if the officers' conduct had violated the Fourth Amendment, petitioners would still be entitled to summary judgment based on qualified immunity.
Michigan v. Bay Mills Indian Community	572 U.S. 782	May 27, 2014
Tribal sovereign immunity bars a lawsuit brought by the state against gaming off of Indian lands.
Martinez v. Illinois	572 U.S. 833	May 27, 2014
Jeopardy attaches when the jury is empaneled and sworn. When the trial court swore in the jury and invited the State to present its first witness, the State declined to present any evidence because it wanted a continuance. The trial court entered a directed verdict of not guilty, and the Supreme Court upheld that verdict.
Bond v. United States	572 U.S. 844	June 2, 2014
A fair reading of statutes must be certain of the intent of Congress before it finds that federal law overrides the usual constitutional balance of federal and state powers.
Nautilus, Inc. v. Biosig Instruments, Inc	572 U.S. 898	June 2, 2014
Patent claims are invalid as indefinite under 35 U.S.C. § 112 ¶ 2 when, in light of the specification and the prosecution history, they fail to inform, with reasonable certainty, those skilled in the art about the scope of the invention.
Limelight Networks, Inc. v. Akamai Technologies, Inc.	572 U.S. 915	June 2, 2014
Induced patent infringement cannot occur without direct infringement.
