= Stick licensing =

Stick licensing is the practice of licensing a patent or other form of intellectual property where the patent holder threatens to sue the licensee for patent infringement if the licensee does not take a license. In contrast to the stick licensing, the "carrot licensing" is a "friendly approach in luring the target to adopting one's invention and taking a license".

== See also ==
- Carrot and stick
- Patent troll
