= MPHJ Technology Investments =

Waco, Texas-based company

- Headquarters: Waco, Texas

MPHJ Technology Investments is a Waco, Texas-based company that has been called the poster child for "patent trolls" due to its practice of suing small businesses for patent infringement for using the scan-to-email function on their own office equipment. The company's argument is that they own the patent for the networked scan-to-email process and so are entitled to payments for each worker at a business that uses this function. The company is controlled by Jay Mac Rust, a lawyer from Texas.

== Controversial patent activities ==
MPHJ bought the patents for the scan-to-email function in 2012, and began sending letters to small businesses threatening them with patent infringement lawsuits later that year. In their letters, the company demanded that these businesses pay them a varying amount of money ($9,000 for the smallest business targeted and more for the others). The company has been targeted by different politicians, including Jim Bruning and Peter DeFazio, the latter of whom introduced the anti-patent troll SHIELD Act into the House of Representatives. In 2014, the Federal Trade Commission (FTC) filed a complaint against MPHJ, and on November 6 of that year, the FTC and MPHJ announced an agreement under the terms of which MPHJ would no longer make deceptive claims. In September 2015, the US Court of Appeals for the Federal Circuit issued an opinion requiring that MPHJ face charges in Vermont over allegations that it violated that state's consumer protection laws.
