= Personal Audio (3D audio company) =

3D audio company

Personal Audio Pty Ltd, incorporated on 1 March 2007, is a provider of 3D audio technology solutions applied into video games, music listening and VOIP telecommunications. The company focuses principally on solutions that are complementary to existing technologies and leverages off the research originally carried out at the Auditory Neuroscience Laboratory at the University of Sydney, Australia. The company has received seed investment from Allen and Buckeridge and is headquartered in Sydney.

== MyEars Surround Audio ==
Their first product, MyEars, launched in beta test on 14 July 2010, is a web based audio profiling service that creates 7.1 surround sound over headphones that is individualised to the listener. The 3D audio effect rendering process is quite standard; however, the profiling service uses a hearing localisation test to make a prediction of the ear shape of the listener and generates individualized Head Related Transfer Functions (HRTFs) for the right and left ears. These are downloaded to the user's gaming PC. The audio rendering is carried out using FMOD by Firelight Technology using either a dedicated client (MyEars-Connect) that sits between the video game and the operating system or directly in-game if FMOD is utilised as the game audio engine.

The MyEars service completed beta testing in early September and was launched on 19 September 2010. Reviews have been generally positive. This development has been cited by the International Society for Presence Research (see Presence (telepresence)). The company reports a growing user base.
