= Attorney's fee =

Term for compensation for legal services

Attorney's fee is a chiefly United States term for compensation for legal services performed by an attorney (lawyer or law firm) for a client, in or out of court.

Fees may be an hourly, flat-rate or contingent fee. Recent studies suggest that when lawyers charge a flat-fee rather than billing by the hour, they work less hard on behalf of clients and clients get worse outcomes.

Attorney fees are separate from fines, compensatory and punitive damages, and (except in Nevada) from court costs in a legal case. Under the "American rule", attorney fees are usually not paid by the losing party to the winning party in a case, except pursuant to specific statutory or contractual rights.

== Overview ==
The phrase is a legal term of art in American jurisprudence (in which lawyers are collectively referred to as "attorneys", a wording practice not found in most other legal systems). Attorney's fees (or attorneys' fees, depending upon number of attorneys involved, or simplified to attorney fees) are the fees, including labor charges and costs, charged by lawyers or their firms for legal services provided by them to their clients. They do not include incidental and non-legal costs (e.g., expedited shipping costs for legal documents). Generally (Nevada being an exception), attorney fees are tabulated separately from court costs, and are also separate from fines, compensatory and punitive damages, and other monies in a legal case not enumerated as court costs.

The analogous concept has differing names and applicability in common law systems such as in most of the Commonwealth of Nations, and in civil law systems such as those of most of Europe and many former European colonies. For example, in a court case under English law, the fees of solicitors and barristers (two types of lawyer) are combined with court costs and various other expenses into a combined "costs", while non-court solicitor expenses may be separately billed as per-hour charges, and those of barristers as daily brief fees. The losing party in a case in most common law systems pays for the costs (including fees) of both parties.

State laws or bar association regulations, many of which are based on Rule 1.5 of the American Bar Association's Rules of Professional Conduct, govern the terms under which lawyers can accept fees. Many complaints to ethics boards regarding attorneys revolve around excessive attorney's fees.

In some American jurisdictions, a lawyer for the plaintiff in a civil case can take a case on a contingent fee basis. A contingent fee is a percentage of the monetary judgment or settlement. The contingent fee may be split among several firms who have contractual arrangements amongst themselves for referrals or other assistance. Where a plaintiff loses, the attorney may not receive any money for his or her work. In practice, historically tort cases involving personal injury often involve contingent fees, with attorneys being paid a portion of the pain and suffering damages; one commentator says a typical split of pain and suffering is one-third for the lawyer, one-third for the physician, and one-third for the plaintiff.

The contingent fee has been described as the ‘poor man’s key to the courthouse". Whereas, corporations or wealthy individuals can afford to hire attorneys to pursue their legal interests, the contingency fee affords any injury victim the opportunity, regardless of ability to pay, to hire the best attorney in his or her field. Most jurisdictions in the United States prohibit working for a contingent fee in family law or criminal cases.

In the United States, an up-front fee paid to a lawyer is called a retainer. Money within the retainer is often used to "buy" a certain amount of work. Some contracts provide that when the money from the retainer is gone, the fee is renegotiated. This is to be differentiated between a retainer in Commonwealth states, where a retainer is the contract that is initially signed by a client to engage a lawyer. Money may or may not be paid upfront, but the lawyer is still "retained".

== Amount of fees ==
Attorney fees are negotiated between the attorney and client, subject to any limits imposed by state law and the general principle that an attorney fee must be reasonable. Although fee agreements in most cases can be oral agreements, it is good practice for lawyers to enter formal written fee agreements with their clients, and to clearly describe how fees are calculated.

In 2006, median salaries of new graduates ranged from US$50,000 per year in small firms (two to ten attorneys) to US$160,000 per year in very large firms (more than 501 attorneys). The distribution of these salaries was highly bimodal, with the majority of new lawyers earning at either the high end or the low end of the scale, and a median salary of US$62,000. In the summer of 2016, New York law firm Cravath, Swaine & Moore raised its first-year associate salary to $180,000. Many other high-end New York-based and large national law firms soon followed. Two years later, in the summer of 2018, New York law firm Milbank raised its first-year associate salary to $190,000, with other major firms following shortly thereafter. In 2022 Milbank increased first-year compensation to $215,000, with most comparable firms following suit.

=== Hourly rates ===
The range of fees charged by lawyers varies widely from one city to the next. Most large law firms in the United States bill between $200 and $1,000 per hour for their lawyers' time, although the fees charged by smaller firms are much lower. The rate varies by location as well as the specific area of law practiced. Typically insurance defense firms have lower hourly rates than non-insurance firms, but are compensated by having steady, regular paying work provided. Regional urban centers such as Salt Lake City will average $150 per hour for an associate's time on a basic case, but that fee will increase for larger firms. Within large firms in the United States, billable hours are considered a measure of productivity with a minimum of about 1,800 required or expected of associates.

In the United States, lawyers typically earn between $100,000 and $220,000 per year, although earnings vary by age and experience, practice setting, sex, and race. Solo practitioners typically earn less than lawyers in corporate law firms but more than those working for state or local government. Solo practitioners make an average of $65,000.

Many surveys of hourly rates are done. The American Intellectual Property Law Association (AIPLA) commissions a survey of its members every two years and it publishes these in what it calls a "Report of the Economic Survey". The latest one is dated June 2007. Rates are collected for 14 geographic areas and by associate or partner. Many courts have followed the rates shown by these AIPLA surveys and they are highly regarded for intellectual property litigation.

In BigLaw firms, hourly rates vary greatly depending on the lawyer, whether they are a partner or an associate, with other factors taken into consideration. As of 2024, the highest lawyers have a rate of $2,100 to $2,620 per hour, with other partners charging $1,285 to $1,860. Many lawyers in these firms charge in the $800-900 range as well. Researchers created a top 32 list of firms that charge the most, the former figures being most prominent in these firms. As of early 2026, BigLaw lawyer fees have been surging, with one top US firm charging $4,000 per hour for its top partners. Median salaries for associates range from $200,000 to $330,000. This range varies based on years worked as an associate, calculated up to the eighth year: first-year associates make a median of $200,000, while eighth-year associates make a median of $330,000.

The State Bar of Oregon and the Colorado State Bar have published surveys of rates for various areas of their states which are available online.

Perhaps the most widely followed set of rates are what is called the Laffey Matrix available from the United States Attorney's Office for the District of Columbia. These have been available since 1982 and are updated annually. Hourly rates are shown by years of experience. For June 1, 2006, to May 31, 2007, the rates are as follows: 20+ years of experience, $425 per hour; 11–19 years, $375; 8–10 years, $305; 4–7 years, $245; 1–3 years, $205; and paralegals and law clerks, $120. The Laffey Matrix appears to be growing in acceptance by many courts throughout the United States, but the matrix must be adjusted to account for higher or lower costs for legal services in other areas.

Hourly rates are increasing almost every year and some lawyers charge substantially higher than the rates shown by the Laffey Matrix. The first American attorney to regularly charge a four-digit hourly fee ($1,000 and higher) was Benjamin Civiletti in late 2005.

=== Contingent fees ===
A contingent fee, or contingency fee, is an attorney fee that is made contingent on the outcome of a case. A typical contingent fee in a tort case is normally one third to forty percent of the recovery, but the attorney does not recover a fee unless money is recovered for the client. States prohibit contingent fees in certain types of cases. For example, most states forbid contingent fees in criminal cases. States typically require that a fee agreement that involves a contingent fee be reduced to writing and signed by the client.

=== Other fee arrangements ===
With the ongoing recession of the 2000s, corporate clients began driving attorneys increasingly toward alternative fee arrangements (AFAs), which can include flat fees (per matter), fixed fees (for a "book" of matters), success bonuses, and other options. Recent studies suggest that when lawyers charge a fixed-fee rather than billing by the hour, they work less hard on behalf of clients and client get worse outcomes.

=== Regulation of attorney fees ===
In some types of cases, such as workers' compensation cases, attorney fees may be limited by statute, or subject to judicial review. Contingency fees in personal injury and medical malpractice cases are often capped by state law. In other cases, attorney fees may be subject to review for reasonableness. For example, in class action cases the court in which the case is resolved will review the attorney fees of class counsel for reasonableness.

In a landmark 1985 decision, Walters v. National Association of Radiation Survivors, the U.S. Supreme Court held that statutory restrictions on attorney's fees are subject only to highly deferential rational basis review, when challenged as limitations upon the First Amendment right to freedom of speech and the Fifth Amendment right to due process. In other words, if the legislature can articulate any rational basis for restricting attorney's fees, the court must defer to the legislature's considered judgment, and it would take an "extraordinarily strong showing" for a court to decide otherwise. The Court then held that Congress had a rational basis for restricting attorney's fees in veterans' benefits cases to $10. In 2006, the statute at issue in Walters was heavily revised so as to remove the $10 attorney's fee restriction for most veterans' benefits cases. However, the principles articulated by the Walters court remain the law of the land for attorney's fees in general.

Long before the Walters case, conservatives in the United States had begun to put forward tort reform proposals to restrict attorney fees, which gained traction in the 1970s. Medical malpractice tort reforms often include maximum limits on plaintiffs' attorney fees, such as the percentage schedule in California's Medical Injury Compensation Reform Act of 1975. In 2004, Florida passed a constitutional amendment limiting contingent fees in medical malpractice cases.

Although some people have objected to these laws as an unfair restriction on freedom of contract, Justice William Rehnquist rejected that argument in his majority opinion for the Walters court. Rehnquist implied that there was no principled way for the Court to overturn such laws as a violation of freedom of contract without returning to the now-discredited paternalism of the Lochner era, in which the Court had routinely invoked freedom of contract as an excuse to overturn laws regulating minimum wages and child labor. Justice John Paul Stevens filed a dissenting opinion in which he specifically attacked the majority opinion on that point, among others; he began and ended his dissent with the accusation that the majority "does not appreciate the value of individual liberty".

== Who pays ==
Attorney's fee rules by country: English rule: Loser is expected to pay winner's all reasonable fees English rule: Loser pays winner's attorney fees based on fixed schedule or percentage At judge's discretion: fees usually awarded at least partially At judge's discretion: fees usually not awarded American rule: Winners usually pay their own attorney fees

Most countries operate under a "loser pays" system, sometimes called the English rule (in English law it is described as "costs following the event"). Under the English rule, the losing party pays the successful party's legal costs (including lawyers' fees), as well as other court costs.

=== Summary by country ===
Loser is expected to pay winner's reasonable fees

- Austria
- Sweden
- Norway
- Finland
- Denmark
- Estonia
- Honduras
- Kazakhstan
- Ukraine
- Iceland

Loser pays winner's attorney fees based on fixed schedule or percentage

- Poland: amount rewarded must be between minimum and maximum rate.
- South Korea: attorney fees reimbursement rates are determined by Supreme Court rules, they do not cover full expenses.
- Portugal: Loser pays 50% of combined costs of both sides fees.
- Netherlands: Losing side must pay fixed amount depending on number of procedural steps which usually only covers fraction of real fees.
- Hungary
- Germany
- Czech Republic
- Brazil: Between 10% and 20% of disputed value may be recovered in attorney fees.
- Austria
- Slovakia
- Latvia: Up to 5% of total disputed amount.
- Alaska: Up to 30% of attorney fees awarded to the winner
- Switzerland

Judges have wide discretion in awarding attorney fees, but usually they are at least partially bore by the loser

- South Africa
- Russia
- New Zealand
- Kuwait
- Ireland
- Italy
- Chile: The recovered costs are usually very low compared to actual costs.
- Canada
- Bahrain: The recovered costs are usually very low compared to actual costs.
- Australia
- United Arab Emirates
- United Kingdom
- Singapore
- Nicaragua
- Nigeria
- Philippines
- Spain
- Taiwan
- Turkey
- Uruguay
- Venezuela
- Israel
- India

Judges have wide discretion in awarding attorney fees, but usually they're not awarded to the winner

- Malaysia
- Belgium: Legal fees are reimbursed but not attorney fees
- China: Legal fees are reimbursed but not attorney fees usually.
- France: Attorney costs are usually not awarded except for minimal amounts
- Pakistan

Winners usually pay their own attorney fees:

- Mexico: Loser only pays winner fees when they acted illegally or in bad-faith
- Japan: Legal fees are reimbursed but not attorney fees
- United States

=== United States ===
The United States is a notable exception, operating under the American rule, whereby each party is generally liable only for costs (e.g., filing fees, motion fees, fees for service of process, etc.) but not the other side's attorney's fees unless a specific statute or rule of court provides otherwise. Some tort reform advocates propose adopting a "loser pays" rule in the United States. Federal district court and Court of Appeals judges award costs to the prevailing party under Federal Rules of Civil Procedure 54.

==== U.S. federal law ====
A number of federal laws provide for an award of attorney fees for a prevailing plaintiff, such as:

- Antitrust actions
- Civil rights violations, see Civil Rights Attorney's Fees Award Act of 1976
- Class actions
- Copyright and patent cases
- Freedom of Information Act violations
- Lemon law cases
- Suits against the federal government where the position of the government was not "substantially justified"

Note that these "fee shifting" awards are a characteristic of the law enforced and do not necessarily depend upon the court in which they were brought; state courts can and do sometimes hear lawsuits brought under federal law. So if, for example, a person brings a civil rights action in state court and wins, he may be entitled to an award of attorney fees.

In some federal and state jurisdictions, statutes may authorize a 'loser pays' arrangement for specific causes of action. For example, a judge may rule in favor of a plaintiff for a specific sum 'plus all court costs and reasonable attorney fees.' However, American judges generally possess no inherent common law authority to award such fees against a losing party. Rather, any shift in fee liability must be predicated on independent statutory authority, such as civil rights or consumer protection acts, or a prevailing party provision within a valid contract (e.g., settlement agreement, arbirtation agreement, and other extrajudicial contracts) between the litigants that would stipulate a loser-pays arrangement.

==== U.S. state law ====
Most states have statutes under which attorneys' fees may be awarded to a prevailing plaintiff, such as an action on a contract where the contract contains a provision allowing recovery, or an action brought under consumer protection laws. Both plaintiffs and defendants are sometimes awarded attorneys fees in divorce and child custody actions, although this is an unusual circumstance, since such awards are made under the court's power to divide property or award alimony and child support.

A majority of states allow generally for an award to any party in a lawsuit, if another party has forced him to expend money on attorneys fees to defend against a claim utterly or substantially lacking any possible merit and brought in bad faith (frequently called "abusive litigation" or a "frivolous lawsuit"). For example, in Georgia, a trial court must award attorneys fees if a party has brought a claim "with respect to which there existed such a complete absence of any justiciable issue of law or fact that it could not be reasonably believed that a court would accept the asserted claim, defense, or other position". Meanwhile, a trial court may, but is not required to, award attorney's fees if a party has made a claim "that lacked substantial justification or...was interposed for delay or harassment, or if [the opposing party] unnecessarily expanded the proceeding by other improper conduct".

Several states have also enacted "Offer of Judgment" statutes to encourage settlement by shifting costs. A prominent example is California Code of Civil Procedure Section 998, which penalizes a party that rejects a formal settlement offer and subsequently fails to achieve a more favorable result at trial. Under this provision, the rejecting party may be barred from recovering post-offer costs and may be ordered to pay the offering party’s costs and expert witness fees. Crucially, the statute's internal logic treats attorney’s fees (when authorized by contract or separate statute) as "costs," thereby allowing a 998 offer to effectively cut off or shift significant fee liabilities that would otherwise be recoverable under the American Rule.

==== Calculating attorneys' fees ====
There are many ways of calculating prevailing-party attorney fees. Most courts recognize that actual costs may be disproportionate and inequitable. Thus, many jurisdictions rely on other calculations. Many courts or laws invoke a lodestar' calculation: reasonably expected billable hours multiplied by a reasonable hourly rate, sometimes multiplied by a factor reflecting the risk or complexity of the case. Courts in class actions frequently award fees proportionate to the damages recovered. In 2013, a federal court awarded class counsel attorneys' fees totaling over $90 million for a $1.25 billion settlement in In Re Black Farmers Discrimination Litigation. The Class Action Fairness Act of 2005, which, among other provisions, regulates the fees that can be awarded in a class action, was passed in response to concerns that courts were not adequately overseeing the award of such fees.

The overriding principle in awarding attorney's fees is reasonableness. Courts may reduce attorney's fee awards they find to be unreasonable and excessive.

== See also ==
- Costs in English law
- Criminal costs
