= American rule (attorney's fees) =

Assessment of fees arising out of litigation

Attorney's fee rules by country: English rule: Loser is expected to pay winner's all reasonable fees English rule: Loser pays winner's attorney fees based on fixed schedule or percentage At judge's discretion: fees usually awarded at least partially At judge's discretion: fees usually not awarded American rule: Winners usually pay their own attorney fees

The American rule (capitalized as American Rule in some U.S. states) is the default legal rule in the United States controlling assessment of attorneys' fees arising out of litigation. It provides that each party is responsible for paying its own attorney's fees, unless specific authority granted by statute or contract allows the assessment of those fees against the other party.

In other parts of the world, the English rule is used, under which the losing party generally pays the prevailing party's attorneys' fees.

== Exceptions ==
The American rule is merely a default rule, not the blanket rule in the United States. Many statutes at both the federal and state levels allow the winner to recover reasonable attorney's fees, and there are two major exceptions in federal case law as well.

Under Rule 54(d) of the Federal Rules of Civil Procedure, federal statutes may supersede the default rule of not awarding attorney fees. The Magnuson–Moss Warranty Act is one such federal law. 28 U.S.C. § 1927 authorizes federal courts to award attorneys' fees and expenses against any attorney who unreasonably and vexatiously multiplies a proceeding. Federal courts also possess inherent authority to assess attorney’s fees and litigation costs against a plaintiff who has acted in bad faith, vexatiously, wantonly or for oppressive reasons.

Several states also have exceptions to the American rule in both statutes and case law. For example, in California, the Consumers Legal Remedies Act allows plaintiffs to recover attorney's fees, and in insurance bad faith cases, a policyholder may be able to recover attorney's fees as a separate component of damages. Nevada Rule of Civil Procedure 68 is unique in that a party who declines a pretrial offer of judgment (essentially a settlement offer) and fails to obtain a better result at trial is liable for all reasonable attorney's fees and costs incurred by the offeror after the time the offer was given.

In May 2017, the state of Oklahoma unintentionally removed the American rule for all civil cases not involving real property. House Bill 1470 was originally intended to increase the age at which victims of child sexual abuse could sue their abusers from 20 to 45. An amendment removing the American rule was added before the bill passed both houses of the legislature and was signed into law by Governor Mary Fallin. According to the original author of the Senate's version of the bill, the amendment was initially believed to apply only to losers of civil cases involving child sexual abuse, but the scope of the amendment proved far greater than many legislators intended. Later that month, the American rule was restored.

== Rationale ==
The rationale for the American rule is that people should not be discouraged from seeking redress for perceived wrongs in court or from trying to extend coverage of the law. The rationale continues that society would suffer if a person was unwilling to pursue a meritorious claim merely because that person would have to pay the defendant's expenses if they lost.

== See also ==
- Octane Fitness, LLC v. ICON Health & Fitness, Inc.
- Olusegun Falana v. Kent State University and Alexander J. Seed
- Peter v. NantKwest, Inc. (2019)
- English rule (attorney's fees)
