= RPX Corporation =

American worldwide provider of patent risk management services

- Company type: Private
- Industry: Business & Personal Services
- Founded: 2008; 18 years ago
- Founders: John A. Amster; Geoffrey T. Barker; Eran Zur
- Headquarters: San Francisco, California
- Key people: Dan McCurdy (CEO)
- Products: RPX Insight; RPX Insurance
- Revenue: $330.4 million (2017)
- Owner: HGGC
- Number of employees: 125
- Website: www.rpxcorp.com

RPX Corporation (Rational Patent EXchange) is an American provider of international risk management services for patents. The company was founded in March 2008, and is based in San Francisco. It was incorporated on July 15, 2008. By acquiring patents that pose potential problems and providing information on litigation, RPX seeks to reduce patent assertions directed at its clients.

RPX provides a defensive patent aggregation service to mitigate clients' risk of litigation from non-practicing entities (NPEs) – also called patent trolls – which acquire patents for the sole purpose of licensing and asserting their patent rights.

RPX identifies and purchases patent assets they identify as of high value, relevance and risk that could be used offensively against members of the company's client network. Depending on the situation, RPX may acquire assets from a third party or directly from an NPE. When necessary and possible, RPX will buy patent rights out of an active litigation.

RPX promises to never assert or litigate the patents in its portfolio.

== Business ==
RPX's service is designed to mitigate members' litigation risk and costs from NPEs by purchasing patents and patent rights before patents are asserted, or to resolve an ongoing litigation.

RPX clients receive a license to all of the patents and associated rights aggregated in the RPX portfolio. Over time, RPX clients receive perpetual license to the patents held when they became members or purchased after they joined, as well as any patents sold during their membership.

The service is structured on an annual membership. Annual membership fees may increase each year to account for the growing value of the RPX portfolio, but early-joining members lock in a lower rate. Companies that join the RPX client network later receive the same benefits, but must pay the then-current rates.

RPX provides data services as part of its membership. The RPX client portal provides data related to patents and patents available for sale, historical and current patent litigation and NPEs. however the product is available only to paying RPX members, and it has yet to be seen how the RPX portal compares to other services. In May 2014, to increase transparency, the company released RPX Search, a search engine that provides free public access to most of its data, independent of RPX membership.

== History ==
RPX was founded in 2008 by John Amster, Geoffrey Barker, Eran Zur and Steven Waterhouse. The company was initially financed by Kleiner Perkins Caufield & Byers, Charles River Ventures, and Index Ventures.

In its first year, RPX generated $0.8 million revenue in that year. Revenue grew to $32.8 million in 2009, reaching profitability. In the first nine months of 2010 RPX earned $10 million in profit on $65.2 million in revenue. RPX's revenue for the year 2016 was $333.1 million.

RPX filed an S1 on January 21, 2011 and RPX began publicly trading on the Nasdaq exchange as "RPXC" in May 2011.

RPX arranged a consortium to purchase 4,000 Nortel patents from the Rockstar Consortium in December 2014.

In 2018, RPXC was acquired by private-equity firm HGGC.

In September 2024, Xockets, Inc. filed a lawsuit against RPX, Microsoft, and NVIDIA in which Xockets accused the three companies of forming a buyers' cartel to negotiate below market rates for Xockets' patented DPU technology.

== See also ==
- Defensive patent aggregation
- Patent troll
- Allied Security Trust
- Open Invention Network
