= Octane Fitness, LLC v. ICON Health & Fitness, Inc. =

- Supreme Court of the United States

Argued February 26, 2014 Decided April 29, 2014
- Full case name: Octane Fitness, LLC, Petitioner v. ICON Health & Fitness, Inc.
- Docket no.: 12-1184
- Citations: 572 U.S. 545 (more) 134 S. Ct. 1749; 188 L. Ed. 2d 816; 2014 U.S. LEXIS 3107; 82 U.S.L.W. 4330; 110 U.S.P.Q.2d 1337
- Argument: Oral argument
- Opinion announcement: Opinion announcement

Case history
- Prior: Icon Health & Fitness, Inc. v. Octane Fitness, LLC, No. 0:09-cv-00319, 2011 WL 3900975 (D. Minn. Sept. 6, 2011); affirmed, 496 F. App'x 57 (Fed. Cir. 2012); cert. granted, 134 S.Ct. 49 (2013)

Holding
- The Brooks Furniture framework—which allowed attorney-fees awards under the Patent Act in cases with "material inappropriate conduct" or cases that were "objectively baseless" and "brought in subjective bad faith" as shown by clear and convincing evidence—is unduly rigid and not to be used.

Court membership
- Chief Justice John Roberts Associate Justices Antonin Scalia · Anthony Kennedy; Clarence Thomas · Ruth Bader Ginsburg; Stephen Breyer · Samuel Alito; Sonia Sotomayor · Elena Kagan

Case opinion
- Majority: Sotomayor, joined by Roberts, Kennedy, Thomas, Ginsburg, Breyer, Alito, Kagan; Scalia (except footnotes 1–3)

Octane Fitness, LLC v. ICON Health & Fitness, Inc., 572 U.S. 545 (2014), is one of two U.S. Supreme Court decisions issued on April 29, 2014 regarding patent lawsuit fee-shifting (the other case being Highmark v. Allcare Health). The Supreme Court essentially made it easier for courts to make the loser pay for all attorney costs if the lawsuit is regarded as frivolous. In other words, "the Supreme Court's decision grants judges more leeway to crack down on baseless claims."

The decision is particularly relevant for the so-called patent trolls, which "will have to add a new variable to their calculations before pursuing a marginal lawsuit over their intellectual property: the other side's legal fees." The decision was unanimous, with the opinion written by Justice Sonia Sotomayor.

== Background ==
In the underlying litigation, ICON Health & Fitness, the manufacturer of such brands as NordicTrack and ProForm, sued Octane Fitness, a relatively small and specialized maker of elliptical trainers, for patent infringement. Octane Fitness, arguing that their elliptical products did not infringe ICON's patent, won on summary judgment and later moved for reimbursement for their attorney's fees. The district court denied the motion for attorney's fees, stating that even though Octane Fitness eventually prevailed, ICON's claims were not objectively baseless, but the Supreme Court reversed this decision.

In another case decided that term, Highmark Inc. v. Allcare Health Management System, Inc., the Supreme Court reversed and remanded with the instruction that the lower court reconsider the case in light of Octane Fitness.

== See also ==
- Fogerty v. Fantasy, Inc. (1994): awarding attorney's fees in a copyright case
- Peter v. NantKwest, Inc. (2019): awarding attorney's fees in a patent case
