= Unified Patents =

- Type: Private
- Industry: Legal services
- Founded: 2012
- Founder: Kevin Jakel
- Headquarters: San Jose, California
- Website: www.unifiedpatents.com

Unified Patents is a member-based organization whose goal is promoting innovation by protecting against frivolous patent litigation and reducing the number of non-practicing entity (NPE) patent assertions in specific technology areas.

== Background ==
Instances of NPE patent litigation have grown recently: NPEs (commonly referred to as patent trolls) accounted for the majority of patent infringement litigation in the U.S. in 2012, compared to less than a quarter in 2007. This is because NPEs can achieve a quick return on investment since most companies settle rather than fight, even if they believe the assertion to be invalid.

Unified permits small and large companies alike to become members. Smaller members act as an early warning system by notifying Unified of NPE demand letters in exchange for notifying Unified if they ever plan to sell a Patent to an NPE. Unified defines discrete technology zones for members to join, including cloud storage, content delivery, or electronic payments to ensure Unified’s deterrence is focused.

Unified also directly challenges the validity of NPE patents. By filing several inter partes reviews (IPRs) against patents owned by NPEs, Unified seeks to increase the costs that NPEs face when asserting invalid patents and to deter future NPEs from doing the same thing again. Unified also publishes monthly newsletters summarizing NPE activity against small businesses and technology companies.

== History ==
Unified Patents was founded in 2012 by Kevin Jakel and Brian Hinman. Mr. Jakel is the former head of intellectual property litigation at Intuit. Mr. Hinman formerly worked as a vice president of InterDigital. In January 2013, Unified signed its first member. Since 2012, Unified has grown to more than 60 members including NetApp and Google. Unified Patents filed its first IPR against Clouding IP's patent 6,738,799. Since then Unified has filed several IPRs against patent trolls (e.g. against PersonalWeb regarding patent 5,978,791). In June and July 2016 Unified filed IPRs on patents belonging to the three most litigious NPEs of 2016: Uniloc, Sportbrain Holdings, and Shipping & Transit LLC, who together sued more than 200 companies in 2016.

== Business ==
Unified Patents seeks to deter patent trolls from asserting poor quality patents in certain technology zones through a number of strategies. Unified collects annual fees from its members to fund its activities. Small companies are not charged by Unified. Unified assesses the risk posed by NPEs by monitoring NPE assertions. This information is used to challenge NPE owned patents. Some of Unified IPRs have already ended in settlement. Unified Patents does not pay for purchasing or licensing patents from patent trolls or NPEs.
