= Patent troll =

Pejorative term related to intellectual property

In international law and business, patent trolling or patent hoarding is a categorical or pejorative term applied to a person or company that attempts to enforce patent rights against accused infringers far beyond the patent's actual value or contribution to the prior art, often through hardball legal tactics (frivolous litigation, vexatious litigation, strategic lawsuits against public participation (SLAPP), chilling effects, etc.). Patent trolls often do not manufacture products or supply services based upon the patents in question. However, some entities (such as universities and national laboratories) that do not practice their asserted patent may yet not be considered "patent trolls" when they license their patented technologies on reasonable terms in advance.

Other related concepts include patent holding company (PHC), patent monetization entity (PME), patent assertion entity (PAE), and non-practicing entity (NPE), which may or may not be considered a "patent troll" depending on the position they are taking and the perception of that position by the public. While in most cases the entities termed "trolls" are operating within the bounds of the legal system, their aggressive tactics achieve outcomes contrary to the origins of the patent system, as a legislated social contract to foster and protect innovation; the rapid rise of the modern information economy has put the global intellectual property system under more strain.

Patent trolling has been less of a problem in Europe than in the United States because Europe has a "loser pays costs" regime. In contrast, the US generally employs the American rule, under which each party is responsible for paying its own attorney's fees. However, after the US Supreme Court's decision in Octane Fitness, LLC v. ICON Health & Fitness, Inc. on April 29, 2014, it is now easier for courts to award costs for frivolous patent lawsuits.

== Etymology and definition ==
The term patent troll was used at least once in 1993, albeit with a slightly different meaning, to describe countries that file aggressive patent lawsuits. The 1994 educational video, The Patents Video also used the term, depicting a green troll guarding a bridge and demanding fees. The origin of the term patent troll has also been variously attributed to Anne Gundelfinger, or Peter Detkin, both counsel for Intel, during the late 1990s.

Patent troll is currently a controversial term, susceptible to numerous definitions, none of which are considered satisfactory from the perspective of understanding how patent trolls should be treated in law. Definitions often include a party that does one or more of the following:

- Purchases a patent, often from a bankrupt firm, and then sues another company by claiming that one of its products infringes on the purchased patent;
- Enforces patents against purported infringers without itself intending to manufacture the patented product or supply the patented service; (some argue this could be true even for the original inventor, whereas others draw a clear distinction on this point)
- Enforces patents but has no manufacturing or research base;
- Focuses its efforts solely on enforcing patent rights; or
- Asserts patent infringement claims against non-copiers or against a large industry that is composed of non-copiers.

The term "patent pirate" has been used to describe both patent trolling and acts of patent infringement. Related expressions are "non-practising entity" (NPE) (defined as "a patent owner who does not manufacture or use the patented invention, but rather than abandoning the right to exclude, an NPE seeks to enforce its right through the negotiation of licenses and litigation"), "patent assertion entity" (PAE), "non-manufacturing patentee", "patent shark", "patent marketer", "patent assertion company", and "patent dealer".

Confusion over the usage of the term "patent troll" is clear in research and media reporting. In 2014, PricewaterhouseCoopers published research into patent litigation including a study of non-practicing entities including individual inventors and non-profit organizations such as universities. In quoting that research, media outlets such as The Washington Post labeled all non-practicing entities as patent trolls.

== Legal and regulatory history ==
According to RPX Corporation, a firm that helps reduce company patent-litigation risk by offering licenses to patents it owns in exchange for an agreement not to sue, patent trolls in 2012 filed more than 2,900 infringement lawsuits in the US (nearly six times higher than the number in 2006).

In addressing the America Invents Act (AIA) passed by Congress in September 2011 reforming US patent law, US President Barack Obama said in February 2013 that US "efforts at patent reform only went about halfway to where we need to go." The next indicated step was to pull together stakeholders and find consensus on "smarter patent laws."

As part of the effort to combat patent trolls, the Patent Trial and Appeals Board was empowered to begin conducting the inter partes review (IPR) process in 2012. IPR allows an executive agency to review the validity of a patent, whereas previously such a review could only be conducted before a court. In 2018, the Supreme Court upheld the constitutionality of the IPR process in Oil States Energy Services, LLC v. Greene's Energy Group, LLC. In 2015, 45% of all patent cases in the United States were filed in the Eastern District of Texas in Marshall, and 28% of all patents were filed before James Rodney Gilstrap, a court known for favoring plaintiffs and for its expertise in patent suits. However, in May 2017, the Supreme Court of the United States ruled unanimously in TC Heartland LLC v. Kraft Foods Group Brands LLC that patent litigation cases must be heard in the state in which the defendant is incorporated, shutting down this option for plaintiffs.

On June 4, 2013, President Obama referenced patent trolls and directed the United States Patent and Trademark Office (USPTO) to take five new actions to help stem the surge in patent-infringement lawsuits tying up the court system. Saying "they don't actually produce anything themselves, they're just trying to essentially leverage and hijack somebody else's idea and see if they can extort some money out of them," the President ordered the USPTO to require companies to be more specific about exactly what their patent covers and how it is being infringed.

The Administration further stated the USPTO will tighten scrutiny of patent claims that appear overly broad, and will aim to curb patent-infringement lawsuits against consumers and small-business owners using off-the-shelf technology. The President asked Congress to enact legislation to more aggressively curb "abusive" lawsuits. David Kravets said "[t]he history ebooks will remember the 44th president for setting off a chain of reforms that made predatory patent lawsuits a virtual memory."

In the US Congress, Senator Orrin Hatch (R-Utah) sponsored legislation in 2013 intended to reduce the incidence of patent trolling. The bill, called the Patent Litigation Integrity Act, would help judges make patent trolls pay for the cost of the lawsuits, especially if the trolls lost the lawsuits.

In February 2014, Apple Inc. filed two amicus briefs for cases pending in the US Supreme Court, claiming to be the #1 target for patent trolls, having faced nearly 100 lawsuits in the preceding three years.

In November 2014, the US Federal Trade Commission (FTC) settled its first consumer-protection lawsuit against a company, for using "deceptive sales claims and phony legal threats". The FTC found that defendant MPHJ Technology Investments LLC had sent letters to more than 16,000 small to mid-size businesses threatening patent infringement lawsuits if the companies did not comply with its demand for licensing fees of $1,000 to $1,200 per employee, but never making preparations for such lawsuits. The 2014 settlement provided for a $16,000 fine per letter that MPHJ or its attorneys would send.

=== State responses in the United States ===
In May 2013, Vermont's Consumer Protection Act took effect. The Vermont law prohibits bad faith infringement threats, with bad faith indicated by: lack of specificity of the alleged infringement, settlement demands or damage claims that include excessive licensing fees, and unreasonably short deadlines for payment of demanded money. Vermont's statute gives recipients of threat letters the right to counter-sue in state court, thus making it a less lucrative business model to send out large numbers of threat letters. As of August 2013, the Vermont legislation had not been tested in court as to violation of federal preemption, the legal principle that bars states from interfering in matters regulated or administrated by the federal government (such as aviation), or enforcement of federal law.

In August 2013, Nebraska's attorney general sent warnings to a patent troll's law firm, asserting that to send frivolous licensing demands to Nebraska businesses may constitute unfair and deceptive business practices and violate Nebraska's unfair competition law.

In 2013, Minnesota's attorney general obtained a settlement prohibiting MPHJ Technology Investments LLC from continuing its licensing campaign, Minnesota said to be the first state to obtain such a settlement.

In April 2014, the Wisconsin governor signed legislation that would make patent-trolling Wisconsin companies more difficult. The legislation imposes strict notification duties on the entity claiming infringement, and there are potentially strict penalties for non-compliance with the notification process.

In the 2014, legislative session, Idaho Lieutenant Governor Brad Little sponsored Senate Bill 1354, or the "Patent-troll" bill which protected companies from "bad faith assertions of patent infringement", in which a patent holder frequently harasses businesses for purportedly infringing on a patent in order to collect an extortionate licensing fee.

== Causes ==
The cost of defending against a patent infringement suit in Texas, as of 2004, was typically $1 million or more before trial, and $2.5 million for a complete defense, even if successful. Because the costs and risks are high, defendants may settle even non-meritorious suits they consider frivolous for several hundred thousand dollars. The uncertainty and unpredictability of the outcome of jury trials in the United States also encourages settlement.

It has been suggested that examination backlog, which does not give patent examiners sufficient time to examine patent applications, but rather favors speedy issuance of invalid or partially invalid patents, facilitates patent trolling.

There is also no obligation to defend an unused patent immediately, thus manufacturing companies may produce the patented product for years until the patent troll sues them. For example, the JPEG format, intended to be free of license fees, was subject to two patent-based attacks, one by Forgent Networks during 2002–2006 and another by Global Patent Holdings during 2007–2009. Both patents were eventually invalidated based on prior art, but before this, Forgent collected more than $100 million in license fees from 30 companies and sued 31 other companies.

== Effects ==
In 2011, United States business entities incurred $29 billion in direct costs because of patent trolls. Lawsuits brought by "patent assertion companies" made up 61% of all patent cases in 2012, according to the Santa Clara University School of Law. From 2009 through mid-2013, Apple Inc. was the defendant in 171 lawsuits brought by non-practicing entities (NPEs), followed by Hewlett-Packard (137), Samsung (133), AT&T (127), and Dell (122). Patent troll-instigated litigation, once mostly confined to large companies in patent-dependent industries such as pharmaceuticals, came to involve companies of all sizes in a wide variety of industries. In 2005, patent trolls sued 800 small firms (those with less than $100 million annual revenue), the number growing to nearly 2,900 such firms in 2011; the median defendant's annual revenue was $10.3 million. A July 2014 PricewaterhouseCoopers study concluded that non-practicing entities (NPEs) accounted for 67 percent of all patent lawsuits filed—up from 28 percent five years earlier—and though the median monetary award size has shrunk over time, the median number of awards to NPEs was three times higher than those of practicing companies.

A 2014 study from Harvard University, Harvard Business School and the University of Texas concluded that firms forced to pay patent trolls reduce R&D spending, averaging $211 million less than firms having won a lawsuit against a troll. That 2014 study also found that trolls tend to sue firms with fewer attorneys on staff, in effect encouraging firms to invest in legal representation at the expense of technology development. The 2014 study reported that trolls tend to opportunistically sue firms with more available cash, even if the firm's available cash was not earned in the technology that is the subject of the patent lawsuit, and targeting the firms long before a product begins turning a profit, thus disincentivizing investment in new technologies.

Emphasis became progressively focused on patents covering software rather than chemical or mechanical inventions, given the difficulty in defining the scope of software patent claims in comparison to the more easily defined specific compounds in chemical patents. A GAO study concluded that the proportion of patent lawsuits initiated by trolls hadn't changed significantly from 2007 through 2011, the GAO speculating that the raw numerical increase in both troll and non-troll instituted lawsuits may be due to the "inherently imprecise" language and a lack of common, standardized, scientific vocabulary in constantly evolving emerging technologies such as software. Software patents were described as "particularly prone" to abuse because software is "inherently conceptual", with research indicating that a software patent is four times as likely as a chemical patent to be involved in litigation, and a software "business method patent" is thirteen times more likely to be litigated.

On June 4, 2013, the National Economic Council and Council of Economic Advisers released a report entitled Patent Assertion and U.S. Innovation that found significant harm to the economy from such entities and made recommendations to address them. The report further stated: "Specific policies should focus on fostering clearer patents with a high standard of novelty and non-obviousness, reducing disparity in the costs of litigation for patent owners and technology users, and increasing the adaptability of the innovation system to challenges posed by new technologies and new business models, would likely have a similar effect today."

A core criticism of patent trolls is that "they are in a position to negotiate licensing fees that are grossly out of alignment with their contribution to the alleged infringer's product or service", notwithstanding their non-practising status or the possible weakness of their patent claims. The risk of paying high prices for after-the-fact licensing of patents they were not aware of, and the costs for extra vigilance for competing patents that might have been issued, in turn increases the costs and risks of manufacturing.

On the other hand, the ability to buy, sell and license patents is seen by some as generally productive. The Wall Street Journal argued that by creating a secondary market for patents, these activities make the ownership of patents more liquid, thereby creating incentives to innovate and patent. Patent Licensing Entities also argue that aggregating patents in the hands of specialized licensing companies facilitates access to technology by more efficiently organizing ownership of patent rights.

In an interview conducted in 2011, former US federal judge Paul R. Michel regarded "the 'problem' [of non-practicing entities, the so-called "patent trolls"] to be greatly exaggerated." Although there are a number of problems with the US patent system, i.e. "most NPE infringement suits are frivolous because the defendant plainly does not infringe or the patent is invalid", "patent infringement suits are very slow and expensive", and "NPEs may add value to the patents by buying them up when manufacturers decline to do so. Inventors may have benefited from the developing market in patent acquisition."

This view was supported in an article in 2014 that suggests that the pejorative term patent troll works in the benefit of large organizations who infringe patents and resent smaller inventors being represented by someone with the clout to take them on. The argument against the use of the term is that NPEs, in the main, return the majority of a settlement to the original inventor. Similarly, New York Times columnist Joe Nocera wrote that legislation on patent reforms considered by the United States Congress that are "allegedly aimed at trolls" often instead "effectively tilt the playing field even further towards big companies with large lobby budget".

== Mechanics ==
Patent trolls operate much like any other company that is protecting and aggressively exploiting a patent portfolio. However, their focus is on obtaining additional money from existing uses, not from seeking out new applications for the technology. They monitor the market for possibly infringing technologies by watching popular products, news coverage and analysis. They also review published patent applications for signs that another company is developing infringing technology, possibly unaware of their own patents. They then develop a plan for how to proceed. They may start by suing a particularly vulnerable company that has much to lose, or little money to defend itself, hoping that an early victory or settlement will establish a precedent to encourage other peer companies to acquiesce to licenses. Alternately they may attack an entire industry at once, hoping to overwhelm it.

An individual case often begins with a perfunctory infringement complaint, or even a mere threat of suit, which is often enough to encourage settlement for the nuisance or "threat value" of the suit by purchasing a license to the patent. In the United States, patent suits previously could be filed in any United States District Court, allowing plaintiffs to "shop around" to find the court with the highest chances of success; in 2015, 45% of all patent cases were filed in the Eastern District of Texas in Marshall, as this court was known for favoring plaintiffs and for its expertise in patent suits. However, the Supreme Court of the United States ruled in a unanimous May 2017 decision in TC Heartland LLC v. Kraft Foods Group Brands LLC that patent litigation cases must be heard in the state which the defendant is incorporated, shutting down this option for plaintiffs.

The uncertainty and unpredictability of the outcome of jury trials also encourages settlement. If it wins, the plaintiff is entitled as damages an award of at least a "reasonable" royalty determined according to the norms of the field of the patented invention.

When compared to patent owners, who actually use the patent in question, the enforcement rights of patent trolls are more limited. First, patent owners who make and sell their invention are entitled to awards of lost profits. However, patent trolls, being non-manufacturers, typically do not qualify.

Further, patent owners' rights to bar infringers from manufacture, use, or sale of technologies that infringe their patents has been curtailed in the 2006 court decision eBay v. MercExchange. Rather than automatically granting an injunction, the US Supreme Court stated that courts must apply a standard reasonableness test to determine if an injunction is warranted. Writing in Forbes about the impact of this case on patent trolls, writer Jessica Holzer concludes: "The high court's decision deals a blow to patent trolls, which are notorious for using the threat of permanent injunction to extort hefty fees in licensing negotiations as well as huge settlements from companies they have accused of infringing. Often, those settlements can be far greater than the value of the infringing technology: Recall the $612.5 million that Canada's Research in Motion forked over to patent-holding company NTP, Inc., to avoid the shutting down of its popular BlackBerry service."

The non-manufacturing status of a patent troll has a strategic advantage, in that the target infringer cannot counter-sue for infringement. In litigation between businesses who make, use or sell patented technology, the defendant will often use its own patent portfolio as a basis to file a counterclaim for infringement. The counterclaim becomes an incentive for settlement, and in many industries, discourages patent infringement suits. Additionally, a patent suit carries with it the threat of an injunction or mutual injunction, which could shut down manufacturing or other business operations. If a patent owner does not make, use or sell technology, then the possibility of a counter-suit for infringement would not exist. For this reason, a patent troll is able to enforce patents against large companies which have substantial patent portfolios of their own. Furthermore, patent trolls may use shell companies.

== Responses to patent trolls ==
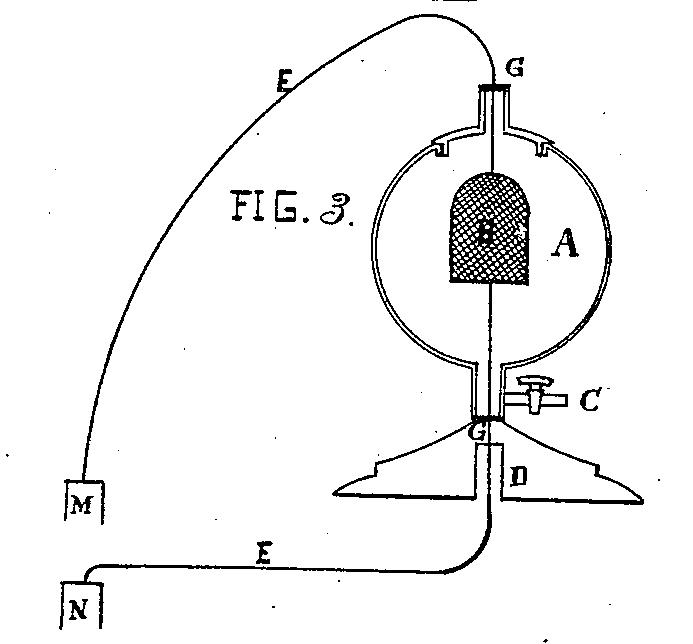
Early Woodward light bulb patent purchased by Thomas Edison to preclude challenges

Patent trolls are neither using nor marketing the inventions covered by their patents, but instead plan to make money by threatening or filing lawsuits. Using the justice system to make money gives patent trolls a financial advantage because patent troll plaintiffs are typically immune from defense strategies large business employ against legitimate smaller patent plaintiffs (e.g., litigation costs are significantly higher for the defendant or infringer than for a purported damaged plaintiff who has a "no recovery, no fee" contingency-fee lawyer; until recently trolls had an almost-unrestricted ability to choose plaintiff-friendly forums, frequently the Eastern District of Texas).

Strategies used by companies to protect themselves from legitimate competition are ineffective against patent trolls. Defensive techniques include: monitoring patent activities of competitors to avoid infringing patents (since patent trolls are not competitors, productive companies usually have no way to find out about the troll or its patents until after significant investments have been made to produce and market a product); going on the offensive with counterclaims that accuse the patent plaintiff of infringing patents owned by the defendant (the mutual threat often leads the parties to arrive at a mutually beneficial cross-licensing arrangement); or a "scorched earth" defense designed to drive up litigation costs (which is equally ineffective because patent trolls plan for and have the finances to fully litigate a case; in fact, some are able to draw on hedge funds and institutional investors to finance their patent cases). Patent "pooling" arrangements where many companies collaborate to bring their patented knowledge together to create new products are also inapplicable to patent trolls because they do not produce products. It is possible to perform offensive techniques to ward off patent trolls with the open source release of concepts preemptively via patentleft license to prevent patent trolls from establishing intellectual property on building block technology. A Google-led initiative, LOT Network, was formed in 2014 to combat PAEs by cross-licensing patents that fall into the hands of enforcers. Another Google-affiliated organization, Unified Patents, seeks to reduce the number and effectiveness of patent trolls by filing inter partes reviews (IPR) on patents owned by trolls.

Large companies who use patent litigation as a competitive tool risk losing their patent rights if a defendant claims patent misuse. However, the misuse defense is difficult against a patent troll because antitrust violations typically involved require significant market power on the part of the patent holder. Nevertheless, manufacturers do use various tactics to limit their exposure to patent trolls. Most have broader uses as well for defending their technologies against competitors. These include:

- Design arounds can be a defense against patent trolls. The amount of license fee that a patent troll can demand is limited by the alternative of the cost of designing around the troll's patent(s).
- Patent watch. Companies routinely monitor new patents and patent applications, most of which are published, to determine if any are relevant to their business activities.
- Clearance search. A standard practice is to perform a clearance search for patents or pending patent applications that cover important features of a potential product, before its initial development or commercial introduction. For example, a search by Thomas Edison uncovered a prior patent by two Canadian inventors, Henry Woodward and Mathew Evans, for carbon filament in a non-oxidizing environment, (U.S. patent 181,613), the type of light bulb Edison wanted to develop. Edison bought the patent for US$5,000 ($166,810 in present-day terms) to eliminate the possibility of a later challenge by Woodward and Evans.
- Opposition proceeding. In Europe (under the European Patent Convention), any person may initiate proceedings to oppose a European patent. There is a more limited process in the United States, known as a reexamination. As an example, Research In Motion, filed reexaminations against broad NTP, Inc. patents related to BlackBerry technology.
- Litigation. Whereas some companies acquiesce to a troll's demands, others go on the offensive by challenging the patents themselves, for example by finding prior art that calls into question their patentability. They may also broadly challenge whether the technology in question is infringing, or attempt to show patent misuse. If successful, such a defense not only wins the case at hand but destroys the patent troll's underlying ability to sue. Knowing this, the patent troll may back down or lessen its demands.
- Early settlement. An early settlement is often far less expensive than litigation costs and later settlement values.
- Patent infringement insurance. Insurance is available to help protect companies from inadvertently infringing a third party's patents.
- Defensive patent aggregation, the practice of purchasing patents or patent rights from patent holders so they don't end up in the hands of an individual or enterprise that can assert them. Increasingly aggregations are focused on purchasing patents and patent rights off the open market, or out of NPE assertion and litigation, which directly impact the businesses of the aggregation's members. The aggregator then provides members a broad license to everything it owns in exchange for an annual fixed-fee. Defensive aggregators purchased 15% of all brokered patent sales in 2014.
- Action for unjustified threats. In Australia, the UK and other countries, a legal action may be brought against anyone who makes unjustifiable threats to begin patent infringement proceedings. Concerning the Australian threats provisions, Lisa L. Mueller says that "if a patent troll is found to have engaged in a threat, the only way it could defend itself against an injunction or an award of monetary damages would be to commence patent infringement proceedings and have the court find that infringement occurred."
- Bounties. Monetary bounties have been offered to the public to find prior art or provide other information, such as arguments showing the obviousness or material defects in a patent application, that would invalidate a patent troll's patents. This tactic has been used not only against the patent in question but also against other patents held by the patent troll in order to undermine its business model.

== See also ==
- Copyright troll
- Cybersquatting
- Patent monetization
- Patent privateer
- Patent war
- Rent-seeking
- Stick licensing
- Strike suit
- Submarine patent
- Trademark troll
- Wright brothers patent war
