= Solicitor General of Michigan =

American state position

- Incumbent; Ann Sherman since 2023
- Michigan Department of Attorney General
- Reports to: Michigan Attorney General
- Constituting instrument: MCL 14.28
- First holder: Edmund E. Shepherd
- Deputy: Deputy Michigan Solicitor General
- Website: State of Michigan: AG – Solicitor General Bureau

The Michigan Solicitor General or Solicitor General of Michigan is the top appellate lawyer for the State of Michigan. It is an appointed position in the Office of the Michigan Attorney General, with supervision over all of the office's major appellate cases and amici briefs. The majority of the matters that the Solicitor General handles are argued in the United States Supreme Court and the Michigan Supreme Court, although the Solicitor General is also responsible for Michigan's filings in the United States Court of Appeals for the Sixth Circuit, Michigan's appellate courts, and other federal and state appellate courts. On January 15, 2019, Michigan Attorney General Dana Nessel named Fadwa A. Hammoud Michigan Solicitor General.

== Creation ==
The office of Michigan Solicitor General was created in 1939 and is modeled after the United States Solicitor General. The position is codified in Michigan Compiled Laws Section 14.28.

== List of Solicitors ==
The current Michigan Solicitor General is Ann Sherman.

Years	Michigan Solicitor General	Michigan Attorney General
1941–1957	Edmund E. Shepherd	Herbert J. Rushton; John R. Dethmers; Foss O. Eldred; Eugene F. Black; Stephen John Roth; Frank G. Millard; Thomas M. Kavanagh
1957–1961	Samuel J. Torina	Paul L. Adams
1961–1962	Joseph B. Bilitzke	Frank J. Kelley
1962–1962	Eugene Krasicky	Frank J. Kelley
1963–1982	Robert A. Derengoski	Frank J. Kelley
1982–1990	Louis J. Caruso	Frank J. Kelley
1990–1992	Gay Secor Hardy	Frank J. Kelley
1992–2008	Thomas L. Casey	Frank J. Kelley; Jennifer M. Granholm; Mike Cox
2008–2011	B. Eric Restuccia	Mike Cox
2011–2013	John J. Bursch	Bill Schuette
2013–2019	Aaron Lindstrom	Bill Schuette
2019–2023	Fadwa A. Hammoud	Dana Nessel
2023–present	Ann Sherman	Dana Nessel
