= Michigan v. Bay Mills Indian Community =

- Supreme Court of the United States

Argued December 2, 2013 Decided May 27, 2014
- Full case name: Michigan, Petitioner v. Bay Mills Indian Community et al.
- Docket no.: 12-515
- Citations: 572 U.S. 782 (more) 134 S. Ct. 2024; 188 L. Ed. 2d 1071
- Argument: Oral argument
- Opinion announcement: Opinion announcement

Case history
- Prior: 695 F.3d 406 (6th Cir. 2012) (affirmed)
- Subsequent: On remand, Bay Mills Indian Community v. Snyder, 720 F. App'x 754 (6th Cir. 2018)

Holding
- Tribal sovereign immunity bars a lawsuit brought by the state against gaming off of Indian lands.

Court membership
- Chief Justice John Roberts Associate Justices Antonin Scalia · Anthony Kennedy; Clarence Thomas · Ruth Bader Ginsburg; Stephen Breyer · Samuel Alito; Sonia Sotomayor · Elena Kagan

Case opinions
- Majority: Kagan, joined by Roberts, Kennedy, Breyer, Sotomayor
- Concurrence: Sotomayor
- Dissent: Scalia
- Dissent: Thomas, joined by Scalia, Ginsburg, Alito
- Dissent: Ginsburg

Laws applied
- Indian Gaming Regulatory Act

Michigan v. Bay Mills Indian Community, 572 U.S. 782 (2014), was a United States Supreme Court case examining whether a federal court has jurisdiction over activity that violates the Indian Gaming Regulatory Act but takes place off Indian lands, and, if so, whether tribal sovereign immunity prevents a state from suing in federal court. In a 5–4 decision, the Court held that the State of Michigan's suit against Bay Mills is barred by tribal immunity.

== Background ==
In 1988, Congress enacted the Indian Gaming Regulatory Act (IGRA) to establish the jurisdictional framework which governs Indian gaming and created three classes of gaming. Class III gaming, which is the most highly regulated and the class involved in this case, includes casino gaming, horse racing, and slot machines. A tribe may conduct gaming operations pursuant to a compact entered into with a state. IGRA allows a state to bring a suit against a tribe for certain compact violations, including gaming on Indian lands in violation of an effective compact. The compact between Michigan and the Bay Mills Indian Community was approved by the Department of the Interior's Bureau of Indian Affairs on November 19, 1993, and the tribe operated gaming in the Upper Peninsula.

In 2010, using accrued interest from federal appropriations, the tribe purchased land near Vanderbilt, in the Lower Peninsula, and claimed authority to operate a casino there. The state filed suit in federal court and the Interior Department opined that the use of the land trust funds to purchase the land did not convert it to Indian territory. The court enjoined the tribe against opening a casino. The Sixth Circuit vacated the injunction holding that tribal immunity barred Michigan's suit against Bay Mills unless Congress provided otherwise.

== Supreme Court ==
The case was argued before the Court on December 2, 2013. John J. Bursch, then the Michigan Solicitor General, argued for the petitioner, and Neal Kumar Katyal argued for the respondent. Deputy Solicitor General Edwin Kneedler argued for the United States as amicus curiae.

=== Opinion and Concurrence ===
Justice Elena Kagan delivered the Opinion of the Court affirming the decision of the Sixth Circuit. The majority included Chief Justice Roberts, and Justices Kennedy, Breyer, and Sotomayor.

The question in this case is whether tribal sovereign immunity bars Michigan’s suit against the Bay Mills Indian Community for opening a casino outside Indian lands. We hold that immunity protects Bay Mills from this legal action. Congress has not abrogated tribal sovereign immunity from a State’s suit to enjoin gaming off a reservation or other Indian lands. And we decline to revisit our prior decisions holding that, absent such an abrogation (or a waiver), Indian tribes have immunity even when a suit arises from off-reservation commercial activity. Michigan must therefore resort to other mechanisms, including legal actions against the responsible individuals, to resolve this dispute.

— Justice Kagan

Justice Kagan begins by exploring the concept of Indian tribes being "domestic dependent nations" exercising "inherent sovereign authority" subject to the plenary authority of Congress. Quoting the Court's ruling in Santa Clara Pueblo v. Martinez, Kagan notes that tribes enjoy immunity from suits which are traditionally enjoyed by other sovereign powers which is a "necessary corollary to Indian sovereignty and self-governance."

Kagan goes on to explain why the IGRA does not apply here, citing its provision that a state may bring suit to enjoin tribal gaming on Indian lands in violation of an effective compact, but may not do so off Indian lands, which applies to the Vanderbilt property. While Michigan argued that the Court should "correct" this anomaly, it declines to do so. The opinion points out that Michigan could utilize its own statutory provisions and procedures to take action which may be in violation of state law (such as denying a license to Bay Mills for an off-reservation casino, and bringing suit against the tribe if it went ahead anyway).

The opinion concludes by relying on the doctrine of stare decisis, relying on and citing its prior decision in Kiowa Tribe of Oklahoma v. Manufacturing Technologies, Inc. (1998), reaffirms that the "doctrine of tribal immunity is settled law and controls this case." It is ultimately Congress' job "to determine whether or how to limit tribal immunity" and "[t]he special brand of sovereignty the tribes retain...rests in the hands of Congress."

Justice Sotomayor filed a concurring opinion detailing why history and courtesy advise against limiting tribal sovereign immunity. Indian tribes existed before the United States as "self-governing sovereign political communities," and "have not given up their full sovereignty" they retain their sovereignty and powers absent congressional acts to the contrary. She cites Cherokee Nation v. Georgia (1831), in which the Court ruled that tribes are not foreign states and that "[t]he condition of the Indians in relation to the United States is perhaps unlike that of any other two people in existence", concluding that 200 years of jurisprudence are against treating the tribes like foreign visitors in United States courts.

=== Dissents ===
Justice Scalia filed a dissent contending that the Court's ruling in Kiowa was wrongly decided and that "stare decisis does not recommend its retention."

Justice Thomas, joined by Justices Scalia, Ginsburg, and Alito, additionally contends that Kiowa was "error," and that "[s]uch an expansion of tribal immunity is unsupported by any rational basis for that doctrine, inconsistent with the limits on tribal sovereignty, and an affront to state sovereignty." He further argues that the immunity a tribe may claim in court is because the law provides it, not because it is inherently entitled to it as a sovereign, later citing Kiowa that the Court "has taken the lead in drawing the bounds of tribal immunity" and that any asserted deference to Congress "was a fiction and remains an enigma." Thomas goes on to assert that stare decisis may sometimes be "the preferred course," but it is "not an inexorable command." Because of the increase in commercial activity undertaken by tribes, and, thus, the limitation and even extinguishing of states' "ability to protect their citizens and enforce the law against tribal businesses," Thomas argues that stare decisis is inappropriate in this case.

Justice Ginsburg dissented on the basis that no brand of "immoderate, judicially confirmed immunity...will have staying power."
