= 1974 Michigan Attorney General election =

- November 5, 1974
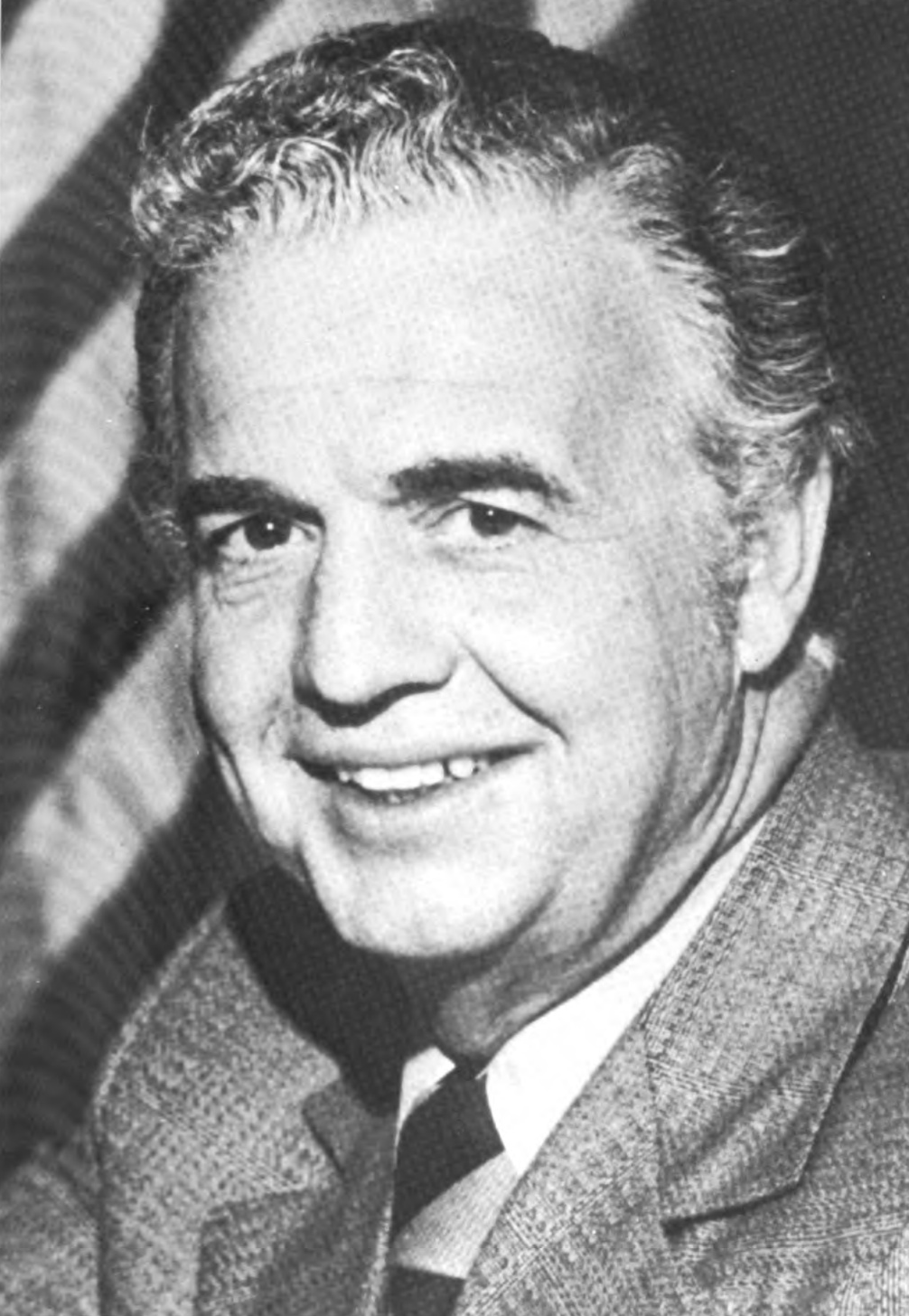

Nominee	Frank J. Kelley	Myron H. Wahls Sr.
Party	Democratic	Republican
Popular vote	1,739,466	736,975
Percentage	69.15%	29.30%
- County results Kelley: 50–60% 60–70% 70–80% Wahls: 50–60%
Attorney General before election
Frank J. Kelley
Democratic
Elected Attorney General
Frank J. Kelley
Democratic

The 1974 Michigan attorney general election was held on November 5, 1974, in order to elect the attorney general of Michigan. Democratic nominee and incumbent Attorney General Frank J. Kelley won re-election against Republican nominee Myron H. Wahls Sr., American Independent nominee Ray D. Markel and Human Rights nominee Clarice Jobes.

== General election ==
On election day, November 5, 1978, Democratic nominee Frank J. Kelley won re-election by a margin of 1,002,491 votes against his foremost opponent, Republican nominee Myron H. Wahls Sr., thereby retaining Democratic control over the office of attorney general. Kelley was sworn in for his fifth term on January 1, 1975.

=== Results ===
Michigan Attorney General election, 1974
Party	Candidate	Votes	%
Democratic	Frank J. Kelley (incumbent)	1,739,466	69.15
Republican	Myron H. Wahls Sr.	736,975	29.30
American Independent	Ray D. Markel	20,970	0.82
Human Rights	Clarice Jobes	18,239	0.73
Write-ins		24	0.00
Total votes		2,515,674	100.00
Democratic hold			
