= 1972 United States Senate election in Michigan =

- November 7, 1972
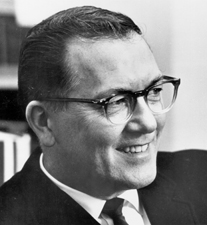

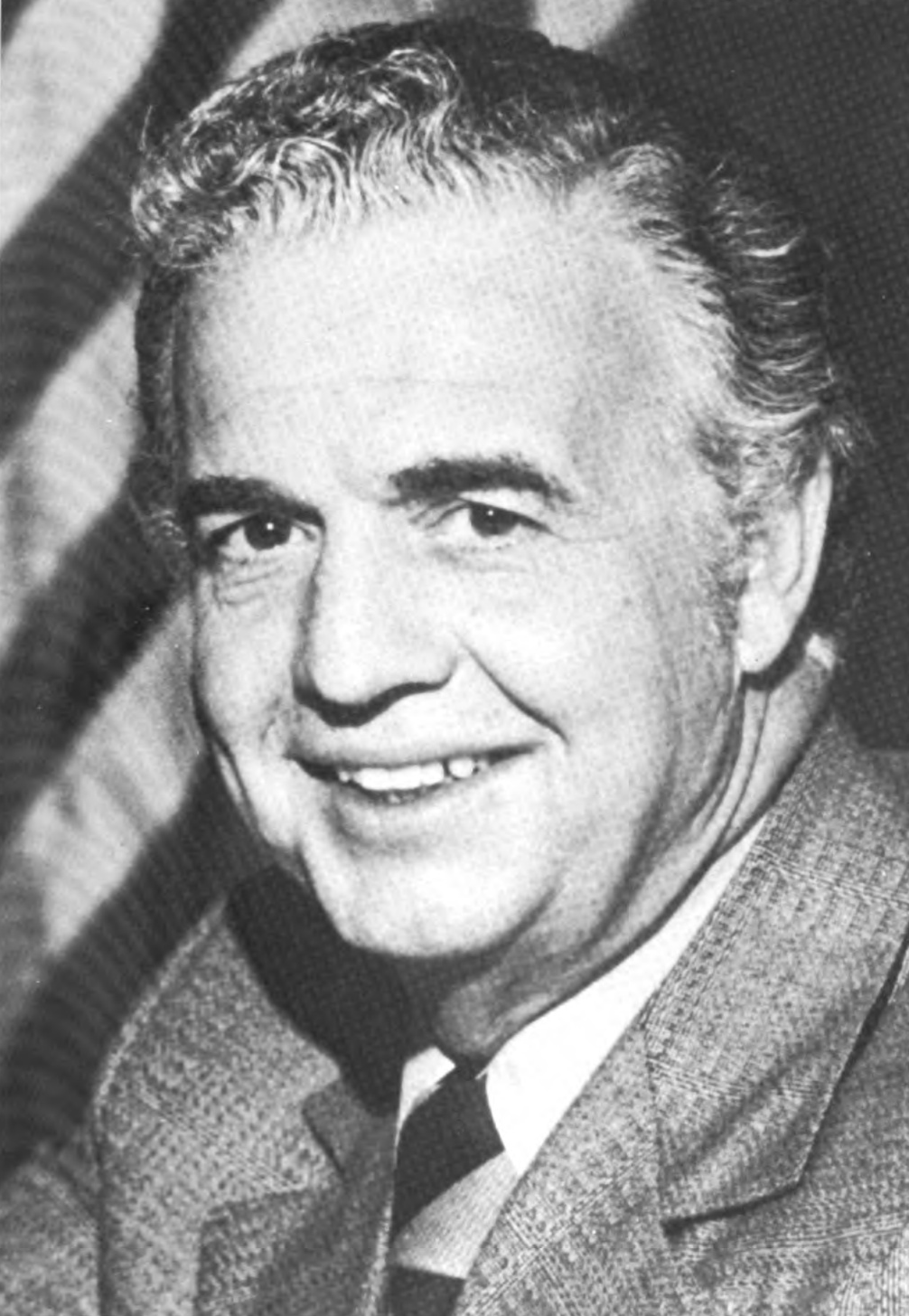
Nominee	Robert P. Griffin	Frank J. Kelley
Party	Republican	Democratic
Popular vote	1,781,065	1,577,178
Percentage	52.28%	46.29%
- County results Griffin: 50–60% 60–70% 70–80% Kelley: 40–50% 50–60%
U.S. senator before election
Robert P. Griffin
Republican
Elected U.S. Senator
Robert P. Griffin
Republican

The 1972 United States Senate election in Michigan was held on November 7, 1972. Incumbent Republican U.S. Senator and Senate Minority Whip Robert P. Griffin won a second full term against Democratic nominee and Michigan Attorney General Frank J. Kelley by 6%. Despite President Richard Nixon’s landslide victory in Michigan and the rest of the country, Griffin’s margin of victory decreased from the previous election. Following his defeat in this election, Kelley continued to serve as Michigan's state attorney general until he left office in 1999.

As of 2026, this was the last time that the Republicans have won Michigan's Class 2 Senate seat, as well as the last time that a Republican won re-election to either Senate seat in Michigan. Since this election, Republicans have only won one more Michigan U.S. Senate race, in 1994.

== General election ==
=== Candidates ===
- Thomas D. Dennis Jr. (Communist)
- Patrick V. Dillinger (American Independent)
- Robert P. Griffin, incumbent U.S. senator since 1967 (Republican)
- Barbara Halpert (Human Rights)
- Frank J. Kelley, Michigan attorney general (Democratic)
- Linda Norquist (Socialist Workers)
- James Sim (Socialist Labor)

=== Results ===
General election results
Party	Candidate	Votes	%	±%
Republican	Robert P. Griffin (incumbent)	1,781,065	52.28%	▼3.62
Democratic	Frank J. Kelley	1,577,178	46.29%	▲2.44
American Independent	Patrick V. Dillinger	23,121	0.68%	N/A
Human Rights	Barbara Halpert	19,118	0.56%	N/A
Socialist Workers	Linda Norquist	2,389	0.07%	N/A
Socialist Labor	James Sim	2,127	0.06%	▼0.19
Communist	Thomas D. Dennis Jr.	1,908	0.06%	N/A
Write-in		52	0.00	
Total votes		3,406,958	100.00%	

== See also ==
- 1972 United States Senate elections
