= 2000 Oakland County Executive election =

- November 7, 2000

Nominee	L. Brooks Patterson	Gary Kohut
Party	Republican	Democratic
Popular vote	320,589	203,016
Percentage	59.33%	37.57%
Oakland County Executive before election
L. Brooks Patterson
Republican
Elected Oakland County Executive
L. Brooks Patterson
Republican

The 2000 Oakland County Executive election was held on November 7, 2000. Incumbent County Executive L. Brooks Patterson ran for re-election to a third term. He won the Republican primary uncontested and faced Gary Kohut, the Chairman of the county Democratic Party, in the general election. Patterson won the election in a landslide, receiving 59 percent of the vote to Kohut's 38 percent and Libertarian Paul Champion's 3 percent.

== Democratic primary ==
=== Candidates ===
- Gary Kohut, Chairman of the Oakland County Democratic Party

=== Results ===
Democratic primary results
Party	Candidate	Votes	%
Democratic	Gary Kohut	32,990	100.00%
Total votes		32,990	100.00%

== Republican primary ==
=== Candidates ===
- L. Brooks Patterson, incumbent County Executive

=== Results ===
Republican primary results
Party	Candidate	Votes	%
Republican	L. Brooks Patterson (inc.)	66,920	100.00%
Total votes		66,920	100.00%

== General election ==
=== Results ===
2000 Oakland County Executive election
Party	Candidate	Votes	%
Republican	L. Brooks Patterson (inc.)	320,589	59.33%
Democratic	Gary Kohut	203,016	37.57%
Libertarian	Paul W. Champion	16,721	3.09%
Total votes		540,326	100.00%
Republican hold			
