= Warner Norcross & Judd =

Law firm in Michigan, United States

Warner Norcross + Judd LLP
- Headquarters: Grand Rapids, Michigan
- No. of offices: 9
- Offices: Grand Rapids, Michigan, Detroit, Bloomfield Hills, Midland, Macomb, Muskegon, Kalamazoo, Holland and Lansing
- No. of attorneys: 234 (2019)
- Major practice areas: Litigation, corporate law, labor and employment law, employee benefits law, environmental law, financial services, real estate and construction, health care, trusts and estates
- Key people: Mark Wassink, Managing Partner
- Date founded: 1931
- Founder: David A Warner, George S. Norcross and Siegel W. Judd
- Company type: Professional services, Limited liability partnership
- Website: www.WNJ.com

Warner Norcross + Judd LLP is a corporate law firm with over 230 attorneys serving clients in nine offices throughout Michigan. Among the largest law firms in Michigan, Warner works in virtually all areas of business law.

== History ==
Warner traces its roots to May 1, 1931, when three attorneys from West Michigan joined forces to launch the law firm in Grand Rapids. David A. Warner, George S. Norcross and Siegel W. Judd brought varied business and legal experience to Warner Norcross + Judd, which handled a broad range of corporate work, including securities, reorganizations, real estate transactions and bankruptcies.

== Notable attorneys and alumni ==
- U.S. Congressman Hal Sawyer
- U.S. Congressman Guy Vander Jagt
- Honorable Robert J. Jonker, U.S. District Court for the Western District of Michigan
- Wolverine World Wide CEO Blake Krueger
- Bill Schuette, former U.S. Congressman and Michigan Court of Appeals judge, former Michigan Attorney General
- John H. Logie, former Grand Rapids Mayor
- John J. Bursch, former Michigan Solicitor General

== Significant litigation and transactions ==
- Windsor-Detroit Bridge Authority, $4.4 billion public-private partnership (P3)
