= 2012 Oakland County Executive election =

- November 6, 2012

Nominee	L. Brooks Patterson	Kevin Howley
Party	Republican	Democratic
Popular vote	352,293	267,069
Percentage	56.71%	42.99%
Oakland County Executive before election
L. Brooks Patterson
Republican
Elected Oakland County Executive
L. Brooks Patterson
Republican

The 2012 Oakland County Executive election was held on November 6, 2012. Incumbent County Executive L. Brooks Patterson ran for re-election to a sixth term. He was challenged by businessman Kevin Howley, the Democratic nominee. Patterson defeated Howley by a wide margin, winning 57 percent of the vote.

== Democratic primary ==
=== Candidates ===
- Kevin Howley, Huntington Woods venture capitalist

=== Results ===
Democratic primary results
Party	Candidate	Votes	%
Democratic	Kevin Howley	75,765	100.00%
Total votes		75,765	100.00%

== Republican primary ==
=== Candidates ===
- L. Brooks Patterson, incumbent County Executive
- E. Wadsworth Sherrod III, West Bloomfield resident

=== Results ===
Republican primary results
Party	Candidate	Votes	%
Republican	L. Brooks Patterson (inc.)	105,884	90.23%
Republican	E. Wadsworth Sherrod III	11,325	9.65%
Republican	Write-ins	146	0.12%
Total votes		117,355	100.00%

== General election ==
=== Results ===
2012 Oakland County Executive election
Party	Candidate	Votes	%
Republican	L. Brooks Patterson (inc.)	352,293	56.71%
Democratic	Kevin Howley	267,069	42.99%
Write-in		1,825	0.29%
Total votes		621,187	100.00%
Republican hold			
