= 2008 Oakland County Executive election =

- November 4, 2008

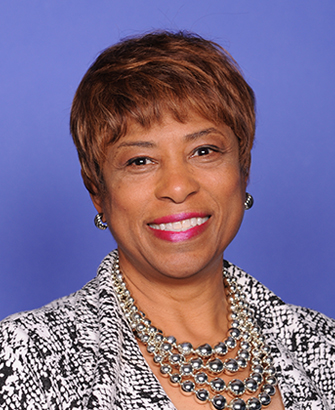
Nominee	L. Brooks Patterson	Brenda Lawrence
Party	Republican	Democratic
Popular vote	365,286	261,704
Percentage	58.08%	41.61%
Oakland County Executive before election
L. Brooks Patterson
Republican
Elected Oakland County Executive
L. Brooks Patterson
Republican

The 2008 Oakland County Executive election was held on November 4, 2008. Incumbent County Executive L. Brooks Patterson ran for re-election. He was challenged by Southfield Mayor Brenda Lawrence, the Democratic nominee. Despite Democratic presidential nominee Barack Obama's landslide victory in Oakland County in the presidential election, Patterson won re-election in a landslide, defeating Lawrence with 58 percent of the vote.

== Democratic primary ==
=== Candidates ===
- Brenda Lawrence, Mayor of Southfield

=== Results ===
Democratic primary results
Party	Candidate	Votes	%
Democratic	Brenda Lawrence	67,308	100.00%
Total votes		67,308	100.00%

== Republican primary ==
=== Candidates ===
- L. Brooks Patterson, incumbent County Executive

=== Results ===
Republican primary results
Party	Candidate	Votes	%
Republican	L. Brooks Patterson (inc.)	87,775	100.00%
Total votes		87,775	100.00%

== General election ==
=== Results ===
2008 Oakland County Executive election
Party	Candidate	Votes	%
Republican	L. Brooks Patterson (inc.)	365,286	58.08%
Democratic	Brenda Lawrence	261,704	41.61%
Write-in		1,895	0.30%
Total votes		628,885	100.00%
Republican hold			
