= Robert Hardy Cleland =

American judge (born 1947)

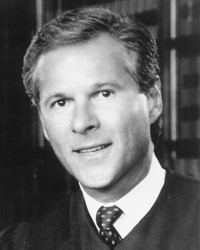

Senior Judge of the United States District Court for the Eastern District of Michigan
- Incumbent
- Assumed office February 28, 2013

Judge of the United States District Court for the Eastern District of Michigan
- In office June 19, 1990 – February 28, 2013
- Appointed by: George H. W. Bush
- Preceded by: James Paul Churchill
- Succeeded by: Linda Vivienne Parker

Personal details
- Born: April 26, 1947 (age 79) St. Clair, Michigan, U.S.
- Education: Michigan State University (BA); University of North Carolina School of Law (JD)

Robert Hardy Cleland (born April 26, 1947) is a senior United States district judge of the United States District Court for the Eastern District of Michigan.

== Education and career ==
Cleland was born in St. Clair, Michigan. He received a Bachelor of Arts degree from Michigan State University in 1969 and a Juris Doctor from the University of North Carolina School of Law in 1972. He was in private practice in Port Huron, Michigan from 1972 to 1975. He was a county assistant prosecuting attorney of Port Huron from 1972 to 1980, serving as chief assistant from 1977 to 1980. He was elected prosecuting attorney of St. Clair County, Michigan in 1980, and was re-elected twice, serving in that position from 1981 to 1990.

=== Federal judicial service ===
On February 20, 1990, Cleland was nominated by President George H. W. Bush to a seat on the United States District Court for the Eastern District of Michigan vacated by Judge James Paul Churchill. Cleland was confirmed by the United States Senate on June 18, 1990, and received his commission on June 19, 1990. He assumed senior status on February 28, 2013.

== Sources ==
Party political offices
| Preceded by L. Brooks Patterson | Republican nominee for Michigan Attorney General; 1986 | Succeeded by Clifford Taylor |
Legal offices
| Preceded by James Paul Churchill | Judge of the United States District Court for the Eastern District of Michigan; 1990–2013 | Succeeded by Linda Vivienne Parker |
