= 1982 Michigan Attorney General election =

- November 2, 1982
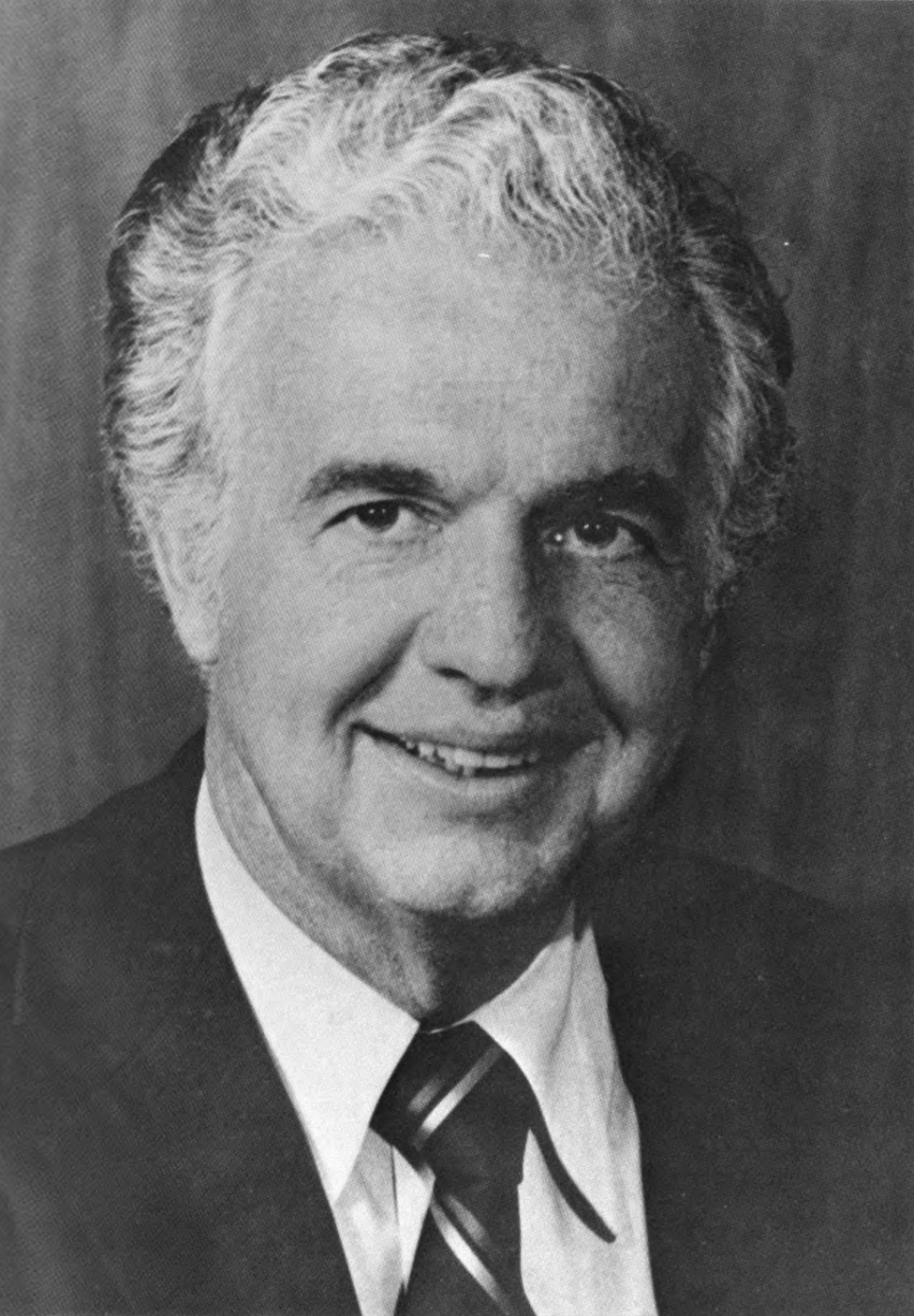

Nominee	Frank J. Kelley	L. Brooks Patterson
Party	Democratic	Republican
Popular vote	1,707,064	1,238,755
Percentage	57.52%	41.74%
- County results Kelley: 40–50% 50–60% 60–70% 70–80% Patterson: 50–60% 60–70%
Attorney General before election
Frank J. Kelley
Democratic
Elected Attorney General
Frank J. Kelley
Democratic

The 1982 Michigan Attorney General election was held on November 2, 1982. Incumbent Democrat Frank J. Kelley defeated Republican nominee and future Oakland County executive L. Brooks Patterson with 57.52% of the vote.

== General election ==
=== Candidates ===
Major party candidates

- Frank J. Kelley, Democratic
- L. Brooks Patterson, Republican
- Robert W. Roddis, Libertarian

=== Results ===
Michigan Attorney General election, 1982
Party	Candidate	Votes	%
Democratic	Frank J. Kelley (incumbent)	1,707,064	57.52
Republican	L. Brooks Patterson	1,238,755	41.74
Libertarian	Robert W. Roddis	21,728	0.73
Write-ins		18	0.00
Total votes		2,907,565	100
Democratic hold			
