= Linda Vivienne Parker =

American judge (born 1958)

Linda Parker
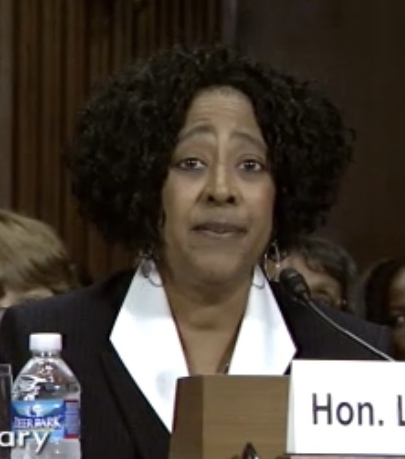
- Parker in 2013

Judge of the United States District Court for the Eastern District of Michigan
- Incumbent
- Assumed office March 17, 2014
- Appointed by: Barack Obama
- Preceded by: Robert Hardy Cleland

Personal details
- Born: 1958 (age 67–68) Detroit, Michigan, U.S.
- Education: University of Michigan (BA); George Washington University (JD)

Linda Vivienne Parker (born 1958) is a United States district judge of the United States District Court for the Eastern District of Michigan.

== Biography ==
Parker received a Bachelor of Arts degree in 1980 from the University of Michigan. She received a Juris Doctor in 1983 from George Washington University Law School. From 1983 to 1985, she served as a law clerk to the District of Columbia Superior Court. She worked as a staff attorney at the United States Environmental Protection Agency from 1985 to 1989. From 1989 to 1994, she worked at the Detroit law firm of Dickinson Wright, becoming a partner in 1992. From 1994 to 2000, she served as an executive assistant United States attorney in the Eastern District of Michigan. She served as director of the Michigan Department of Civil Rights from 2003 to 2008. From 2009 to 2014, she served as a judge of the Third Judicial Circuit Court of Michigan.

=== Federal judicial service ===
On July 25, 2013, President Barack Obama nominated Parker to serve as a United States District Judge of the United States District Court for the Eastern District of Michigan, to the seat vacated by Judge Robert Hardy Cleland, who assumed senior status on March 1, 2013. On January 16, 2014, her nomination was reported out of committee by a 14–3 vote. On March 11, 2014, the United States Senate invoked cloture on her nomination by a 56–42 vote. On March 12, 2014, her nomination was confirmed by a 60–37 vote. She received her judicial commission on March 17, 2014. Her primary chambers are in Detroit.

==== Notable rulings ====
In December 2020, Parker heard a lawsuit brought by attorneys for then-president Donald Trump, attempting to reverse the Michigan results for the 2020 U.S. presidential election, one of the so-called "Kraken" suits. She dismissed the suit, saying it was full of "theories, conjecture and speculation" and adding that "the people of Michigan have spoken."

In July 2021, Parker ordered all the attorneys who had argued Trump's case to appear before her, as she considered motions filed to impose sanctions on the attorneys for arguing that Trump had won the election and presenting evidence that she said they had not evaluated for accuracy. On August 25, 2021, Parker ruled that "Plaintiffs' counsel filed this lawsuit in bad faith and for an improper purpose", demanding that the attorneys, including Sidney Powell and Lin Wood, pay the legal fees of some of the defendants in the suit, and that they be referred to their respective state bars for disciplinary action.

== See also ==
- List of African-American federal judges
- List of African-American jurists

Legal offices
Preceded by Robert Hardy Cleland	Judge of the United States District Court for the Eastern District of Michigan; 2014–present	Incumbent
