= 1986 Michigan Attorney General election =

- November 4, 1986
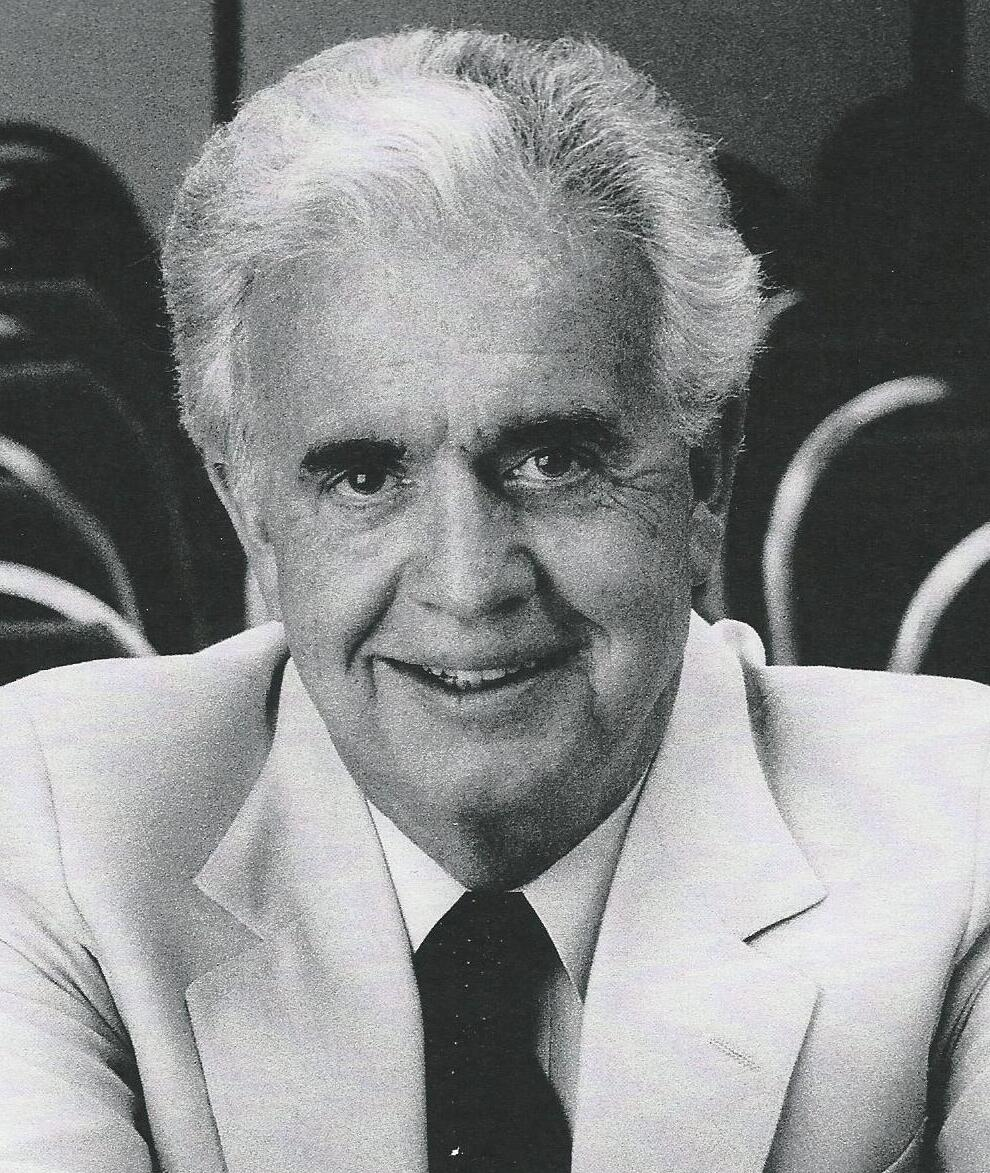

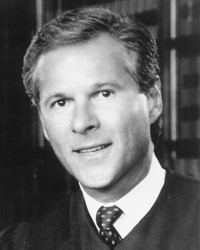
Nominee	Frank J. Kelley	Robert H. Cleland
Party	Democratic	Republican
Popular vote	1,585,999	707,835
Percentage	68.64%	30.63%
Attorney General before election
Frank J. Kelley
Democratic
Elected Attorney General
Frank J. Kelley
Democratic

The 1986 Michigan Attorney General election was held on November 4, 1986. Incumbent Democrat Frank J. Kelley defeated Republican nominee Robert H. Cleland with 68.64% of the vote.

== General election ==
=== Candidates ===
Major party candidates

- Frank J. Kelley, Democratic
- Robert H. Cleland, Republican
- Max Dean, Independent

=== Results ===
Michigan Attorney General election, 1986
Party	Candidate	Votes	%
Democratic	Frank J. Kelley (incumbent)	1,585,999	68.64
Republican	Robert H. Cleland	707,835	30.63
Independent	Max Dean	16,932	0.73
Write-ins		20	0.00
Total votes		2,310,786	100
Democratic hold			
