= Fadwa Hammoud =

American lawyer

Solicitor General of Michigan
- In office January 15, 2019 – 2023
- Attorney General: Dana Nessel
- Preceded by: Aaron Lindstrom
- Succeeded by: Ann Sherman

Personal details
- Born: Fadwa Alawieh
- Education: University of Michigan–Dearborn (BA); Wayne State University Law School (JD)

Fadwa Alawieh Hammoud is a Lebanese-born American attorney and former government official. She is a former chief deputy Attorney General of Michigan, and previously served as solicitor general of Michigan. Hammoud had been elected as a member of the Dearborn Board of Education in 2016.

As state solicitor general, she was responsible for overseeing the investigation into the Flint water crisis. Hammoud's appointment made her the first Muslim and first Arab-American state solicitor general in the United States.

== Early life and education ==
At age 11, Hammoud emigrated to the United States from Lebanon. Hammoud graduated from Fordson High School. Hammoud earned a B.A. in political science and communications from the University of Michigan–Dearborn and a J.D. from Wayne State University Law School. In 2018, Hammoud was a member of the Harvard Business School's Young American Leaders Program.

== Career ==
Hammoud has clerked for United States District Court Judge George Steeh. Hammoud has also served as assistant prosecuting attorney for Wayne County, Michigan and as leading prosecutting attorney for Wayne County. On November 8, 2016, Hammoud was elected as a member of Dearborn Board of Education.

In January 2019, Hammoud was appointed by Michigan Attorney General Dana Nessel as Solicitor General of Michigan. On February 18, 2019, Hammoud took the oath of office and was sworn in. Hammoud is the first Arab-American solicitor general in the United States. In March 2019, Hammoud resigned from both the Dearborn Board of Education and as a trustee as Henry Ford College.

As solicitor general, Hammoud was put in charge of the Flint water crisis investigations. On April 16, 2019, Hammoud fired Todd Flood, a special prosecutor appointed by the previous administration's attorney general, claiming he failed to "fully and properly" pursue potentially important evidence in the water crisis criminal cases. Hammoud served as a Trustee and Treasurer of the Dearborn Public Schools Board of Education and the Henry Ford College Board.

Former Michigan Governor Rick Snyder appointed Hammoud to the Commission on Middle Eastern American Affairs. She also served on the Legislative Committee for the Hispanic/Latino, Asian Pacific American and Middle Eastern American Affairs Commissions. In 2018, Hammoud was a member of the Harvard Business School's Young American Leaders Program.

On December 7, 2022, Michigan Attorney General Dana Nessel announced the appointment of Hammoud as Chief Deputy Attorney General. She left the position in 2024 to become managing director of law firm Miller Johnson's Detroit office.

In 2025, she endorsed Abdul El-Sayed's candidacy for the United States Senate in the 2026 election.

== Notable cases ==
In October 2021, Hammoud became the first Muslim Arab American woman to argue a case before the U.S. Supreme Court. The case in question was Brown v. Davenport.

== Personal life ==
Hammoud is Muslim. She is the first Muslim solicitor general in the United States. Hammoud grew up with one brother, and is married to prosecutor Ali Hammoud, with whom she has 2 children.
