= James Paul Churchill =

American judge (1924–2020)

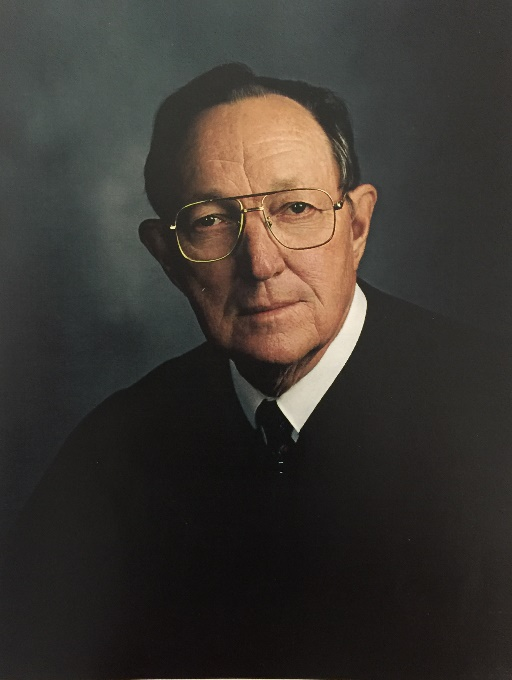

Senior Judge of the United States District Court for the Eastern District of Michigan
- In office December 31, 1989 – June 29, 2020

Chief Judge of the United States District Court for the Eastern District of Michigan
- In office 1989–1989
- Preceded by: Philip Pratt
- Succeeded by: Julian Abele Cook Jr.

Judge of the United States District Court for the Eastern District of Michigan
- In office December 20, 1974 – December 31, 1989
- Appointed by: Gerald Ford
- Preceded by: Stephen John Roth
- Succeeded by: Robert Hardy Cleland

Personal details
- Born: April 10, 1924 Imlay City, Michigan
- Died: June 29, 2020 (aged 96) Harbor Springs, Michigan
- Education: University of Michigan (B.B.A.); University of Michigan Law School (LL.B.)

James Paul Churchill (April 10, 1924 – June 29, 2020) was a United States district judge of the United States District Court for the Eastern District of Michigan.

== Education and career ==
Churchill was born in Imlay City, Michigan. He served in the United States Army during World War II from 1943 to 1946 in a field artillery battery of the 103rd Infantry Division. His unit was in France, Germany, and Austria. After Army service, he received a Bachelor of Business Administration from the University of Michigan in 1947 and a Bachelor of Laws from the University of Michigan Law School in 1950. He was in private practice in Vassar, Michigan from 1951 to 1965. He was a Circuit Judge of the 40th Judicial Circuit of Michigan from 1965 to 1974.

== Federal judicial service ==
On December 2, 1974, Churchill was nominated by President Gerald Ford to a seat on the United States District Court for the Eastern District of Michigan vacated by Judge Stephen John Roth. Churchill was confirmed by the United States Senate on December 18, 1974, and received his commission on December 20, 1974. He served as Chief Judge in 1989, assuming senior status on December 31, 1989. He died on June 29, 2020, aged 96.

== See also ==
- List of United States federal judges by longevity of service

== Sources ==
Legal offices
Preceded by Stephen John Roth	Judge of the United States District Court for the Eastern District of Michigan; 1974–1989	Succeeded by Robert Hardy Cleland
Preceded by Philip Pratt	Chief Judge of the United States District Court for the Eastern District of Michigan; 1989	Succeeded by Julian Abele Cook Jr.
