= Robert P. Griffin =

American politician

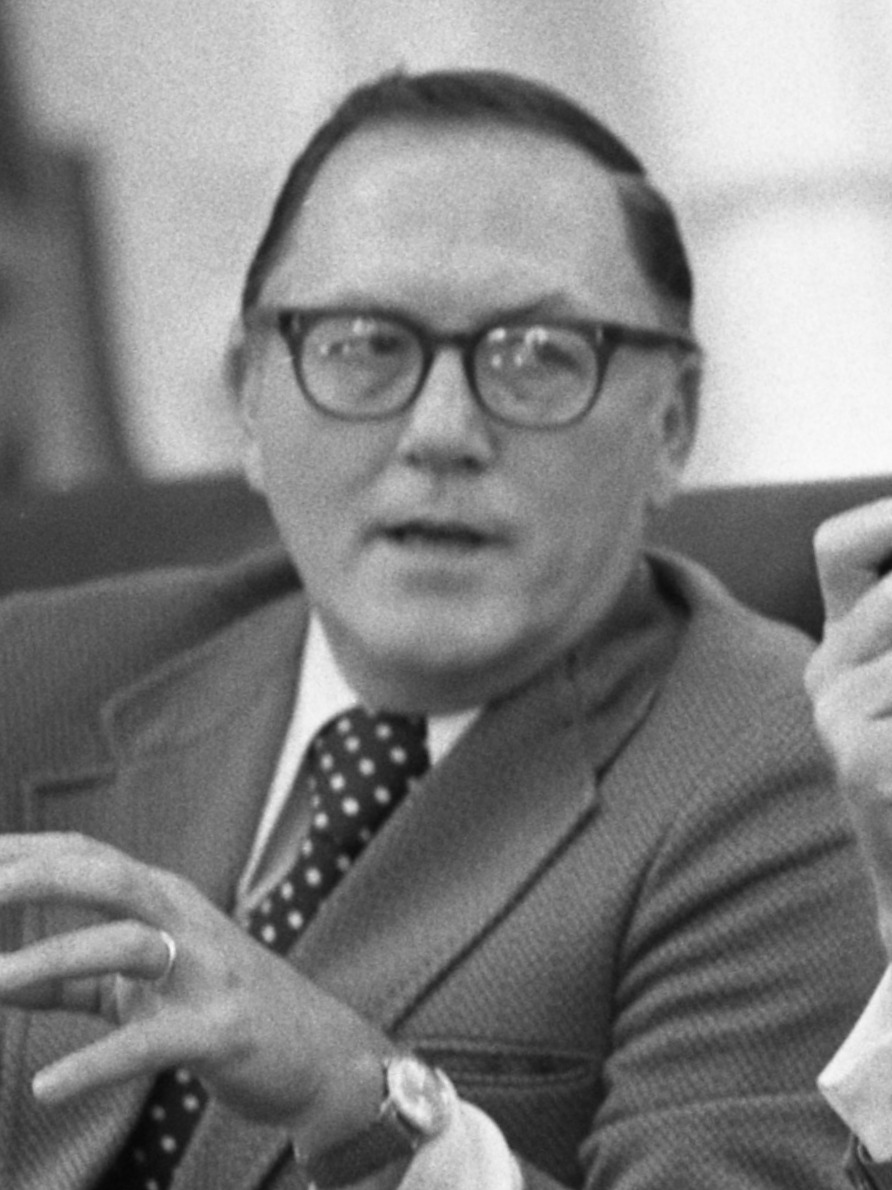
- Griffin c. mid 1970s

Senate Minority Whip
- In office September 24, 1969 – January 3, 1977
- Leader: Hugh Scott
- Preceded by: Hugh Scott
- Succeeded by: Ted Stevens

United States Senator from Michigan
- In office May 11, 1966 – January 3, 1979
- Preceded by: Patrick McNamara
- Succeeded by: Carl Levin

Member of the U.S. House of Representatives from Michigan's 9th district
- In office January 3, 1957 – May 10, 1966
- Preceded by: Ruth Thompson
- Succeeded by: Guy Vander Jagt

Justice of the Michigan Supreme Court
- In office January 1, 1987 – January 1, 1995
- Preceded by: G. Mennen Williams
- Succeeded by: Elizabeth Weaver

Personal details
- Born: Robert Paul Griffin; November 6, 1923 Detroit, Michigan, U.S.
- Died: April 16, 2015 (aged 91) Traverse City, Michigan, U.S.
- Party: Republican
- Spouse: Marjorie Anderson (m. 1947)
- Children: 4, including Richard
- Education: Central Michigan University (BA); University of Michigan (JD)

Military service
- Allegiance: United States
- Branch/service: United States Army
- Years of service: 1943–1946
- Unit: 71st Infantry Division
- Battles/wars: World War II

Robert Paul Griffin (November 6, 1923 – April 16, 2015) was an American politician from the U.S. state of Michigan. A member of the Republican Party, he served in both chambers of the United States Congress as a Representative from 1957 to 1966 and as a U.S. Senator from 1966 to 1979. He later served a Justice of the Michigan Supreme Court from 1987 to 1995. He co-sponsored the Labor Management Reporting and Disclosure Act of 1959, which regulates the internal affairs of labor unions. As a deputy minority leader in the Senate, he called on President Richard Nixon, a fellow Republican, to resign during the Watergate scandal.

== Early life ==
Griffin was born in Detroit, Michigan, and attended public schools in Garden City and Dearborn. During the Second World War, he enlisted in the 71st Infantry Division in 1943 and spent fourteen months in Europe. After the war, he graduated from Central Michigan University (known in former times as Central Michigan College) in Mount Pleasant, Michigan in 1947. He received a Juris Doctor degree from the University of Michigan Law School and was admitted to the bar in 1950. He commenced the practice of law in Traverse City, Michigan.

== Career ==
Griffin was elected to the U.S. House of Representatives from Michigan's 9th congressional district in 1956, unseating incumbent Ruth Thompson in the Republican primary. Griffin served in the House during the 85th United States Congress as well as the four succeeding United States Congresses, a period spanning January 3, 1957, until May 10, 1966. After the revelations of the United States Senate Select Committee on Improper Activities in Labor and Management, which investigated corruption and organized crime influence in labor unions, he and United States House of Representatives member Phillip M. Landrum from Georgia sponsored the Labor Management Reporting and Disclosure Act of 1959 also known as the Landrum-Griffin Act. He later supported Gerald Ford as the Republican Conference Chairman and later, the House Minority Leader. During his tenure in the House, Griffin voted in favor of the Civil Rights Acts of 1960 and 1964, as well as the Twenty-fourth Amendment to the United States Constitution and the Voting Rights Act of 1965, but did not vote on the Civil Rights Act of 1957.

He resigned May 10, 1966, to take a seat in the United States Senate. Following the death of United States Senate member Patrick V. McNamara, governor of Michigan George W. Romney appointed him to finish McNamara's term. In the 1966 election, he won election to a full term, defeating former Governor G. Mennen Williams by a 56% to 44% margin. He defeated Attorney General Frank J. Kelley in the 1972 election for a second term.

In 1968, Griffin led a successful filibuster against the nomination of Associate Justice Associate Justice of the Supreme Court of the United States Abe Fortas to be elevated to the position of Chief Justice, charging President (and former Senate Majority Leader) Lyndon B. Johnson with cronyism, noting the close relationship between the two. Fortas resigned his Associate Justice seat in May 1969 when it was discovered Fortas had been paid a $20,000 a year retainer by Louis Wolfson, a close friend and former client, since 1966. Griffin voted in favor of both the Civil Rights Act of 1968 and the confirmation of Thurgood Marshall to the Supreme Court of the United States. He became the Republican Whip in the Senate on September 24, 1969, and served until 1977.

In 1974, he wrote to President Richard Nixon to inform him that if the White House did not release tapes that the United States Senate Watergate Committee subpoenaed, the President would face impeachment and trial in the Senate. He also told the President that he considered the failure to comply with the subpoena as an impeachable offense. Up to that point, Griffin had been a supporter of the President.

Griffin was an unsuccessful candidate for reelection in 1978, narrowly defeated by former Detroit City Council president Carl Levin. He initially announced in April 1977 that he would not run for re-election in 1978, saying that he was tired and that Washington needed new blood. He went on to miss a third of the votes in 1977. He changed his mind later in the campaign and Levin used his own words and his attendance record against him during the campaign.

Later, Griffin served as a justice of the Michigan Supreme Court from 1987 to 1994. His son, Richard Allen Griffin, was a judge on the Michigan Court of Appeals from 1989 to 2005, when he was appointed by President George W. Bush to the United States Court of Appeals for the Sixth Circuit.

During the elder Griffin's first Senate campaign in 1966, a suburban Detroit rock band, Doug Brown and the Omens, released a promotional flexi disc in support of Griffin's candidacy. The song, "Give Bob The Ball" (which extolled Griffin's "youth and experience") has been included on the garage rock compilation album Friday At The Hideout.

== Personal life and death ==
Griffin was a resident of Traverse City, Michigan, in Northern Michigan. He married Marjorie Anderson of Ludington in 1947. Together, they had four children, including Richard Griffin. Griffin died on April 16, 2015, aged 91. He was interred at Linwood Cemetery near Traverse City's Long Lake.

== Bibliography ==
- Griffin, Robert P. "The Landrum-Griffin Act: Twelve Years of Experience in Protecting Employee Rights." Georgia Law Review 5 (summer 1971): 622–42
- Griffin, Robert P. "Rules and Procedure of the Standing Committees." In We Propose: A Modern Congress, edited by Mary McInnis, pp. 37–53. New York: McGraw-Hill, 1966.

U.S. House of Representatives
| Preceded by Ruth Thompson | Member of the U.S. House of Representatives from Michigan's 9th congressional district January 3, 1957 – May 10, 1966 | Succeeded by Guy Vander Jagt |
U.S. Senate
| Preceded by Patrick McNamara | U.S. Senator (Class 2) from Michigan; May 11, 1966 – January 3, 1979; Served alongside: Philip Hart, Donald Riegle | Succeeded by Carl Levin |
| Preceded by Hugh Scott | Senate Minority Whip; September 7, 1969 – January 3, 1977 | Succeeded by Ted Stevens |
Party political offices
| Preceded by Alvin Morell Bentley | Republican nominee for U.S. Senator from Michigan (Class 2); 1966, 1966, 1972, 1978 | Succeeded by Jack R. Lousma |
| Preceded by Hugh Scott | Senate Republican Whip; September 7, 1969 – January 3, 1977 | Succeeded by Ted Stevens |
| Preceded by Everett Dirksen; Gerald Ford | Response to the State of the Union address 1968; Served alongside: Howard Baker, George H. W. Bush, Peter Dominick, Gerald Ford, Mel Laird, Bob Mathias, George Murphy, Chuck Percy, Dick Poff, Al Quie, Charlotte Reid, Hugh Scott, Bill Steiger, John Tower | Vacant Title next held by Donald Fraser, Scoop Jackson, Mike Mansfield, John McCormack, Patsy Mink, Ed Muskie, Bill Proxmire |
Legal offices
| Preceded by G. Mennen Williams | Justice of the Michigan Supreme Court; January 1, 1987 – January 1, 1995 | Succeeded by Elizabeth Weaver |
