= 1978 Michigan Attorney General election =

- November 7, 1978
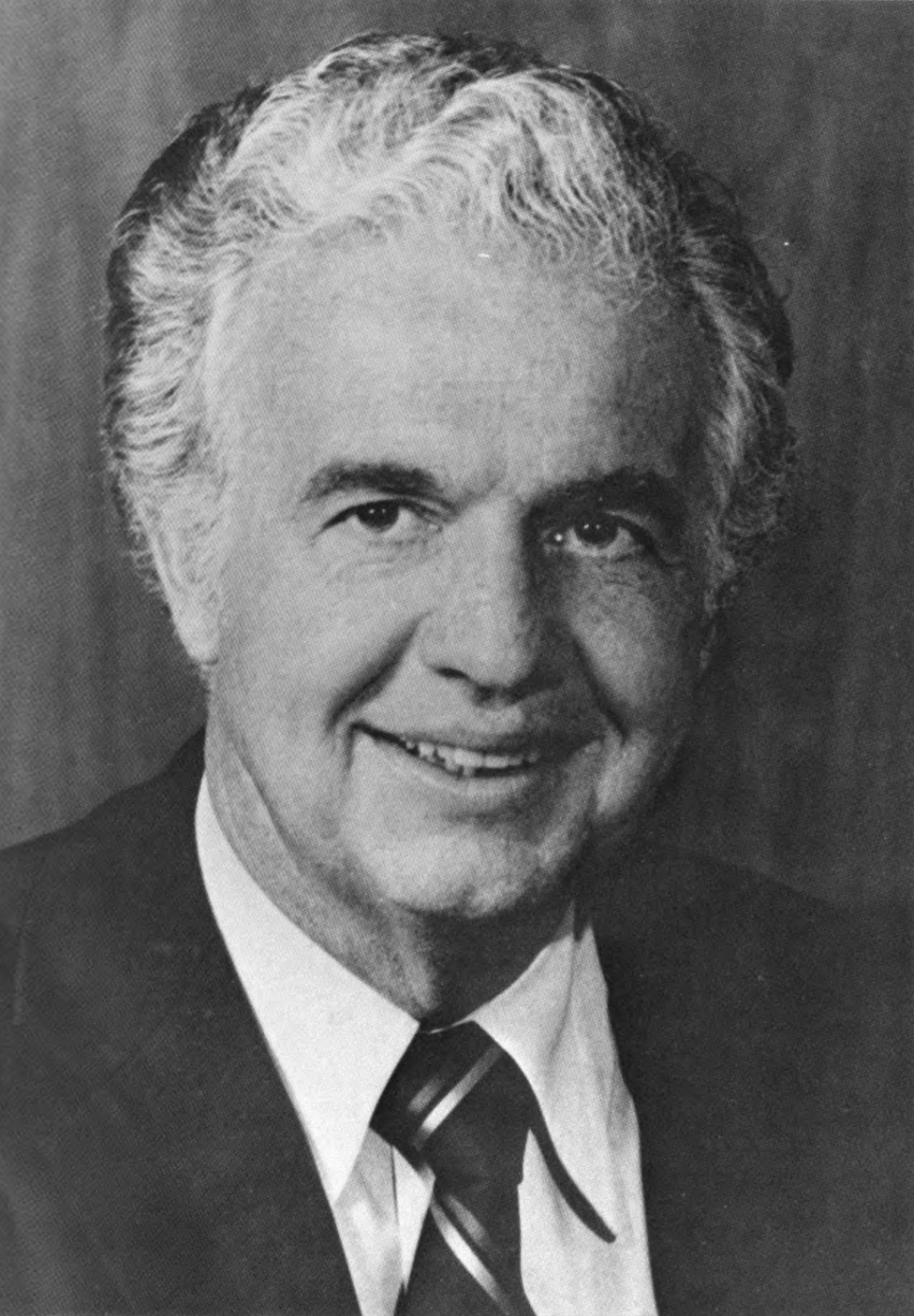

| Nominee | Frank J. Kelley | Stephen C. Bransdorfer |
| Party | Democratic | Republican |
| Popular vote | 1,853,481 | 857,897 |
| Percentage | 67.50% | 31.24% |
Attorney General before election
Frank J. Kelley
Democratic
Elected Attorney General
Frank J. Kelley
Democratic

The 1978 Michigan Attorney General election was held on November 7, 1978. Incumbent Democrat Frank J. Kelley defeated Republican nominee Stephen C. Bransdorfer with 67.50% of the vote.

Bransdorfer conceded the election early, before 10% of the return votes were counted.

== General election ==
=== Candidates ===
Major party candidates

- Frank J. Kelley, Democratic
- Stephen C. Bransdorfer, Republican

=== Results ===
Michigan Attorney General election, 1978
| Party | Candidate | Votes | % |
|---|---|---|---|
| Democratic | Frank J. Kelley (incumbent) | 1,853,481 | 67.50 |
| Republican | Stephen C. Bransdorfer | 857,897 | 31.24 |
| American Independent | James E. Wells | 34,523 | 1.26 |
| Write-ins | | 46 | 0.00 |
| Total votes | | 2,745,947 | 100 |
| Democratic hold | | | |
