= Foss O. Eldred =

American politician

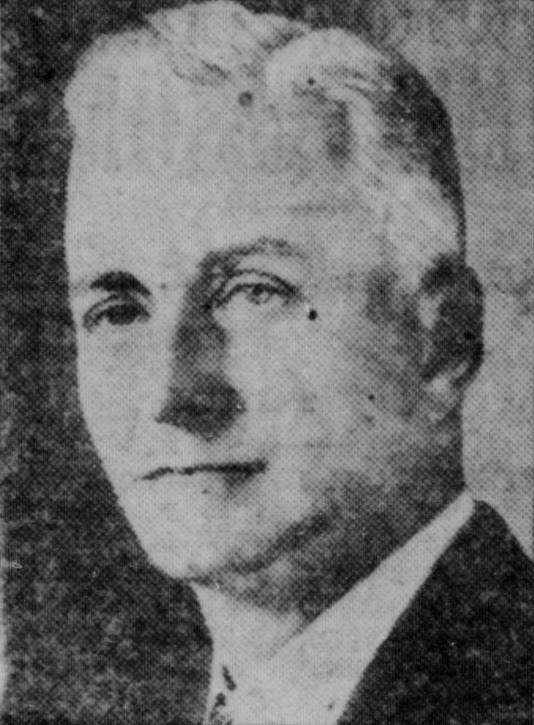
Foss O. Eldred in 1931

Foss O. Eldred (1884–1956) was an American educator and politician in Michigan. He served as Attorney General of Michigan in 1946 when he was appointed to fill out an unexpired term. He also held many other political offices.

Eldred was from Ionia, Michigan. He studied at Albion College and then Michigan State Normal College (now Eastern Michigan University), graduating with a degree in teaching from the latter. He served as superintendent of schools in Lyons, Michigan, and then was an assistant instructor of reading at Michigan State Normal College.

Eldred was a Republican. He was a member of the Michigan State Senate from the 18th District from 1921 to 1924. He then served as Prosecuting Attorney for Ionia County from 1925 to 1928. In 1931, he ran unsuccessfully for Congress in the Michigan 8th Congressional District, losing to Michael J. Hart by 5,000 votes largely because Eldred supported prohibition and Hart was a hard-core supporter of its repeal. He was elected mayor of Ionia in 1935 and served as a delegate to the Republican National Convention in 1940.

Eldred married Erminie Mary; they had one son, Ney Eldred, who as of 1951 was Ionia County Prosecutor.

== Sources ==
- The Political Graveyard
- Aurora, 1908

Legal offices
Preceded by John R. Dethmers	Michigan Attorney General; 1946	Succeeded by Eugene F. Black
