= 1966 United States Senate elections in Michigan =

1966 United States Senate election in Michigan
- November 8, 1966
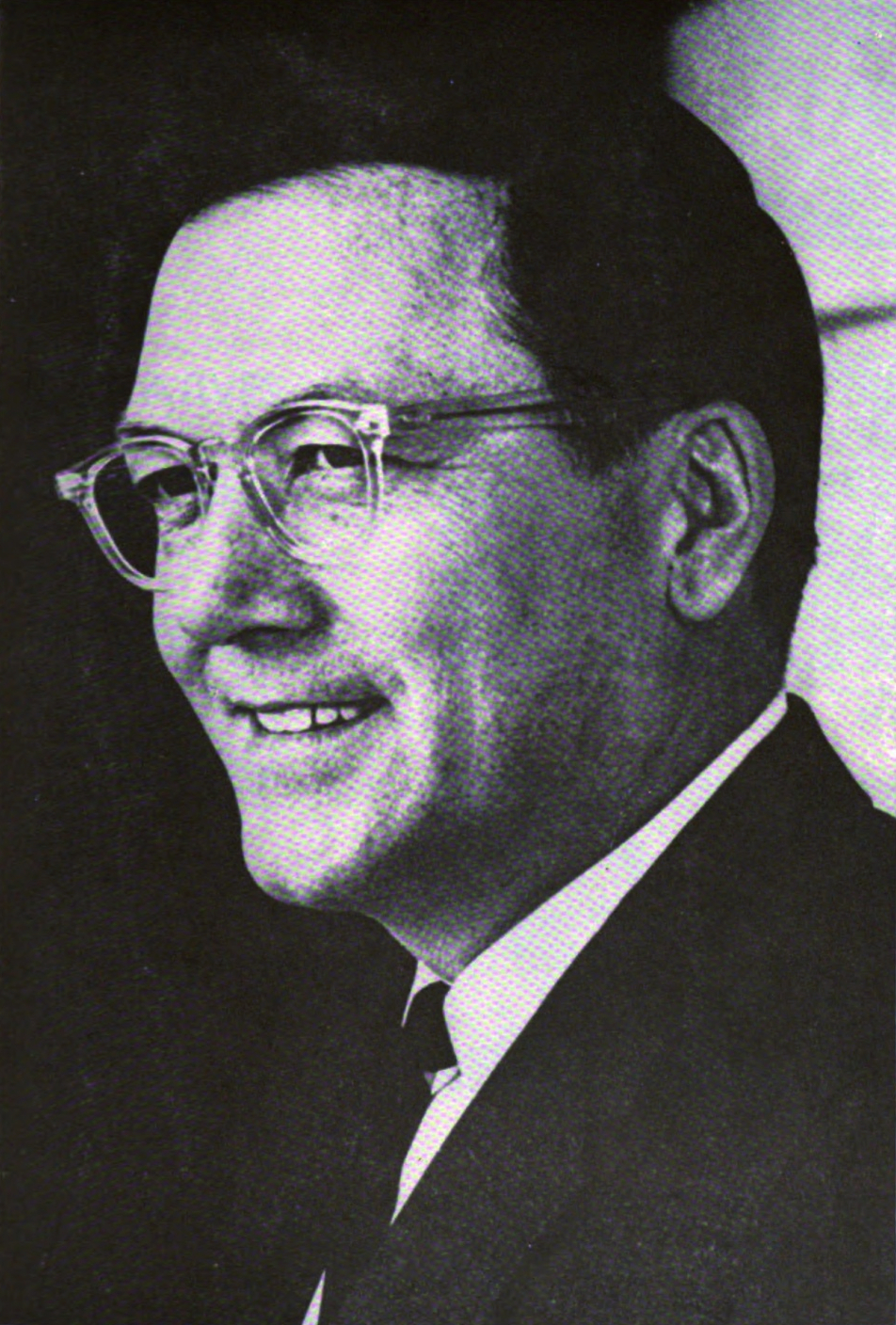

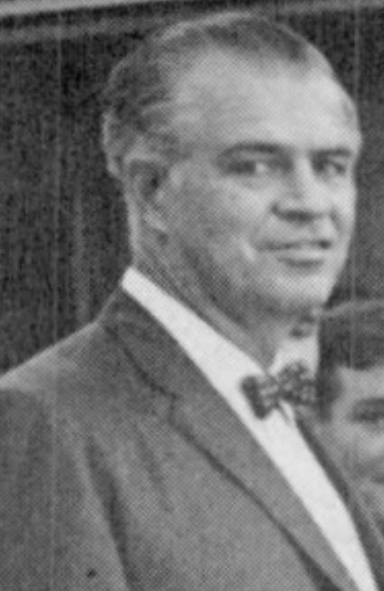
Nominee	Robert P. Griffin	G. Mennen Williams
Party	Republican	Democratic
Popular vote	1,363,530	1,069,484
Percentage	55.90%	43.85%
- County results Griffin: 50–60% 60–70% 70–80% Williams: 40–50% 50–60%
U.S. senator before election
Robert P. Griffin
Republican
Elected U.S. Senator
Robert P. Griffin
Republican

The 1966 United States Senate elections in Michigan were held on November 7, 1966. Incumbent Republican U.S. Senator Robert P. Griffin, who had been appointed to the seat in May to fill the vacancy left by the death of Patrick V. McNamara, was re-elected to a full term in office. Griffin defeated Democratic former Governor G. Mennen Williams in the regularly scheduled election, as well as the concurrent special election to complete McNamara's unfinished term.

== Democratic primary ==
=== Candidates ===
- Jerome P. Cavanagh, Mayor of Detroit
- G. Mennen Williams, Assistant U.S. Secretary of State for Africa Affairs and former Governor of Michigan (1949–1961)

=== Results ===
Primary results by county Williams: Williams—80–90%; Williams—70–80%; Williams—60–70%; Williams—50–60%; Cavanagh: Cavanagh—50–60%

1966 U.S. Senate Democratic primary in Michigan (full term)
Party	Candidate	Votes	%
Democratic	G. Mennen Williams	437,438	60.10%
Democratic	Jerome P. Cavanagh	290,465	39.90%
Write-in		2	0.00%
Total votes		727,905	100.00%

1966 U.S. Senate Democratic primary in Michigan (partial term)
Party	Candidate	Votes	%
Democratic	G. Mennen Williams	381,496	59.57%
Democratic	Jerome P. Cavanagh	258,822	40.42%
Write-in		6	0.00%
Total votes		640,324	100.00%

== Republican primary ==
1966 U.S. Senate Republican primary in Michigan (full term)
Party	Candidate	Votes	%
Republican	Robert P. Griffin	387,892	99.99%
Write-in		31	0.00%
Total votes		387,923	100.00%

1966 U.S. Senate Republican primary in Michigan (partial term)
Party	Candidate	Votes	%
Republican	Robert P. Griffin	356,700	99.99%
Write-in		32	0.00%
Total votes		356,732	100.00%

== General election ==
=== Results ===
==== Regular ====
1966 U.S. Senate election in Michigan
Party	Candidate	Votes	%
Republican	Robert P. Griffin (incumbent)	1,363,530	55.89%
Democratic	G. Mennen Williams	1,069,484	43.84%
Socialist Labor	Ralph W. Muncy	6,166	0.25%
Write-in		185	0.00%
Total votes		2,439,365	100.00%

==== Special ====
1966 U.S. Senate special election in Michigan
Party	Candidate	Votes	%
Republican	Robert P. Griffin (incumbent)	1,321,222	56.00%
Democratic	G. Mennen Williams	1,031,138	43.70%
Socialist Labor	Ralph W. Muncy	6,444	0.27%
Write-in		296	0.01%
Total votes		2,359,100	100.00%

== See also ==
- 1966 United States Senate elections
