= Paul L. Adams (Michigan judge) =

American judge

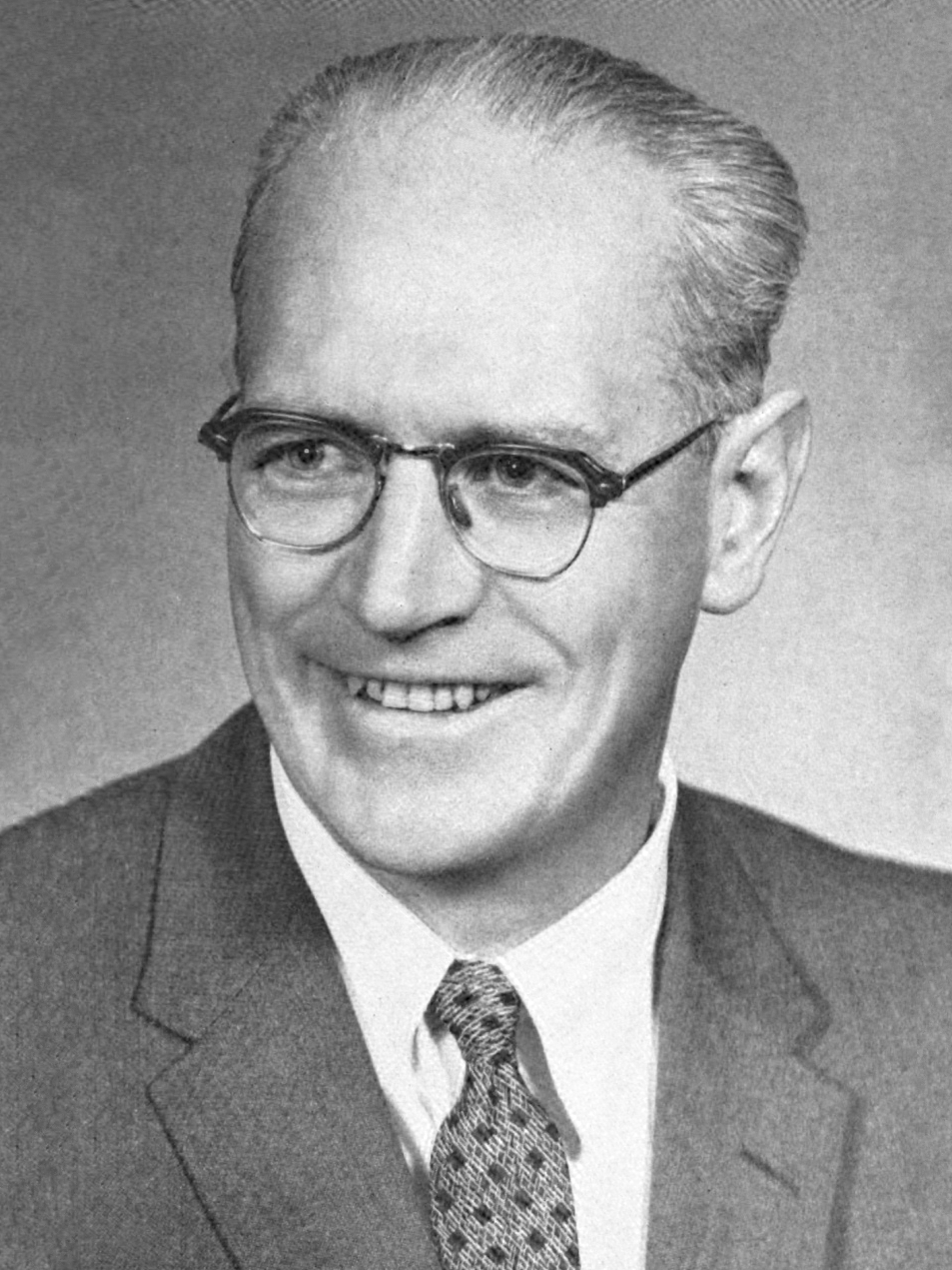

79th Justice of the Michigan Supreme Court
- In office 1964–1973
- Preceded by: Leland W. Carr
- Succeeded by: Levin/Coleman
- In office December 1961 – December 31, 1962
- Appointed by: John Swainson
- Preceded by: George Edwards, Jr.
- Succeeded by: Michael O'Hara

49th Michigan Attorney General
- In office January 1, 1958 – December 27, 1961
- Governor: G. Mennen Williams; John Swainson
- Preceded by: Thomas M. Kavanagh
- Succeeded by: Frank J. Kelley

200th Regent of the University of Michigan
- In office January 1, 1956 – 1957
- Succeeded by: Donald N. D. Thurber

Mayor of Sault Ste. Marie
- In office 1938–1942
- Preceded by: George J. Laundy

Personal details
- Born: Paul Lincoln Adams; April 9, 1908 Sault Ste. Marie, Michigan, U.S.
- Died: November 23, 1990 (aged 82) Lansing, Michigan, U.S.
- Spouse: Ruth Karpinski (m. 1934)
- Education: University of Michigan (BA, MA); University of Michigan Law School (LLB)

Paul Lincoln Adams (April 9, 1908 – November 23, 1990) was an American lawyer, politician, and judge from Michigan. He served as a mayor of Sault Ste. Marie, as a member of the University of Michigan Board of Regents, as Michigan Attorney General, and as a justice of the Michigan Supreme Court.

== Early life and education ==
Adams was born in Sault Ste. Marie, Michigan, on April 9, 1908. His family had been farmers in the area since 1897, but by the early 1900s had shifted to insurance and real estate. Adams graduated Sault High School in 1926. He received his B.A. in 1930 and M.A. in 1931 from the University of Michigan.

Adams returned to his family business for three years, then entered the University of Michigan Law School. He earned his LL.B. in 1936 and was admitted to the bar the same year. While in law school, he became friends with G. Mennen Williams and others who became prominent in Michigan politics. Also while in law school, Adams married Ruth Karpinski, daughter of the University of Michigan mathematician Louis Charles Karpinski.

== Career ==
Adams returned to Sault Ste. Marie, where he practiced law and served in various civic roles. He was mayor from 1938 to 1942. From 1941 to 1943, during World War II, he served as director of civil defense in Sault Ste. Marie. From 1943 to 1944, Adams served with the Board of Economic Warfare in Washington, D.C.; he then returned to Sault Ste. Marie. In 1949, Adams served as a member of the Michigan Social Welfare Commission. In 1950, he served as chair of the Sault Ste. Marie Charter Commission.

In 1956, Adams was elected a member of the University of Michigan Board of Regents. He served until the following year, when Governor G. Mennen Williams appointed to fill an unexpired term as Michigan Attorney General. Adams was elected twice as attorney general in his own right (in 1958 and 1960). He left the position after Governor John Swainson appointed Adams in December 1961 to serve on the Michigan Supreme Court. Adams left the court later that year but returned in 1964 and served on the court until his retirement in 1973. Thereafter, he spent his time in Clinton County, Michigan, where he had orchards. Adams died on November 23, 1990. He was survived by his wife Ruth and four daughters.

Adams' papers are archived at the Bentley Historical Library at the University of Michigan.

== Notes ==
Party political offices
Preceded by Thomas M. Kavanagh	Democratic nominee for Michigan Attorney General; 1958, 1960	Succeeded by Frank J. Kelley
Legal offices
Preceded by Thomas M. Kavanagh	Michigan Attorney General; 1957-1961	Succeeded by Frank J. Kelley
