= Thomas M. Kavanagh =

American jurist (1909–1975)

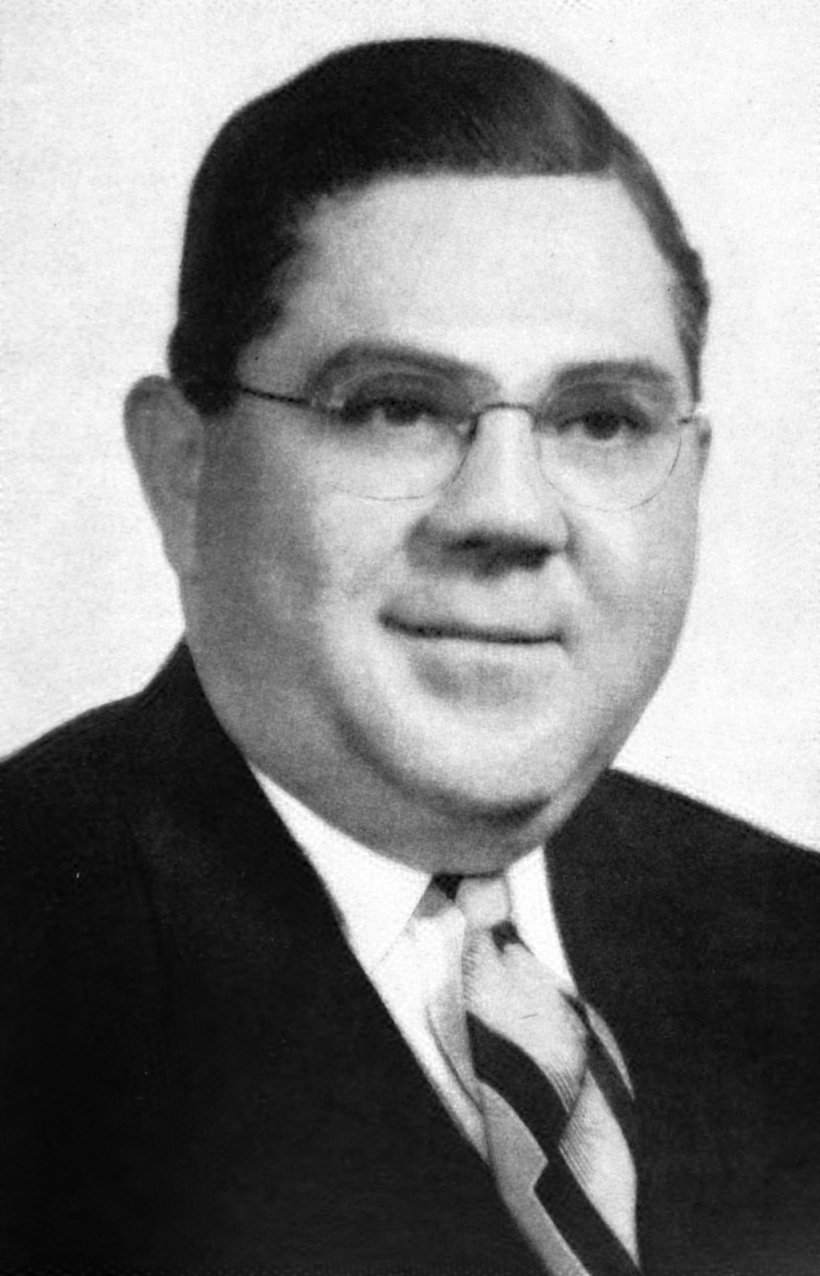

52nd and 55th Chief Justice of the Michigan Supreme Court
- In office 1971 – April 19, 1975
- Preceded by: Thomas E. Brennan
- Succeeded by: Thomas G. Kavanagh
- In office 1964–1966
- Preceded by: Leland W. Carr
- Succeeded by: John Dethmers

76th Justice of the Michigan Supreme Court
- In office 1958 – April 19, 1975
- Preceded by: Edward Sharpe
- Succeeded by: Lawrence Lindemer

48th Michigan Attorney General
- In office January 1, 1955 – December 4, 1957
- Governor: G. Mennen Williams
- Preceded by: Frank G. Millard
- Succeeded by: Paul L. Adams

Personal details
- Born: August 4, 1909 Carson City, Michigan
- Died: April 19, 1975 (aged 65) Lansing, Michigan
- Spouse: Agnes Miller (m. 1930)
- Education: University of Detroit (LL.B.)

Thomas Matthew Kavanagh (August 4, 1909 – April 19, 1975) was an American jurist.

Born near Carson City, Michigan, Kavanagh received his law degree from University of Detroit Mercy. He practiced law in Detroit, Michigan and then returned to Carson City, Michigan where he continued to practice law. Kavanagh served as city attorney and city clerk for Carson City. Kavanagh was a Democrat. He served as the 48th Michigan Attorney General from 1955 to 1957, defeating the incumbent Frank G. Millard in 1954. Thomas Kavanagh went on to serve as a justice of the Michigan Supreme Court from 1958 to 1975 which included eight years as chief justice from 1964 to 1966 from 1971 until his death in 1975. Justice Kavanagh was of no relation to fellow Justice (and successor as Chief Justice) Thomas G. Kavanagh. He died of cancer in Lansing, Michigan.

== Notes ==
Party political offices
Preceded by John T. Damm	Democratic nominee for Michigan Attorney General; 1954, 1956	Succeeded by Paul L. Adams
Legal offices
Preceded by Frank G. Millard	Michigan Attorney General; 1955–1957	Succeeded by Paul L. Adams
