= John J. Bursch =

American lawyer (born 1972)

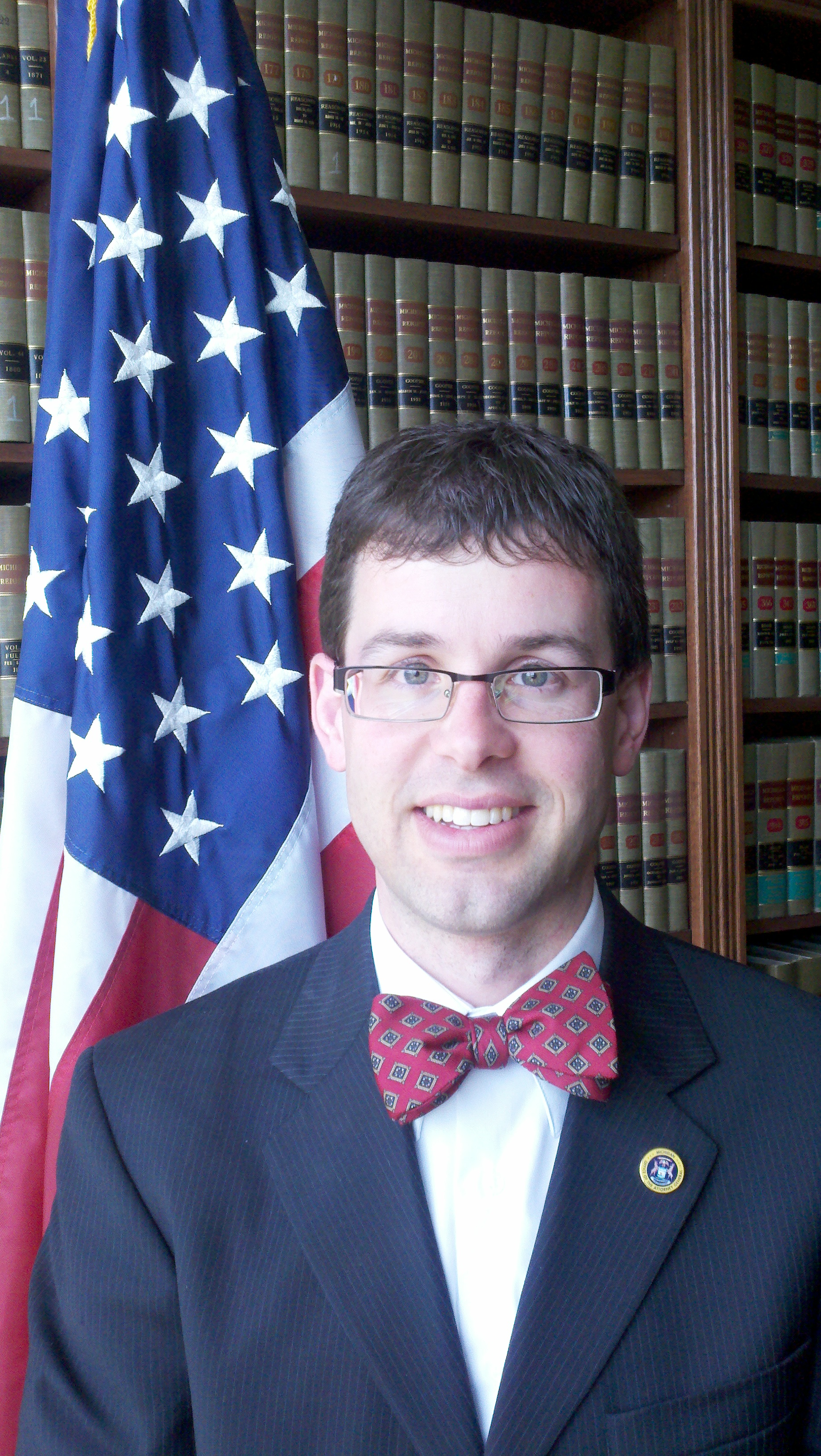
- Bursch in 2011

Solicitor General of Michigan
- In office February 28, 2011 – December 6, 2013
- Governor: Rick Snyder
- Preceded by: Eric Restuccia
- Succeeded by: Aaron Lindstrom

Personal details
- Born: 1972 (age 53–54)
- Party: Republican
- Education: Western Michigan University (BA); University of Minnesota, Twin Cities (JD)

John J. Bursch (born 1972) is an American attorney who served as the 10th Michigan Solicitor General. He was appointed by Michigan Attorney General Bill Schuette on February 28, 2011. Prior to being Michigan Solicitor General, Bursch served as chair of the Appellate Practice and Public-Affairs Litigation Groups at Warner Norcross & Judd. Bursch argued in more than 6% of all the cases the U.S. Supreme Court heard during his tenure as solicitor general. Bursch returned to private practice at Warner Norcross & Judd in December 2013, and founded his own law firm in 2016, Bursch Law.

Bursch works as senior counsel at the conservative Christian legal organization Alliance Defending Freedom and is active in the Federalist Society. He is involved in several cases related to freedom of religion, such as Kluge v. Brownsburg Community School Corporation, where a teacher sought religious accommodation to refer to students only by their last names, rather than by their preferred names or pronouns.

== Education ==
Bursch graduated from Grand Ledge High School in 1990, and attended Western Michigan University, where he received degrees in mathematics and music summa cum laude and graduated from the Lee Honors College in 1994. In 1997, Bursch received his J.D. magna cum laude from the University of Minnesota Law School.

== Legal career ==
From 1997 to 1998, Bursch served as a law clerk to James B. Loken on the United States Court of Appeals for the Eighth Circuit. Bursch then entered private practice with Warner Norcross & Judd, where he founded and chaired the firm's Appellate Practice and Public-Affairs Litigation groups. From 2011 to 2013, Bursch served as Michigan's 10th Solicitor General. As Michigan Solicitor General, Bursch argued 12 times in the Michigan Supreme Court and eight times in the U.S. Supreme Court. Afterwards, he returned to private practice with Warner Norcross & Judd until 2016, when he formed his own private law firm.

As of 2018, Bursch has appeared in front of the Michigan Supreme Court 27 times, and in front of the US Supreme Court 11 times. He has since represented the respondents in the landmark Supreme Court Case, Obergefell v. Hodges, and is represented Nick Lyon in a case on the Flint Water Crisis. Liberal Supreme Court Justice Elena Kagan has spoken glowingly of Bursch, noting that "When John Bursch speaks, he commands the full and complete attention of the bench.". As of September 5, 2017, Bursch had won 10 of the 14 cases that he argued before the U.S. Supreme Court.

On April 28, 2015, Bursch was one of three attorneys who argued before the U.S. Supreme Court in Obergefell v. Hodges arguing state bans on same-sex marriage to be constitutional. It was the result of a consolidation of six lower-court cases, from the states of Michigan, Ohio, Kentucky, and Tennessee. The original Michigan case was DeBoer v. Snyder, where a same-sex couple argued that Michigan's adoption law was unconstitutional, and sued then Governor Richard Snyder. During this initial case, Bursch was the counsel of record for Governor Snyder. Bursch lost, resulting in the legalization of same-sex marriage everywhere in the United States. Obergefell is considered one of the most important civil rights cases to come before the U.S. Supreme Court in modern history.

He also argued before the Supreme Court in R.G. & G.R. Harris Funeral Homes Inc. v. Equal Employment Opportunity Commission, a case involving employment discrimination where an employee was fired for being transgender. The case was consolidated with Bostock v. Clayton County at the Supreme Court, where the employers lost and gay and transgender people were recognized as protected under Title VII sex-discrimination protections in employment.

Bursch, who had left the position as Michigan Solicitor General, was invited to argue this case before the Supreme Court by then State Attorney General Bill Schuette. He, along with Joseph R. Whalen, an associate solicitor general from Tennessee, represented the states refusing to recognize same-sex marriages. Oral arguments were heard on April 28, 2015. He and Whalen lost the case.

== Recognition ==
Michigan Super Lawyers has listed Bursch as one of Michigan's Top 100 lawyers. He has also been listed in The Best Lawyers in America and is a Fellow of The Litigation Counsel of America. Bursch has received three Distinguished Brief Awards for his advocacy before the Michigan Supreme Court. And in 2010, Bursch was appointed to the American Bar Association committee that reviewed Elena Kagan's writings before her Senate confirmation as a United States Supreme Court Justice. John is a Life Member of the Sixth Circuit Judicial Conference, and in 2011, he was selected to be a Fellow of the Michigan State Bar Association. Also in 2011, Bursch became the inaugural recipient of The Carl and Winifred Lee Honors College Alumni Achievement Award at Western Michigan University. In 2012, the National Association of Attorneys General (NAAG) awarded Bursch and three colleagues a Supreme Court Best Brief Award for their petitioner's brief in Howes v. Fields. In 2013, NAAG again awarded Bursch and two colleagues a Supreme Court Best Brief Award for their cert. petition in Schuette v. Coalition to Defend, and in 2014, Bursch was again awarded the Best Brief Award for his brief in Burt v. Titlow.

Legal offices
Preceded by Eric Restuccia	Solicitor General of Michigan; 2011–2013	Succeeded by Aaron Lindstrom
