= Stephen John Roth =

American judge

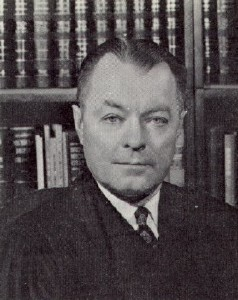
- Roth as U.S. District Judge

Judge of the United States District Court for the Eastern District of Michigan
- In office May 7, 1962 – July 11, 1974
- Appointed by: John F. Kennedy
- Preceded by: John Feikens
- Succeeded by: James Paul Churchill

Michigan Attorney General
- In office 1949–1950
- Governor: G. Mennen Williams
- Preceded by: Eugene F. Black
- Succeeded by: Frank Millard

Personal details
- Born: Stephen John Roth; April 21, 1908 Hungary
- Died: July 11, 1974 (aged 66)
- Education: University of Notre Dame (Ph.B.); University of Michigan Law School (LL.B.)

Stephen John Roth (April 21, 1908 – July 11, 1974) was a United States district judge of the United States District Court for the Eastern District of Michigan.

== Education and career ==
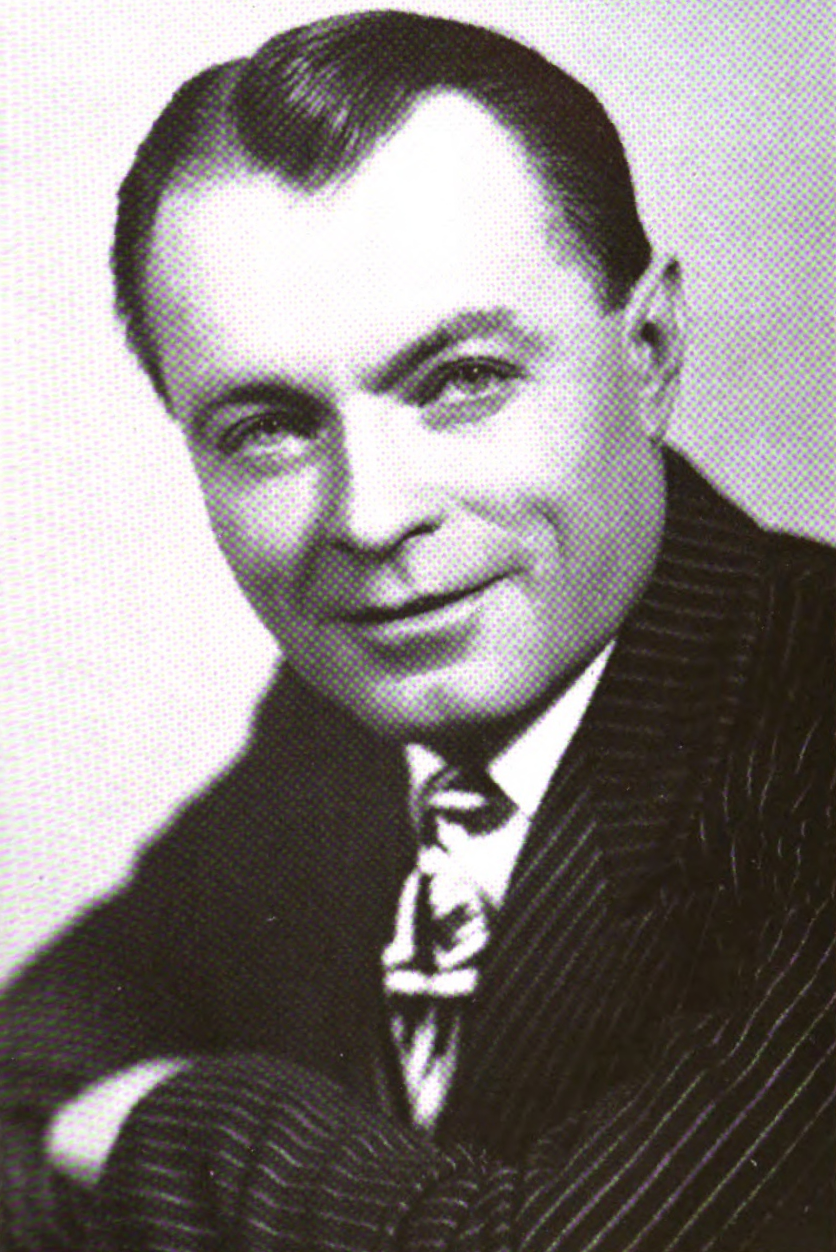
Roth as Michigan Attorney General

Born on April 21, 1908, in Hungary, Roth received a Bachelor of Philosophy degree in 1931 from the University of Notre Dame and a Bachelor of Laws in 1935 from the University of Michigan Law School. He entered private practice in Flint, Michigan from 1935 to 1937, and would subsequently return to private practice in Flint from 1939 to 1941, in 1943, from 1945 to 1948, and from 1950 to 1952. He was an assistant prosecutor in Genesee County, Michigan from 1937 to 1938. He was the prosecutor for Genesee County from 1941 to 1942. He served as a second lieutenant in the United States Army from 1942 to 1945. He was the Attorney General of Michigan from 1949 to 1950. He was a Judge of the Michigan Circuit Court from 1952 to 1962.

== Federal judicial service ==
Roth was nominated by President John F. Kennedy on April 19, 1962, to a seat on the United States District Court for the Eastern District of Michigan vacated by Judge John Feikens. He was confirmed by the United States Senate on May 1, 1962, and received his commission on May 7, 1962. His service ended on July 11, 1974, due to his death.

== Milliken v. Bradley ==
Milliken v. Bradley, 418 U.S. 717 (1974) was a significant case heard by Roth. A suit by the NAACP charging that the Detroit, Michigan public school system was racially segregated as a result of official policies was filed against Michigan Governor William Milliken. After reviewing the case and concluding the system was segregated, Roth ordered the adoption of a desegregation plan that encompassed eighty-five outlying school districts. The United States Court of Appeals for the Sixth Circuit affirmed the metropolitan plan. Decision located at Milliken v. Bradley.

== Sources ==
Party political offices
Preceded by Thurman B. Doyle	Democratic nominee for Michigan Attorney General; 1948, 1950	Succeeded by John T. Damm
Legal offices
Preceded by Eugene F. Black	Michigan Attorney General; 1949–1950	Succeeded by Frank Millard
Preceded by John Feikens	Judge of the United States District Court for the Eastern District of Michigan; 1962–1974	Succeeded by James Paul Churchill
