= Eugene F. Black =

American judge (1903–1990)

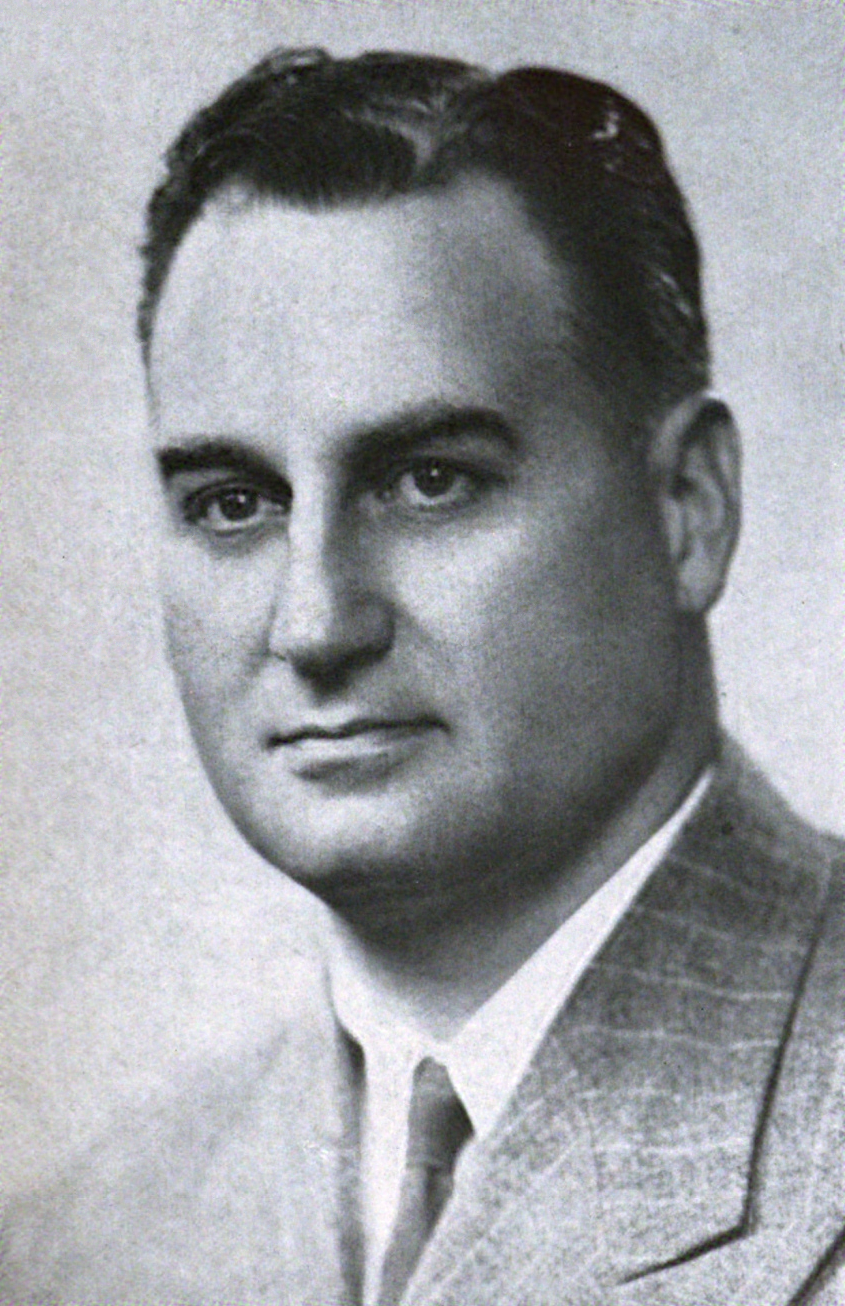
Eugene F. Black c. 1949

Eugene F. Black (1903–1990) was a member of the Michigan Supreme Court from 1956 to 1972.

Black studied law at both the Detroit College of Law and the University of Michigan Law School. He passed the bar in 1925. In 1945, Black was elected Michigan Attorney General as a Republican, but he did not seek re-election two years later. He later served as a judge of the Thirty-First Circuit. In 1955, Black was elected to the Michigan Supreme Court as a Democrat.

== Sources ==
- bio of Black

Party political offices
Preceded by John R. Dethmers	Republican nominee for Michigan Attorney General; 1946	Succeeded by Stuart B. White
Legal offices
Preceded by Foss O. Eldred	Michigan Attorney General; 1947-1949	Succeeded by Stephen John Roth
