= Frank J. Kelley =

American politician (1924–2021)

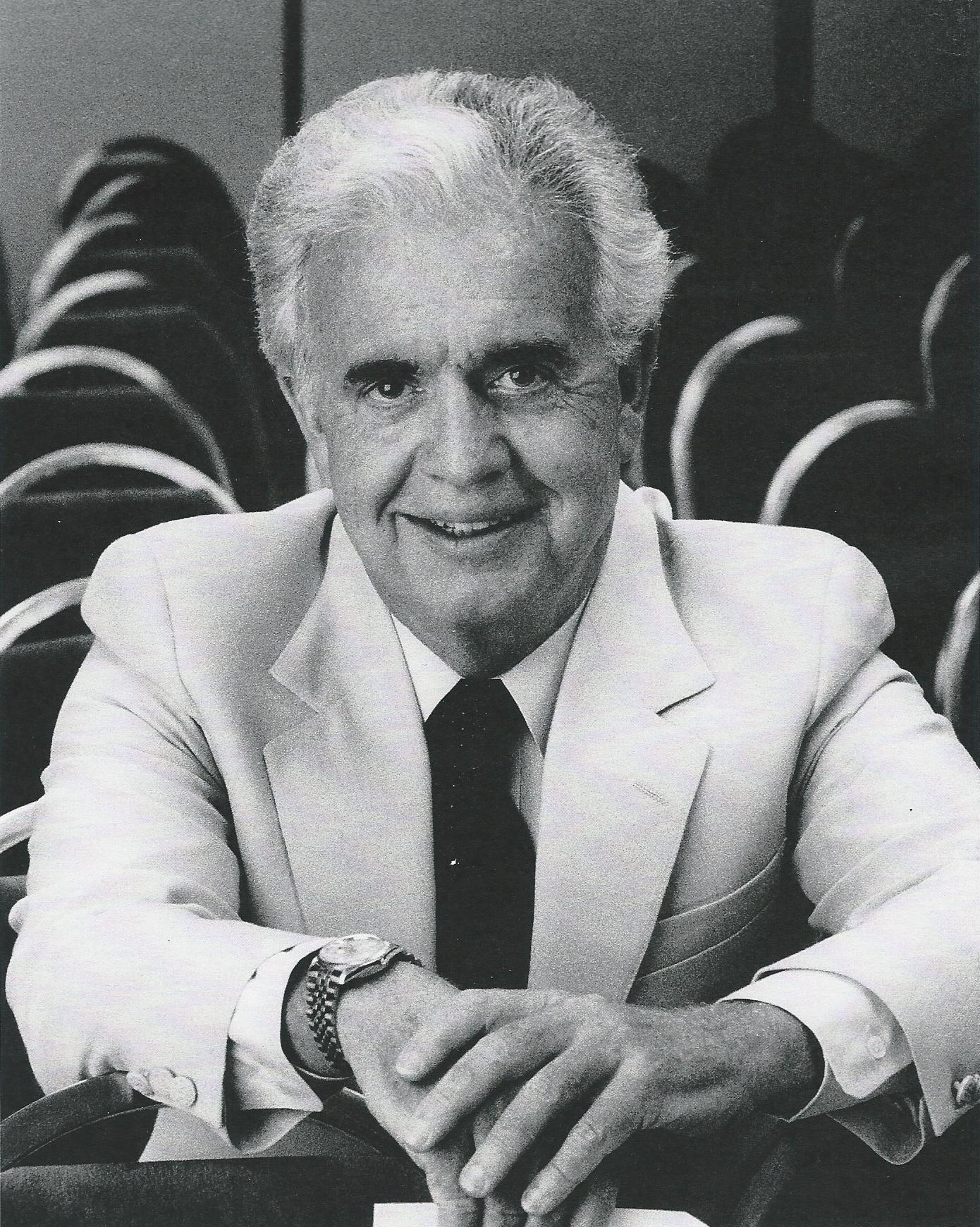
- Kelley in 1996

50th Attorney General of Michigan
- In office December 28, 1961 – January 1, 1999
- Governor: John Swainson; George W. Romney; William Milliken; James Blanchard; John Engler
- Preceded by: Paul L. Adams
- Succeeded by: Jennifer Granholm

Personal details
- Born: Frank Joseph Kelley; December 31, 1924 Detroit, Michigan, U.S.
- Died: March 5, 2021 (aged 96) Naples, Florida, U.S.
- Party: Democratic
- Children: 3
- Education: University of Detroit
- Occupation: Lawyer

Frank Joseph Kelley (December 31, 1924 – March 5, 2021) was an American lawyer and politician who served as the 50th attorney general of the U.S. state of Michigan. His 37-year term of office, from 1961 to 1999, made him both the youngest (36 years old) and oldest (74 years old) attorney general in the state's history, and led to his nickname as the "Eternal General". (Note: A sobriquet allegedly bestowed by Governor John Engler.) He won ten consecutive terms of office. He was the longest serving state attorney general in United States history, until Tom Miller of Iowa surpassed his longevity record in 2019—although Kelley still holds the record for longest continuous tenure as an attorney general. In 37 years of service as Michigan's chief law enforcement officer, he worked in concert with five Michigan governors. (Note: According to Jack Lessenberry, Kelley's biographer, no prior Michigan attorney general had served longer than five years.)

He was cited by all 50 states attorneys general as being the attorney general who most furthered the cause of justice in the United States and was elected president of the National Association of Attorneys General, becoming the only Michigan attorney general so honored. He was the first attorney general in the United States to establish Consumer Protection, Criminal Fraud and Environmental Protection Divisions.

== Early life and education ==
Kelly was born in Detroit, Michigan, on December 31, 1924. His father was a bar ("speakeasy") (Note: In 2015, on Michigan Public TV Kelly said his dad "was as popular as could be with his speakeasy bar in Detroit". Kelley said, "I don't pretend to be as charismatic as my father, but I did like people like my dad, and that helped in my political career and it helped in life, period.") owner and Democratic political appointee. He was an admirer of President Harry Truman, headed the Michigan delegation to the Democratic convention that nominated Truman, and is said to have inspired Kelley to go into public service. (Note: Kelley admitted to an early flirtation with socialism. He credits his father, "My father told me I could be a socialist but to remember 'your name is John Morgan and your address is the barber shop'", he told The Detroit News.)

He received undergraduate and law degrees (1951) from the University of Detroit. Before the construction of the Mackinac Bridge connecting the Upper Peninsula and Lower Peninsula of Michigan, car and train ferries crossed between Mackinaw City, Michigan, and St. Ignace. Kelley worked as a merchant seaman on one of them. He lied about his age to get the job.

Kelley became a lawyer in private practice in Alpena, Michigan, and later received an appointment as Alpena city attorney.

== Attorney General of Michigan (1961–1999) ==
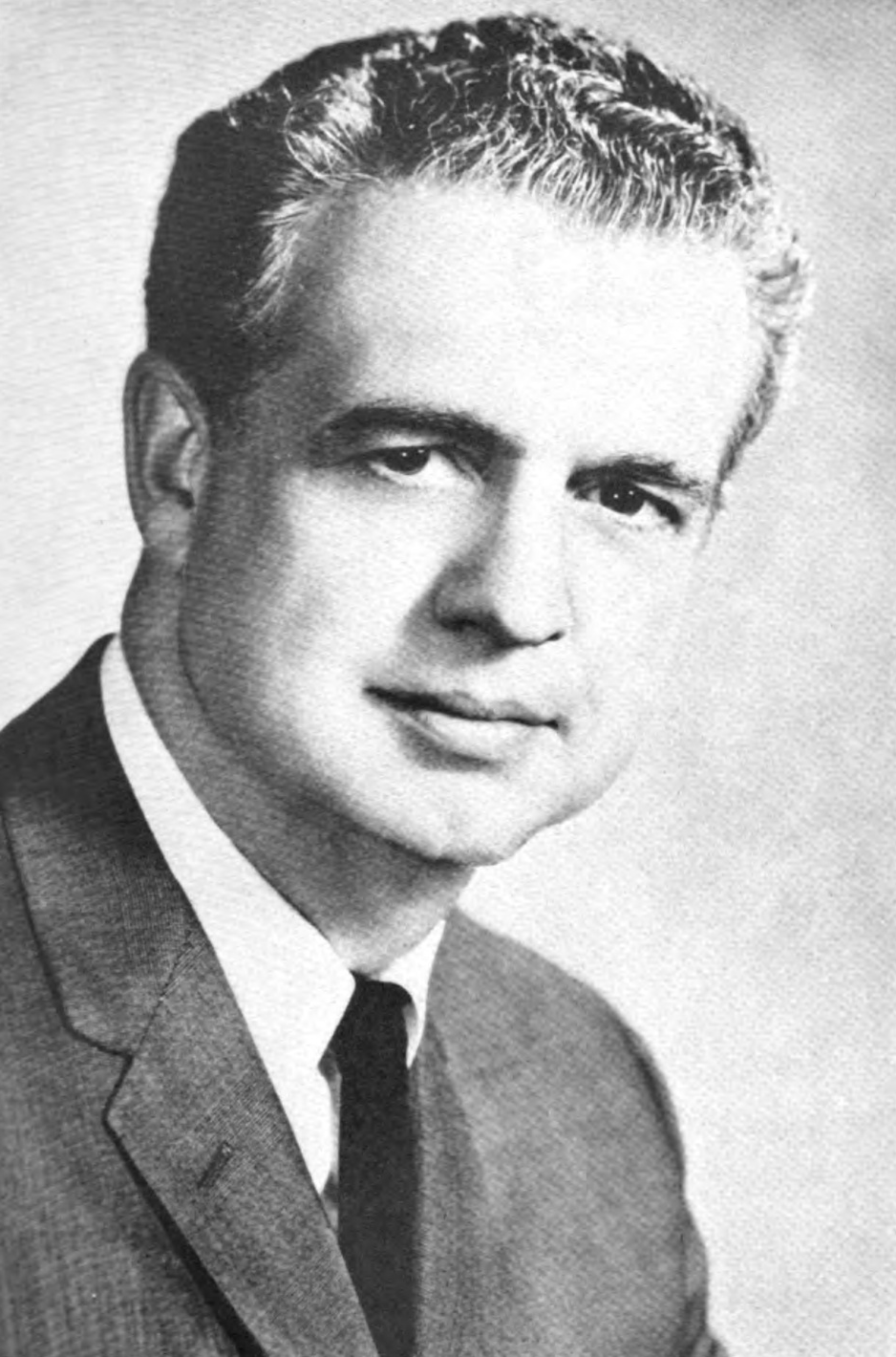
Kelley's official portrait in 1967.

Kelley was appointed Attorney General in 1961 by Governor John Swainson to fill a vacancy left when Paul L. Adams became a Justice of the Michigan Supreme Court. Kelley was elected in his own right as the Democratic nominee ten times before his retirement (Note: Significantly, within a few weeks of his appointment, then U.S. Attorney General Robert F. Kennedy invited him to Washington, "recognizing a potential ally in the then 37-year-old Democrat, also an Irish Catholic." Kelley recalled that Kennedy advised: "Reach out against injustice wherever you see it and protect the public.") from the position in 1999, when he was succeeded by the future Governor of Michigan Jennifer Granholm. Governor Granholm has publicly acknowledged Kelley to be one of her mentors and closest advisors.

His tenure as attorney general spanned the administrations of five Michigan governors. (Note: From Democrat John Swainson through Republican John Engler, who called Kelley the nation's "most distinguished attorney general". Engler suggested that they sometimes differed "on the wisdom of a decision but his office as a result of his leadership always represented the governor's office with great effectiveness" and "I could not have had a finer lawyer." Kelly recalled in 2015 that Engler "loved every corporation he ever met". As Governor James Blanchard said: "Frank J. Kelley was not just a legend in Michigan politics, he was a giant in American public service", Blanchard said. "He belongs to an era of civility, decency, non-partisanship and respect for others and the rule of law." In a statement after Kelley's death, Engler said there were times he and Kelley differed "on the wisdom of a decision but his office as a result of his leadership always represented the governor's office with great effectiveness." Former Gov. Jim Blanchard, a Democrat, said Kelley was a mentor to thousands of young lawyers, judges and aspiring public servants. "Frank ran his Attorney General's Office with integrity and honor for four decades. Frank Kelley was a pioneer in consumer protection and environmental protection, indeed among the first champions in the United States.")

Kelley was the first state attorney general to establish both a consumer protection and environmental protection division. He became nationally recognized in the area of consumer protection, appearing annually on the NBC show Dateline to discuss issues such as item pricing. He also gained statewide acclaim for battling utilities and insurance companies on rate increases. President Bill Clinton acknowledged Kelley as a leading force in the Tobacco Master Settlement Agreement, which resulted in most states receiving large multi-year payments to compensate them for the costs of tobacco-related illnesses.

He had many accomplishments as Attorney General:

- He redirected the Attorney General's Office to concentrate efforts on "the public interest, especially on consumer protection and environmental issues". The white-collar crime unit he created accused 62 Metro Detroit auto dealerships of price fixing. And he also filed usury lawsuits against four big retailers. He launched a consumer fraud hotline. He issued attorney general opinions outlawing state prohibitions on price and brand-name alcohol advertising.
- Kelley became a beacon to the state, and an advisor, inspiration and highly-valued mentor to many notable public officials. (Note: Governor Gretchen Whitmer said: "Frank J. Kelley was one of my absolute favorite people from whom to get advice, perspective or humor ... He was a never-ending fount of wisdom and fun. ... From his college days to the battles he fought as Michigan's longest serving attorney general, he always had stories and insight into the human condition and generosity of time. I know I am among countless, fortunate people who had the honor of working with the brilliant and irascible Frank J. Kelley." Michigan Attorney General Dana Nessel wrote, "And his energy and genuine passion for public service inspired countless others to likewise dedicate their talents in service to the people of Michigan." Whitmer was also attorney general, and her mother, Sharon Reisig Whitmer, worked for Kelley as an assistant attorney general.)
- According to The Detroit News and the Associated Press, on a bipartisan basis, he fostered and worked with "allies in the legislative and executive branches" helping to pass model laws, including one of the first state consumer protection act, freedom of information act, and open meeting law. The two latter laws opened up public administration transparency and accountability.
- He facilitated raising of rural interstate freeway speed limits.
- The department sued tobacco companies for recoupment of state Medicaid spending caused by smoking-related illnesses. He played a pivotal role in achieving the Tobacco Master Settlement Agreement.
- He was a consistent and effective opponent of highway advertising billboards, which he likened to an environmental disaster and eyesore. A change in the state law occurred under his watch.
- Through the Michigan Public Service Commission, he fought Consumers Power's Midland, Michigan, nuclear power plant as it drowned in cost overruns in the 1980s. The court battle scuttled the utility's plans to complete the plant and pass the costs on to rate paying consumers.
- He was committed to environmental protection. The department continues to bear fruit, Attorney General Dana Nessel said—noting that at least one environmental lawyer working on the PFAS lawsuit was hired by Kelley. On January 14, 2020, he made a final public appearances at the Frank J. Kelley Library in a press conference in the G. Mennen Williams building (Note: The state government's law building, G. Mennen Williams Building in Lansing, constructed in 1967, was dedicated in Williams's honor in 1997.) where Nessel announced Michigan's lawsuit against 17 chemical companies accused of being responsible for PFOA and PFAA and PFAS contamination.
- Two successor attorneys general opined that he helped establish benchmarks for public servant conduct. (Note: Former Republican Attorney General Bill Schuette said Kelley "was a remarkable man and led a remarkable life." "He established the standard of conduct for Michigan Attorneys General." He had a "Great sense of humor and [was] a wonderful public servant. A legend in Michigan. He understood bi-partisan politics. We all will miss him." That sentiment was underscored by Dana Nessel.) He was characterized as "a giant in the American public service", who never forgot he was "the peoples' lawyer". The longtime Democrat joked that he lived in serene comfort on a Lansing lake "like a Republican". Upon his death, tributes from politicians and lawyers were effusive.

He had a national impact and became president of the National Association of Attorneys General, becoming the only Michigan attorney general to do so. It honored him by creating and naming after him the Kelley–Wyman Award for outstanding service and national contributions by an attorney general. He was elected president of the National Association of Attorneys General, the sole Michigan attorney general so honored. All 50 states attorneys general said he typified the attorney general who most furthered the cause of justice in the United States. He was the first attorney general in the United States to establish Consumer Protection, Criminal Fraud and Environmental Protection Divisions. His guidance led to the passage of Michigan's Open Meetings Act and Freedom of Information Act.

While Attorney General, Kelley ran for election to the U.S. Senate in 1972, but lost to incumbent Robert P. Griffin. He later credited the controversy over desegregation school busing and the weakness of Democratic presidential nominee George McGovern as major contributing factors in his 47– 53 percent loss.

His ten electoral successes were unequaled both in terms of duration and the magnitude of his victories. (Note: "One disadvantage of Michigan term limits is that the electoral success of Michigan Attorney General Frank J. Kelley will never be replicated. Over 10 elections, Michigan voters acknowledged the dedication to public service that Kelley embodied with more than 16 million votes—nearly 6 million more than his opponents.")

== Term limits ==
In 1993, the Michigan Constitution was amended to place term limits on many elected offices, including Attorney General. Kelley's successors are limited to two four-year terms in office. During the debate over term limits, some proponents of term limits pointed to Kelley and Michigan's then Secretary of State Richard H. Austin, who served from 1971 to 1995, as examples of elected officials who had stayed in office too long. However, they did not explain why, if that was true, voters continued re-electing Kelley, or why Austin was in fact finally defeated. Upon his retirement, Kelley was still eligible for one more term but said that while he was certain he could have won a final term, he wanted to leave on his terms "while he was still young and vital".

== Later career ==
After his departure from the Attorney General's office, Kelley founded Kelley Cawthorne, a prominent lobbying and law firm in Lansing, Michigan. In private practice he represented the late Marge Schott during the sale of her majority interest in the Cincinnati Reds Major League Baseball franchise. He also represented a host of major companies such as DTE Energy, Blue Cross & Blue Shield of Michigan, and Palace Sports & Entertainment/Detroit Pistons organization. He later sold the firm, but remained a consultant for it till the end of 2014.

In 1999, Governor John Engler named him to a seat on the Mackinac Island State Park Commission which controls 80% of the island. In 2007, Democratic Governor Jennifer Granholm named him chair of the Commission. As chair he replaced his business partner, Dennis O. Cawthorne, a former Republican Leader of the Michigan Legislature. Granholm also appointed Kelley to the State Ethics Board.

Kelley thought he was lucky—"a political survivor ... blessed with certain instinctual gifts, a way with people that enabled him to be elected class president seven times in school and attorney general 10 times afterward."

== Blunders ==
- As Michigan's Constitution empowered the Attorney General to intervene statewide on behalf of the people, he chose to personally prosecute the alleged killers of Grady Little, a young black man attacked and knifed to death by a group of white men in the Palmer Park neighborhood in Detroit. The Detroit Police Department investigated the matter and recommended issuance of an arrest warrant. Wayne County Prosecutor Samuel Olson refused the warrant. (Note: "At a time when whites comprised two thirds of Detroit's population and made up an even greater share of Wayne County, Kelley wondered whether the prosecutor was engaging in racist politics. When Olson failed to act, Kelley filed charges and waged his own criminal prosecution. Kelley said, '[A]ll hell broke loose.' He faced a hostile judge, who immediately reduced the murder charges to manslaughter. No blacks were included in the pool from which the jury would be drawn. And in a bizarre and indefensible maneuver, the defense in the case called Olson to testify about his opinion of the defendant's culpability.") He suffered political damage when the "trial, with an all-White jury, was a farce that taught the new attorney general a bitter lesson: Seeking justice doesn't necessarily mean it will be won." On the other hand, it established his bona fides in Detroit's black community.
- In 1975, he went to Waterford Township to supervise an unsuccessful digging expedition for the corpse of Teamsters President Jimmy Hoffa.
- He denied involvement with an alleged Southfield prostitute who had his name in a "$100-a-night" box file.
- In 1972, Kelley acted on higher political aspirations, losing a Senate challenge to Republican Robert Griffin.

Kelley never aspired for the governorship, which position he deemed to be weaker than the attorney general's office. (Note: In contrast to his successors Jennifer Granholm, a Democrat who served two terms as governor, and Mike Cox, a Republican who lost the 2010 primary to former Governor Rick Snyder. Also, GOP former Attorney General Bill Schuette lost his gubernatorial bid in 2018.)

== Personal life and death ==
His wife, Nancy, died due to complications from a brain aneurysm in October 2015. Kelley had three children from his first marriage. In later life he wintered in Naples, Florida, and lived the rest of the year at his home in Haslett, Michigan. He died in March 2021 in a nursing home in Florida at the age of 96. Kelley's remains are to be cremated and his ashes interred on Mackinac Island. He is survived also by one grandson. (Note: "He was a great dad and husband, who had a great sense of humor. He was a loyal friend and mentor to many, he considered public service as an honor. He loved the law and his loyalty to the people of Michigan was unwavering."– family statement.)

== Legacy ==
The Michigan State University College of Law has established the Frank J. Kelley Institute of Ethics in his name.

In 1998, the State Bar of Michigan created the Frank J. Kelley Distinguished Public Service Award and named him its first recipient. "This award recognizes extraordinary governmental service by a member of the State Bar of Michigan."

On October 24, 2013, the walkway in Lansing between the Michigan State Capitol and the Hall of Justice was named the Frank J. Kelley Walkway. As Kelley himself stoically observed in 2013: "Most of this stuff is done posthumously. I'm just lucky to have lived to the ripe old age."

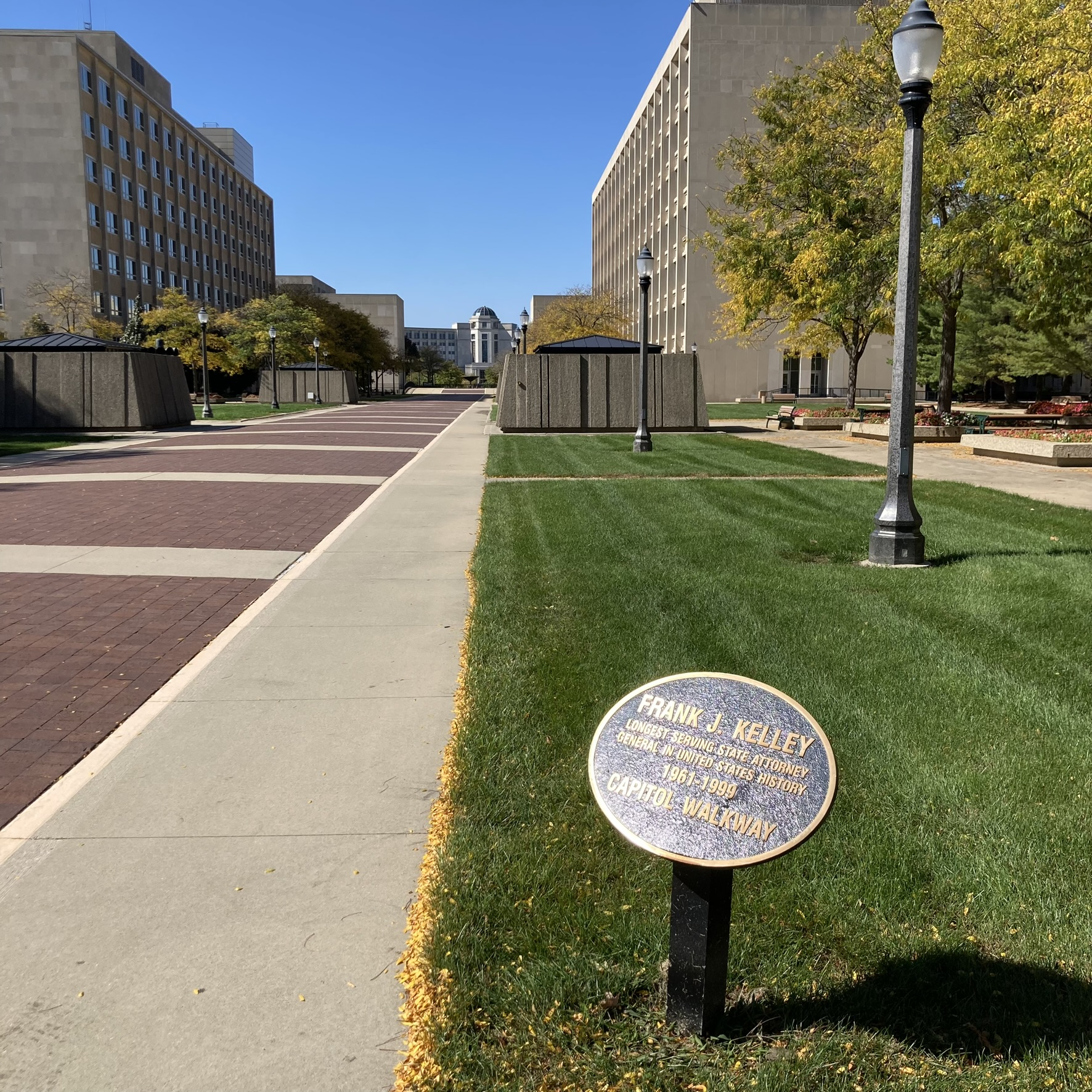
Frank J. Kelley Capitol Walkway

In 2015, Wayne State University Press published his autobiography, titled The People's Lawyer: The Life and Times of Frank J. Kelley, the Nation's Longest Serving Attorney General. Kelley's co-author was syndicated political columnist Jack Lessenberry. Lessenberry wrote that Kelly began in "the rollicking days of Prohibition", and with inspiration from John, Bobby and Teddy Kennedy, "went on to essentially invent consumer and environmental protection in the state of Michigan", and "crusaded for civil rights and equal representation before it was popular to do so."

Michigan Governor Gretchen Whitmer ordered the lowering to half staff of U.S. and Michigan flags within the Michigan State Capitol Complex and on all public places in honor of his service.

Party political offices
Preceded by Paul L. Adams	Democratic nominee for Michigan Attorney General; 1962, 1964, 1966, 1970, 1974, 1978, 1982, 1986, 1990, 1994	Succeeded by Jennifer Granholm
Preceded by G. Mennen Williams	Democratic nominee for U.S. Senator from Michigan (Class 2); 1972	Succeeded by Carl Levin
Legal offices
Preceded by Paul L. Adams	Michigan Attorney General; 1961 – 1998	Succeeded by Jennifer M. Granholm
