= L. Brooks Patterson =

American lawyer and politician (1939–2019)

Oakland County County Executive
- In office January 1, 1993 – August 3, 2019
- Preceded by: Daniel T. Murphy
- Succeeded by: David Coulter

Personal details
- Born: Lewis Brooks Patterson; January 4, 1939 Detroit, Michigan, U.S.
- Died: August 3, 2019 (aged 80) Independence Township, Michigan, U.S.
- Party: Republican
- Spouse: Kathy (div.)
- Children: 4
- Education: University of Detroit (BA), University of Detroit School of Law (JD)
- Profession: lawyer, politician

Lewis Brooks Patterson (January 4, 1939 – August 3, 2019) was an American lawyer and politician who served as County Executive of Oakland County, Michigan, from 1992 until his death in 2019. Often controversial, he is known for promoting segregation and exacerbating racial and class tensions throughout Metro Detroit.

== Education ==
Born in Detroit, Michigan, Patterson graduated from the University of Detroit Jesuit High School and Academy in 1957. He served in the United States Army from 1962 to 1964. He received a Bachelor's degree from the University of Detroit, and his Juris Doctor in 1967 from its law school. In 2005, he was Alumnus of the Year at his alma mater.

== Career ==
Following Patterson's graduation from the University of Detroit, Patterson relocated to Oakland County. Eventually, he opened a law practice in Pontiac, where he took segregationist advocate Irene McCabe as a client. During his time representing Irene McCabe, he became a vocal and polarizing advocate against integration in Pontiac schools.

Following 16 years as the prosecutor of Oakland County, he was elected in 1992 to the office of county executive. He was re-elected to a sixth term in 2012.

During his years as county executive, Patterson faced serious health problems, twice undergoing surgery to place stents to control blood flow and, in August 2012, being severely injured as the passenger in a car crash when his Cadillac was T-boned by a Volkswagen test car. The incident left him hospitalized for a month and then placed in a medical facility for physical rehabilitation. His driver was paralyzed. While in care in October 2012, Patterson dismissed claims that his injuries left him unfit to serve if reelected. Patterson often used a wheelchair due to the injuries he suffered in the accident. In March 2019 Patterson revealed he has stage 4 pancreatic cancer, and would not seek re-election the following year.

== Personal life ==
Patterson and his wife divorced in 2002. In 2007, Patterson lost his son, Brooks Stuart Patterson, in a snowmobile accident and, later that year, lost his twin brother Stephen Patterson. In 2008, he established the Brooksie Way Half Marathon in memory of his son. The event is sponsored by local businesses and draws participants from the Oakland University campus and area residents.

Patterson died on August 3, 2019. He was diagnosed with pancreatic cancer earlier in the year.

In July 2023, Patterson's daughter, Mary Margaret Patterson, announced she was weighing a run for Oakland County Executive, but later dropped out.

== Notes ==
Party political offices
| Preceded by Stephen C. Bransdorfer | Republican nominee for Michigan Attorney General; 1982 | Succeeded by Robert Hardy Cleland |
