= Serpent labret with articulated tongue =

Gold Aztec lip plug from c. 1300–1521 AD

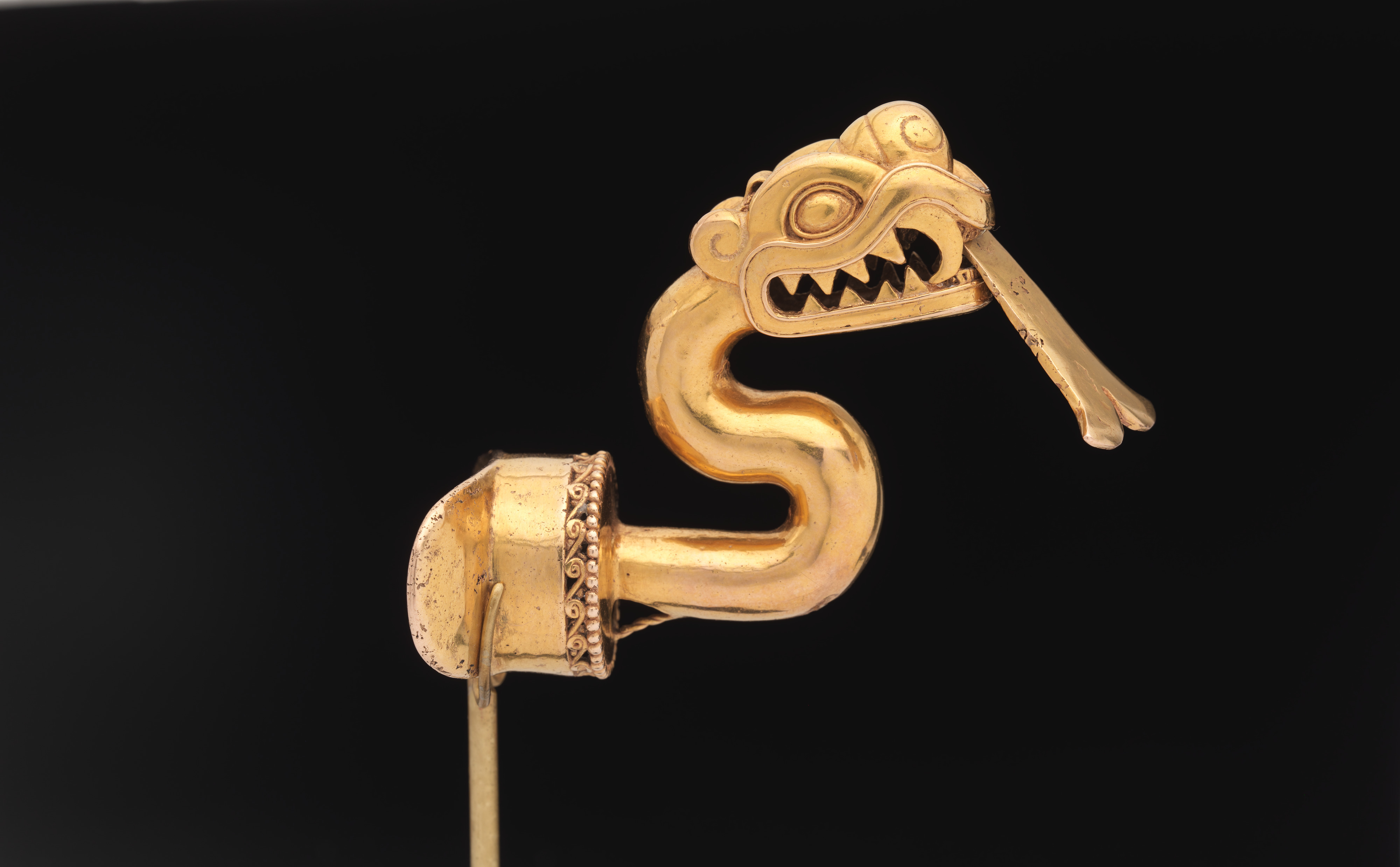
- Positioned with tongue extended
- Material: Alloy of gold, copper, silver
- Length: 6.7 centimetres (2 5/8 inches)
- Height: 6.7 cm (2 5/8 in)
- Width: 4.4 cm (1 3/4 in)
- Weight: 51 grams (1.81 ounces)
- Created: c. 1300–1521 AD
- Present location: Metropolitan Museum of Art, New York City
- Registration: 2016.64

The serpent labret with articulated tongue is a gold-alloy body ornament from the Aztec culture of the mid-second millennium AD. Designed to be inserted into a piercing below the lower lip, it depicts a fanged serpent poised to strike, with a bifurcated tongue hanging from its mouth. The tongue, which is moveable and retractable, would have swung from side to side with its wearer's movements. Art historians have described it as an ingenious example of Aztec metalworking, and among the finest Aztec gold objects known to survive.

Labrets, or lip plugs, were associated with the nobility in Aztec culture, worn by rulers and meted out as honours; even then, gold labrets probably remained the province of the elite. Worn prominently on the face, the labret probably symbolised the wearer's status and eloquence, and possibly divine right to rule. Gold was a hallmark of divinity—Tōnatiuh icuitl, translated as 'the excrement of the sun', was believed to be left behind as the sun god traversed the underworld at night—and eloquence a hallmark of nobility: The title for the leader of the Aztec empire was huei tlahtoani, literally 'Great Speaker'. The serpent may represent Xiuhcoatl, the fire serpent wielded as a weapon by the sun god Huītzilōpōchtli.

This labret is dated to 1300–1521, the period during which the Aztecs flourished. It is 6.7 cm (2 5/8 in) high, 4.4 cm (1 3/4 in) wide, 6.7 cm (2 5/8 in) deep, and weighs 51 grams (1.81 oz). Consisting of a gold, copper and silver alloy, it was made by lost-wax casting. Although such goldwork is traditionally ascribed to Mixtec makers either to the south or stationed in Tenochtitlan, the Aztecs, particularly by the time of the Aztec empire, may have also had their own sophisticated goldworking workshops.

This labret was publicly known by 1937, when it was placed on long-term loan at the American Museum of Natural History. It spent much of its succeeding history in private ownership but on display, then was purchased in 2016 by the Metropolitan Museum of Art.

== Background ==
=== Aztecs ===
The Aztecs were a Mesoamerican culture that flourished in central Mexico from around 1300 to 1521 AD. According to their legends, the broad outlines of which find some support in the written and archaeological record, the Aztecs originated in Aztlán—a spot perhaps to the northwest of Mexico City and the origin of the name "Aztec", literally 'person of Aztlán'. The stories then tell of several centuries of migration, after which the Aztecs founded Tenochtitlan (modern-day Mexico City) on an island in Lake Texcoco in 1325. In 1428, after a century of various alliances and friction with the surrounding populations, the Aztec empire was founded. Also known as the Triple Alliance, the empire was a coalition of the city-states Tenochtitlan, Texcoco and Tlacopan.

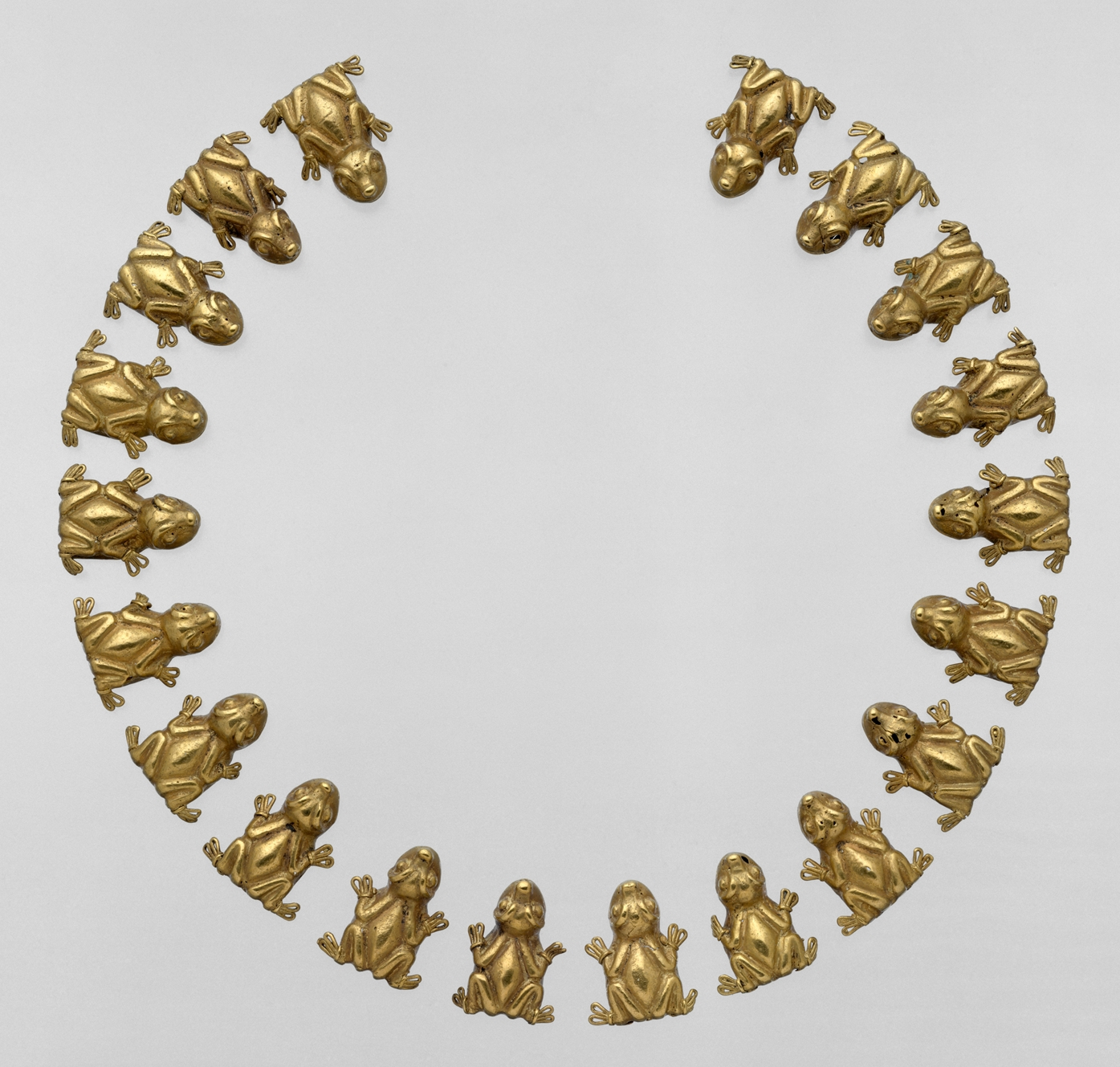
Aztec/Mixtec necklace with gold frog-shaped beads

The Aztec empire exacted a heavy tribute (or tax) of gold from the surrounding regions—perhaps amounting to 500 kilograms (1,100 lb) a year—and the Aztecs had a rich tradition of goldwork to match. The manufacture of such objects at this time has traditionally been attributed to the Mixtecs to the south, or to Mixtec makers stationed in Tenochtitlan. More recent research has suggested that the Aztecs had their own sophisticated goldworking operation, particularly by the end of the fifteenth century.

Though the gold tribute would have been sufficient to manufacture tens of thousands of small- to medium-sized ornaments each year, fewer than 400 are known to survive, 267 of which were found during excavations at Templo Mayor—the main temple in Tenochtitlan. In 1519, the Spanish conquistador Hernán Cortés landed on the shores of Mexico, and by 1521, he had annihilated the Aztec empire. The Spanish were entranced by, and plundered, the luxury that they found; seeing the gold and silver, Cortés wrote that "no smith in the world could have done better". The German artist Albrecht Dürer, who saw some of the plunder that was shipped back to Europe, wrote that "In all my life I have never seen anything that has so delighted my heart as did these objects; for there I saw strange works of art and have been left amazed by the subtle inventiveness of the men of far off lands." But "Maddeningly enough," wrote the curator Jay Levenson, "although Dürer appears always to have had a sketchbook with him, no drawings of his are known of the now-lost masterpieces which he described." Almost all of the gold was swiftly melted down, and turned into ingots.

=== Labrets ===
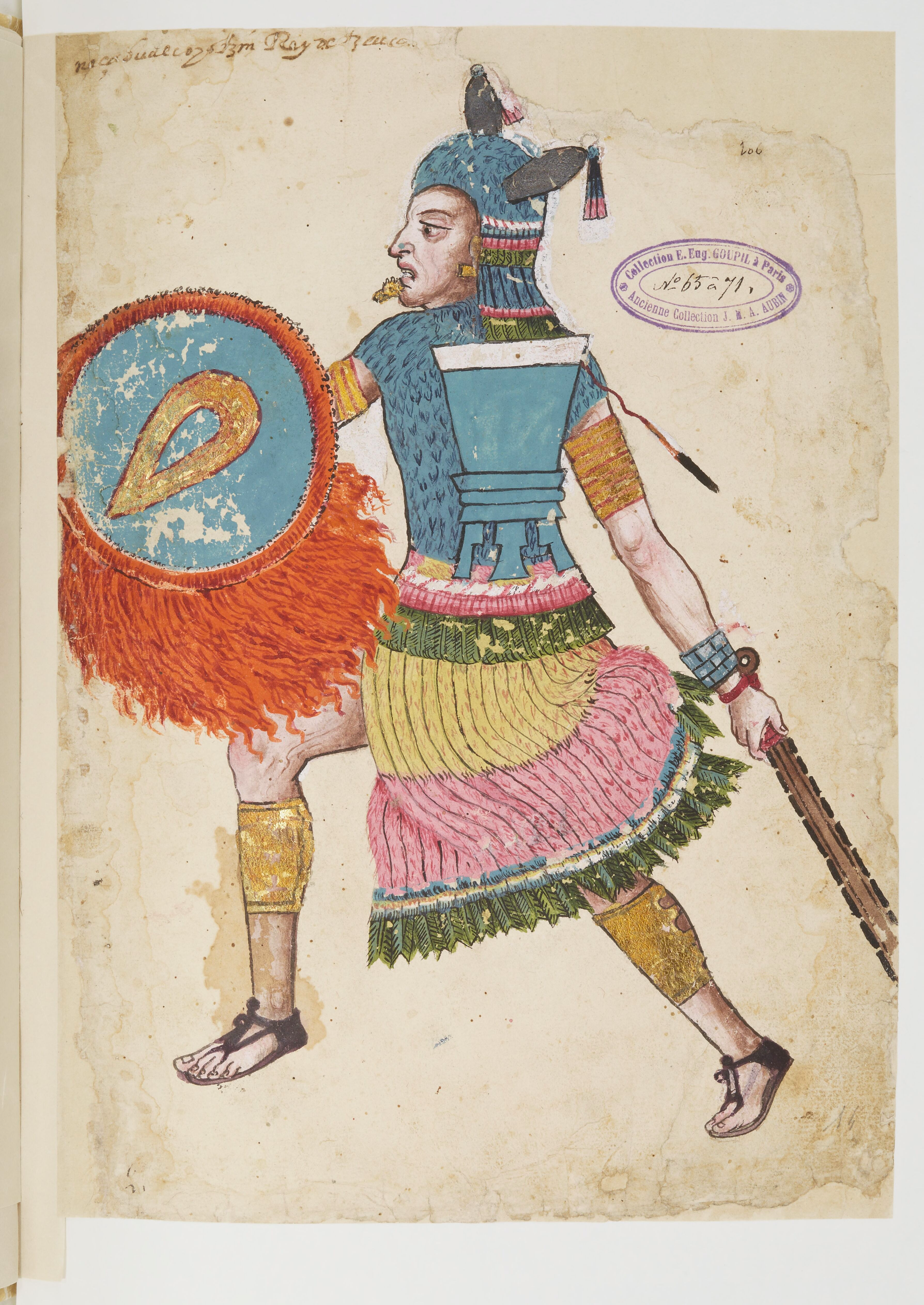
The Aztec ruler Nezahualcoyotl, shown in the Codex Ixtlilxochitl wearing a labret

Labrets, or lip plugs, are a type of jewellery inserted through a piercing below the lower lip. Called tentetl (literally, 'lip stone(s)' (Note: Classical Nahuatl did not have plural forms for inanimate nouns, such that the word tentetl was singular or plural depending on context.)) in the Aztec language Nahuatl, labrets were associated with status and power. The Franciscan friar Bernardino de Sahagún, writing in the sixteenth-century Florentine Codex, records a labret as among the emperor Moctezuma II's coronation regalia. The Dominican friar Diego Durán, meanwhile, writing in The History of the Indies of New Spain, records labrets as among the presents Moctezuma bestowed upon visiting lords for the occasion. Other such regalia and gifts included diadems in turquoise and gold, bracelets, calf bands, ear ornaments, and ear and nose plugs.

Surviving Aztec codices, or manuscripts, record in both text and illustration numerous different types of labrets, from plain to elaborate; many different words were used to describe the different types, certain of which were bestowed or worn on certain occasions. (Note: Other words used for more specific types of labrets included tençacatl ('lip straw', perhaps longer and thinner), tencololli ('something bent for the lips', designating curved labrets), teocuitlatentetl (gold labret), apatlactempilolli coztic teocuitlatl (gold labret shaped like a broad-leafed water plant), ahuictempilolli (labret shaped like a boating pole), atototempilolli (labret shaped like a pelican), metztempilolli (labret shaped like a crescent), xiuhcoatempilolli (labret shaped like a fire serpent), tehuilotentetl (labret made of rock crystal), and chalchiuhtençacanecuilli (curved greenstone labret).) For example, labrets were among the awards bestowed upon successful warriors—the Codex Mendoza, apparently commissioned by a Spanish colonial administrator to record pre-conquest traditions, depicts the highest-ranking noble-warriors wearing long, hanging labrets. Likewise, merchants who returned from perilous trips to foreign lands were sometimes rewarded by being permitted to wear gold ornaments and amber labrets to mark themselves among the nobility.

The link between labrets and the nobility may have been reinforced by the link between the nobility and eloquence. The title for the leader of the Aztec empire was huei tlahtoani, literally 'Great Speaker'. Eloquence was expected of nobles; according to Durán, noble children "were told to speak without stuttering, without nervousness or haste". Positioned on the face directly below the lips, labrets likely highlighted the eloquence expected of nobles, and underscored their right to speak and be heard. Somewhat contradictorily, however, the wearing of a labret may have made speaking more difficult.

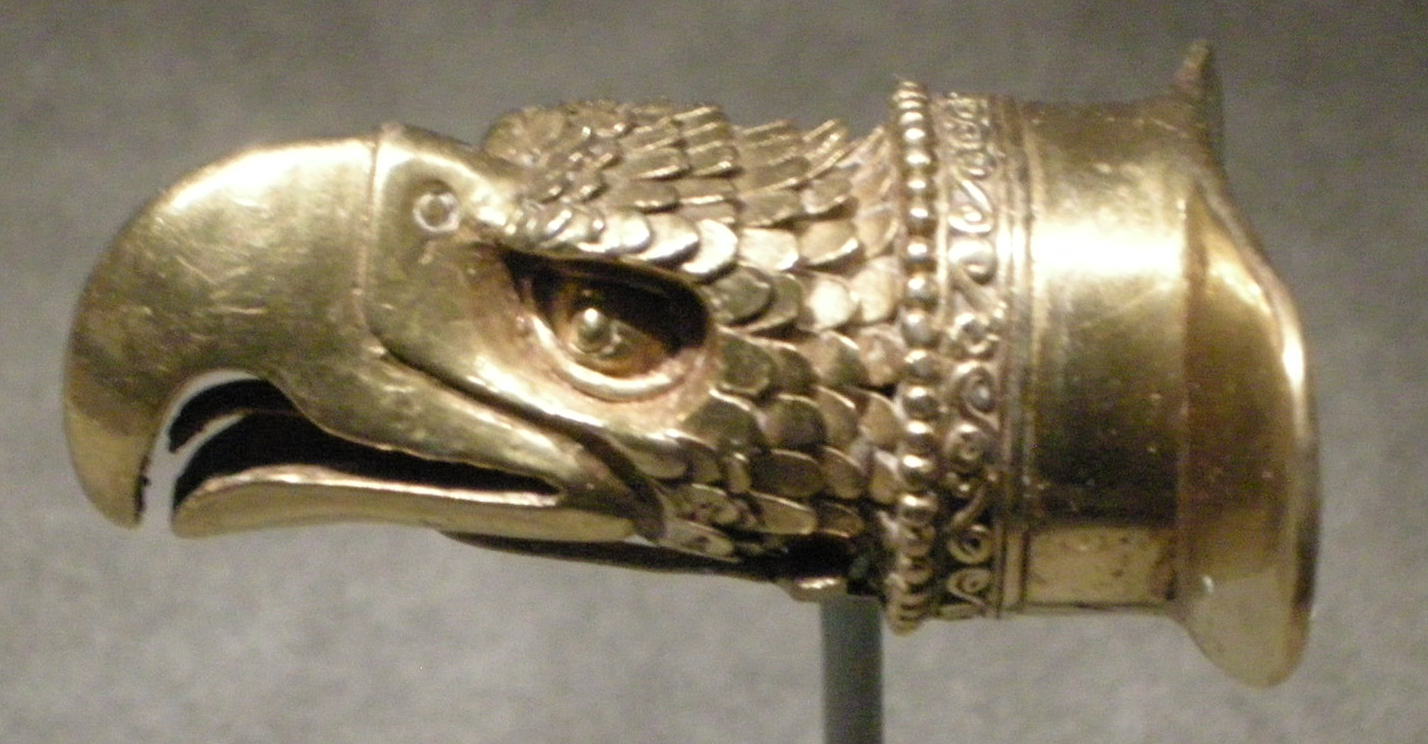
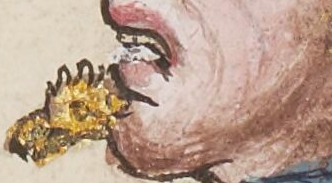
The eagle labret in the Museo Civico d'Arte Antica mirrors the one worn by Nezahualcoyotl in the Codex Ixtlilxochitl.

Also in the Florentine Codex, Sahagún records apparel worn by Moctezuma when he danced, including different types of labrets: cylindrical examples made of crystal, turquoise, or green stone, and ones made of gold, including eagles and "fire serpents". Although most surviving examples are plain, made of obsidian or greenstone, several are reminiscent of Sahagún's description. Gold eagle labrets are owned by the Metropolitan Museum of Art ("the Met"), the Saint Louis Art Museum, the Los Angeles County Museum of Art, and the Museo Civico d'Arte Antica in Turin. The Met also owns an eagle in jadeite. The Turin example, in particular, closely parallels one worn by the Aztec ruler Nezahualcoyotl in his depiction in the Codex Ixtlilxochitl, the relevant portion of which was derived from the memories of a mestizo descendant of Aztec royalty.

The Princeton University Art Museum owns a gold curassow labret, and the Weltmuseum in Vienna a bird's head in gold and rock crystal. Another gold bird's head is in the American Museum of Natural History in New York City, and two others were sold by the auction house Giquello in 2021, for €64,202 (equivalent to US$76,000), and by Sotheby's in 2024, for US$10,800 (each including fees). A gold bird's head, possibly of a parrot, was owned by the archaeologist Suzannah Beck Vaillant as of 1962. Dumbarton Oaks in Washington, D.C., has a gold head of a bird, reptile, or composite animal. Also in Washington, the National Museum of the American Indian has a gold bird's head labret, alongside a gold serpent that, like the Met's example, features a movable tongue. The Eskenazi Museum of Art at Indiana University Bloomington holds a gold bird's head that may represent the wind god Ehecatl; another gold labret representing Ehecatl was auctioned in the same 2021 sale by Giquello, but was bought in against an estimate of €20,000–25,000 (equivalent to US$24,000–30,000). The Seattle Art Museum also holds a gold labret that, while plainer, may represent the fang of a serpent or beak of a bird.

Aztec labrets
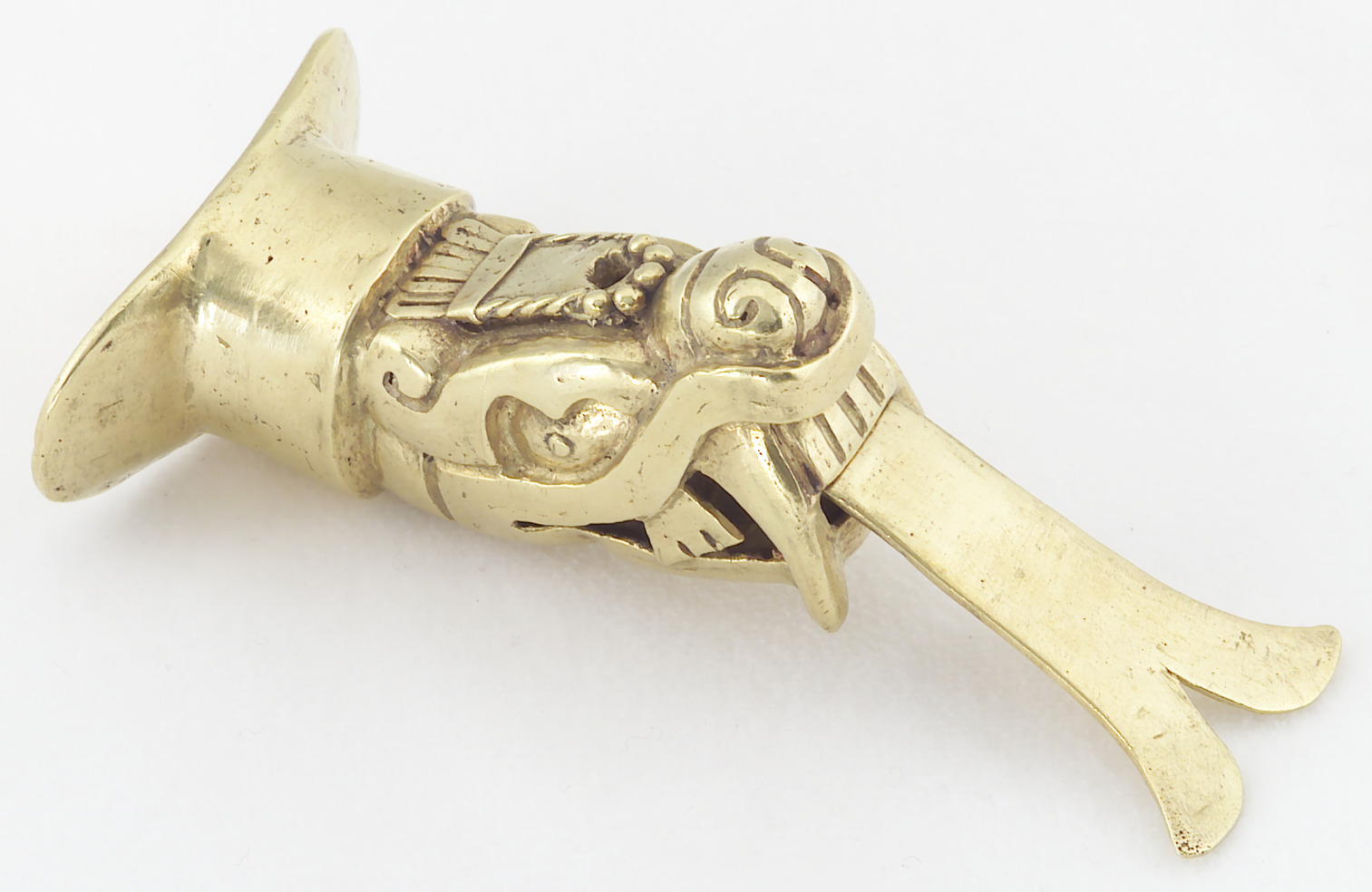
Gold serpent's head (National Museum of the American Indian)

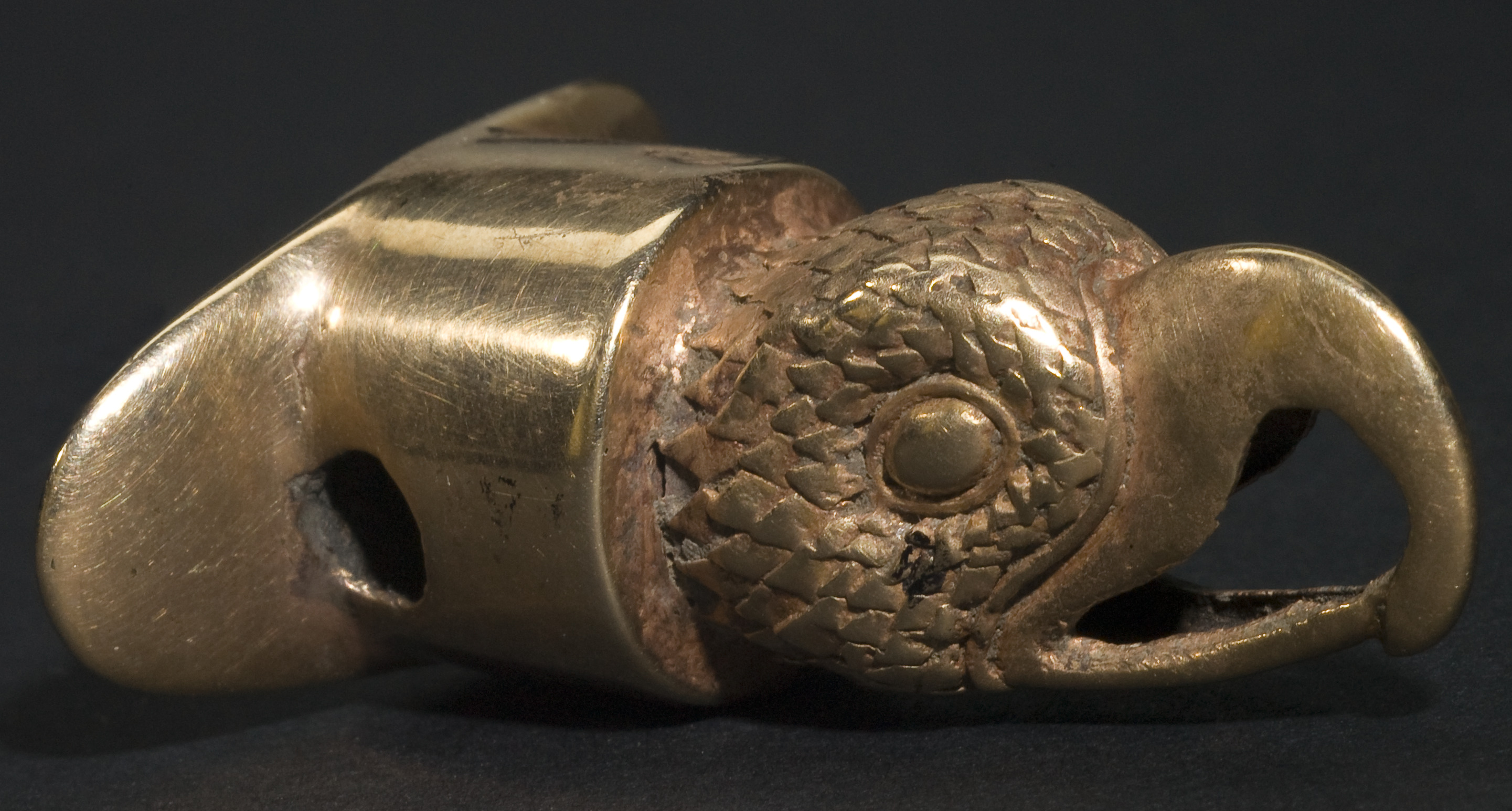
Gold eagle head (Saint Louis Art Museum)

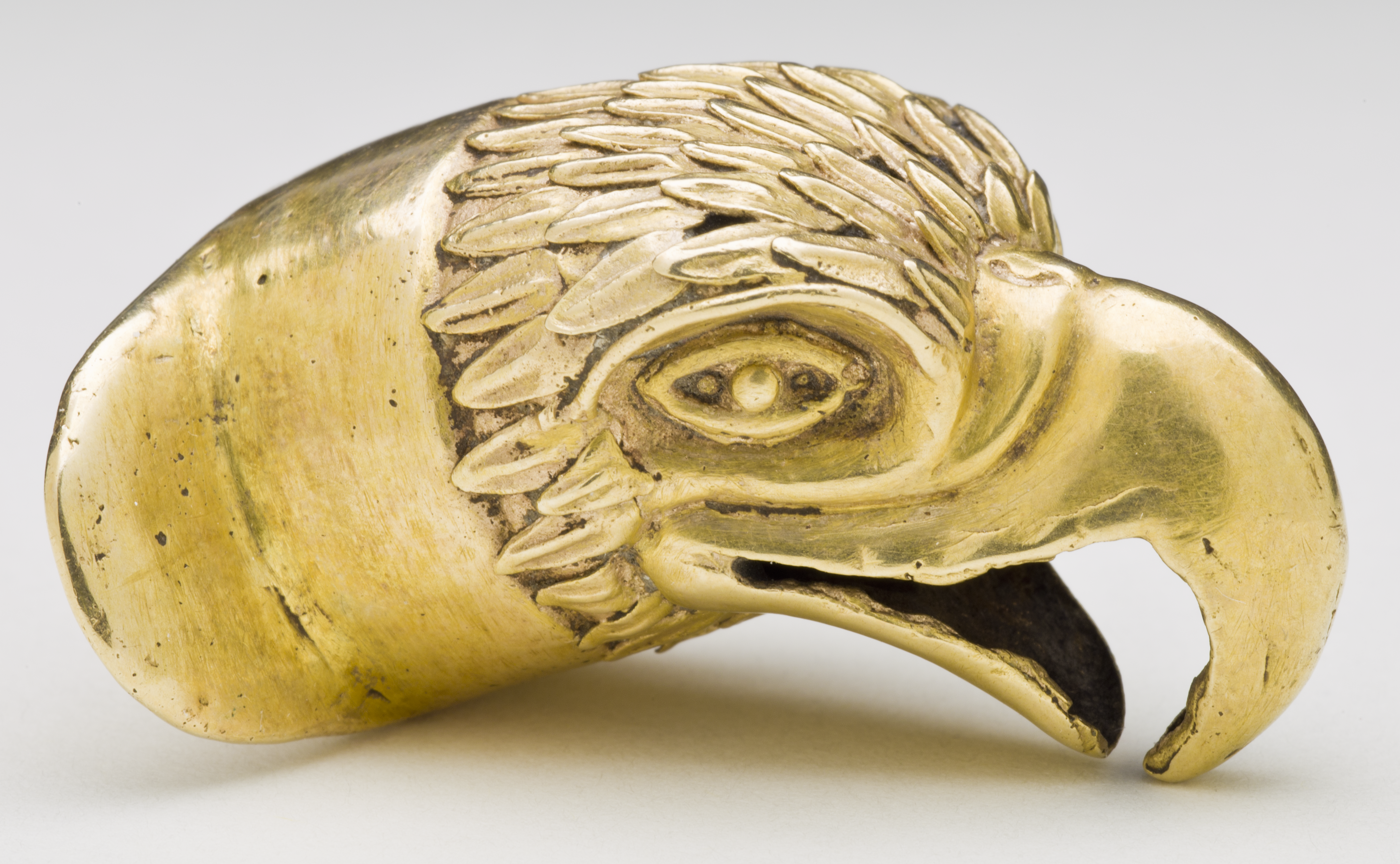
Gold eagle head (Los Angeles County Museum of Art)

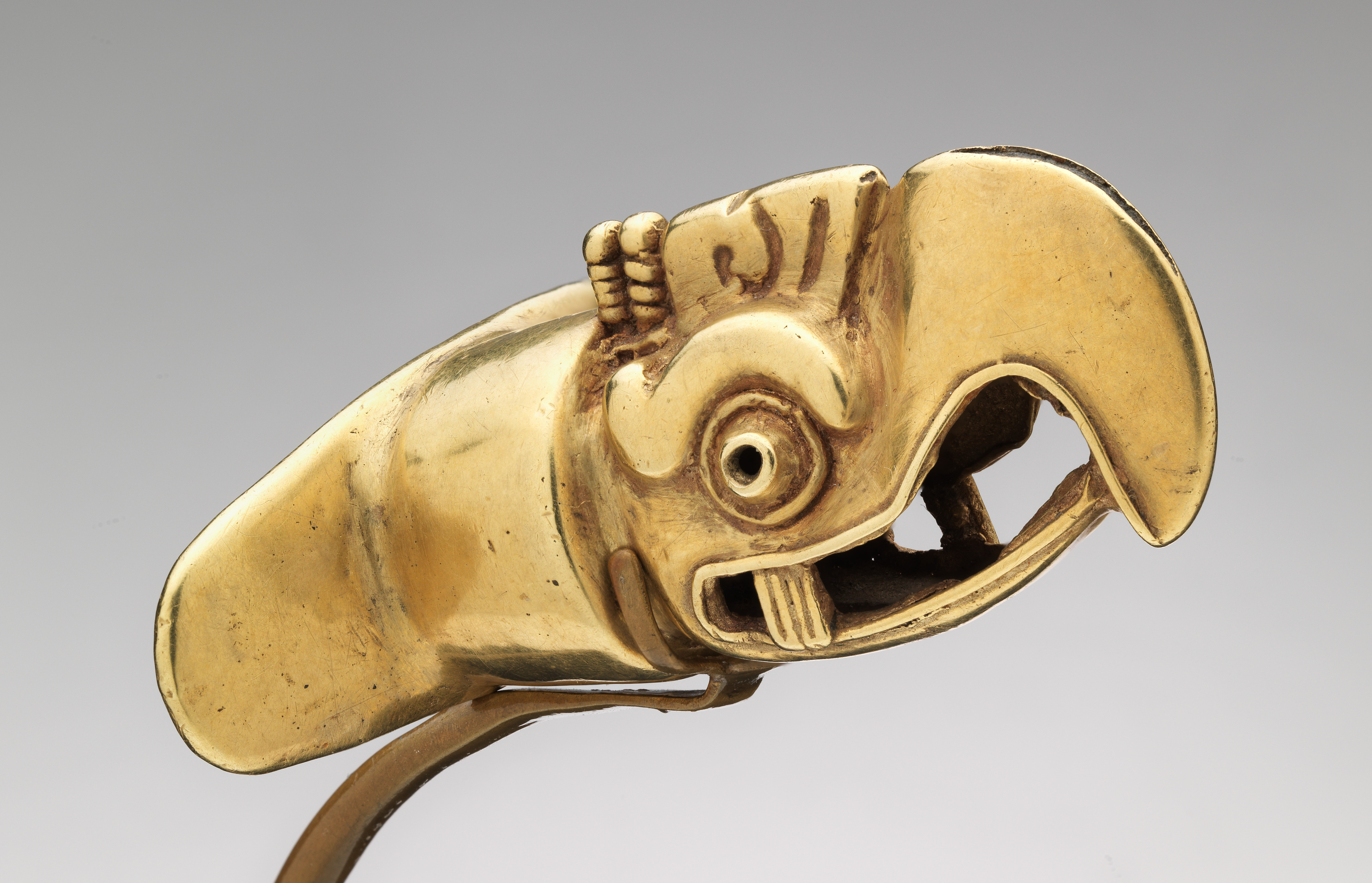
Gold eagle head (Met)

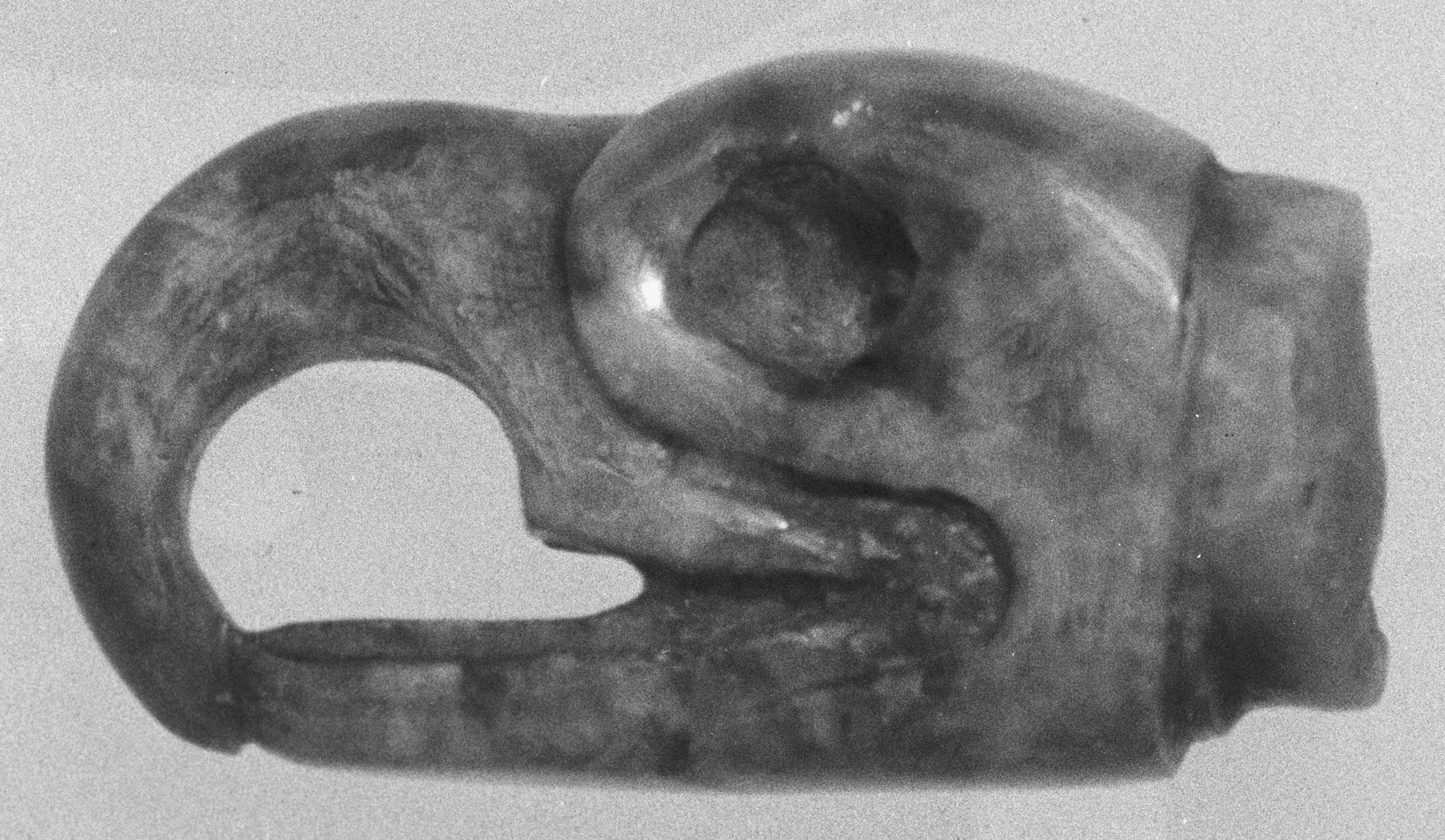
Jadeite eagle head (Met)

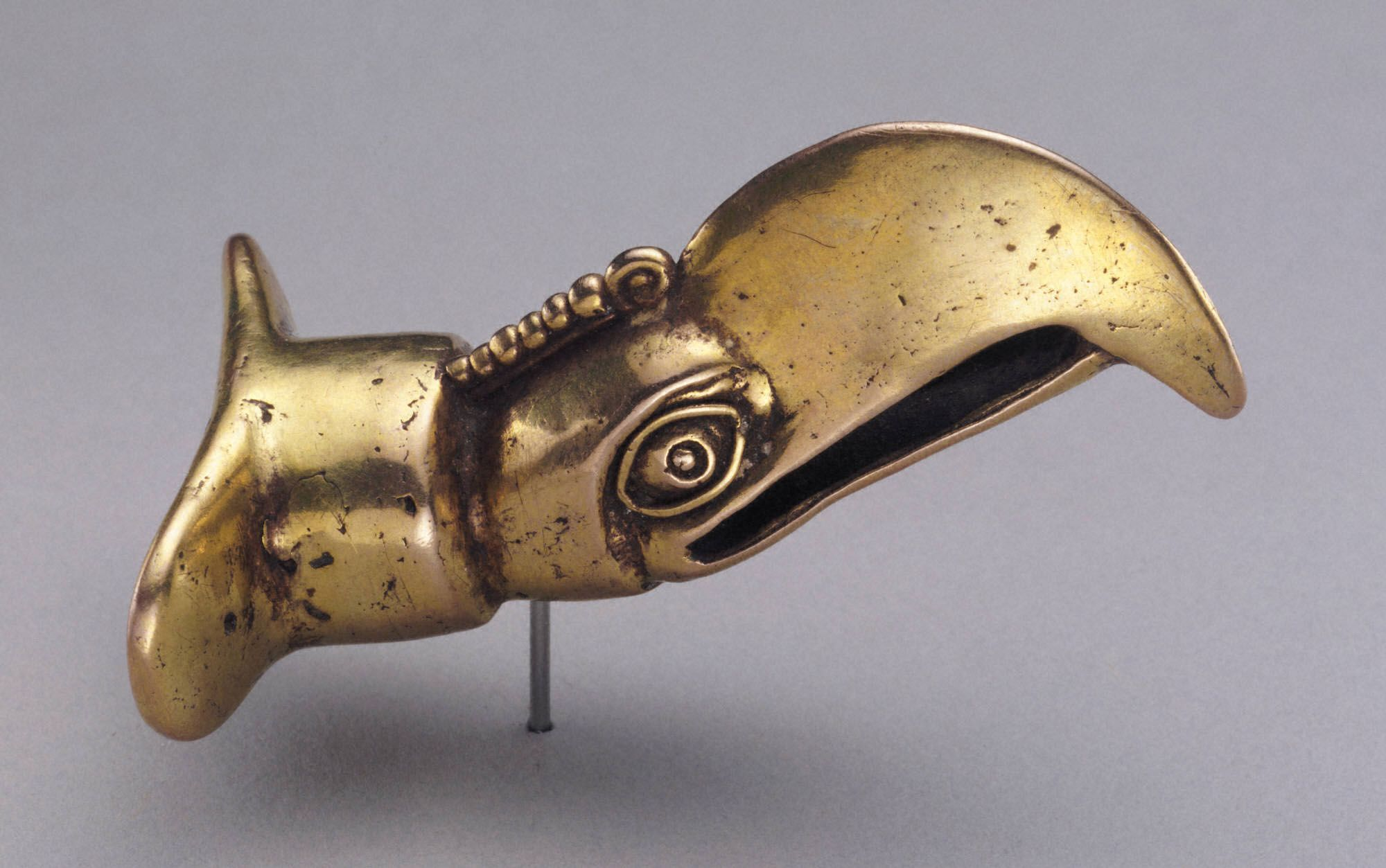
Gold curassow head (Princeton)

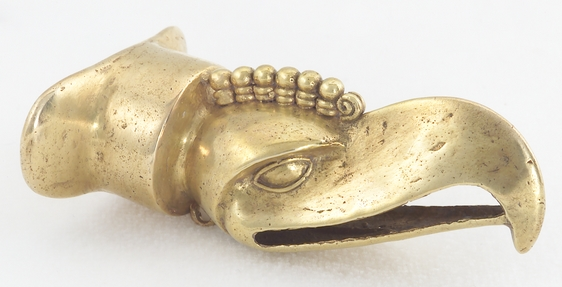
Gold bird's head (National Museum of the American Indian)

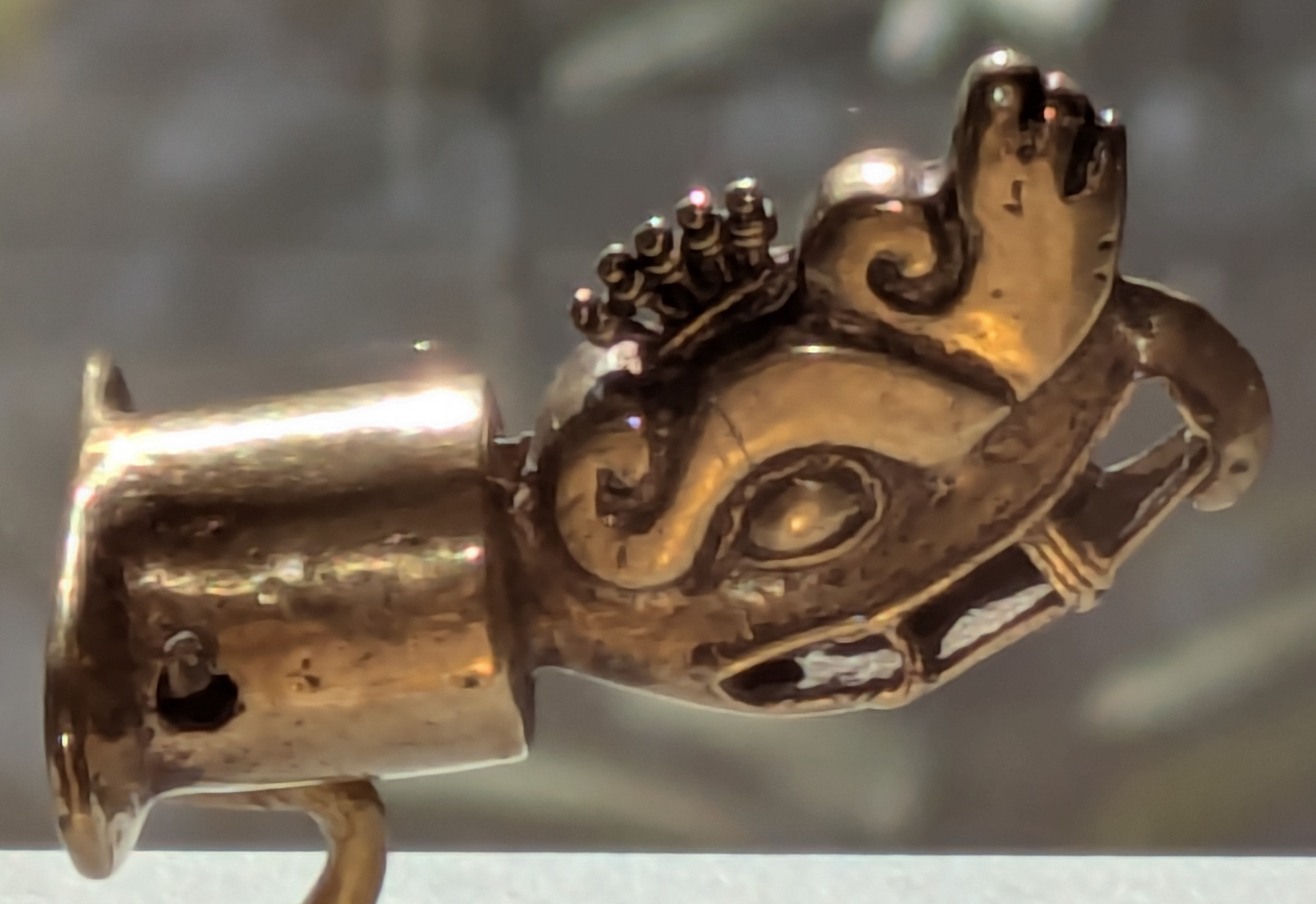
Gold bird/reptile/composite head (Dumbarton Oaks)

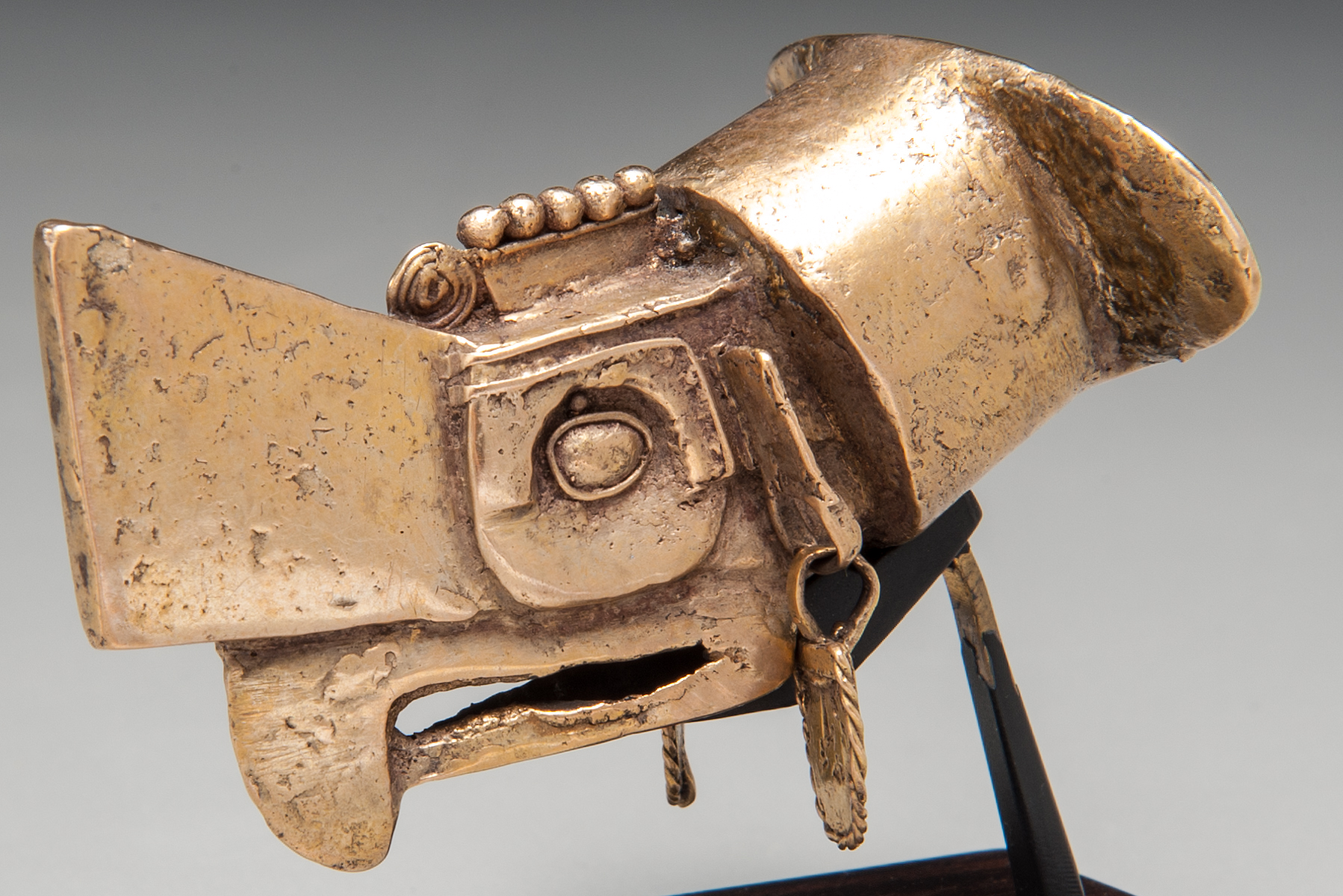
Gold bird-like head, possibly Ehecatl (Eskenazi)

== Description ==
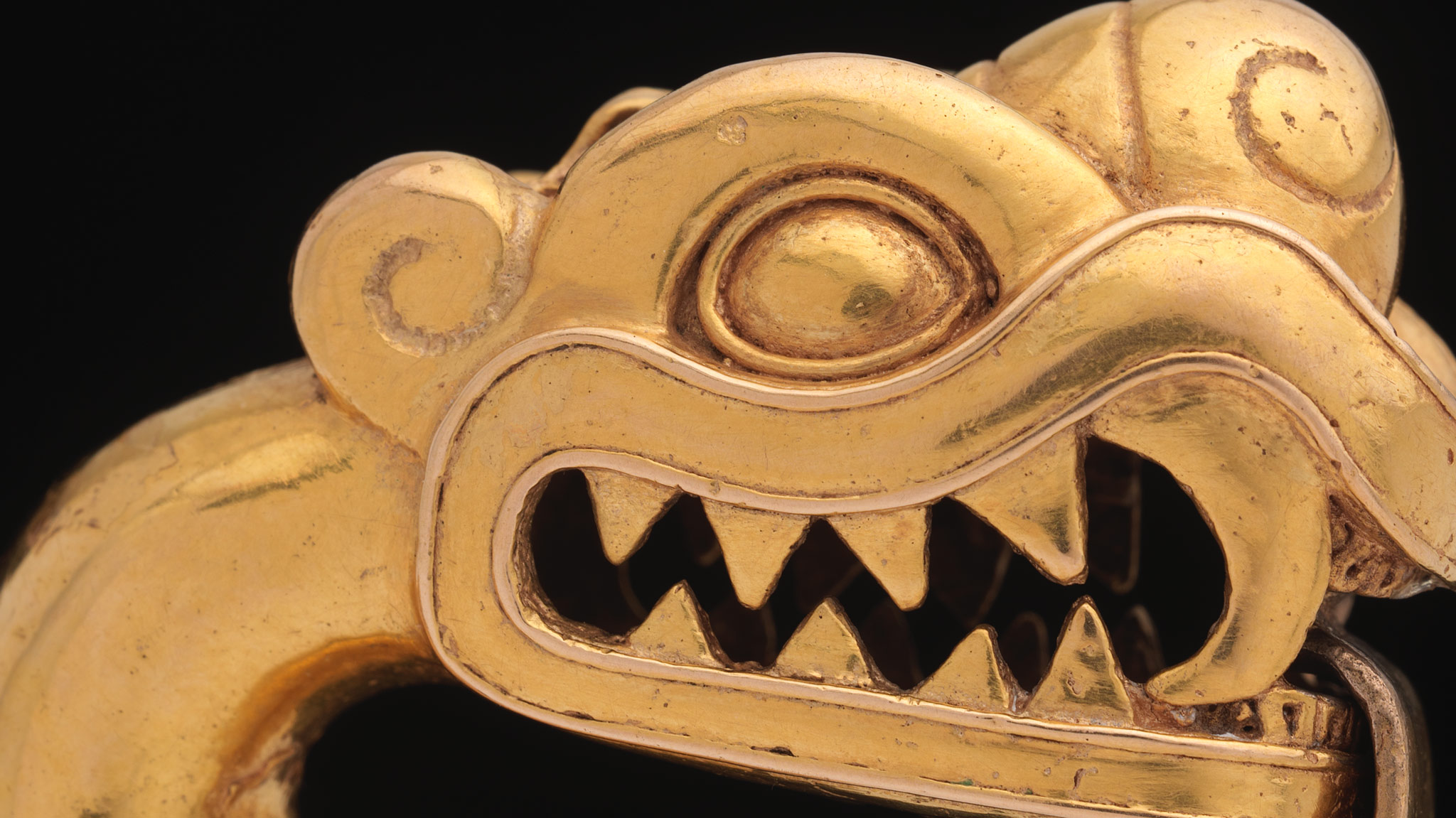
Head of the labret

The serpent labret with articulated tongue is 6.7 cm (2 5/8 in) high, 4.4 cm (1 3/4 in) wide, 6.7 cm (2 5/8 in) deep, and weighs 51 grams (1.81 oz). It is hollow, and made of an alloy of approximately 59.3 to 64.3% gold, 26.8 to 33.1% copper, and 7.5 to 8.8% silver.

The piece depicts a serpent poised to strike, with a curled eyebrow and snout, serrated teeth, two fangs and bifurcated tongue. The snout is large, with rounded nostrils, while the eyes are set under a prominent brow. The tongue was cast to hang freely, imbuing it with a liveliness as it is retracted or extended, or swings from side to side with the movement of its wearer. The underside of the lower jaw is covered in scales; atop the head sits a feathered and beaded headdress, represented in false filigree by a circle of ten spheres from which extend three loops. The spheres surround a small recess, perhaps once inlaid with stone. The serpent is attached to a cylindrical plug, decorated with a ring of small spheres and spirals, which has a wide and plain flange to hold the labret in place against the wearer's inner lip.

Art historians have described the labret as a "tour de force" of Aztec art, ingeniously crafted, and among the finest examples of Aztec goldwork known to survive. According to the curator Joanne Pillsbury of the Met, which owns the piece, the labret "opens a window into Aztec culture at the very highest level, a world almost entirely obliterated when Hernán Cortés arrived on the shores of Mexico in 1519".

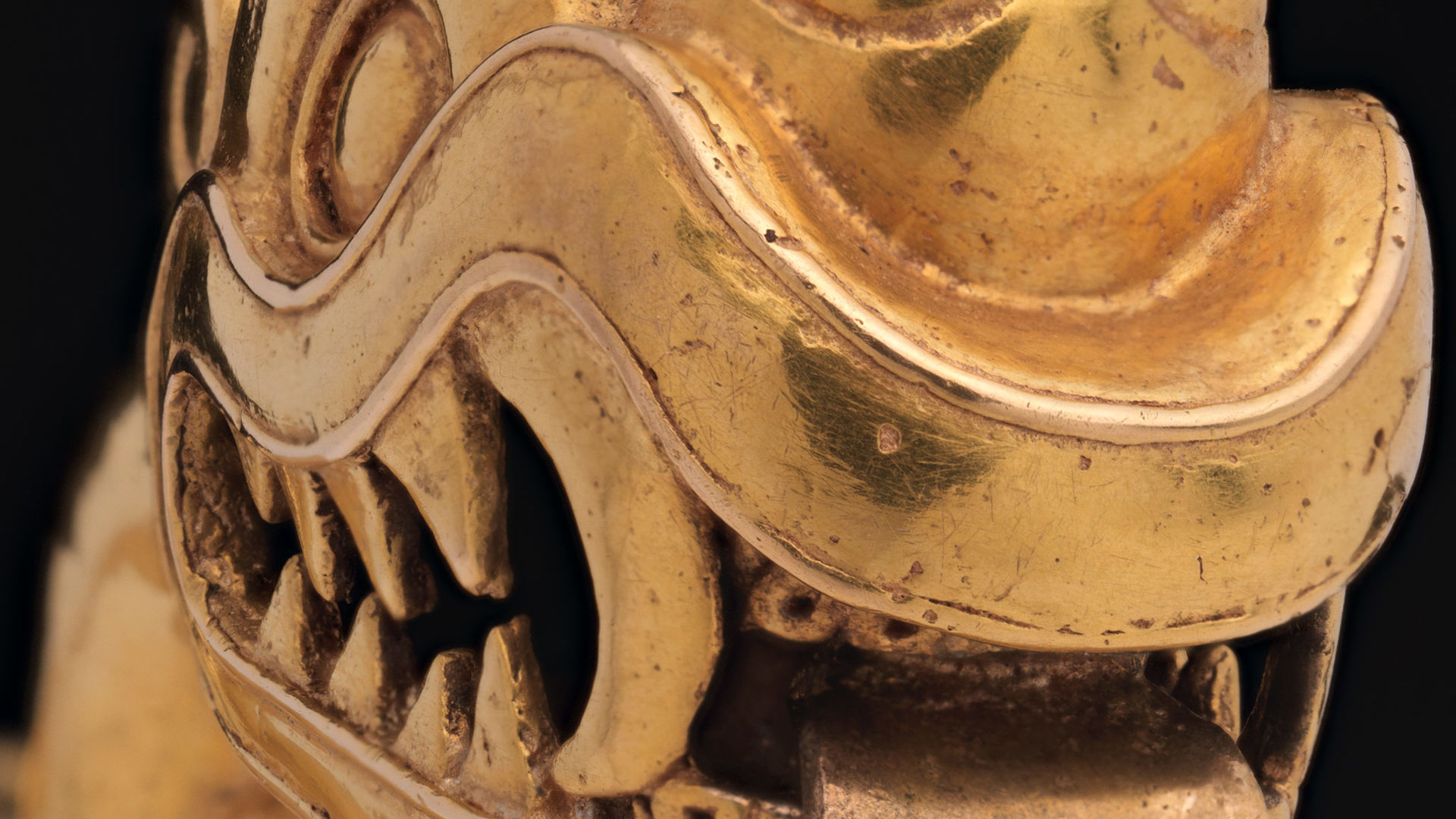
Close-up of mouth

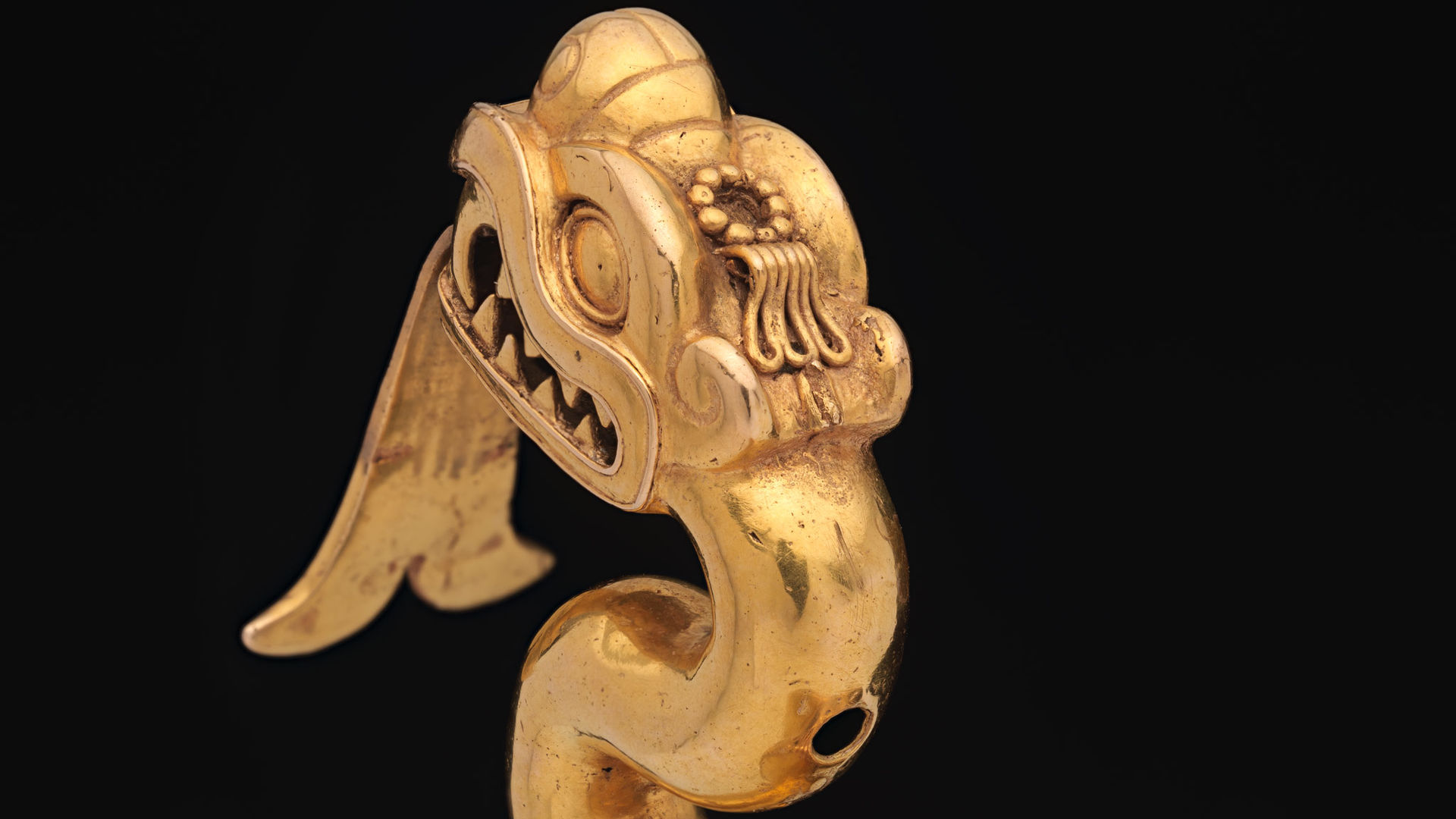
The headdress

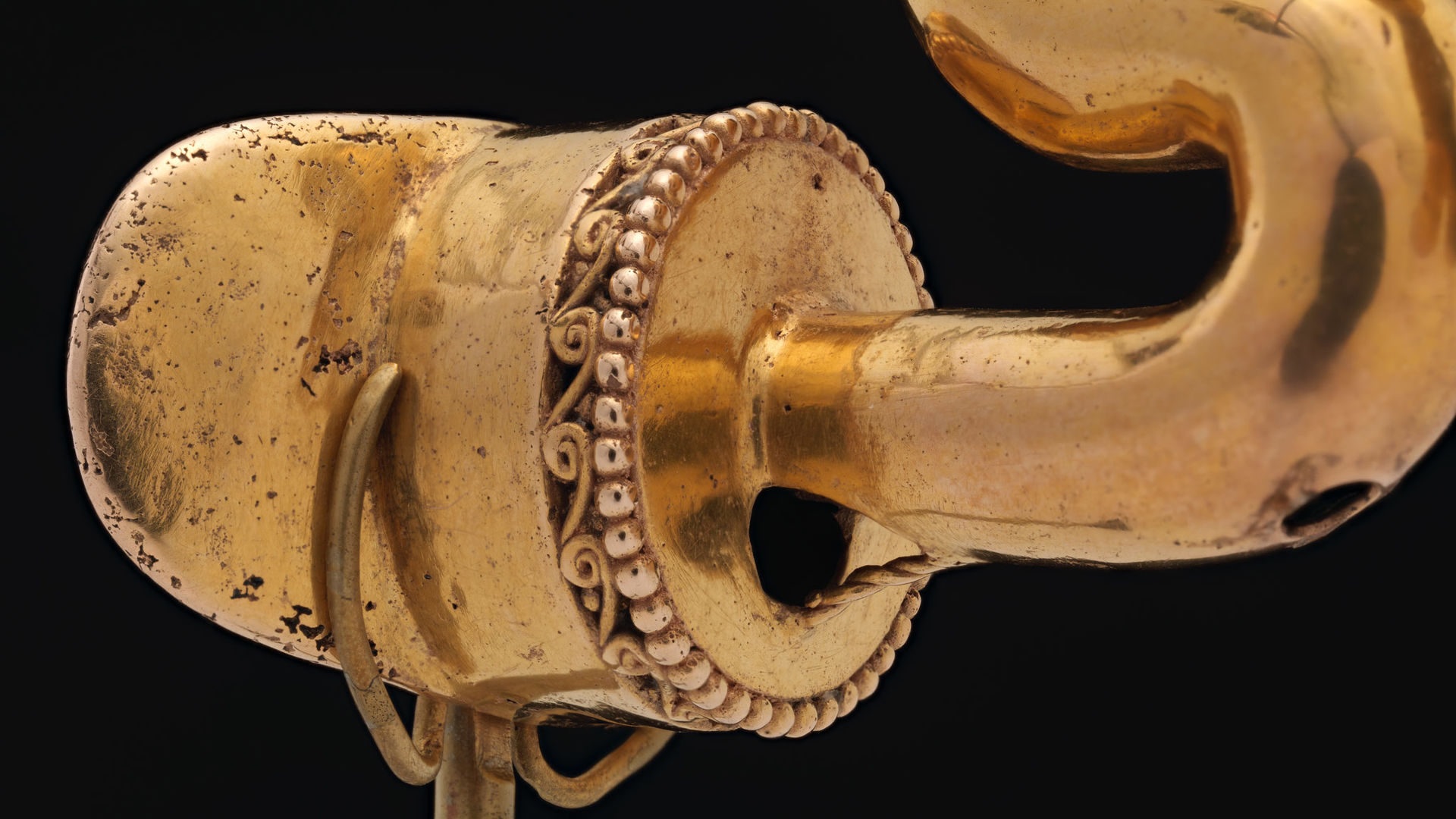
Decorations on the plug

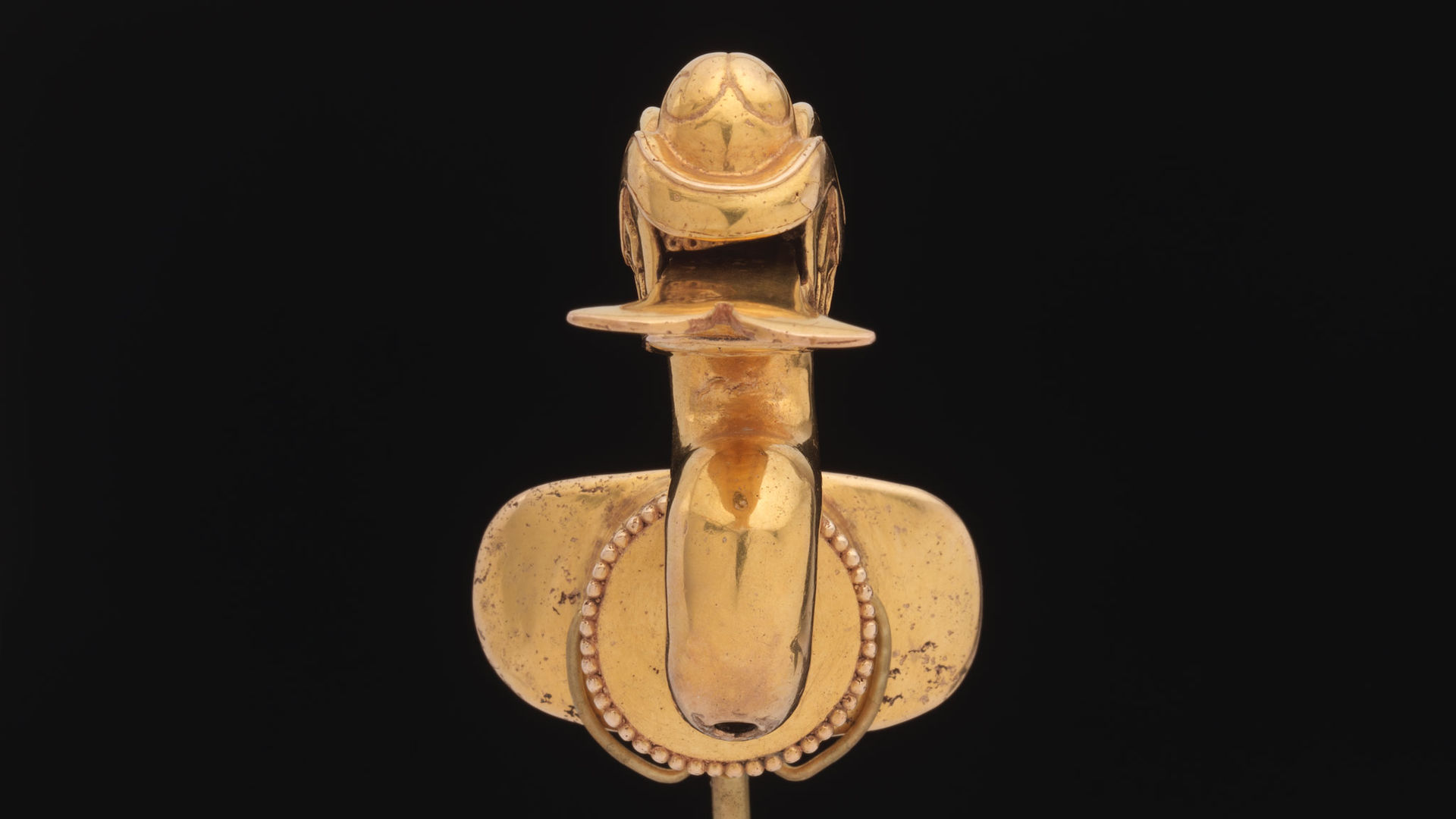
Front

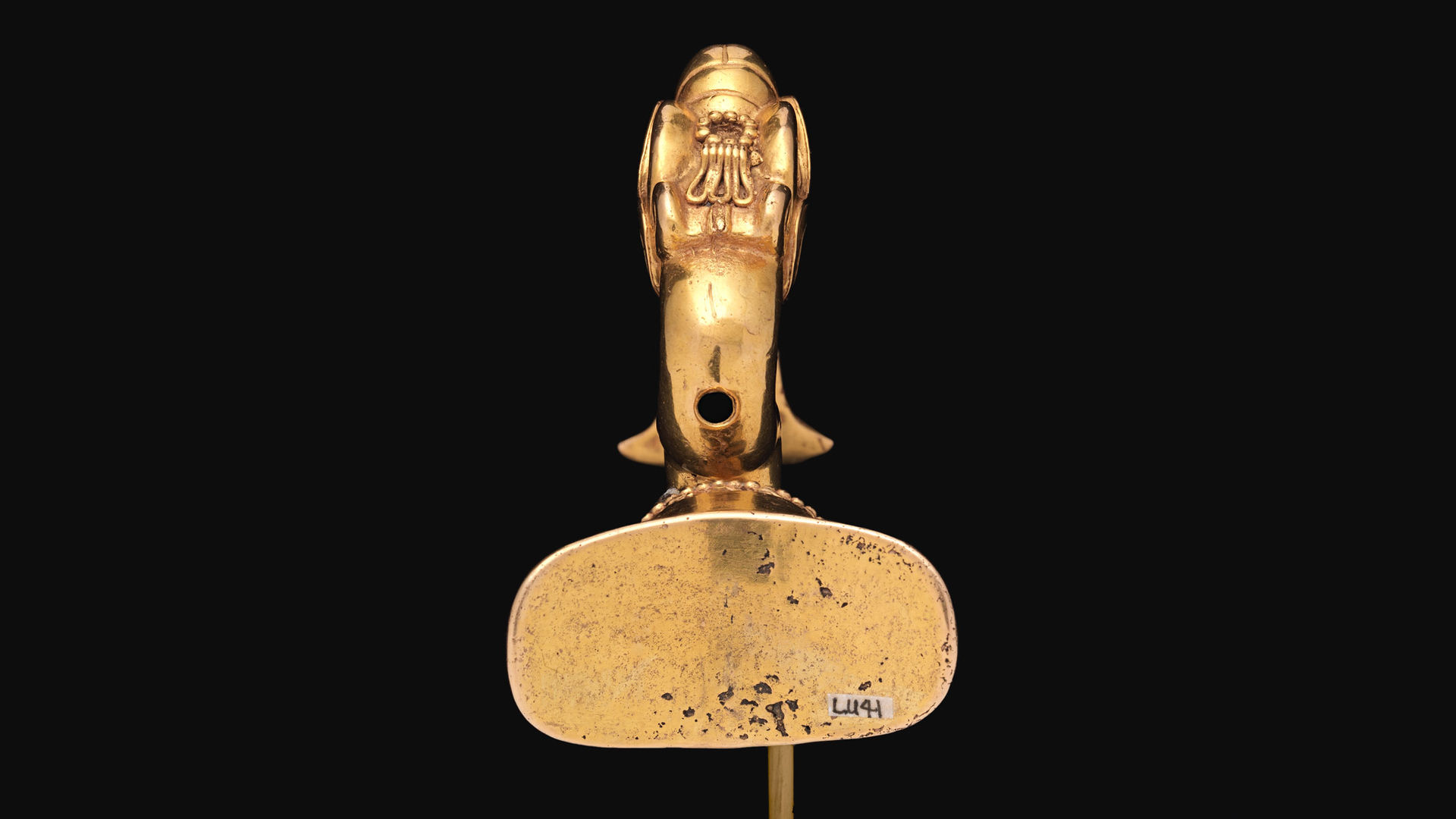
Back, showing base of plug and one of the three support holes from casting

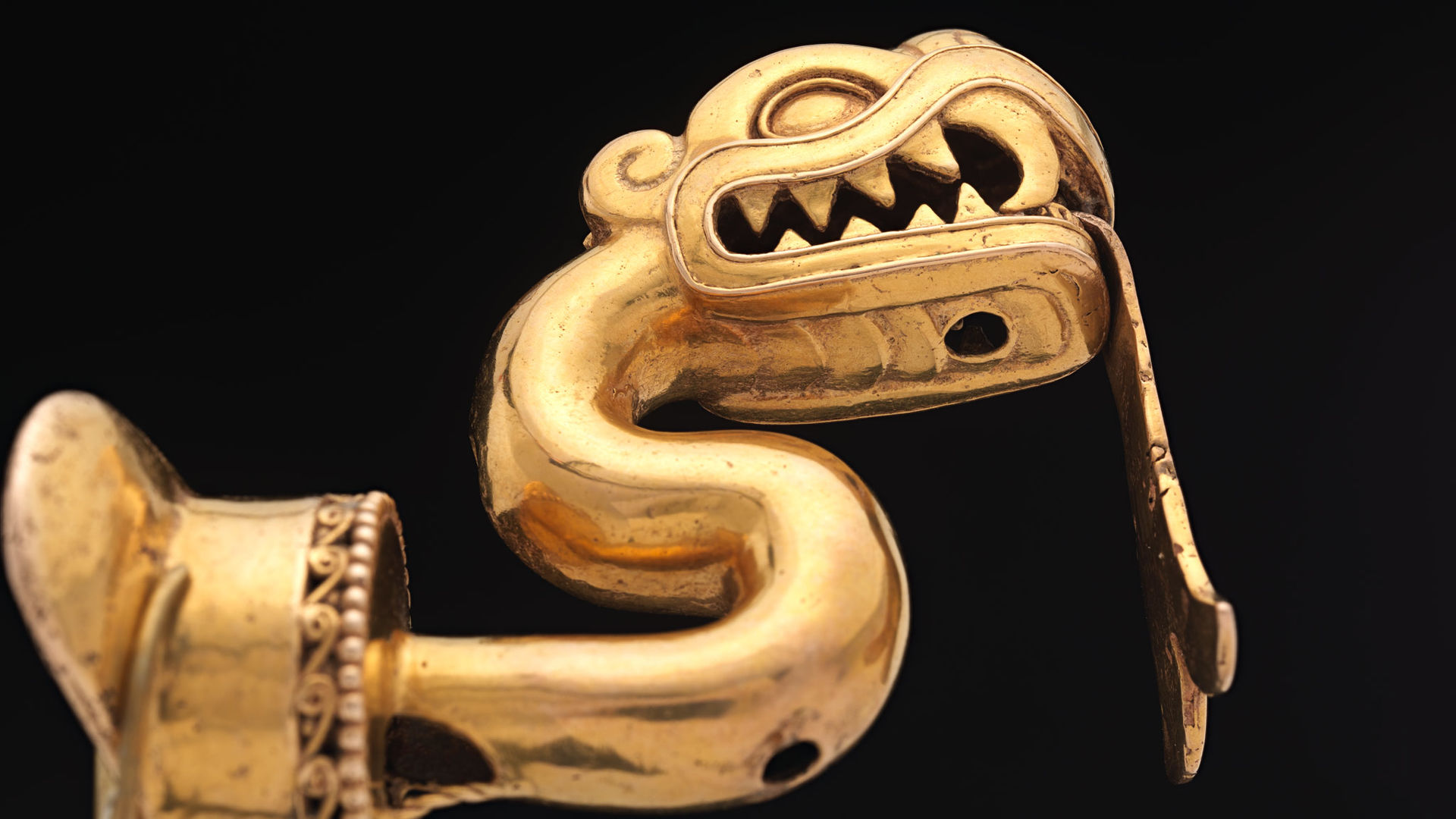
Underside, showing scales beneath the jaw and the other two support holes from casting

== Symbolism ==
Diagram showing how the labret would have been worn

Serpents were a longstanding motif of Mesoamerican art, appearing since at least the second millennium BC. They were particularly associated with rulers, in part because of the perception that snakes were able to transcend realms, from earth, to water, to sky. On the Met's labret, the use of wavy lines throughout, even more so than on the serpent owned by the National Museum of the American Indian, "gives not only a higher artistic touch to the piece," according to the art historian Pál Kelemen, "but removes it deeper into the world of fantasy". The labret's snout, curled eyebrows, and feathered headdress suggest that the piece may depict Xiuhcoatl, a mythological fire serpent wielded as a weapon by the sun god Huītzilōpōchtli.

The labret's material, gold, likely also carried symbolic weight. According to Sahagún, Aztecs considered gold to be Tōnatiuh icuitl, the 'excrement of the sun', (Note: Another term for gold was teocuitlatl: "often translated (not without a sense of humor) as 'holy shit'".) left behind as he traversed the underworld at night. Such labrets, especially when worn with other gold objects, likely evoked a connection with divinity, and implied a ruler's divine right to rule. To Pillsbury, the labret would have been terrifying to behold on ritual occasions and the battlefield. Given the size and weight, however, the archaeologist Michael D. Coe has suggested that it would have been worn on only particularly important occasions, while the art historian Dudley T. Easby Jr. has suggested that it may have instead been intended as a funerary or votive offering.

== Manufacture ==
Manufacturing process for the body of the labret

The labret is dated to 1300–1521, reflecting the period of time in which the Aztecs flourished, and could be the output of either Aztec or Mixtec makers. It was made via lost-wax casting in three pieces. (Note: For a description of lost-wax casting by Aztecs, see Bray 1968, pp. 131–132.) The tongue was cast first, filed and polished. Next, the head and neck piece were prepared for casting, with the finished tongue inserted into the core. The core was engraved, with the head and neck modelled in wax; comma-shaped marks in the metal show where the maker used a tool to press the wax into the core's grooves. The wax was likely then coated in a thin charcoal paste, known as teculatl. This became the mould's lining, and ensured the gold cast was sharp and accurate.

During the casting of the second piece the already-cast tongue appears to have shifted, displacing the wax from the top of the maxillary arch. Three holes 4 mm (0.16 in) in diameter—one behind the neck, one below the jaw, one below the body—show where a material such as wood or thorns was used to support the core. The second piece would then have been cleaned and polished. Finally, the second piece would have been fitted to the core of the flanged base, and this third piece cast.

== Provenance ==
The history of the labret before 1937 is unknown. By then it had been acquired by Heath McClung Steele, an executive at American Metal Company, who owned it until 1949. His children—Margaret Truman Fahnestock, Heath Warren Steele and David Truman Steele—next owned it until 1978, although throughout these periods it was on long-term loan to the American Museum of Natural History. The labret was sold at Sotheby's in New York on 22 November 1978 for US$101,000 (equivalent to $499,000 in 2025). From 1978 until 1981 it was owned by Jay C. Leff, a bank executive. From there it was sold by Judith Small Nash, a dealer and collector, then owned by Peter G. Wray, a major rancher, until 1 March 1985. It was next owned by Herbert L. Lucas until 2004.

The labret was in a private New York collection from 2004 until 2016. It was then purchased by the Met, using funds from the 2015 Benefit Fund and the Lila Acheson Wallace Gift, and given the accession number 2016.64. In its biennial report on new acquisitions, the Met noted the labret as one of its recent highlights, along with the Crown of the Andes—a gold crown encrusted with emeralds, made in Colombia in the seventeenth and eighteenth centuries to adorn a statue of the Virgin Mary.

== Exhibitions ==
The tongue alternating between positions

Even before its acquisition by the Met, the labret has been on display for the majority of the time that it has been known.

- 1937–1978: American Museum of Natural History, New York, long-term loan (with interruptions, including World War II and the exhibition below)
- 1940: Museum of Modern Art, New York, exhibition (Twenty Centuries of Mexican Art/Veinte Siglos de Arte Mexicano)
- 28 September 1983 – 8 January 1984: National Gallery of Art, Washington, D.C., exhibition (Art of Aztec Mexico: Treasures of Tenochtitlan)
- Beginning 1985 (likely through at least 1992, with gap during the exhibition below): Detroit Institute of Arts, long-term loan (T1985.198, from Herbert L. Lucas)
- 12 October 1991 – 12 January 1992: National Gallery of Art, exhibition (Circa 1492: Art in the Age of Exploration)
- 6 January 1993 – 1 November 2004: Metropolitan Museum of Art, long-term loan (L.1993.4, from Herbert L. Lucas)
- August 2013 – February 2016: Metropolitan Museum of Art, long-term loan (L.2013.72, from a private collection in New York)
- 16 September 2017 – 28 January 2018: J. Paul Getty Museum, exhibition (Golden Kingdoms: Luxury and Legacy in the Ancient Americas)
- 26 February 2018 – 28 May 2018: Metropolitan Museum of Art, exhibition (Golden Kingdoms: Luxury and Legacy in the Ancient Americas)
- 12 November 2018 – 24 February 2019: Metropolitan Museum of Art, exhibition (Jewelry: The Body Transformed)

== Bibliography ==
- Andrews, J. Richard (2003). Introduction to Classical Nahuatl (revised ed.). Norman, Oklahoma: University of Oklahoma Press. ISBN 0-8061-3452-6.
- Boone, Elizabeth Hill (1994). The Aztec World. Montréal: St. Remy Press. ISBN 0-89599-040-7. LCCN 94-9830.
- Bray, Warwick (1968). Everyday Life of the Aztecs. New York: Dorset Press. ISBN 0-88029-143-5.
- Dickey, Thomas; Muse, Vance & Wiencek, Henry (1982). The God-Kings of Mexico. Treasures of the World. Chicago: Stonehenge Press Inc. ISBN 0-86706-020-4. LCCN 81-84861.
- Easby, Dudley T. Jr. (1955). "Sahagún y los orfebres precolombinos de México" [Sahagún and the pre-Columbian goldsmiths of Mexico]. Anales del Instituto Nacional de Antropología e Historia [Annals of the National Institute of Anthropology and History] (in Spanish). IX (38). Instituto Nacional de Antropología e Historia: 85–117.
- Emmerich, André (1963). Art Before Columbus. Vol. I. New York: Simon & Schuster. LCCN 63-16027.
- Emmerich, André (1965). Sweat of the Sun and Tears of the Moon: Gold and Silver in Pre-Columbian Art. Vol. I. Seattle: University of Washington Press. LCCN 65-10817.
- Hajovsky, Patrick Thomas (2015). On the Lips of Others: Moteuczoma's Fame in Aztec Monuments and Rituals. Austin: University of Texas Press. doi:10.7560/766686. ISBN 978-0-292-76668-6. JSTOR 10.7560/766686. LCCN 2014023105.
- Holcomb, Melanie, ed. (2018). Jewelry: The Body Transformed. New York: The Metropolitan Museum of Art. ISBN 978-1-58839-650-1.
- Houston, Stephen D. & Cummins, Tom (2004). "Body, Presence, and Space in Andean and Mesoamerican Rulership". In Evans, Susan Toby & Pillsbury, Joanne (eds.). Palaces Of The Ancient New World: A Symposium at Dumbarton Oaks 10th and 11th October 1998. Washington, D.C.: Dumbarton Oaks Research Library and Collection. pp. 359–398. ISBN 0-88402-300-1. LCCN 84-22035.
- Importante Collection Américaine d'Art Précolombien: Cinquieme partie. Paris: Binoche et Giquello. 2021.
- King, Timothy B. (Fall 2015). "The Case for the Aztec Goldsmith". Ancient Mesoamerica. 26 (2). Cambridge University Press: 313–327. JSTOR 26301972.
- Klein, Cecelia F. (Fall 1993). "Teocuitlatl, "Divine Excrement": The Significance of "Holy Shit" in Ancient Mexico". Art Journal. 52 (3). New York: College Art Association: 20–27. doi:10.1080/00043249.1993.10791519. JSTOR 777364.
- Levenson, Jay A., ed. (1991). Circa 1492: Art in the Age of Exploration (PDF). New Haven: Yale University Press. ISBN 0-300-05167-0. LCCN 91-50590.
- López Luján, Leonardo & Ruvalcaba Sil, José Luis (January–June 2015). "El oro de Tenochtitlan: la colección arqueológica del Proyecto Templo Mayor" [Tenochtitlan’s Gold: the Archaeological Collection of the Great Temple Project] (PDF). Estudios de Cultura Náhuatl [Studies of Nahuatl Culture] (in Spanish). 49: 7–57.
- Meyer, Alfred, ed. (1970). Ancient Mexico and Central America. New York: The American Museum of Natural History.
- Mysteries of the Ancient Americas: The New World Before Columbus. Pleasantville, New York: The Reader's Digest Association, Inc. 1986. ISBN 0-89566-183-7. LCCN 84-15038.
- Nicholson, Henry B. & Keber, Eloise Quiñones (1983). Art of Aztec Mexico: Treasures of Tenochtitlan (PDF). Washington, D.C.: National Gallery of Art. ISBN 0-89468-070-6. LCCN 83-17217.
- Olko, Justyna (2014). Insignia of Rank in the Nahua World: From the Fifteenth to the Seventeenth Century. Boulder: University Press of Colorado. ISBN 978-1-60732-240-5. JSTOR j.ctt6wrrbn.
- Kelemen, Pál (1943a). Medieval American Art: A Survey in Two Volumes: Text. Vol. I. New York: The Macmillan Company.
- Kelemen, Pál (1943b). Medieval American Art: A Survey in Two Volumes: Illustrations. Vol. II. New York: The Macmillan Company.

- Republished as Kelemen, Pál (1956). Medieval American Art (one-volume ed.). New York: The Macmillan Company.

- Pillsbury, Joanne (Spring 2018). "Art on View: Golden Kingdoms: Luxury Arts in the Ancient Americas". Tribal Art. XXII (87). Arquennes, Belgium: Primedia S.P.R.L.: 78–89.
- Pillsbury, Joanne; Potts, Timothy & Richter, Kim N., eds. (2017). Golden Kingdoms: Luxury Arts in the Ancient Americas. Los Angeles: Getty Publications. ISBN 978-1-60606-548-8.
- "Recent Acquisitions: A Selection: 2014–2016" (PDF). The Metropolitan Museum of Art Bulletin. LXXIV (2). New York: Metropolitan Museum of Art. Fall 2016. ISSN 0026-1521. Archived (PDF) from the original on 20 March 2026.
- Roskamp, Hans (Spring 2010). "God of Metals: Tlatlauhqui Tezcatlipoca and the Sacred Symbolism of Metallurgy in Michoacan, West Mexico". Ancient Mesoamerica. 21 (1). Cambridge University Press: 69–78. JSTOR 26309088.
- Sale Number 4181: Fine Pre-Columbian Art. New York: Sotheby Parke Bernet Inc. 1978. OCLC 171475134.
- Twenty Centuries of Mexican Art / Veinte Siglos de Arte Mexicano. Mexico City: Instituto Nacional de Antropología e Historia. 1940.
- Vaillant, George C. (1944). The Aztecs of Mexico: Origin, Rise and Fall of the Aztec Nation. Hammondsworth: Penguin Books.

- Revised as Vaillant, George C. & Vaillant, Suzannah B. (1962). The Aztecs of Mexico: Origin, Rise and Fall of the Aztec Nation (2nd ed.). Hammondsworth: Penguin Books.
