= Linda Wertheimer =

American radio journalist (born 1943)

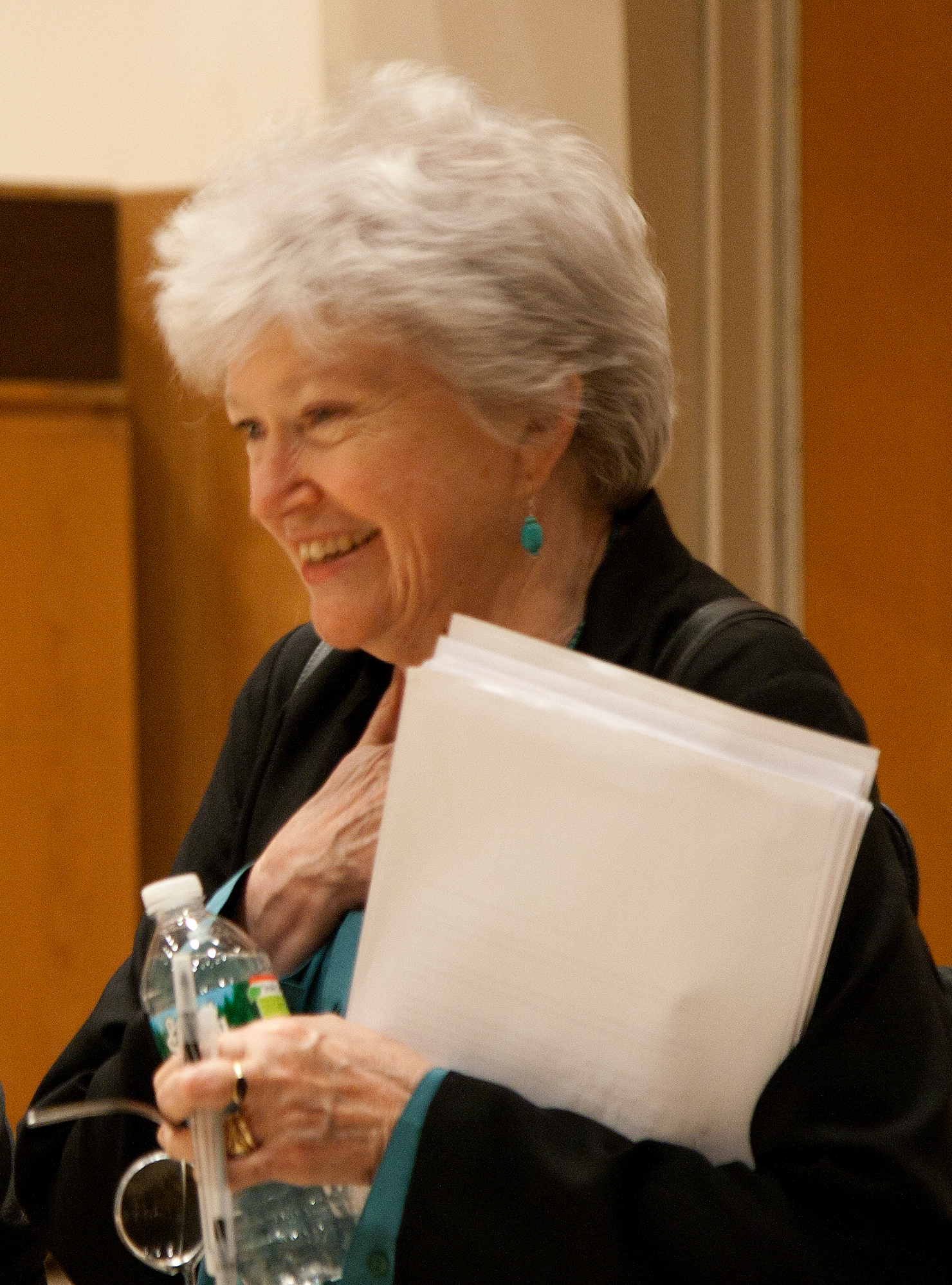
- Wertheimer at Wellesley College in 2012
- Born: Linda Cozby; March 19, 1943 (age 83); Carlsbad, New Mexico
- Education: Wellesley College
- Occupation: Radio journalist
- Spouse: Fred Wertheimer (m. 1969)

Linda Wertheimer (/ˈwɜːrθhaɪmər/; born March 19, 1943) is an American former radio journalist for NPR. She's considered one of NPR's "Founding Mothers" along with the late Susan Stamberg, Nina Totenberg and late Cokie Roberts.

== Background and education ==
Wertheimer was born Linda Cozby on March 19, 1943, in Carlsbad, New Mexico, the daughter of June and Miller Cozby, a grocery store operator and owner. She graduated from Wellesley College with the class of 1965.

== Career ==
After graduation, Wertheimer worked for the BBC and WCBS. She was reportedly told by an executive at NBC that she should be a researcher, rather than an on-air reporter. Wertheimer began her career with NPR as the first director of news magazine All Things Considered, hosted by Robert Conley, from its debut on May 3, 1971. She was appointed political correspondent by 1974, and in 1976 became the first woman to anchor NPR's coverage of a presidential nomination convention and of an election night. She continued in her role as a political correspondent through 1989, at which point she became a host of All Things Considered, a role in which she would continue for thirteen years. With Wertheimer hosting, the program's audience grew to record levels, from six million listeners in 1989 to nearly 10 million listeners by 2001, making it one of the top five shows in U.S. radio. In 2002, she left that role and became NPR's first senior national correspondent. As of 2008, Wertheimer has anchored ten presidential nomination conventions and twelve election nights. On February 6, 2024, she announced her retirement from NPR.

From 1981 to 1984, Wertheimer and Cokie Roberts joined Paul Duke in hosting The Lawmakers, a show on PBS about Congress.

== Awards ==
In 1979, Wertheimer won a DuPont-Columbia Award for excellence in broadcast journalism. She received the award for her live coverage of the debate in the United States Senate about the Torrijos-Carter Treaties, concerning the Panama Canal, in February 1978. Her coverage spanned a period of 37 days and marked the first time a live broadcast was transmitted from inside the Senate chamber. Washingtonian magazine named Wertheimer one of the top 50 journalists in Washington, while Vanity Fair called her one of the 200 most influential women in America.

In 1985, Wertheimer was awarded Wellesley's highest alumnae honor, the Distinguished Alumna Achievement Award. Wertheimer has received several other accolades, including awards from the Corporation for Public Broadcasting for her anchoring of The Iran-Contra Affair: A Special Report—a series of 41 half-hour programs on the Iran-Contra congressional hearings—from American Women in Radio and Television for her story Illegal Abortion, and from the American Legion for NPR's coverage of the Panama Canal Treaty debates.

== Bibliography ==
She is the author of the 1995 book, Listening to America: Twenty-Five Years in the Life of a Nation as Heard on NPR, (2nd ed.,1996) about recent American history as covered on NPR.

== Personal life ==
In 1969, she married Fred Wertheimer, a past president of Common Cause and incumbent CEO of Democracy 21. To avoid an apparent conflict of interest, Linda Wertheimer does not do stories on campaign finance reform, because her husband is a vocal advocate on that issue.
