= Suzannah =

Suzannah can be a feminine given name or a middle name. Notable people with the name include:

== Given name ==
- Suzannah Bianco (born 1973), American synchronized swimmer
- Suzannah Clark, Canadian and British musicologist
- Suzannah Clarke, British singer
- Suzannah Dunn, English author and educator
- Suzannah Fraser (born 1983), Australian water polo player
- Suzannah Ibsen, Norwegian wife
- Suzannah Lessard (1944–2026), American writer
- Suzannah Linton, academic
- Suzannah Lipscomb, British historian
- Suzannah Lishman, histopathologist
- Suzannah Mirghani, Qatar-based scriptwriter, researcher, and independent filmmaker
- Suzannah Olivier, author
- Suzannah Elizabeth Powell, American musician
- Suzannah Beck Vaillant, American archaeologist, translator, and activist
- Suzannah Weiss, American writer and sexologist

== Middle name ==
- Deeya Suzannah Bajaj (born 1994), Indian adventure sports athlete

== See also ==
- Susannah (given name)
- Susanna (given name)
