= Wessinger (surname) =

Wessinger is a surname. Notable people with the surname include:

- Catherine Wessinger (born 1952), American religion scholar
- Jim Wessinger (born 1955), American former baseball player and second baseman
- Todd Wessinger (born 1967), American convicted murderer on death row in Louisiana
