= Todd Wessinger =

American convicted killer on death row in Louisiana (born 1967)

Todd Kelvin Wessinger
- Wessinger's 2024 Mugshot
- Born: November 28, 1967 (age 58); Louisiana, U.S.
- Status: Incarcerated on death row in Louisiana
- Conviction: First-degree murder (x2)
- Penalty: Death (x2)

Details
- Victims: Stephanie Lynn Guzzardo, 27; David Breakwell, 46
- Date: November 19, 1995
- Location: Louisiana
- Imprisoned at: Louisiana State Penitentiary

Todd Kelvin Wessinger (born November 28, 1967) is an American convicted murderer sentenced to death for the murders of two restaurant employees in Louisiana during an armed robbery. On November 19, 1995, Wessinger shot three people in a mass shooting, killing David Breakwell and Stephanie Guzzardo, at a Baton Rouge restaurant. Wessinger was found guilty in 1997 of two counts of first-degree murder and sentenced to death, and he is imprisoned on death row at the Louisiana State Penitentiary. His execution has yet to be scheduled.

== Baton Rouge restaurant shootings ==
On November 19, 1995, 27-year-old Todd Kelvin Wessinger, who previously worked as a dishwasher, committed a mass shooting at a restaurant where he had previously worked, resulting in the deaths of two of his former colleagues.

On the day in question, Wessinger entered the restaurant with a .380 semi-automatic pistol after arriving at the restaurant on a bicycle. Wessinger and the bartender, Mike Armentor, greeted each other and immediately after entering the restaurant, Wessinger fired two shots at Armentor from the back and Armentor collapsed on the ground with severe abdominal injuries. Afterwards, Wessinger held the dishwasher, Alvin Ricks, at gunpoint and wanted to shoot him in the head, but the gun jammed and failed to discharge, and Ricks quickly escaped the restaurant, with Wessinger misfiring the gun while trying to aim for Ricks's leg. Ricks and Willie Grigsby, another employee, ran across the street after their escape to call the police, with Ricks informing Girgsby that he identified the shooter.

Back at the restaurant, Wessinger continued his shooting spree. He pointed his gun at the restaurant manager, Stephanie Guzzardo, who was about to call the police. Guzzardo pleaded for her life but Wessinger shot and killed the 27-year-old manager. After he removed approximately $7000 from the office, Wessinger found the 46-year-old cook David Breakwell hiding inside the cooler. Despite Breakwell's pleas for mercy, he was shot by Wessinger.

After murdering Guzzardo and shooting Breakwell and Armentor, Wessinger fled the restaurant on his bicycle. Armentor and Breakwell were found by paramedics responding to the scene, but Breakwell died on the way to the hospital. Despite the severity of his wounds, Armentor survived with timely medical intervention.

== Trial and sentencing ==
On November 28, 1995, nine days after he killed Guzzardo and Breakwell, Wessinger was arrested in Garland, Texas, and extradited back to Louisiana, where he was charged with two counts of first-degree murder in the Baton Rouge restaurant shootings, and if convicted of first-degree murder, Wessinger faced the death penalty.

On June 24, 1997, after a trial lasting two days, an East Baton Rouge Parish jury found Wessinger guilty of first-degree murder on both counts, and his sentencing hearing began the next day.

On June 26, 1997, the jury returned with their verdict on sentence, unanimously recommending death sentences for each of the two murder charges proferred against Wessinger. On September 17, 1997, Wessinger was formally sentenced to death by the trial judge in accordance with the jury's recommendation.

== Appeals ==
On May 28, 1999, the Louisiana Supreme Court dismissed Wessinger's appeal against his death sentence and murder conviction.

On September 4, 2003, District Judge Richard Anderson rejected Wessinger's request for a new trial.

Nine years later, Wessinger was issued a death warrant, and his execution date was set as May 9, 2012. On April 14, 2012, Wessinger appealed for a new trial in his case. Two weeks after Wessinger filed the appeal, on April 25, 2012, a stay of execution was granted to Wessinger while pending his appeal for a new trial. A hearing was granted by a federal judge in May 2012.

On July 29, 2015, U.S. District Judge James Joseph Brady ordered a new sentencing hearing for Wessinger, whose death sentence was vacated but with his murder conviction upheld. Brady ruled that Wessinger's trial counsel was deficient in their conduct and this violated Wessinger's constitutional rights. In response to the reprieve, Guzzardo's father called the ruling a "stab in the back" and accused Brady of having no compassion for the victims' families. Prior to the ruling, Guzzardo's father affirmed that he would not want Wessinger to be given life imprisonment for murdering his daughter and sought to have the death penalty carried out in Wessinger's case.

In July 2016, Wessinger and another condemned killer, Shedran Williams (who killed a policeman in 2004), applied to join a 2012 federal lawsuit filed by Jessie Hoffman Jr. and Christopher Sepulvado against the constitutionality of the state's lethal injection protocols. The lawsuit itself was concluded in 2022.

On July 20, 2017, the 5th U.S. Circuit Court of Appeals revived Wessinger's death sentence.

On January 8, 2018, the U.S. Supreme Court rejected Wessinger's appeal and confirmed his death sentence for the Baton Rouge restaurant shooting.

Another appeal was filed to the U.S. Supreme Court. Wessinger's lawyers argued in this appeal that the jury in Wessinger's original trial did not hear mitigating evidence from his trial counsel, which included the child abuse and brain damage caused by a stroke suffered by Wessinger during his childhood, factors that would have allowed him to be spared the death penalty. The petition was likewise rejected by a vote of 8–1 on March 5, 2018. Guzzardo's father applauded the decision by stating, "It’s one step closer to justice."

On December 20, 2022, Wessinger's petition for habeas relief was granted by U.S. District Judge John W. deGravelles, who ordered Wessinger to undergo a new sentencing trial, and state prosecutors had since appealed the ruling.

In June 2025, deGravelles again ordered a new re-sentencing trial, but the prosecution appealed the decision.

On March 31, 2026, the 5th Circuit Court of Appeals heard the prosecution's appeal to overturn deGravelles's ruling.

On August 18, 2026, the 5th Circuit Court of Appeals reversed the lower court's decision and denied Wessinger's request to avoid his execution, which was now set to move forward.

On September 9, 2026, Wessinger filed a lawsuit against the state, seeking to bar them from executing him by nitrogen hypoxia, which was previously deployed by the state to execute Jessie Hoffman Jr. on March 18, 2025, for the murder of Molly Elliot.

On October 5, 2026, District Attorney Hillar Moore announced his intention to seek a new death warrant to schedule Wessinger's execution date, after the 5th Circuit Court of Appeals declined to rehear Wessinger's case earlier that same week.

On October 13, 2026, U.S. District Judge John deGravelles dismissed Wessinger's appeal against his death sentence.

On October 19, 2026, in response to Wessinger's lawsuit to prevent his execution by nitrogen hypoxia, Louisiana state officials asked for the lawsuit to be rejected and stated that they would offer Wessinger an alternative choice to be put to death by lethal injection, specifically using pentobarbital by itself, rather than the state's double-drug lethal injection protocol (midazolam and hydromorphone), which Wessinger's lawyers similarly opposed in the same lawsuit.

On October 29, 2026, DOC Secretary Gary Wescott announced that the state had secured a supply of pentobarbital as preparation for the potential execution of Wessinger.

== 2023 clemency petition ==
In 2023, as Louisiana Governor John Bel Edwards approached the end of his term, he publicly announced his opposition to the death penalty and his support for its abolition in the state. Despite this, on May 24, 2023, the Louisiana legislature voted down a bill that aimed to abolish capital punishment. Stephanie Guzzardo's father testified in opposition to the abolition of capital punishment, stating that he supported the execution of Wessinger and emotionally recounted during a legislature hearing about how his daughter was gunned down despite her plea for mercy, and was offended by those who cited the expensive costs of death penalty cases, stating that this was like an insult to "put a price tag" on his daughter's life.

A month later, in June 2023, 56 out of the 57 death row inmates in the state filed clemency petitions in hopes of having their death sentences commuted to life imprisonment by Edwards before his term ended. Wessinger was one of those 56 prisoners that petitioned for clemency, and their applications were referred to the Louisiana Board of Pardons and the Committee on Parole. In response to Wessinger's clemency petition, Guzzardo's father expressed that he wanted Wessinger to be executed for murdering his daughter, and he promised to oppose the commutation of Wessinger's death sentence, and was critical of Wessinger's attempts to escape his execution.

In July 2023, the Board rejected all 56 petitions, citing that the inmates were ineligible because their filings came too soon after recent judicial rulings on their appeals. According to the rules, clemency petitions could only be filed at least one year after the final appeal decision. In October 2023, the Board also denied further clemency requests from five death row inmates, including the state's only female condemned prisoner Antoinette Frank.

Eventually, the Louisiana Board of Pardons and Parole decided to conduct a clemency hearing for Wessinger. Wessinger's lawyers argued that their client suffered from mental deficiencies induced by a pediatric stroke, and this information was not presented before the jury.

On November 27, 2023, Wessinger was denied clemency.

== See also ==
- Capital punishment in Louisiana
- List of death row inmates in the United States § Louisiana
- List of people scheduled to be executed in the United States
