= DeGravelles =

deGravelles may refer to:

- Charles deGravelles (1913–2008), American oil tycoon and political activist, organizer, and candidate
- Virginia deGravelles (1915–2017), American political activist and organizer, wife of Charles deGravelles
- John W. deGravelles (born 1951), American federal district court judge, son of Charles and Virginia deGravelles.
