= Anne McBride =

Anne McBride may refer to:

- Ann McBride Norton (1944–2020), American activist and non-profit executive
- Anne C. McBride, former leader of the Social Credit Party of Ontario
