= Nels C. Nelson =

Danish-American archaeologist (1875–1964)

Nels C. Nelson (second from right), a long-term employee of the American Museum of Natural History, was photographed in a museum exhibit with other AMNH staffers, including (L-R) George Vaillant, Harry L. Shapiro, Nelson, and Clark Wissler. Margaret Bourke-White photo, 1937.

Nels Christian Nelson (April 9, 1875 – March 5, 1964) was a Danish-American archaeologist.

== Biography ==
Nelson was born near Fredericia, in the Fredericia municipality in the eastern part of Jutland, Denmark. He was the eldest child in a poor family. He was sent to work on an uncle's farm in Minnesota in 1892. There he started first grade at age 17, graduating from high school in 1901. He rode a cattle car to California, saved money from odd jobs, and entered Stanford University in about 1903. He transferred to the University of California, Berkeley in 1905. Nelson earned his Bachelor of Letters in 1907, and an M.L. in 1908.

Nelson became interested in anthropology, and went to work for John C. Merriam surveying middens around San Francisco Bay and on the California coast. Nelson later estimated he walked 3,000 miles for the survey. He also worked for Alfred Kroeber, conducting fieldwork throughout California. In 1911, Nelson was hired by Clark Wissler, Curator of Anthropology at the American Museum of Natural History, to conduct archaeological work in the upper Rio Grande valley of New Mexico. This project, funded by philanthropist Archer Milton Huntington, was intended to develop archaeological methods to establish the chronology of historic and indigenous sites. Nelson's new wife, Ethelyn Hobbs Nelson, would be his paid field assistant. In 1912 they began work in New Mexico's Galisteo Basin, south of Santa Fe.

Nelson pioneered the technique of stratigraphic excavation in America. During his work in the Galisteo Basin, he dug a series of 1-foot levels in trash mounds at archeological sites, classified all the pot shards he found into seven types, and calculated their frequencies by levels. These resembled sections of normal distribution curves, and demonstrated that statistical analysis of data from arbitrary levels could reveal chronological change just as could data from physically distinct strata. This technique, refined by Alfred V. Kidder at Pecos, continues to be used to the present day.

The Daxi culture, a Neolithic culture, located in the Qutang Gorge around Wushan, Chongqing, in China was discovered by Nels C. Nelson in the 1920s. The Nelsons joined Roy Chapman Andrews on his third expedition to Mongolia in 1925.

Nelson served as president of the American Anthropological Association, president of the Society for American Archaeology, president of the American Ethnological Society, and vice president of the American Association for the Advancement of Science. Nelson served in a number of curatorial positions at American Museum of Natural History (AMNH), ultimately as Curator of Prehistoric Archeology. He retired from AMNH in 1943, and died in 1964 in New York City, at age 89.

== Notable publications ==
- "Shellmounds of the San Francisco Bay Region" in American Archaeology and Ethnology. vol. 7, no. 4. (1909).
- "Pueblo ruins of the Galisteo basin, New Mexico." Anthropological papers of the American museum of Natural History. Vol. XV, pt. I. (1914)
- "Chronology of the Tano Ruins, New Mexico." American Anthropologist, vol. 18, No. 2, pp. 159–180. (1916)
- "Flint Working By Ishi." Anthropological Essays Presented to William Henry Holmes. Washington D.C., 1916: pp. 397–402.
- "Contributions to the Archaeology of Mammoth Cave and Vicinity, Kentucky." Anthropological papers of the American Museum of Natural History. vol. 22, pt. 1. (1917)
- The New Conquest of Central Asia; A Narrative of the Explorations of the Central Asiatic Expeditions in Mongolia and China, 1921–1930 co-authored with Roy Chapman Andrews, Walter W. Granger and Clifford H. Pope. New York: The American Museum of Natural History. 1932.
- The antiquity of man in America in the light of archaeology (University of Toronto Press. 1933)
- "Notes on the Santa Barbara culture." Essays in anthropology in honor of Alfred Louis Kroeber pp. 199–209. Univ. of California Press. 1936.
- South African rock pictures (American Museum of Natural History. 1937)
