= Mary McBride (musician) =

American pop rock singer

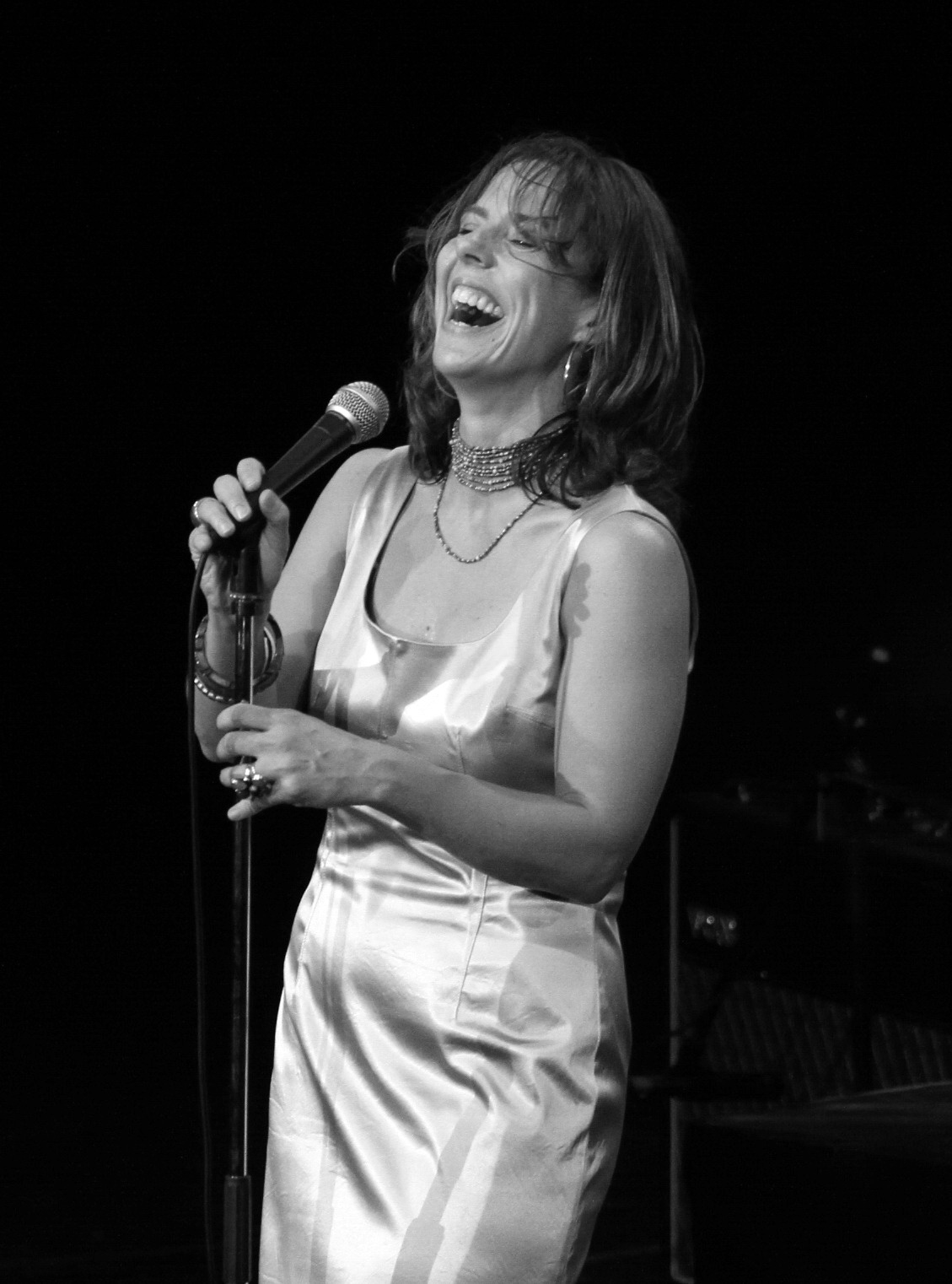

Mary McBride is an American pop rock singer.

== Career ==
McBride is the daughter of Common Cause president Ann McBride Norton. She was born in Louisiana and grew up in Washington, D.C. She became interested in music from a young age, and after moving to New York City began performing in miscellaneous public places and venues in New York City, including Mercury Lounge and the Bowery Ballroom. She began recording her debut album, Everything Seemed Alright, on September 11, 2001, the day of the September 11 attacks. McBride has said she wanted to convey the "apocalyptic vibe" of the time through the album's songs. The album was released in 2002 on Bogan Records.

In 2005, her song "No One's Gonna Love You Like Me" appeared in Brokeback Mountain and on the accompanying soundtrack. In 2011, she and her band went on the "Home Tour", which began at the Louisiana State Penitentiary and subsequently stopped at multiple other unusual locations, like a halfway house and a Veterans Affairs hospital.

In 2015, after being profiled in the New York Times, MSNBC's Morning Joe profiled McBride's diplomacy and humanitarian work. She discussed her "Home Tour" live music program and performed her original song "Home" on the morning show

== Personal life ==
McBride met Leslie Klotz at a Christmas party in 2005, and they had a commitment ceremony with one another in Montego Bay, Jamaica, in 2007. The couple split in 2012.

== Discography ==
- Everything Seemed Alright (Bogan, 2002)
- By Any Other Name (Reality Entertainment, 2004)
- Every Day Is a Holiday (Bogan, 2009)
