= El Arbolillo =

Archaeological site in Mexico

- Interactive map of El Arbolillo
- 19°32′20″N 99°11′35″W
- Cultures: Preclassical Mesoamerican
- Location: Tlalnepantla, State of Mexico; Mexico

History
- Built: Around 900 BCE.

El Arbolillo is a Mesoamerican archaeological site located in the territory of the current municipality of Tlalnepantla de Baz, in the State of Mexico. It contains the remains of an ancient farming village that developed during the preclassical mesoamerican period, in the west shores of the Texcoco Lake. According to available data, the earliest occupation of this site could be dated to 900 BCE.

Objects found at “El Arbolillo” provide evidence of a society that had strong trade relations with other villages of the time, such as Zacatenco and Copilco. The site was examined by Christine Niederberger and George Clapp Vaillant, among others.

== Bibliography ==
- Tolstoy, Paul; Suzanne K. Fish, Martin W. Boksenbaum, Kathryn Blair Vaughn y C. Earle Smith (1977), "Early Sedentary Communities of the Basin of Mexico", en Journal of Field Archaeology, 4(1): 91-106. Boston University.
