= Fred Wertheimer =

American lawyer

- Born: Fredric Michael Wertheimer; January 9, 1939 (age 87); Brooklyn, New York
- Education: University of Michigan; Harvard Law School
- Occupations: Attorney, activist
- Spouse: Linda Wertheimer (m. 1969)

Fredric Michael Wertheimer (born January 9, 1939) is an American attorney, lobbyist, and activist notable for his work on campaign finance reform and other government integrity, transparency, and accountability issues.

== Early career ==
He is a graduate of the University of Michigan and Harvard Law School.

From 1967 to 1970 Wertheimer was legislative counsel to Representative Silvio Conte (R-MA) and minority counsel to the House Small Business Committee. In May 1971, he started working for Common Cause, a nonpartisan citizens' lobby, where he was assigned to the issues of campaign finance reform and ending U.S. involvement in the Vietnam War. In 1976, Wertheimer was legal counsel for Common Cause during the Buckley v. Valeo case. He worked there until 1995, serving as legislative director, vice president for program operations and as president from 1981 to 1995. In 1982, he was elected to the Common Cause National Governing Board. Through Common Cause, Wertheimer sought legislation regulating special interest groups and political action committees.

During his 24-year tenure at Common Cause, Wertheimer led the organization's successful campaign to pass the Federal Election Campaign Act (FECA), creating the current system of public financing in presidential campaigns. Wertheimer also led Common Cause's successful battles to enact comprehensive ethics and open government laws for Congress and the executive branch, and was a "key architect" of the nuclear arms control coalition in the 1980s, according to Congressional Quarterly. He also helped to create and publish Common Cause magazine, which won the National Magazine Award for general excellence in 1987. He was succeeded in 1995 by Ann McBride Norton.

In 1996, Wertheimer was a Fellow at the Shorenstein Center on the Press, Politics and Public Policy at Harvard University, and in 1997 he was the J. Skelly Wright Fellow and Visiting Lecturer at Yale Law School. He also has been a political analyst and consultant for CBS News, ABC News and ABC's Nightline.

Wertheimer is currently the president and CEO of Democracy 21, a nonpartisan nonprofit organization, which he founded in 1997. He was named as one of the 90 greatest Washington lawyers of the last 30 years by Legal Times (2008) and as one of Washington's top lobbyists by The Hill, a Capitol Hill newspaper (2009, 2010 and 2011).

Democracy 21 and Wertheimer played major roles in the enactment of the Bipartisan Campaign Reform Act in 2002 (BCRA), the Honest Leadership and Open Government Act in 2007 (HLOGA), the establishment of the Office of Congressional Ethics in 2008, and House passage of the DISCLOSE Act in 2010.

== Awards and honors ==
Wertheimer is the author of "Campaign Finance Reform: The Unfinished Agenda," published in the Annals of the American Academy of Political Science and Social Science and of "TV Ad Wars: How to Reduce the Costs of Television Advertising in our Political Campaigns," published in the Harvard International Journal of Press/Politics. He is the coauthor of "Campaign Finance Reform: A Key to Restoring the Health of Our Democracy," published in The Columbia Law Review.

Wertheimer has received honorary degrees from Colby College, Grinnell College and the Claremont Graduate University. He is a recipient of the COGEL Award for outstanding service in the cause of open and democratic government, given by the Council on Governmental Ethics Laws, an organization of state and federal ethics enforcement officials.

He received the Paul H. Douglas Award for Ethics in Government for 2025, a national honor recognizing those who contribute to the practice and understanding of ethical behavior and fair play in government.

The New York Times has called Wertheimer the "dean of campaign finance reformers," and The Boston Globe has called Wertheimer a "legendary open-government activist.

In 2013, NPR reporter Nina Totenberg wrote, "Fred Wertheimer has helped write every campaign finance reform law since 1974." In 2017, NPR called Democracy 21 one of the most active groups investigating the Trump administration's transparency and ethics and called Wertheimer "one of the progressive movement's leading strategists on ethics and campaign finance laws since the 1980s."

== Personal life ==
In 1969 Wertheimer married Linda Wertheimer, now Senior National Correspondent for National Public Radio, and former NPR national political correspondent and co-host of the NPR news magazine program All Things Considered.
