= John W. deGravelles =

American judge (born 1949)

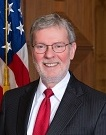

Judge of the United States District Court for the Middle District of Louisiana
- Incumbent
- Assumed office July 23, 2014
- Appointed by: Barack Obama
- Preceded by: James Joseph Brady

Personal details
- Born: John Wheadon deGravelles; 1949 (age 76–77) Lafayette, Louisiana, U.S.
- Parents: Charles deGravelles (father); Virginia deGravelles (mother)
- Relatives: Ann McBride Norton (sister); Mary McBride (niece)
- Education: Louisiana State University (BA, JD)

John Wheadon deGravelles (born in 1949) is a United States district judge of the United States District Court for the Middle District of Louisiana, based in the capital city of Baton Rouge.

== Biography ==
DeGravelles is the son of the late Charles deGravelles and Virginia deGravelles, Louisiana Republicans who were once members of the Republican National Committee. The senior deGravelleses were on the RNC at the same time in 1968. DeGravelles has a twin brother, Charles Nations deGravelles, an Episcopalian archdeacon, were born on November 2, 1949, in Lafayette, Louisiana. His sister, Ann McBride Norton, who died in 2020, was head of the public interest group Common Cause from 1995 to 1999.

DeGravelles received a Bachelor of Arts degree in 1971 from Louisiana State University in Baton Rouge. He received a Juris Doctor in 1974 from the Louisiana State University Paul M. Hebert Law Center with Order of the Coif designation.

From 1974 to 1986, he worked at the law firm of Dué, Dodson, deGravelles, Robinson & Caskey (and its predecessor firms), becoming a partner in 1976. He was a solo practitioner from 1986 to 1987. Starting in 1987, he was a partner at deGravelles, Palmintier, Holthaus & Frugé LLP (and its predecessor firms). During his career, he has handled a wide variety of civil litigation in state and federal courts.

During his career, deGravelles has been actively engaged in legal education and scholarship. Beginning in 1994, deGravelles became a member of the adjunct faculty at Louisiana State University Paul M. Hebert Law Center where he taught courses in Maritime Torts, Advanced Litigation, Pre-Trial Litigation, and Federal Courts.

Since 1993, deGravelles has served as a member of the faculty of Tulane University Law School's Summer Program in Rhodes, Greece, teaching Maritime Personal Injury Law. In association with Tulane Law School, deGravelles has presented lectures on various topics of maritime law in St. Petersburg, Russia; Istanbul, Turkey; Odesa, Ukraine; and Thessaloniki, Greece. In 2015, deGravelles served as a member of the faculty of the LSU Law School's summer program in Lyon, France, teaching maritime law.

DeGravelles was awarded a Fulbright Scholarship to teach American Maritime Private International Law at the Aristotle University of Thessaloniki Law School in Thessaloniki, Greece, during the fall semester of 2001. While there, he also gave lectures on the American judicial system. In March, 2011, in association with the Center for International Legal Studies, deGravelles taught a course on the American judicial system at the Lugansk State University of the International Affairs Law School in Lugansk, Ukraine.

During his career, deGravelles has been active in legal organizations. From 1992 to 1993, he served as president of the Louisiana Association for Justice, formerly the Louisiana Trial Lawyers Association. In 1998, he was the president of the Louisiana chapter of the American Board of Trial Advocates. He was a member of the national board of governors of the American Association for Justice (formerly the American Trial Lawyers Association) from 1993 to 1996 and again from 2011 to 2014. He was admitted as a Fellow of the International Academy of Trial Lawyers in 2006 and the Litigation Counsel of American in 2009. In 2015, he was elected President of the Dean Henry George McMahon American Inn of Court, Inn No. 71. He has been since 1974 a member of the American and Baton Rouge bar associations and the Maritime Law Association since 1996.

=== Federal judicial service ===
On March 13, 2014, President Barack Obama nominated deGravelles to serve as a United States district judge of the United States District Court for the Middle District of Louisiana, to the seat vacated by Judge James Joseph Brady, a Democrat who assumed senior status on December 31, 2013. He received a hearing before the United States Senate Judiciary Committee on May 20, 2014. On June 19, 2014, his nomination was reported out of committee by a voice vote. On July 16, 2014, Senate Majority Leader Harry Reid filed a motion to invoke cloture on deGravelles nomination. On July 22, 2014, the Senate invoked cloture on his nomination by a 57–39 vote. Later that day, deGravelles was confirmed by a 100–0 vote. He received his judicial commission on July 23, 2014.

=== Notable cases ===
- On August 31, 2014, deGravelles partially blocked enforcement of Louisiana's new abortion law which took effect on September 1. The measure requires those performing abortions to have admitting privileges at a hospital within thirty miles of the abortion facility.
- In October 2015, deGravelles issued a temporary restraining order that blocked the administration of then Governor Bobby Jindal from defunding Planned Parenthood within the state. Jindal spokesman Mike Reed said the state would appeal deGravelles' ruling.
- In November 2024, deGravelles issued a preliminary injunction blocking a new Louisiana law requiring public schools to display the Ten Commandments, ruling that the statute is unconstitutional. Louisiana Attorney General Liz Murrill promised to appeal.
- In December 2025, deGravelles permanently blocked enforcement of the Louisiana Secure Online Child Interaction and Age Limitation Act, which required social media companies to verify user ages and implement parental consent mechanisms. The Louisiana Attorney General filed an appeal in the Fifth Circuit in January 2026.
- On May 3, 2026 deGravelles ruled Senate Bill 256 unconstitutional and blocked the state from eliminating the office of Clerk of the Orleans Parish Criminal District Court, which would have prevented Calvin Duncan, elected to the position in November 2025, from taking Office.

Legal offices
Preceded by James Joseph Brady	Judge of the United States District Court for the Middle District of Louisiana; 2014–present	Incumbent
