= Democracy 21 =

U.S. non-profit organization

Democracy 21 is a non-profit organization in the United States that aims to combat the influence of private money in politics by enacting campaign finance reform. It was founded in 1997 by longtime activist Fred Wertheimer. The organization supports stricter campaign finance limits and regulations and opposes the U.S. Supreme Court's ruling in Citizens United v. FEC.
