= Pál Kelemen =

American art historian

Pál Kelemen (24 April 1894 – 15 February 1993) was a Hungarian-American archaeologist, art historian, and international art lecturer who contributed to the research of Pre-Columbian art. Kelemen was one of the first to recognize the importance of medieval Spanish colonial artwork of the Americas. Kelemen received the Order of Merit from the government of Ecuador.

== Early life ==
Born in Budapest, Kelemen studied art history at the universities of Budapest, Munich and Paris, initially with an emphasis in pre-19th century Impressionism. During World War I he served for four years as a Hungarian cavalry officer. He witnessed the fall of Lemberg. After the war Kelemen started to study early Christian and Byzantine art. In 1932, Kelemen moved to the United States. On May 2, 1932 he married Elisabeth Hutchings Zulauf and seven years later became a naturalized US citizen.

== Scholarly contributions ==
Kelemen carried out several cultural missions and surveys in Latin America, some under the patronage of the Cultural Division of the U.S. Department of State. He also conducted art tours and lectures throughout the United States, Latin America and Europe. Kelemen was a fellow of the Royal Anthropological Institute and the recipient of an honorary degree from the University of Arizona.

Kelemen authored several books about art history, particularly on El Greco, and became the founding member of the Bibliophile Society of Hungary. He also contributed to Encyclopædia Britannica and several other publications. Kelemen supported the authenticity of the Dumbarton Oaks birthing figure. In Medieval American Art (1943) Kelemen called the figure a "unique statue... cut from a rather pale mottled jade [sic]... unbelievably smooth over the entire surface".

Kelemen died at the age of 98 in La Jolla, California.

== Memoir ==
In 1972, Indiana University Press published an account of Kelemen's wartime experiences as Hussar's Picture Book. Based on Kelemen's personal diary and covering the entire period of World War I from 1914 to 1918, the book is a memoir of the experiences of a Hungarian cavalry officer of the Blue Hussars of the Imperial army of the Austro-Hungarian Monarchy.

The book provides an uncommon perspective on the war as it is written by a well-educated, multi-lingual, Hungarian officer serving in multiple fronts. Though battles and combat feature throughout, the main focus is on the author's personal life. The war serves as a backdrop to a man of high birth in a society struggling to adapt to the modern world. The portrait provided of war on the eastern front is starkly different from that of the western front described in novels such as Le Feu (Under Fire). Antiquated militaria such as cavalry regiments are only eliminated near the end of the war period. The memoir presents a fairly positive view of the author's service. Written in a different time period, it could easily have passed for pro-war propaganda. Parts of the author's diary were used as such during the war period by the Hungarian government. For most of the book, the view of the war is a positive one and the author's personal experiences harken back to the romantic and idealistic notions of war.
