= George Clapp Vaillant =

American anthropologist (1901–1945)

George C. Vaillant (far left) was an associate curator at the American Museum of Natural History when this group photograph was taken with his colleagues (L-R) Harry L. Shapiro, Nels C. Nelson, and Clark Wissler. Margaret Bourke-White photo, 1937.

George Clapp Vaillant (April 5, 1901 – May 13, 1945) was an American anthropologist.

George Clapp Vaillant was born 1901 in Boston, Massachusetts, and attended Noble and Greenough School in his hometown. After finishing his secondary education at Phillips Academy in Andover, Massachusetts, he went to Harvard University where he received his bachelor's degree in 1922 and Ph.D. in 1927. His Ph.D. thesis established a chronology of Maya ceramics. Later on, his work launched the historical sequence of cultures in pre-Columbian Mexico.

During his college years, he worked at the Harvard Peabody Museum, and continued on excavating in Pecos, New Mexico. At the American Museum of Natural History in New York, N.Y., Vaillant was appointed the position of Assistant Curator in 1927, and promoted to Associate Curator three years later. He became an Honorary Curator at AMNH in 1941, when he accepted an invitation to become the Museum Director at the University of Pennsylvania. His position there was interrupted during the war when he became an Honorary Professor at the National Museum of Anthropology in Mexico in 1942, followed by a year in Peru where he served as the US State Department Cultural Relations Officer stationed in Lima (1943–1944). In 1944, he returned to Philadelphia, resuming his museum directorship at Penn.

Vaillant was elected to the American Philosophical Society in 1943.

Vaillant conducted archaeological expeditions in the Southwest from 1921 to 1922 and 1922 to 1925, in Egypt from 1923 to 1924, and in Central America in 1926 and 1928 to 1936. He also organized archaeological programs throughout Latin America. Three major excavation sites in the Basin of Mexico, Zacatenco, Ticomán, and El Arbolillo, are located.

Aztecs of Mexico: Origins, Rise and Fall of the Aztec Nation was completed in 1941, and a second edition was published posthumously. His other book, Indian Arts in North America, was written in 1939. Vaillant also wrote several monographs on Middle American excavations.

Vaillant was known for the reconstruction of the early stages of Mexican Culture. His excavations at Zacatenco, Ticomán and El Arbollo established the framework for the Formative or Preclassic period in central Mexico. He was also known for his synthesis of Aztec history, which is also written in Aztecs in Mexico. Throughout his research of relating archaeology to the events and descriptions of colonial sources and Mexican traditions, Vaillant concentrated on problems of chronology and culture history. Later in his career Vaillant excavated at several Aztec sites (Chiconautla and Nonoalco), but failed to publish these projects. Several decades later Christina Elson and other scholars at the American Museum of Natural History completed the study of artifacts from these sites and began a program to publish them.

Vaillant shot himself in Devon, Pennsylvania in 1945, at the age of 44. His wife Suzannah Beck Vaillant found him in their yard, a revolver next to him and a fatal wound through his head. The last person to see him alive was his elder son and namesake, George Eman Vaillant, who at that time was 10 years old.

== Major publications ==
- Vaillant, George C. (1930) Excavations at Zacatenco. Anthropological Papers vol. 32, no. 1. American Museum of Natural History, New York.
- Vaillant, George C. (1931) Excavations at Ticoman. Anthropological Papers vol. 32, no. 2. American Museum of Natural History, New York.
- Vaillant, George C. (1935) Excavations at El Arbolillo. Anthropological Papers vol. 35, no. 2. American Museum of Natural History, New York.
- Vaillant, George C. (1939) Indian Arts in North America. Harper and Brothers, New York.
- Vaillant, George C. (1941) Aztecs of Mexico: Origin, Rise and Fall of the Aztec Nation. Doubleday Doran, Garden City.
