= Ann McBride Norton =

American activist and executive (1944–2020)

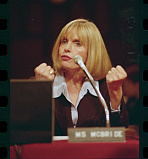
- Born: Virginia Ann deGravelles; June 23, 1944; Lafayette
- Died: May 5, 2020 (aged 75)
- Alma mater: American University; Louisiana State University
- Occupation: Lobbyist
- Employer: Common Cause (1970s–1999)
- Children: Mary McBride
- Parent(s): Charles deGravelles
- Relatives: John W. deGravelles
- Awards: Fulbright Program

Ann McBride Norton (June 23, 1944 – May 5, 2020) was an American activist and non-profit executive. She served as president of Common Cause, a non-partisan watchdog group based in Washington, D.C. She also founded Photovoices International, where she directed projects in China and Indonesia.

== Biography ==
Virginia Ann deGravelles was born in Lafayette, Louisiana on June 23, 1944. Her parents were Charles Camille deGravelles, who served as chairman of the Republican Party of Louisiana, and Virginia (née Wheadon) deGravelles, who was a member of the Republican National Committee. Her brother was John W. deGravelles, a United States district judge.

Norton attended Louisiana State University in Baton Rouge, Louisiana but left in 1964 to marry Charles W. McBride, who was press secretary to Russell B. Long and chief of staff to J. Bennett Johnston.

In the 1970s, McBride Norton was a volunteer at Common Cause during the Watergate scandal before becoming the chief lobbyist for Common Cause on Capitol Hill, then Vice President. In 1995, the Governing Board of Common Cause elected her as president and Chief Executive Office, the organization's first woman President. She was Common Cause's principal spokesperson on the effort to pass the Equal Rights Amendment, and she led the campaign to pass the McCain Feingold Act. She appeared regularly on national radio and television and in the media on the campaign finance reform.

In 1998 she was a Fellow at the Harvard University Kennedy Institute of Politics. In 1992, she earned a bachelor's degree at American University in Washington D.C. Three years later, she succeeded Fred Wertheimer to serve as Common Cause's president and chief executive.

In 1999, McBride Norton and her husband, Edward M. Norton, an environmental activist moved to Southwest China as Senior Advisors to the Yunnan Great Rivers Project, a collaboration between the Government of China and The Nature Conservancy, after she retired from Common Cause in 1999. to protect the region's globally significant biodiversity.

In China, McBride Norton, founded and directed Photovoices - Empowering People Through Photography, a project designed to teach local people to take photographs and tell the stories behind their pictures. The photographs and stories provided information to conservation organizations, scientists, and government officials about biodiversity and the interaction between local communities and cultures and the environment and natural resources. McBride Norton designed the Photovoices project to engage local people and communities in decisions that affect their lives. She directed Photovoices projects in 5 areas in Northwest Yunnan, working with local villages and the Chinese government at every level. The American Museum of Natural History in New York hosted a year-long exhibition of the Photovoices pictures and stories in 2005. Photovoices pictures and stories were also exhibited at the Shanghai Museum and Performing Arts Center, the Hong Kong Exhibition Center, and other venues in China.

McBride Norton continued Photovoices Projects when she moved to Indonesia in 2005, working with WWF - Indonesia, the Ford Foundation, and National Geographic Magazine. Her Photovoices projected spanned 6 locations throughout the Indonesia archipelago. The photographs and stories were exhibited at the United States Ambassador's Residence in Jakarta and traveled with an "American Corners" traveling exhibition. Photovoices International continues to develop projects in Indonesia.

In 2005, Ann McBride Norton received the Fulbright Masaryk Fellowship and taught "The Role of Advocacy and Public Engagement in Emerging Democracies' at Charles University in Prague, Czech Republic.

She was a commentator for National Public Radio sending "Postcards from China" and "Postcards from Indonesia" during the time she lived in those countries.

== Personal life ==
AnnMcBride Norton was an avid traveler, hiker and trekker, river runner, and scuba diver. She died at her home in Washington D.C., on May 5, 2020, at the age of 75, from complications associated with Alzheimer's disease. Her husband and her two children with her first husband, Claire McBride and Mary McBride, survive her.

== See also ==
- Three Parallel Rivers
