= James Joseph Brady =

American judge (1944–2017)

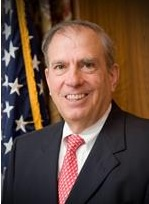

Senior Judge of the United States District Court for the Middle District of Louisiana
- In office December 31, 2013 – December 9, 2017

Judge of the United States District Court for the Middle District of Louisiana
- In office May 25, 2000 – December 31, 2013
- Appointed by: Bill Clinton
- Preceded by: John Victor Parker
- Succeeded by: John W. deGravelles

Personal details
- Born: February 29, 1944 St. Louis, Missouri, U.S.
- Died: December 9, 2017 (aged 73) Baton Rouge, Louisiana, U.S.
- Party: Democratic
- Education: Southeastern Louisiana University (BA); Louisiana State University Law School (JD)

James Joseph Brady (February 29, 1944 – December 9, 2017) was an American lawyer who served as a United States district judge of the United States District Court for the Middle District of Louisiana, based in the capital city of Baton Rouge.

== Education and career ==
Born in St. Louis, Missouri, Brady received a Bachelor of Arts degree from Southeastern Louisiana University in 1966 and a Juris Doctor from Louisiana State University Law School in 1969. He was in private practice in Louisiana from 1969 to 2000. He was a member of the Louisiana Board of Tax Appeals from 1975 to 1980, and was an adjunct professor at Louisiana State University in 1985, 1987 and 1990.

== Federal judicial service ==
On July 14, 1999, Brady was nominated by President Bill Clinton to a seat on the United States District Court for the Middle District of Louisiana vacated by John Victor Parker. Brady was confirmed by the United States Senate on May 24, 2000, and received his commission on May 25, 2000. Brady assumed senior status on December 31, 2013, serving in that status until his death on December 9, 2017. Brady was still active at the time of his death and had been scheduled to preside over a case of an individual charged with attempting to steal President Donald Trump's tax returns, with jury selection scheduled to begin just two days after his death. He died in Baton Rouge at the age of seventy-three.

== Sources ==
Legal offices
Preceded by John Victor Parker	Judge of the United States District Court for the Middle District of Louisiana; 2000–2013	Succeeded by John W. deGravelles
