= Suzannah Beck Vaillant =

American archaeologist (1908–1995)

- Born: Mary Suzannah Beck; March 20, 1908; Mexico City, Mexico
- Died: February 18, 1995 (aged 86); Hanover, New Hampshire, U.S.
- Other names: Suzannah Beck Hatt, Sue Hatt
- Occupations: Archaeologist, translator, activist
- Spouse(s): George Clapp Vaillant, Robert T. Hatt
- Children: 3, including George Eman Vaillant

Mary Suzannah Beck Vaillant Hatt (March 20, 1908 – February 18, 1995) was an American archaeologist, translator, and activist, working on-site in central Mexico with her first husband, anthropologist George Clapp Vaillant, and traveling the world with her second husband, zoologist Robert T. Hatt.

== Early life and education ==
Beck was born in Mexico City, the daughter of American parents, Eman L. Beck and Mary Payne Beck. Her father was a banker. She attended the Spence School in New York City and graduated from Vassar College in 1928. At Vassar, she was an editor of the campus newspaper. She earned a master's degree in psychology from Columbia University. She was a member of Phi Beta Kappa.

== Career ==
Vaillant worked at archaeological sites in Central Mexico with her first husband, George Clapp Vaillant, in the early 1930s. With her second husband, zoologist Robert Torrens Hatt, she traveled in Asia, Africa, and the Americas, studying small mammals including mice, rats, squirrels, and shrews. She worked on translating the poems of Stephen Vincent Benet into Spanish, and works by Eudocio Eavines into English. She also revised and annotated one of her first husband's books, The Aztecs of Mexico, for an updated edition in the 1960s.

Hatt was active in politics, especially in protesting the Vietnam War and supporting the campaigns of Eugene McCarthy. While she was living in Michigan in the 1950s, she was a member of the Urban League Guild. In 1966, as a member of the Episcopal Society for Cultural and Racial Unity, she was arrested in Detroit while protesting the relocation of a family for an urban renewal project. In 1972 she ran for county commissioner in Grafton County, New Hampshire. She was national secretary of the Committee for a Constitutional Presidency when it formed in 1974. She also worked for Common Cause and Hospice.

== Personal life ==
Beck married anthropologist George Clapp Vaillant in 1930. They had three children born between 1932 and 1936, including psychiatrist George Eman Vaillant. The Vaillants lived in Peru during World War II. Her first husband died by suicide in 1945. She married her second husband, Robert T. Hatt, in Baghdad in 1953. They lived in the former home of sculptor Carl Milles in Bloomfield Hills, Michigan, and then in Washington, D.C., from 1967 to 1987. Robert Hatt died in 1989. She died in 1995, at the age of 86, in Hanover, New Hampshire. There are materials concerning her in the Cranbrook Archives in Michigan.

== Publications ==
- Excavations at Gualupita (1934, with George C. Vaillant)
- The Aztecs of Mexico: Origin, Rise, and Fall of the Aztec Nation (1962, revision of George Clapp Vaillant's 1942 work)
