= Common Cause =

American watchdog group advocating government reform

- Formation: 1970; 56 years ago
- Founder: John W. Gardner
- Type: 501(c)4 organization
- Tax ID no.: 52-6078441
- Location: Washington, D.C., U.S.
- Region served: United States
- Method: Advocacy
- Website: www.commoncause.org

Common Cause is a watchdog group based in Washington, D.C., with chapters in 35 US states. It was founded in 1970 by John W. Gardner, a Republican, who was the Secretary of Health, Education, and Welfare in the administration of Lyndon Johnson as well as chair of the National Urban Coalition, an advocacy group for minorities and the working poor in urban areas. In its early days, Common Cause focused its efforts on ending the Vietnam War and lowering the voting age from 21 to 18.

Sometimes identified as liberal-leaning, Common Cause has also been identified as nonpartisan and advocates government reform. It is identified with the reformist "good government" movement and is often described as a watchdog group. The organization's tagline is "holding power accountable" and its stated mission is "upholding the core values of American democracy. We work to create open, honest, and accountable government that serves the public interest; promote equal rights, opportunity, and representation for all; and empower all people to make their voices heard in the political process."

== Issue areas ==
The organization's stated issue areas are "money in politics", "voting and elections", "ethics", "a fair economy", and "media and democracy".

=== Constitutional conventions ===
Common Cause opposes and actively lobbies against modern-day efforts to call an Article V convention to propose amendments to the United States Constitution by both progressive and conservative groups, such as that by the progressive political action committee Wolf PAC to limit large monetary donations to political candidates parties and groups, and by the conservative advocacy group Citizens for Self-Governance's "Convention of the States" initiative, which is backed by some Republican politicians.

In a May 2016 report entitled The Dangerous Path: Big Money's Plan to Shred the Constitution, Common Cause wrote that "There is nothing to prevent the convention, once convened, from proposing additional changes that could limit or eliminate fundamental rights or upend our entire system of government." While a constitutional convention could conceivably overturn the controversial Supreme Court decision in Citizens United v. FEC and limit the role of money in politics (as advocated by groups such as Wolf PAC), Common Cause suggests that the risk of a runaway convention is too great because "state legislatures, the majority of which are controlled by Republicans, would likely control the agenda at a constitutional convention" and as a result it is extremely unlikely "that a convention controlled by those legislatures would really do anything productive on money in politics, on voting rights, on democracy in general". Any amendments would need to be ratified by three-quarters of the states.

=== Ethics ===
Common Cause lobbied Congress to pass the Ethics in Government Act of 1978, requiring government officials to disclose their finances and restricting the "revolving door" between government and business. In 1989, they lobbied for passage of a new Ethics in Government Act, which ended special-interest honoraria for members of Congress and closed a loophole that allowed members to convert campaign funds to personal use.

The organization's efforts led to ethics probes and the resignations of House Speakers Jim Wright in 1988 and Newt Gingrich in 1995.

During the 2016 presidential elections, Common Cause suggested that the Clinton Foundation would create ethics and conflict of interest challenges for Hillary Clinton should she become president. They criticized Hillary Clinton's plan to give Chelsea Clinton control of the foundation and called for an independent audit and full disclosure of the foundation's donors.

The public interest group also criticized Donald Trump for his refusal to release his tax returns during the 2016 presidential election. The organization has been outspoken about the potential conflicts of interest from Trump's businesses and called for Trump to put his assets into a blind trust instead of handing over control of his businesses to his children.

=== Money in politics ===
In 1972, Common Cause sued President Richard Nixon's re-election campaign, the Committee for the Re-Election of the President, under the Federal Corrupt Practices Act in an attempt to force Nixon's campaign to report early campaign contributions. The lawsuit forced the disclosure of the names of several Nixon donors. In 1974, Common Cause supported passage of the Federal Election Campaign Act (FECA), encompassing public financing of presidential campaigns and oversight of campaign ethics through the Federal Election Commission.

==== Publicly-financed elections ====
Common Cause has advocated public financing of elections in order to decrease the influence of special-interest contributions. The group's most successful campaign finance reform efforts have been in New York City in 1999; Connecticut in 2005; Montgomery County, Maryland in 2014; Portland, Oregon in 2016; Howard County, Maryland in 2017; Prince George's County, Maryland in 2018; and California.

=== Voting and elections ===
==== Redistricting ====
The organization has sought to end the practice of gerrymandering in several states. In 2016, it filed a lawsuit in North Carolina challenging the constitutionality of district maps. The organization's North Carolina chapter has led a campaign to create a nonpartisan redistricting process, which has bipartisan support in the state. Common Cause is also challenging redistricting in Democratic-controlled states, such as Maryland. Common Cause took a neutral position on 2025 California Proposition 50, which led to several advisory board members of the California branch resigning in protest.

==== Voting machines ====
Common Cause advocates a voter-verified paper audit trail for election machines in all states. The organization has documented complaints about electronic voting machines.

==== National popular vote ====
Common Cause is in favor of establishing a national popular vote for presidential elections to replace the current electoral college system. Following the November 2016 U.S. presidential election, Common Cause called for the National Popular Vote Compact to counteract what it called the "anti-democratic" outcome in that election.

==== Voter identification ====
Common Cause is partner organization of VoteRiders.

== Organizational overview ==
=== Leadership ===
Karen Hobert Flynn became the organization's president in June 2016. She served in this role until her death in March 2023. Virginia Kase Solomón was named as the tenth President of Common Cause on December 14, 2023.

The following individuals have served as president of Common Cause:

- Jack Conway (1971–1975)
- David Cohen (1975–1981)
- Fred Wertheimer (1981–1995)
- Ann McBride (1995–1999)—longtime Common Cause employee who served as vice president and lobbyist for the group before serving as president
- Scott Harshbarger (1999–2002)—served as Massachusetts Attorney General before becoming Common Cause president
- Chellie Pingree (2003–2007)—after stepping down as president of Common Cause, was elected as U.S. Representative from Maine
- Robert W. (Bob) Edgar (2007–2013)—served as Democratic U.S. Representative from Pennsylvania before becoming president of Common Cause; died in office in April 2013
- Miles S. Rapoport (2014–2016)—was president of Demos and Secretary of State of Connecticut before becoming president of Common Cause
- Karen Hobert Flynn (2016–2023)—died in office in March 2023
- Virginia Kase Solomón (2023- )—served as the CEO of the League of Women Voters, 2018-2023.

The following are three of the most prominent individuals who have served as chairs of Common Cause's board:

- John W. Gardner (1970–1978)—founder and chairman of the organization; served two three-year terms as chairman before stepping down.
- Archibald Cox (1980–1992)—former Watergate special prosecutor.
- Robert Reich (2013–2018*)—former Secretary of Labor in the Clinton Administration. (*Due to Common Cause's policy of nonpartisanship, Reich took a leave of absence from the group from February 2016 until after the November 2016 election in order to become involved in Bernie Sanders' presidential campaign.)

=== Budget ===
In 2024, Common Cause had annual expenses of around $9 million while its sister organization, the Common Cause Educational Fund, spent about $17 million.

== See also ==
- Rucho v. Common Cause, a 2019 landmark case of the US Supreme Court involving Common Cause
