= Nathan v. Alamo Heights Independent School District =

- Court: U.S. District Court for the Eastern District of Texas
- Full case name: Rabbi Mara Nathan, et al. v. Alamo Heights Independent School District, et al.
- Docket nos.: 5:25-cv-00756

Nathan v. Alamo Heights Independent School District is a federal lawsuit against Texas Senate Bill 10 which requires the Ten Commandments to be displayed in all public schools in the State of Texas. It is the third lawsuit against laws requiring the Ten Commandments to be displayed in schools after Roake v. Brumley and Stinson v. Fayetteville School District No. 1. The lawsuit has been filed in the U.S District Court for the Eastern District of Texas San Antonio Division. The lawsuit has been filed by 16 families, including those from Hindu, Christian and Jewish backgrounds who are represented by the ACLU, Freedom from Religion Foundation and the law firm of Simpson Thacher & Bartlett.

== Lawsuit History ==
On July 2, 2025, the complaint against Texas SB 10 was filed in the U.S District Court for the Eastern District of Texas and is the second lawsuit against the act.

In April 2026, the U.S. Court of Appeals for the Fifth Circuit ruled that S.B. 10 did not violate the Constitution. In August 2026, the plaintiffs in Nathan and Cribbs Ringer v. Comal Independent School District, filed a joint petition for a writ of certiorari asking the U.S. Supreme Court to review the Fifth Circuit's rulings.
