= Chris Dier =

American educator and author

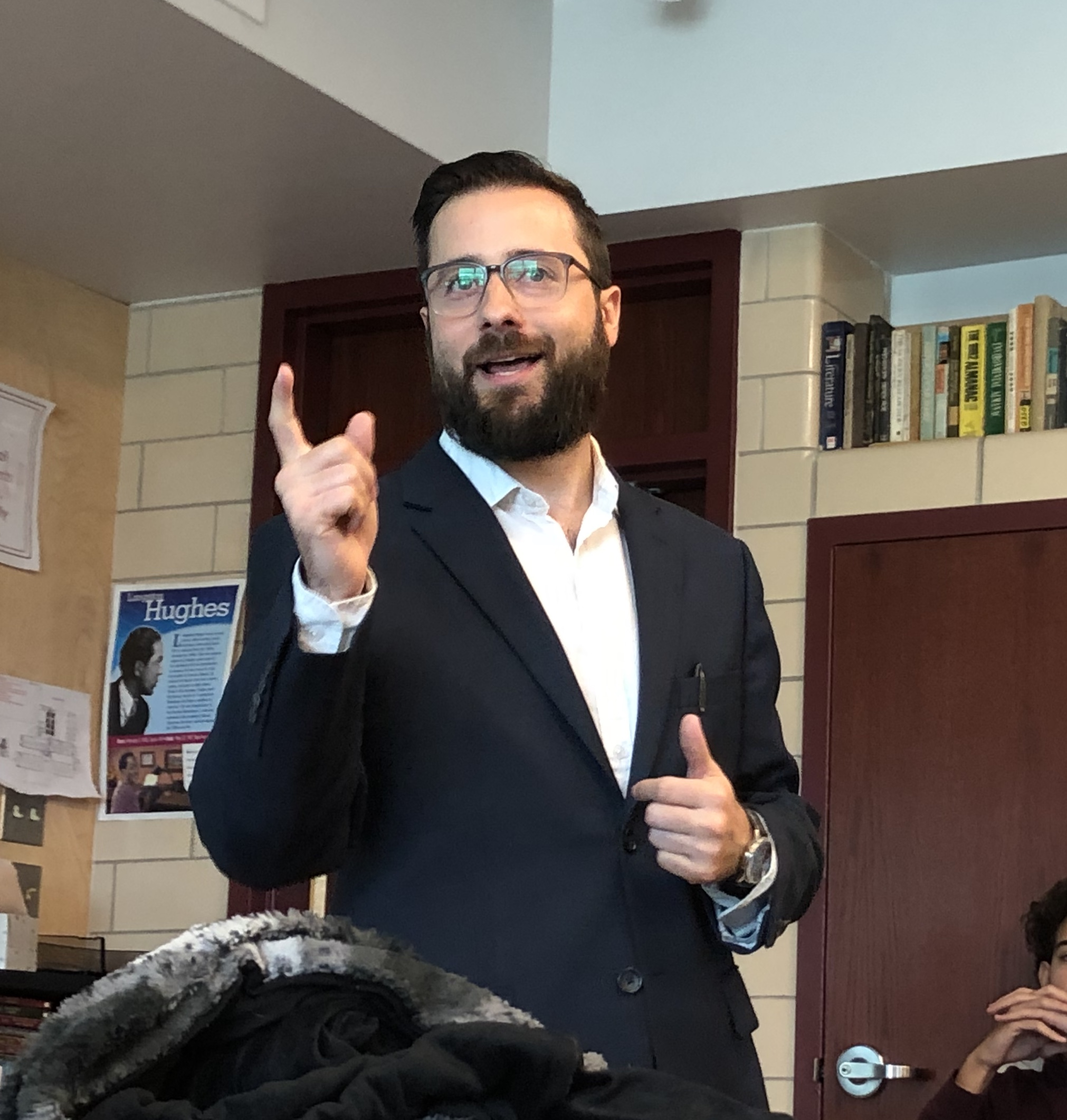
- Born: Christopher Mark Dier; New Orleans, Louisiana, U.S.
- Education: East Texas Baptist University (BA); University of New Orleans (MA)
- Occupations: Social Studies Teacher and Author
- Years active: 2010–present
- Known for: 2020 Louisiana Teacher of the Year and Author
- Website: chrisdier.com

Chris Dier is an American educator and author. He taught in St. Bernard Parish, Louisiana, for a decade before transitioning to Benjamin Franklin High School in New Orleans. Dier was named the 2020 Louisiana Teacher of the Year and a 2020 National Teacher of the Year Finalist. Dier authored The 1868 St. Bernard Parish Massacre: Blood in the Cane Fields.

== Early life and education ==
Dier was born in New Orleans, Louisiana. In 2005, Dier relocated to East Texas during his senior year of high school after Hurricane Katrina destroyed his family's home. Dier graduated from East Texas Baptist University with a bachelor's degree in history.

Dier returned to St. Bernard Parish to become a teacher, attributing inspiration to his mother, Lynne Dier, a retired teacher. Dier has since received three Master's degrees in education-related fields and is currently a PhD candidate.

== Career ==
Dier was featured in numerous publications and outlets for his work in the classroom. In 2019, Dier was featured in The New York Times and the Canadian Broadcast Corporation for his lesson on Donald Trump's impeachment.

Dier has been featured in The Washington Post, Education Week, Politico, the School Library Journal, New Orleans Magazine,The Times-Picayune, and France 24. Dier was a guest on CNN's Global Town Hall – Coronavirus: Facts and Fears with Anderson Cooper and Sanjay Gupta regarding opening up schools. In 2021, Dier participated in an interview with First Lady Jill Biden and Gayle King in the White House for CBS Mornings regarding teaching during COVID-19.

Outside of teaching, Dier is a writer. In 2017, Dier authored The 1868 St. Bernard Parish Massacre: Blood in the Cane Fields, by the History Press, detailing one of the deadliest massacres against African-Americans in Louisiana history. The St. Bernard Parish massacre occurred during the Reconstruction era as an effort to suppress the Black vote during the 1868 United States presidential election.

In 2020, Dier published "An Open Letter to Seniors" to let students know that they're not forgotten and to relate to them considering he lost his senior year due to Katrina. The letter was viewed over a million times, reached countries across the world, and was featured in numerous outlets, including in Education Week, the Washington Post, the American Heart Association News, and the Chicago Tribune. He was also featured on NPR, and The Today Show, and local news outlets WGNO and WWLTV.

In 2024, Dier filed a lawsuit in the United States District Court for the Eastern District of Louisiana against Governor Jeff Landry regarding House Bill 71, which mandates that teachers display the Ten Commandments in public school classrooms, on the grounds that the law violates the Establishment Clause of the First Amendment of the U.S. Constitution. Dier is represented by Arnold and Porter.

== Accolades ==
Dier was selected as the 2020 Louisiana State Teacher of the Year and named a finalist for National Teacher of the Year. Dier was the first educator from Louisiana to be selected as a finalist since 1989. Dier was also named a 2020 Louisianian of the Year by Louisiana Life Magazine, awarded the 2021 H. Councill Trenholm Memorial Award by the National Education Association, and named the 2021 Louisiana History Teacher of the Year by the Gilder Lehrman Institute of American History.
