= House Bill 71 =

Louisiana law directing schools to display the Ten Commandments

- The Great Seal of the State of Louisiana

Louisiana State Legislature
- Citation: H.B. 71
- Enacted by: Louisiana House of Representatives
- Enacted by: Louisiana State Senate
- Signed by: Governor Jeff Landry
- Signed: June 19, 2024
- Effective: January 1, 2025

Initiating chamber: Louisiana House of Representatives
- Bill citation: House Bill No. 71
- Introduced by: Dodie Horton

Summary
- To enact R.S. 17:2122 and 3996(B)(82), relative to public elementary, secondary, and postsecondary schools; to provide for the display of certain historical documents; to provide for the display of the Mayflower Compact, the Declaration of Independence, the Northwest Ordinance, and the Ten Commandments; to provide for displays in each classroom; to provide relative to the use of donations or the acceptance of donated displays for this purpose; to provide for applicability; to provide for legislative intent; to provide for historical context; to provide for an effective date; and to provide for related matters.
- Status: Not yet in force

Louisiana House Bill 71 (H.B. 71), or Act 676, was a law passed by the Louisiana State Legislature and signed by Governor Jeff Landry in June 2024 that directs schools to display a copy of the Ten Commandments in classrooms.

On November 12, 2024, United States District Judge John W. deGravelles ruled House Bill 71 unconstitutional, arguing that it was "coercive to students" who "cannot opt out of viewing the Ten Commandments when they are displayed in every classroom, every day of the year, every year of their education". Louisiana Attorney General Elizabeth Murrill stated that the state would appeal the case to the United States Court of Appeals for the Fifth Circuit, A three-member panel of the Court of Appeals affirmed the district court's ruling of the bill's unconstitutionality on June 20, 2025; however, on 20 February 2026, the full Court voted 12–6 to lift the injunction.

== Background ==
In its 1980 decision Stone v. Graham, the United States Supreme Court ruled that a Kentucky statute requiring the posting of the Ten Commandments in public classrooms across the state violated the Establishment Clause of the First Amendment, noting that the Ten Commandments were not fully secular, and thus violated the separation of church and state.

In 2005, the Supreme Court ruled in Van Orden v. Perry that a display of the Ten Commandments at the Texas State Capitol was constitutional on the grounds that it was an acknowledgement of the secular history of religion in the United States. However, on the same day Van Orden was decided, the Supreme Court also ruled in McCreary County v. American Civil Liberties Union that displaying the Ten Commandments in courthouses and public schools was unconstitutional, on the grounds that such display had the intent of promoting religion.

Louisiana State Representative Dodie Horton introduced the bill in the Louisiana House of Representatives, describing the Ten Commandments as the basis of all laws. After passing the Committee on Education in a 10–3 vote, the bill was signed into law by Louisiana Governor Jeff Landry on June 19, 2024.

Before the passage of House Bill 71, similar bills were introduced in other states, such as South Carolina, Oklahoma, and Texas. The passage of House Bill 71 follows other laws in Louisiana regulating education, including a law allowing chaplains to be employed by public schools, and a law requiring transgender students to be referred to using the pronouns aligned to their sex assigned at birth. Horton herself, a Southern Baptist, has introduced other bills similarly requiring the display of text in classrooms, including a law in 2023 requiring the display of the national motto, "In God We Trust", in classrooms.

== Content ==
The law mandates that by January 1, 2025, all state-funded school classrooms in Louisiana must have "a poster or framed document that is at least eleven inches by fourteen inches" with a King James Bible version of the Ten Commandments as the display's "central focus", in a "large, easily readable font". The display will also include a "context statement" explaining the Ten Commandments' role in American education and government. Additionally, the law allows for the display of the Mayflower Compact, the Northwest Ordinance, and the United States Declaration of Independence in conjunction with the Ten Commandments, but does not require their display. The law does not provide state funding for the posters; instead, it relies on donations.

== Legal challenges ==
House Bill 71 faced numerous legal challenges before its enforcement in January 2025.

=== Roake v. Brumley ===
Immediately after the bill was signed, the American Civil Liberties Union, Americans United for Separation of Church and State, and the Freedom from Religion Foundation announced that they would sue the state of Louisiana over the new law. Indeed, on June 24, 2024, the groups, along with the law firm Simpson Thacher & Bartlett, filed a lawsuit in the United States District Court for the Middle District of Louisiana known as Roake v. Brumley, representing parents of Louisiana public school children against Louisiana Superintendent of Education Cade Brumley, the Louisiana Board of Elementary and Secondary Education, and five school boards, seeking both a preliminary injunction and to declare the law unconstitutional.

On November 12, 2024, United States District Judge John W. deGravelles ruled House Bill 71 unconstitutional, arguing that it was "coercive to students" who "cannot opt out of viewing the Ten Commandments when they are displayed in every classroom, every day of the year, every year of their education". He reasoned that by requiring a religious text rather than other important documents such as the Constitution or Bill of Rights, the bill was "overtly religious" and thus violated the First Amendment.

According to Louisiana Attorney General Elizabeth Murrill, the ruling only applied to the parishes of East Baton Rouge, Livingston, St. Tammany, Orleans and Vernon, whose school boards were named as defendants in the case, although deGravelles' ruling required Brumley and the Louisiana Board of Elementary and Secondary Education to inform all other school boards as well. Murrill also stated that the state would appeal the case to the United States Court of Appeals for the Fifth Circuit.

On November 15, the Court of Appeals granted an emergency stay motion from the state, limiting the ruling to the five parishes named as defendants in the case. However, on November 20, it decided against temporarily lifting deGravelles' ruling pending appeal, which kept the lower court ruling in effect until the Court of Appeals decided the case.

On June 20, 2025, a three-member panel of the Court of Appeals affirmed the district court's ruling, preserving its temporary injunction. However, on February 20, 2026, The Fifth Circuit Court of Appeals lifted the preliminary injunction against Louisiana House Bill 71. The court determined that it was too early to decide whether the law violated the Constitution because the specific ways schools would implement the required displays were not yet known. Judge James Ho stated, "[The law] is not just constitutional – it affirms our nation’s highest and most noble traditions".

=== Other legal challenges ===
On September 23, 2024, Christopher Dier, the 2020 Louisiana Teacher of the Year, filed a lawsuit in the United States District Court for the Eastern District of Louisiana challenging the law.

== Reactions ==
House Bill 71 has faced both praise and criticism since its passing.

=== Politicians ===
The Lieutenant Governor of Texas, Dan Patrick, stated that he would pass a similar bill requiring the Ten Commandments in schools in the next legislative session, known as Senate Bill 1515. He criticized Speaker of the Texas House of Representatives Dade Phelan for failing to put the bill to a vote on the floor in the last legislative session on Twitter. Then-former president of the United States Donald Trump similarly endorsed the law, both in a speech to evangelical Christians on June 22, 2024 and in a post on Truth Social. Speaker of the House Mike Johnson similarly endorsed the law, stating that he expected it to survive legal challenges.

In response to the attempted assassination of Donald Trump in Pennsylvania, Governor Landry stated his belief that if the Ten Commandments were present in the classroom of assassin Thomas Matthew Crooks, the shooting would not have occurred.

Other politicians have criticized the legislation; in particular, Democratic Louisiana Senate member Royce Duplessis called the lawmakers supporting the legislation "hypocritical".

== Similar Bills ==
US map of states with Ten Commandments laws as of 2026: Louisiana, Arkansas, Texas, and Alabama (red) require schools to have it; Tennessee (orange) allows schools to have it

Similar bills to Louisiana HB 71 have failed in Montana, North Dakota and South Dakota.

In April 2025 Arkansas,, in May 2025, Texas and in April 2026, Alabama passed a similar bill.

== See also ==
- Roake v. Brumley
- Stone v. Graham
- Stinson v. Fayetteville School District No. 1
- Act 573 of Arkansas (Arkansas version)
- Texas Senate Bill 10 (Texas version)
