= Act 573 of Arkansas =

Arkansas State Legislature
- Long title: AN ACT REGARDING THE DISPLAY OF THE NATIONAL MOTTO AND THE TEN COMMANDMENTS; AND FOR OTHER PURPOSES.
- Citation: §1-4-133
- Territorial extent: State of Arkansas
- Passed: April 7, 2025
- Signed: April 14, 2025

Legislative history
- Introduced: March 11, 2025
- Passed: March 19, 2025
- Voting summary: 27 voted for; 4 voted against
- Voting summary: 71 voted for
- Voting summary: 20 Votes voted against
- Status: Blocked

Act 573 of Arkansas (SB 433) is a law that requires the display of the Ten Commandments in all public schools and local government buildings. It was introduced by Senate Jim Dotson and was signed into law by Governor Sarah Huckabee Sanders on April 14, 2025. The law is similar to others in Oklahoma and Louisiana, the latter of which was blocked by a federal judge in November 2024.

In August 2025, enforcement of the law was blocked by federal judge Timothy L. Brooks in the Western District of Arkansas.

== Lawsuit ==
On June 11, 2025, seven families sued in the U.S District Court for the Western District of Arkansas arguing that the law went against their faith and that there is no long history of displaying the ten commandments in public schools in the United States. The lawsuit is backed by the Freedom from Religion Foundation, the American Civil Liberties Union and Americans United for Separation of Church and State.

In August, the federal judge for the Western District of Arkansas, Timothy L. Brooks, blocked the law from being enforced, stating the reason the law was written was "most likely because the state is part of a coordinated strategy among several states to inject Christian religious doctrine".
