= Texas Senate Bill 10 =

2025 Texas law

Senate Bill 10

Texas Legislature
- Long title: Relating to the display of the Ten Commandments in public school classrooms.
- Territorial extent: Texas
- Enacted by: Texas Senate
- Enacted: May 28, 2025
- Enacted by: Texas House of Representatives
- Signed by: Greg Abbott
- Signed: June 21, 2025
- Effective: September 1, 2025

Initiating chamber: Texas Senate
- Introduced by: Phil King and Mayes Middleton

Summary
- Mandates that public schools in the state of Texas display the Ten Commandments in a clearly visible place.
- Status: Unknown

Texas Senate Bill 10 (S.B. 10) is a 2025 law in the state of Texas that requires all public schools in the state to include the Ten Commandments in the classroom. It was passed by the Texas Legislature on May 28, 2025, along party lines and was signed into law by Governor Greg Abbott on June 21, 2025. It was set to go into effect on September 1, 2025, although it was partially blocked by Federal Judge Fred Biery. On April 21, 2026, the U.S. Court of Appeals for the Fifth Circuit ruled that the state law does not violate the U.S. Constitution or establish a state religion and reversed the lower court's injunction.

It was originally introduced by Texas state senators Phil King and Mayes Middleton. Texas had attempted to pass a bill similar to S.B. 10 in 2023. Some supporters claimed that the Ten Commandments had historical value and not only religious value. The bill drew comparisons to a similar law, House Bill 71, which was passed in neighboring Louisiana in 2024. The American Civil Liberties Union and other civil liberty organizations have vowed to sue Texas over the law. Most of the controversy regarding S.B. 10 involves the separation of church and state and freedom of religion. The Establishment Clause of the First Amendment prohibits an official state religion, which is another potential issue.

The Ten Commandments in a Texas High School marked with a pride flag sticker

== Provisions ==
S.B. 10 requires public schools to display the Ten Commandments anywhere clearly visible. The law requires the display to be framed or a poster, and include the exact text of the Ten Commandments provided in the law without alternatives. It must also be at least 16 inches (41 cm) wide and 20 inches (51 cm) tall.

== Reactions ==
=== Support ===
Lieutenant Governor Dan Patrick applauded the main author of the bill, state senator Phil King, for introducing the bill. The Jewish Press also supported the bill because of the Torah. Texas Republicans released a statement that a "wide range of societal problems" were applicable to the lack of the Ten Commandments in classrooms. President Donald Trump had previously supported a nearly identical bill in Louisiana.

=== Opposition ===
The bill was passed along party lines, with Texas Democrats mostly opposing S.B. 10. State representative Vincent Perez (D-77) stated in an interview that the bill did not teach history and only promoted a single religion, which was against freedom of religion. San Antonio Express-News released an op-ed in May 2025 in opposition to S.B. 10. The Interfaith Alliance, a religious and political advocacy group, released a statement with over 160 faith leaders in Texas opposing the bill.

== Litigations ==
US map of states with Ten Commandments laws as of 2026: Louisiana, Arkansas, Texas, and Alabama (red) require schools to have it; Tennessee (orange) allows schools to have it

After the enactment, a group of families in multiple school districts filed suit, alleging that the law violates the Establishment Clause and the Free Exercise Clause of the U.S. Constitution. On August 20, 2025, U.S. District Judge Fred Biery issued a preliminary injunction in eleven school districts. Texas Attorney General Ken Paxton filed an appeal with the US Court of Appeals for the Fifth Circuit. The Fifth Circuit ruled that SB 10 was constitutional on April 21, 2026, stating the law violates neither the Establishment Clause or the Free Exercise Clause. Part of the Fifth's argument was that because the Lemon test had been considered abandoned in the Supreme Court case Kennedy v. Bremerton School District (2022), its use to justify the Supreme Court's earlier decision of Stone v. Graham (1980), also dealing with the display of the Ten Commandments in public schools, was no longer justified, so the court was no longer bound by Stone. In August 2026, the plaintiffs in Nathan v. Alamo Heights Independent School District and Cribbs Ringer v. Comal Independent School District, filed a joint petition for a writ of certiorari asking the U.S. Supreme Court to review the Fifth Circuit's rulings.
