= Stinson v. Fayetteville School District No. 1 =

Lawsuit challenging Act 573 of Arkansas

- Court: United States District Court for the Western District of Arkansas
- Full case name: Stinson et al v. Fayetteville School District No. 1 et al

Court membership
- Judge sitting: Timothy L. Brooks

Stinson v. Fayetteville School District No. 1 is a lawsuit challenging the Act 573 of Arkansas which would require all public schools and local government buildings to have a 16 x 20-inch display of the Ten Commandments. The lawsuit was filed on June 11, 2025, by seven families including some Christians in the U.S District Court for the Western District of Arkansas. The lawsuit is helped by the American Civil Liberties Union, Freedom from Religion Foundation, and Americans United for Separation of Church and State.
