= Thou shalt not covet =

One (or two) of the Ten Commandments

"Thou shalt not covet" (from Biblical Hebrew: לֹא תַחְמֹד, romanized: Lōʾ ṯaḥmōḏ) is the most common translation of one (or two, depending on the numbering tradition) of the Ten Commandments or Decalogue, which are widely understood as moral imperatives by legal scholars, Jewish scholars, Catholic scholars, and Protestant scholars. The Book of Exodus and the Book of Deuteronomy both describe the Ten Commandments as having been spoken by God, inscribed on two stone tablets by the finger of God, and, after Moses broke the original tablets, rewritten by God on replacements. On rewriting, the word covet (for the neighbour’s house) changed to ‘desire’ (תתאוה).

In traditions that consider the passage a single commandment, the full text reads:

You shall not covet your neighbor’s house. You shall not covet your neighbor’s wife, or his male or female slaves, his ox or donkey, or anything that belongs to your neighbor.

— Exodus 20:17

The Catechism of the Catholic Church connects the command against coveting with the command to "love your neighbor as yourself." Ibn Ezra on the question of "how can't a person covet a beautiful thing in his heart?" wrote that the main purpose of all the commandments is to straighten the heart.

== Ancient usage ==
The Hebrew word translated "covet" is chamad (חמד) which is commonly translated into English as "covet", "lust", and "strong desire." The Hebrew Bible contains a number of warnings and examples of negative consequences for lusting or coveting. For example, when God was instructing Israel regarding the false religion of the Canaanites, he warned them not to covet the silver or gold on their idols, because this can lead to bringing detestable things into the home.

The images of their gods you're to burn in the fire. Don't covet the silver and gold on them, and don't take it for yourselves, or you'll be ensnared by it, for it's detestable to the LORD your God. Don't bring a detestable thing into your house or you, like it, will be set apart for destruction. Utterly abhor and detest it, for it's set apart for destruction.

— Deuteronomy 7:25–26

The Book of Joshua contains a narrative in which Achan incurred the wrath of God by coveting prohibited gold and silver that he found in the destruction of Jericho. This is portrayed as a violation of covenant and a disgraceful thing.

The Book of Proverbs warns against coveting, "Above all else, guard your heart, for it's the wellspring of life." The prophet Micah condemns the coveting of houses and fields as a warning against lusting after physical possessions. The Hebrew word for "covet" can also be translated as "lust", and the book of Proverbs warns against coveting in the form of sexual lust.

Do not lust in your heart after her beauty or let her captivate you with her eyes, for the prostitute reduces you to a loaf of bread, and the adulteress preys upon your very life.

— Proverbs 6:25–26

== Jewish views ==
This commandment is directed against the sin of envy. Man is given the gift of human intelligence in order to be able to sift out the good from the bad, even in his/her own thoughts. Bava Batra teaches that a person can even harm his neighbor with his eyes. It asserts that damage caused by looking is also regarded as damage that is prohibited. Even if the covetous desire is concealed in the heart, the covetous desire in itself is regarded by the Torah as damaging to the neighbor.

Philo of Alexandria describes covetous desire as a kind of insurrection and plotting against others, because the passions of the soul are formidable. He regards desire as the worst kind of passion, but also one over which the individual exercises voluntary control. Therefore, near the conclusion of his discourse on the Decalogue, Philo exhorts the individual to make use of this commandment to cut off desire, the fountain of all iniquity. Left unchecked, covetous desire is the source of personal, interpersonal, and international strife:

"Is the love of money, or of women, or of glory, or of any one of the other efficient causes of pleasure, the origin of slight and ordinary evils? Isn't it owing to this passion that relationships are broken asunder, and change the good will which originates in nature into an irreconcilable enmity? And aren't great countries and populous kingdoms made desolate by domestic seditions, through such causes? And aren't earth and sea continually filled with novel and terrible calamities by naval battles and military expeditions for the same reason?"

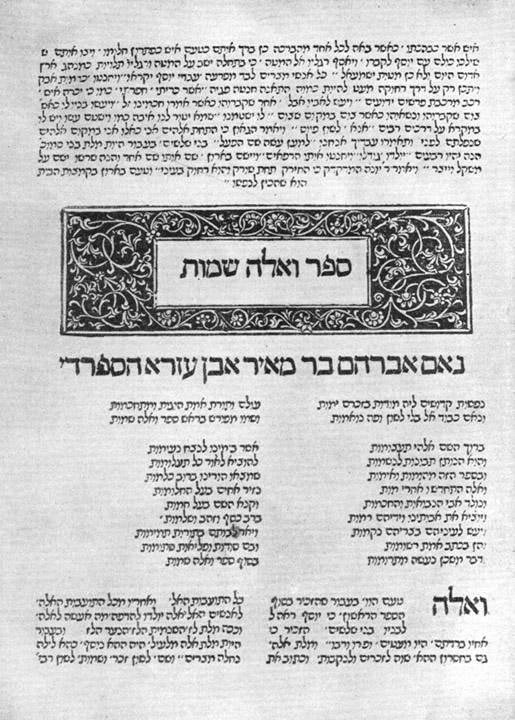
The Book Exodus with the commentary of Abraham ibn Ezra, Naples 1488

Abraham ibn Ezra taught that a person can control his desires by training his heart to be content with what God has allotted to him.

"When he knows that God has forbidden his neighbor's wife to him, then she's more elevated in his eyes than the princess in the eyes of the peasant. And so he's satisfied with his portion and doesn't allow his heart to covet and desire something that's not his, for he knows that God doesn't wish to give it to him; he cannot take it by force or by his thoughts or schemes. He has faith in his Creator, that He'll provide for him and do what's good in His eyes."

Maimonides (the Rambam) viewed the prohibition of coveting as a fence or boundary intended to keep adherents a safe distance away from the very serious sins of theft, adultery, and murder:

"Desire leads to coveting, and coveting leads to stealing. For if the owner (of the coveted object) doesn't wish to sell, even though he is offered a good price and is entreated to accept, the person (who covets the object) will come to steal it, as it's written (Mikha 2:2) [Micah 2:2], 'They covet fields and (then) steal them.' And if the owner approaches him with a view to reclaiming his money or preventing the theft, then he'll come to murder. Go and learn from the example of Achav [Ahab] and Navot [Naboth]."

Maimonides' admonition to learn from the example of Ahab and Naboth refers to the narrative in 1 Kings 21 in which King Ahab of Israel tried to convince Naboth the Jezreelite to sell him the vineyard Naboth owned adjacent to the king's palace. Ahab wanted the land to use as a vegetable garden, but Naboth refused to sell or trade the property to Ahab saying, "The LORD forbid that I should give up to you what I've inherited from my fathers!" Ahab's wife Jezebel then conspired to obtain the vineyard by writing letters in Ahab's name to the elders and nobles in Naboth's town instructing them to have two scoundrels bear false witness claiming that Naboth has cursed both God and the king. After Naboth was subsequently stoned to death, Ahab seized possession of Naboth's vineyard. The text describes the LORD as very angry with Ahab, and the prophet Elijah pronounces judgment on both Ahab and Jezebel.

== New Testament views ==
The Gospel of Luke describes Jesus' warning to guard one's heart against covetousness. "Take care, and be on your guard against all covetousness, for one's life doesn't consist in the abundance of his possessions." Jesus also describes the sins that defile a person as sins from coming from untamed desires in the heart. The Epistle of James portrays covetous desire residing in the heart as being the internal source of temptation and sin. James goes on to describe how covetous desire leads to fighting and that lack of material possessions is caused by not asking God for them and by asking with wrong motives.

You covet and can't obtain, so you fight and quarrel. You don't have, because you don't ask. You ask and don't receive, because you ask wrongly, to spend it on your passions. You adulterous people! Don't you know that friendship with the world is enmity with God? Therefore whoever wishes to be a friend of the world makes himself an enemy of God.

— James 4:2-4

The Epistle to the Ephesians and the Epistle to the Colossians regard the sin of covetousness as a kind of idolatry and list this sin along with sexual immorality and impurity which give rise to the wrath of God.

But sexual immorality and all impurity or covetousness must not even be named among you, as is proper among saints. Let there be no filthiness nor foolish talk nor crude joking, which are out of place, but instead let there be thanksgiving. For you may be sure of this, that everyone who's sexually immoral or impure, or who's covetous (that is, an idolater), has no inheritance in the kingdom of Christ and God. Let no one deceive you with empty words, for because of these things the wrath of God comes upon the sons of disobedience.

— Ephesians 5:5-6

The New Testament stresses thanksgiving and contentment as proper heart attitudes that contrast covetousness. John the Baptist exhorted soldiers to be content with their pay rather than extorting money by threats and false accusations. The book of Hebrews encourages one to keep his life free from the love of money and "be content with what you have" and depend on the promises and help of God rather than trusting in wealth. The book of 1 Timothy contains a classic warning against the love of money and stresses that it's great gain to be content with food and clothing.

Now there's great gain in godliness with contentment, for we brought nothing into the world, and we can't take anything out of the world. But if we have food and clothing, with these we'll be content. But those who desire to be rich fall into temptation, into a snare, into many senseless and harmful desires that plunge people into ruin and destruction. For the love of money is a root of all kinds of evils. It's through this craving that some have wandered away from the faith and pierced themselves with many pangs.

— 1 Timothy 6:6-10

== Catholic Church views ==
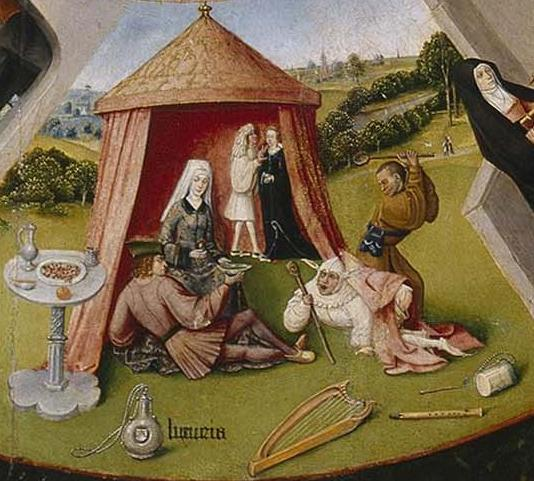
Detail: Luxuria (Lust), in The Seven Deadly Sins and the Four Last Things, by Hieronymus Bosch

The Catholic Church considers the prohibition on coveting in Deuteronomy 5:21 and Exodus 20:17 to include two commandments, which are numbered the ninth and tenth. In the Catholic view, the ninth commandment is a prohibition on carnal concupiscence (or lust), and the tenth commandment prohibits greed and the setting of one's heart on material possessions.

=== Prohibition of carnal concupiscence (lust) ===
The ninth commandment forbids "the interior, mental desire or plan" to do adultery, which is strictly forbidden by the sixth commandment. It's considered sinful when desired or thought lustfully and deliberately with "full knowledge and full consent of the will".

A key point in the Catholic understanding of the ninth commandment is Jesus' statement in the Sermon on the Mount, "Every one who looks at a woman lustfully has already committed adultery with her in his heart." There is an emphasis on the thoughts and attitudes of the heart as well as the promise that the pure in heart will both see God and be like him.

The sixth beatitude proclaims, "Blessed are the pure in heart, for they shall see God." "Pure in heart" refers to those who have attuned their intellects and wills to the demands of God's holiness, chiefly in three areas: charity; chastity or sexual rectitude; love of truth and orthodoxy of faith. …The "pure in heart" are promised that they will see God face to face and be like him.( 1 Corinthians 13:12; 1 John 3:2) Purity of heart is the precondition of the vision of God. Even now it enables us to see according to God, to accept others as "neighbors"; it lets us perceive the human body - ours and our neighbor's - as a temple of the Holy Spirit, a manifestation of divine beauty.

While baptism confers upon the Christian the grace of purification from sins, the baptized must continue to struggle against disordered desires and the lust of the flesh. By God's grace he can prevail 1) by virtue of the gift of chastity which empowers love with an undivided and upright heart 2) by purity of intention which seeks to find and fulfill the will of God in everything 3) by purity of vision which disciplines the feelings and imagination and refuses complicity with impure thoughts, and 4) by prayer which looks to God for help against temptation and casts one's cares upon God.

Adherence to the ninth commandment's requirement of purity requires modesty, which "protects the intimate center of the person". Modesty refuses to uncover "what should remain hidden". Modesty is a servant of chastity and guides how one looks at others and behaves toward them in protective conformity with the dignity of the human person. Modesty encourages patience and moderation in loving relationships, requiring that the conditions for the definitive giving and commitment of man and woman be fulfilled to one another. It's a decency that inspires one's clothing. Modesty is discreet and avoids harmful curiosity.

There's a modesty of the feelings as well as of the body. It protests, for example, against the voyeuristic explorations of the human body in certain advertisements, or against the solicitations of certain media that go too far in the exhibition of intimate things. Modesty inspires a way of life which makes it possible to resist the allurements of fashion and the pressures of prevailing ideologies. The forms taken by modesty vary from one culture to another. Everywhere, however, modesty exists as an intuition of the spiritual dignity proper to man. It is born with the awakening consciousness of being a subject. Teaching modesty to children and adolescents means awakening in them respect for the human person.

— Catechism of the Catholic Church

In addition to personal purity and modesty, the Catholic Church teaches that Christian purity requires a purification of the social climate. Communications media ought to demonstrate respect and restraint in their presentations which should be free from widespread eroticism and the inclination to voyeurism and illusion. Moral permissiveness rests on a wrongheaded understanding of human freedom. Education in the moral law is necessary for the development of true freedom. Educators should be expected to give young people "instruction respectful of the truth, the qualities of the heart, and the moral and spiritual dignity of man."

=== Prohibition of greed and envy of possessions ===
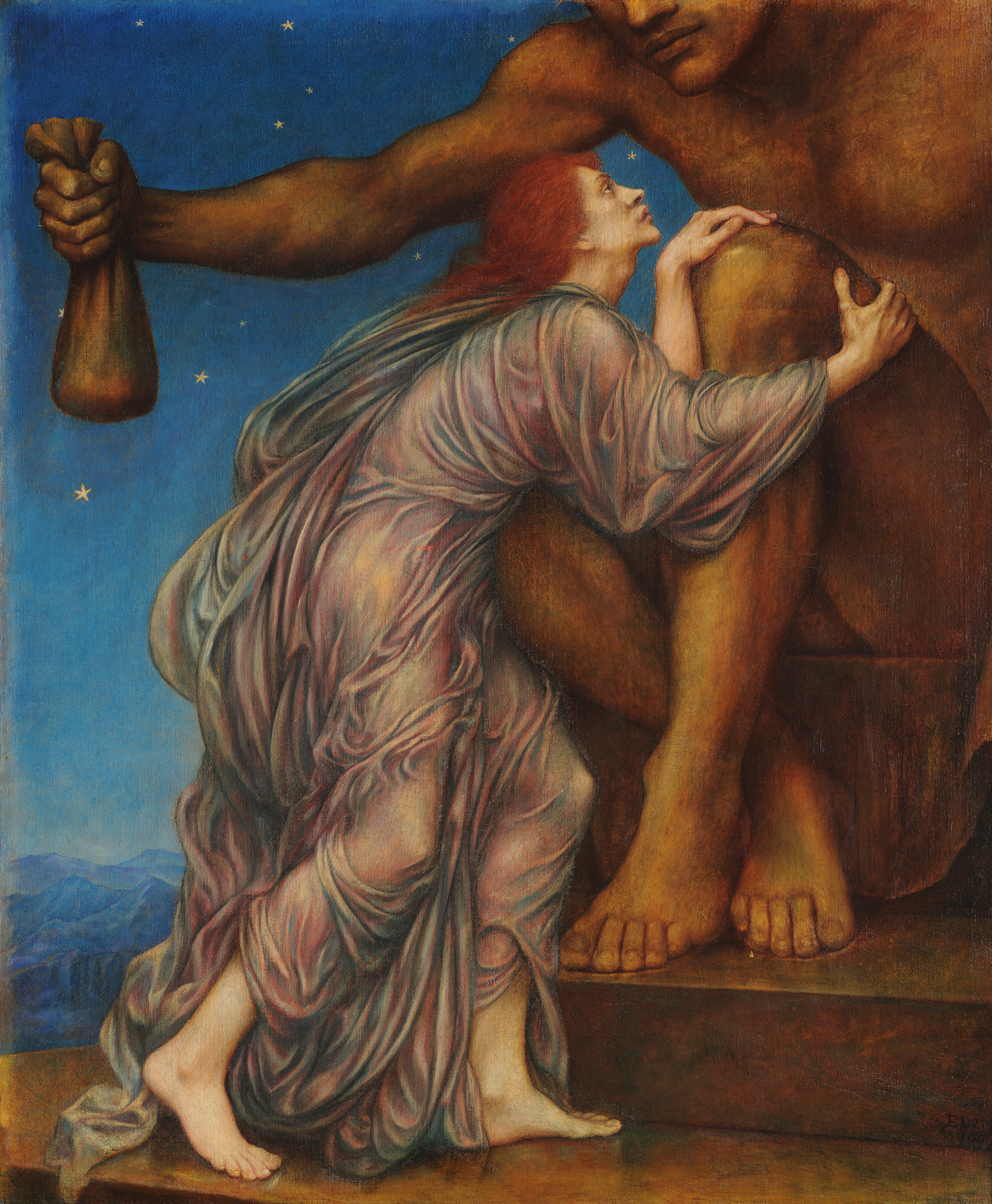
1909 painting The Worship of Mammon, the New Testament representation and personification of material greed, by Evelyn De Morgan.

Catholic teaching on the prohibition of greed and envy center around Christ's admonishments to desire and store up treasure in Heaven rather than on Earth, "For where your treasure is, there'll your heart be also." The tenth commandment is regarded as completing and unfolding the ninth. The tenth commandment forbids coveting the goods of another, as the root of the stealing and fraud forbidden by the commandment, "You shan't steal." "Lust of the eyes" leads to the violence and injustice forbidden by the commandment, "You shan't murder." Covetousness, like sexual immorality, originates in the idolatry prohibited by the first three commandments. Along with the ninth commandment, the tenth summarizes the entire Ten Commandments, by focusing on the intentions and desires of the heart.

Covetous desires create disorder because they move beyond satisfying basic human needs and "exceed the limits of reason and drive us to covet unjustly what is not ours and belongs to another or is owed to him." Greed and the desire to amass earthy goods without limit are forbidden as are avarice and the passion for riches and power. "You shan't covet" means that we should banish our desires for whatever doesn't belong to us. Never having enough money is regarded as a symptom of the love of money. Obedience to the tenth commandment requires that envy be banished from the human heart. Envy is a capital sin that includes sadness at the sight of another's goods and the immoderate desire to acquire them for oneself. The baptized person should resist envy by practicing good will and rejoicing and praising God for material blessings granted to neighbor and brother. God warns man away from what seems "good for food . . . a delight to the eyes . . . to be desired to make one wise," and law and grace turn men's hearts away from avarice and envy and toward the Holy Spirit who satisfies man's heart.

But now the righteousness of God has been manifested apart from law, although the law and the prophets bear witness to it, the righteousness of God through faith in Jesus Christ for all who believe." (Romans 3:21-22) Henceforth, Christ's faithful "have crucified the flesh with its passions and desires"; they are led by the Spirit and follow the desires of the Spirit."(Galatians 5:24, cf. Romans 8:14, 27)

— Catechism of the Catholic Church

Catholic teaching reminds that Jesus enjoins his disciples to prefer him to everything and everyone, and bids them "renounce all that [they have]" for his sake and that of the Gospel. Jesus gave his disciples the example of the poor widow of Jerusalem who gave out of her poverty all that she had to live on. Detachment from riches is portrayed as obligatory for entrance into the Kingdom of heaven. "Blessed are the poor in spirit" illustrates that those who voluntarily don't receive their physical needs are more inclined to seek fulfillment of their spiritual needs through Jesus Christ. "The Lord grieves over the rich, because they find their consolation in the abundance of goods." "I want to see God" expresses the true desire of man. The water of eternal life quenches the thirst for God. Attachment to the goods of this world are a bondage. The Scriptural remedy is the desire for true happiness that's found in seeking and finding God. Holy people must struggle, with grace from on high, to obtain the good things God promises. Christ's faithful put to death their cravings and, with the grace of God, prevail over the seductions of pleasure and power. For what does it profit a man to gain the whole world, yet lose his own soul?

== Protestant views ==
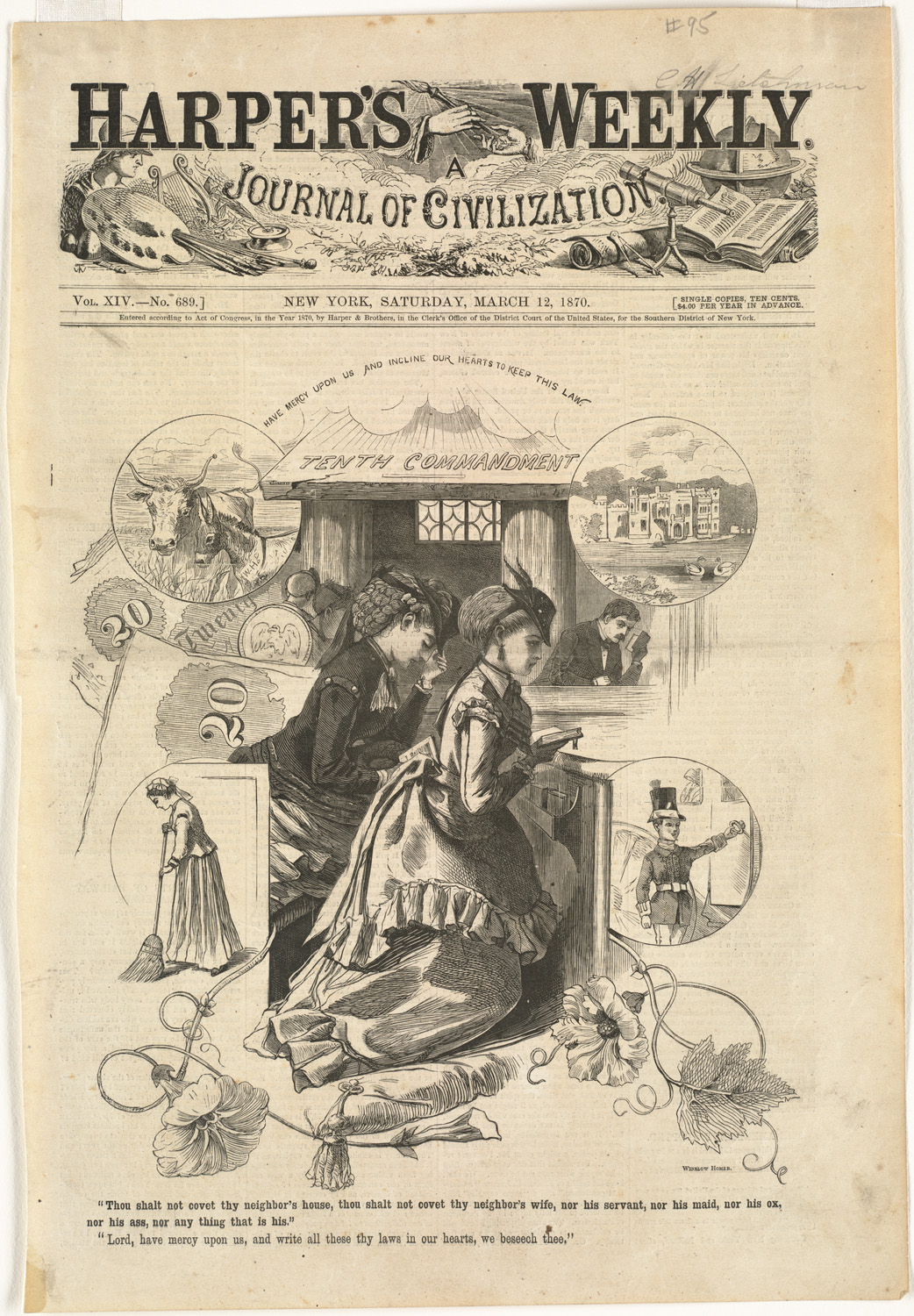
"Tenth Commandment", Harpers Weekly, March 12, 1870

Martin Luther views sinful human nature such that no person naturally desires to see others with as much as oneself, each acquiring as much as he can while pretending to be pious. The human heart, Luther says, is deceitful, knowing how to adorn oneself finely while concealing one's rascality.

For we're so inclined by nature that no one desires to see another have as much as himself, and each one acquires as much as he can; the other may fare as best he can. And yet we pretend to be godly, know how to adorn ourselves most finely and conceal our rascality, resort to and invent adroit devices and deceitful artifices (such as now are daily most ingeniously contrived) as though they were derived from the law codes; yea, we even dare impertinently to refer to it, and boast of it, and won't have it called rascality, but shrewdness and caution. In this lawyers and jurists assist, who twist and stretch the law to suit it to their cause, stress words and use them for a subterfuge, irrespective of equity or their neighbor's necessity. And, in short, whoever is the most expert and cunning in these affairs finds most help in law, as they themselves say: Vigilantibus iura subveniunt [that is, The laws favor the watchful].

— Martin Luther, The Large Catechism

Luther further explains that the tenth commandment isn't intended for the rogues of the world, but for the pious, who wish to be praised and considered as honest and upright people, because they haven't broken any of the outward commandments. Luther sees covetousness in the quarreling and wrangling in court over inheritances and real estate. He sees covetousness in financiering practiced in a manner to obtain houses, castles, and land through foreclosure. Likewise, Luther sees the tenth commandment as forbidding contrivances to take another man's wife as one's own and uses the example of King Herod taking his brother's wife while his brother was still living.

In whatever way such things happen, we must know that God doesn't wish that you deprive your neighbor of anything that belongs to him so that he suffer the loss and you gratify your avarice with it, even if you could keep it honorably before the world; for it's a secret and insidious imposition practised under the hat, as we say, that it may not be observed. For although you go your way as if you'd done no one any wrong, you've nevertheless injured your neighbor; and if it's not called stealing and cheating, yet it's called coveting your neighbor's property, that is, aiming at possession of it, enticing it away from him without his will, and being unwilling to see him enjoy what God has granted him.

— Martin Luther, The Large Catechism

John Calvin views the tenth commandment as a demand for purity of the heart, above and beyond the outward actions. Calvin distinguishes between making an explicit design to obtain what belongs to our neighbor and a covetous desire in the heart. For Calvin, design is a deliberate consent of the will, after passion has taken possession of the mind. Covetousness may exist without such a deliberate design, when the mind is stimulated and tickled by objects on which we set our affection.

As, therefore, the Lord previously ordered that charity should regulate our wishes, studies, and actions, so he now orders us to regulate the thoughts of the mind in the same way, that none of them may be depraved and distorted, so as to give the mind a contrary bent. Having forbidden us to turn and incline our mind to wrath, hatred, adultery, theft, and falsehood, he now forbids us to give our thoughts the same direction.

— John Calvin

In explaining the prohibition on covetousness, Calvin views the mind as either being filled with charitable thoughts toward one's brother and neighbor, or being inclined toward covetous desires and designs. The mind wholly imbued with charity has no room for carnal desires. Calvin recognizes that all sorts of fancies rise up in the mind, and he exhorts the individual to exercise choice and discipline to shifting one's thoughts away from fleshly desires and passions. Calvin asserts that God's intention in the command is to prohibit every kind of perverse desire.

Matthew Henry sees the tenth commandment striking at the root of many sins by forbidding all desire that may yield injury to one's neighbor. The language of discontent and envy are forbidden in the heart and mind. The appetites and desires of the corrupt nature are proscribed, and all are enjoined to see our face in the reflection of this law and to submit our hearts under the government of it.

The foregoing commands implicitly forbid all desire of doing that which will be an injury to our neighbour; this forbids all inordinate desire of having that which will be a gratification to ourselves. "O that such a man's house were mine! Such a man's wife mine! Such a man's estate mine!" This is certainly the language of discontent at our own lot, and envy at our neighbour's; and these are the sins principally forbidden here. St. Paul, when the grace of God caused the scales to fall from his eyes, perceived that this law, Thou shalt not covet, forbade all those irregular appetites and desires which are the first-born of the corrupt nature, the first risings of the sin that dwelleth in us, and the beginnings of all the sin that' committed by us: this is that lust which, he says, he hadn't known the evil of, if this commandment, when it came to his conscience in the power of it, hadn't shown it to him, Rom. 7:7.

— Matthew Henry

== See also ==
- Seven Laws of Noah
- Sin
- Thoughtcrime
