= Roake v. Brumley =

2025 United States Fifth Circuit Court of Appeals case

- Court: United States Court of Appeals for the Fifth Circuit
- Decided: February 20, 2026
- Docket nos.: No. 24-30706
- Citation: ___ F.4th ___ (5th Cir. 2026)

Case history
- Appealed from: United States District Court for the Middle District of Louisiana

Holding
- Vacated the district court's preliminary injunction and remanded for further proceedings.

Case opinions
- Decision by: Per curiam

Roake v. Brumley is a United States federal court case regarding Louisiana House Bill 71, which requires the Ten Commandments to be prominently displayed in all public classrooms in Louisiana. On November 12, 2024, it was ruled unconstitutional by the United States District Court for the Middle District of Louisiana. A three-judge panel from the United States Court of Appeals for the Fifth Circuit unanimously upheld the district court's ruling on June 20, 2025. On October 6, 2025, the full Fifth Circuit Court of Appeals agreed to hear the case en banc. On February 20, 2026, the en banc Fifth Circuit vacated the district court's preliminary injunction and remanded the case for further proceedings, allowing the law to take effect while litigation continues.

== Trial court ==
On June 24, 2024, a group of multi-faith and non-religious Louisiana parents brought suit on their own behalf and on behalf of their minor children, challenging the constitutionality of H.B. 71 under the Establishment Clause and Free Exercise Clause of the First Amendment to the United States Constitution. They named as defendants the Louisiana State Superintendent of Education, Cade Brumley, several members of the Louisiana State Board of Elementary and Secondary Education (BESE) in their official capacities, and five parish school boards.

Plaintiffs moved for preliminary injunctive relief shortly after filing their complaint. Defendants, in turn, moved to dismiss the complaint, opposed the preliminary injunction, and alternatively moved to stay the injunction pending appeal.

On November 12, 2024, United States District Judge John W. deGravelles largely denied the motions to dismiss, denied the motion to stay the injunction pending an appeal, and issued a preliminary injunction, stating that H.B. 71 is "unconstitutional on its face".

== Court of Appeals ==
=== Panel decision (vacated) ===
On November 15, 2024, the United States Fifth Circuit Court of Appeals granted an emergency stay motion from the state of Louisiana, limiting the ruling to the five parishes whose school boards were named as defendants in the case. Judges Jerry Smith and Kurt Engelhardt voted for the stay and Judge James Graves voted against. On December 30, 2024, the Fifth Circuit court rejected a petition for an initial hearing en banc, wherein the case would be heard by the whole appellate court instead of just three judges. The court was polled and voted against the petition 14-3. Oral argument took place on January 23, 2025, before Judges Dennis, Haynes, and Ramirez.

==== Majority Opinion ====
In a unanimous decision authored by Judge Ramirez, the United States Court of Appeals for the Fifth Circuit upheld the district court's preliminary injunction enjoining H.B. 71. The panel held that the statute violated the Establishment Clause of the First Amendment and was facially unconstitutional.

The panel first addressed jurisdictional objections raised by the state, rejecting arguments that the plaintiffs lacked standing or that their claims were unripe. Drawing heavily on precedents such as Abington School District v. Schempp and Ingebretsen v. Jackson Public School District, the court held that both students and their parents had standing to challenge H.B. 71 before its implementation. On the merits, the panel applied the reasoning of the Supreme Court's decision in Stone v. Graham, which invalidated a nearly identical Kentucky statute. Although Stone had relied on the now-abandoned Lemon test, the court emphasized that Stone remained binding precedent. The court also rejected Louisiana's argument that the law had a secular historical or educational purpose.

==== Concurrence ====
Judge Dennis authored a concurring opinion agreeing with the majority that H.B. 71 is facially unconstitutional under the Establishment Clause. He wrote separately to address the state's alternative argument that the "offended observer" theory of standing is unsupported by contemporary Supreme Court caselaw. Judge Dennis rejected this characterization, noting that longstanding precedent recognizes standing where individuals are directly and involuntarily exposed to government-sponsored religious messages, particularly in public schools. He also emphasized the continuing relevance of Stone v. Graham even after the Supreme Court's abandonment of the Lemon test, and that the Louisiana statute presents similar constitutional concerns.

=== En banc proceedings ===
On October 6, 2025, the full Fifth Circuit voted to rehear the case en banc in front of all active judges on the court. The grant of rehearing vacated the panel's June 20, 2025 ruling. The district court's preliminary injunction remained in effect pending en banc review.

==== En banc decision ====
On February 20, 2026, the en banc Fifth Circuit, in a 12–6 per curiam decision, vacated the district court's preliminary injunction and remanded for further proceedings. The ruling allows Louisiana law to take effect pending further litigation.

In its ruling, the Fifth Circuit held that the challenge was premature for judicial resolution because the scripture had not been deployed, and the required factual context did not yet exist. The court noted, however, that "nothing in today's narrow holding prevents future as-applied challenges once the statute is implemented and a concrete factual record exists."

==== Dissents ====
Six judges dissented. Judge James L. Dennis authored a dissenting opinion concluding that the statute violates the Establishment Clause. He argued that placing the Ten Commandments in public school classrooms would expose children to "government‑endorsed religion in a setting of compulsory attendance," which "is precisely the kind of establishment the Framers anticipated and sought to prevent."

== See also ==
- Abington School District v. Schempp
- Stone v. Graham
- Kennedy v. Bremerton School District
- Lemon v. Kurtzman
- Establishment Clause
- Ten Commandments in public schools
