= Ten Commandments =

Biblical principles relating to ethics and worship

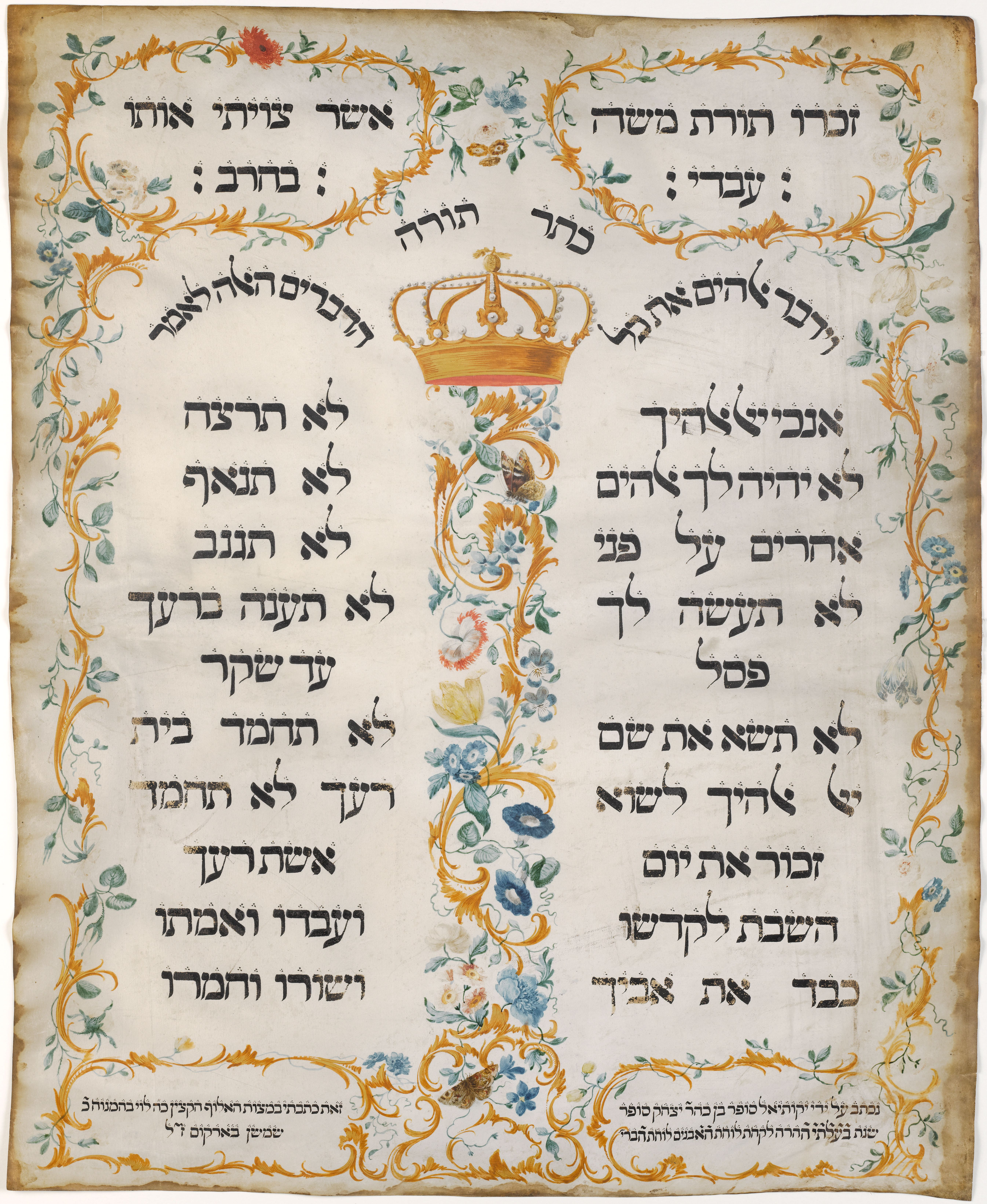
This 1768 parchment by Jekuthiel Sofer emulated the 1675 Ten Commandments at the Amsterdam Esnoga synagogue

The Ten Commandments (Note: (Biblical Hebrew: עֲשֶׂרֶת הַדִּבְּרוֹת, romanized: ʿĂśéreṯ had-Dibbərôṯ, lit. 'The Ten Words'), also called the Decalogue (from Latin decalogus, from Ancient Greek δεκάλογος, dekálogos, lit. 'ten words')) are religious and ethical directives, structured as a covenant document, that, according to the Hebrew Bible, were given by God to Moses. The text of the Ten Commandments appears in three markedly distinct versions in the Hebrew Bible: at Exodus 20:1–17, Deuteronomy 5:6–21, and the "Ritual Decalogue" of Exodus 34:11–26.

The biblical narrative describes how God revealed the Ten Commandments to the Israelites at Mount Sinai amidst thunder and fire, gave Moses two stone tablets inscribed with the law, which he later broke in anger after witnessing the worship of a golden calf, and then received a second set of tablets to be placed in the Ark of the Covenant. Scholars have proposed a range of dates and contexts for the origins of the Decalogue. Interpretations of its content vary widely, reflecting debates over its legal, political, and theological development, its relation to ancient treaty forms, and differing views on authorship and emphasis on ritual versus ethics.

Different religious traditions divide the seventeen verses of Exodus 20:1–17 and Deuteronomy 5:4–21 into ten commandments in distinct ways, often influenced by theological or mnemonic priorities despite the presence of more than ten imperative statements in the texts. The Ten Commandments are the foundational core of Jewish law (Halakha), connecting and supporting all other commandments and guiding Jewish ritual and ethics. Most Christian traditions regard the Ten Commandments as divinely authoritative and foundational to moral life, though they differ in interpretation, emphasis, and application within their theological frameworks. The Quran presents the Ten Commandments given to Moses as moral and legal guidance focused on monotheism, justice, and righteousness, paralleling but differing slightly from the biblical version. Interpretive differences arise from varying religious traditions, translations, and cultural contexts affecting Sabbath observance, prohibitions on killing and theft, views on idolatry, and definitions of adultery.

In the United States, they have remained a contentious symbol in public spaces and schools, with debates intensifying through the 20th and 21st centuries and culminating in laws in the 2020s in Texas, Louisiana, and Arkansas mandating their display—laws now facing legal challenges over separation of church and state. The Ten Commandments have been depicted or referenced in various media, including two major films by Cecil B. DeMille, the Polish series Dekalog, the American comedy The Ten, multiple musicals and films, and a satirical scene in Mel Brooks’s History of the World Part I.

== Terminology ==
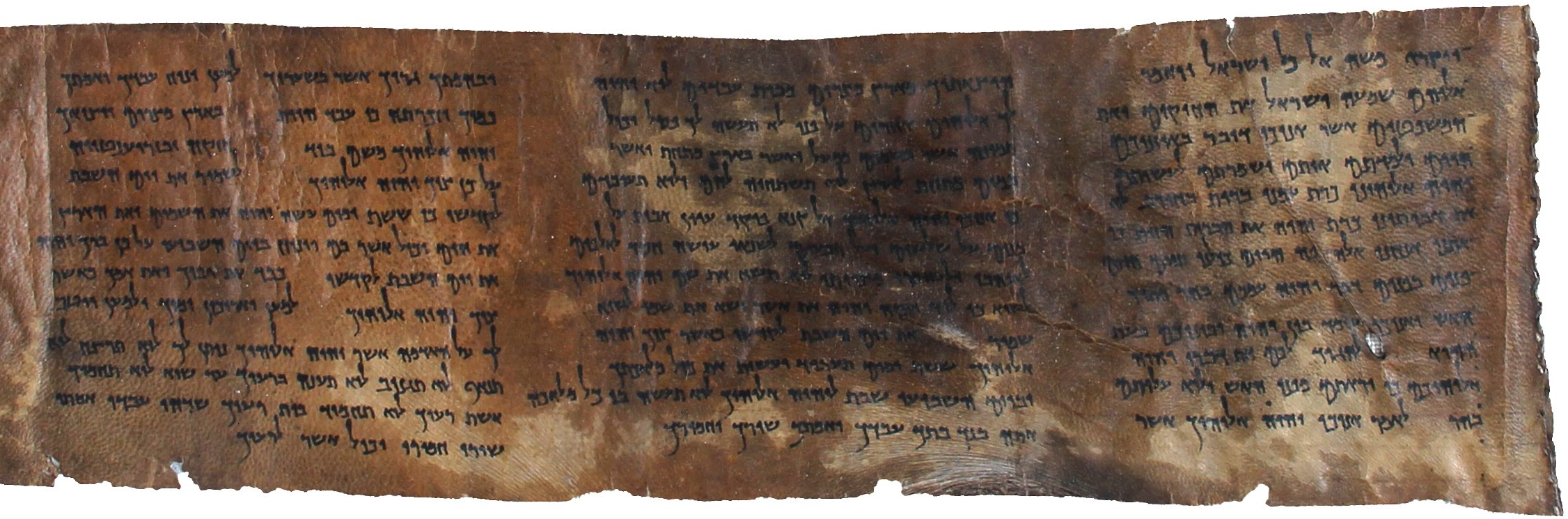
Part of the All Souls Deuteronomy, containing the oldest extant copy of the Decalogue. It is dated to the early Herodian period, between 30 and 1 BCE.

The term, "Ten Commandments" originates in several places in the Torah: Exodus 34:28, Deuteronomy 4:13 and Deuteronomy 10:4. In all sources, the phrase is translatable as "the ten words", "the ten sayings", or "the ten matters". In Mishnaic Hebrew they are called עֲשֶׂרֶת הַדִּבְּרוֹת (ʿĂśéreṯ had-Dibbərôṯ), a precise equivalent. (Note: Nouns often underwent this shift in gender and stem type between Biblical and Mishnaic Hebrew without any shift in meaning. Compare, for example, BH ōhalîm and MH ăhiloṯ.)

In the Septuagint, the 2nd–3rd BC century Greek translation of the Hebrew Bible, the phrase was translated as δεκάλογος, dekálogos or "ten-word"; this Greek word became decalogus in Latin, which entered the English language as "Decalogue", providing an alternative name for the Ten Commandments. The Tyndale and Coverdale English Christian biblical translations used "ten verses". The Geneva Bible used "ten commandments", whose convention was followed by the Bishops' Bible and the Authorized Version (the "King James" version). Most major English versions henceforth have used the word "commandments".

The stone tablets, as opposed to the Ten Commandments inscribed on them, are called לוּחוֹת הַבְּרִית (Lūḥôṯ hab-Bərîṯ), "tablets of the covenant", or לֻחֹת הָעֵדֻת (Lūḥôṯ hā-ʿƏḏūṯ), "tablets of the testimony".

== Biblical narrative ==
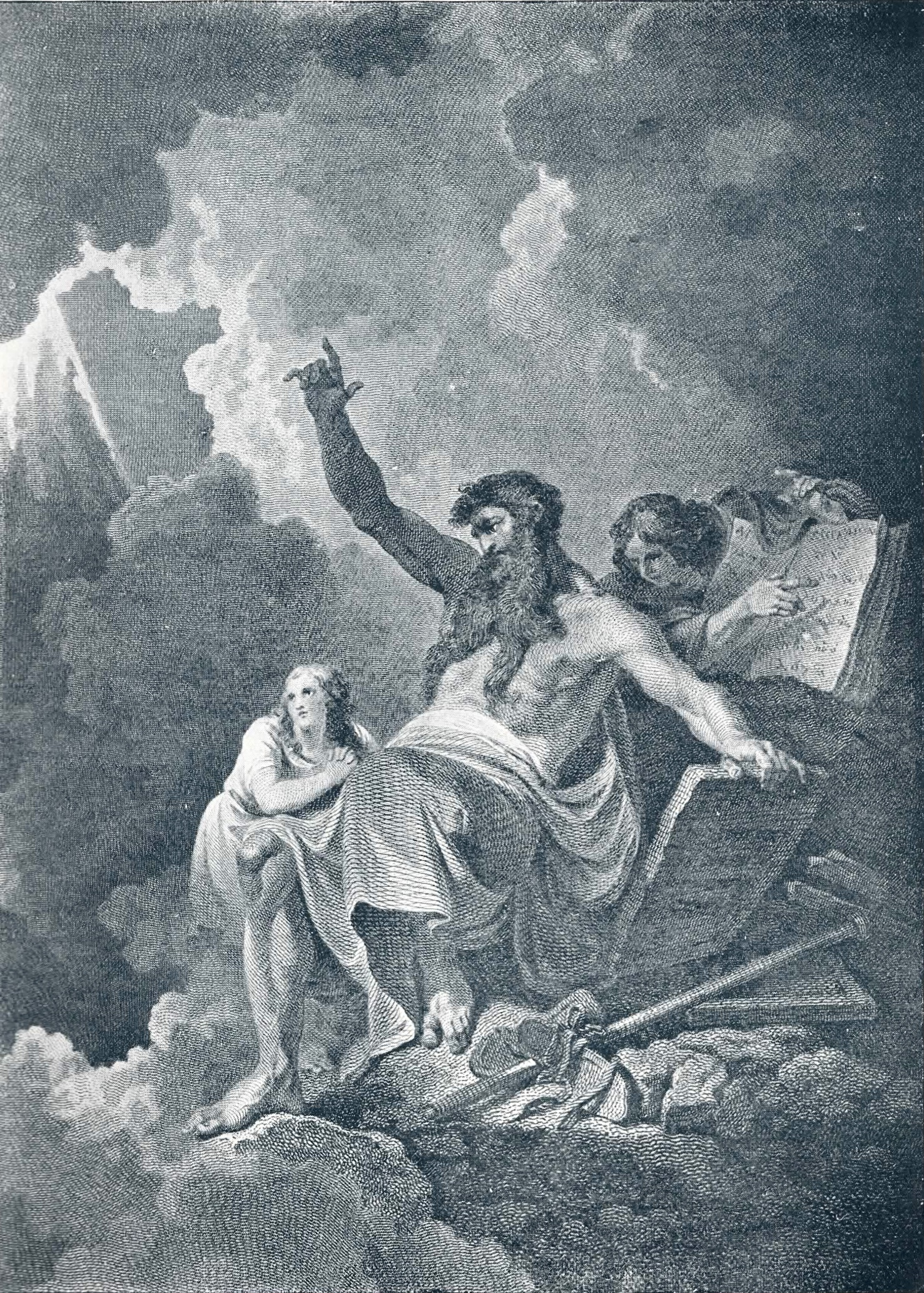
1896 illustration depicting Moses receiving the commandments

The biblical narrative of the revelation at Sinai begins in Exodus 19 after the arrival of the children of Israel at Mount Sinai (also called Horeb). On the morning of the third day of their encampment, "there were thunders and lightnings, and a thick cloud upon the mount, and the voice of the trumpet exceeding loud", and the people assembled at the base of the mount. After "the LORD came down upon mount Sinai", Moses went up briefly and returned to prepare the people, and then in Exodus 20 "God spoke" to all the people the words of the covenant, that is, the "Ten Commandments" as it is written. Modern biblical scholarship differs as to whether Exodus 19–20 describes the people of Israel as having directly heard all or some of the decalogue, or whether the laws are only passed to them through Moses.

The people were afraid to hear more and moved "afar off", and Moses responded with "Fear not." Nevertheless, he drew near the "thick darkness" where "the presence of the Lord" was to hear the additional statutes and "judgments", all which he "wrote" in the "Book of the Covenant" which he read to the people the next morning, and they agreed to be obedient and do all that the LORD had said. Moses escorted a select group consisting of Aaron, Nadab and Abihu, and "seventy of the elders of Israel" to a location on the mount where they worshipped "afar off" and they "saw the God of Israel" above a "paved work" like clear sapphire stone.

And the LORD said unto Moses, Come up to me into the mount, and be there: and I will give thee tablets of stone, and a law, and commandments which I have written; that thou mayest teach them. ^{13} And Moses rose up, and his minister Joshua: and Moses went up into the mount of God.

— First mention of the tablets in Exodus 24:12–13

The mount was covered by the cloud for six days, and on the seventh day Moses went into the midst of the cloud and was "in the mount forty days and forty nights." And Moses said, "the LORD delivered unto me two tablets of stone written with the finger of God; and on them was written according to all the words, which the LORD spake with you in the mount out of the midst of the fire in the day of the assembly." Before the full forty days expired, the children of Israel collectively decided that something had happened to Moses, and compelled Aaron to fashion a golden calf, and he "built an altar before it" and the people "worshipped" the calf.

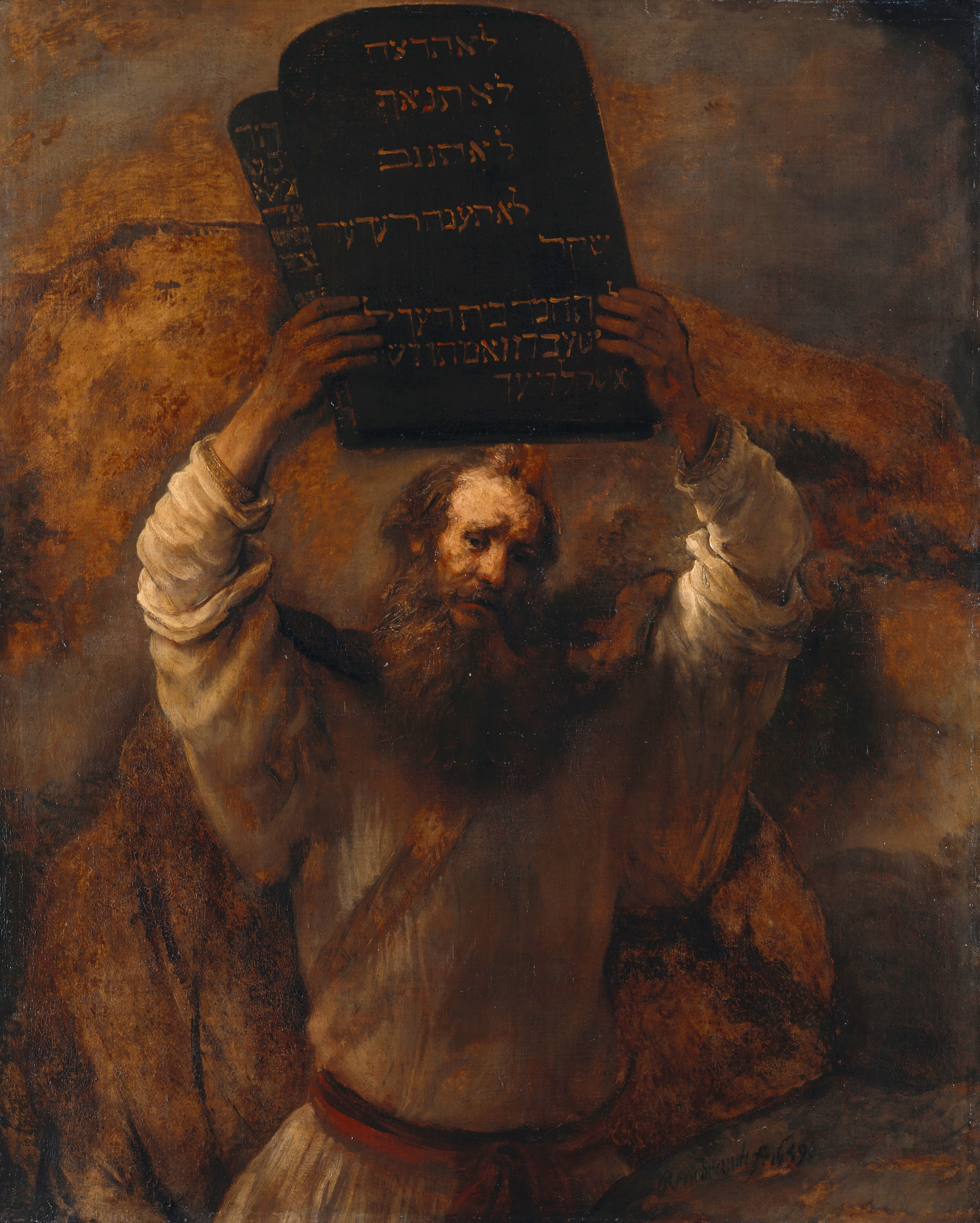
Moses Breaking the Tablets of the Law (1659) by Rembrandt

After the full forty days, Moses came down from the mountain with the Tablets of Stone: "And it came to pass, as soon as he came nigh unto the camp, that he saw the calf, and the dancing: and Moses' anger waxed hot, and he cast the tablets out of his hands, and brake them beneath the mount." After the events in chapters 32 and 33, the LORD told Moses, "Hew thee two tablets of stone like unto the first: and I will write upon these tablets the words that were in the first tablets, which thou brakest." "And he wrote on the tablets, according to the first writing, the ten commandments, which the LORD spake unto you in the mount out of the midst of the fire in the day of the assembly: and the LORD gave them unto me." These tablets were later placed in the Ark of the Covenant.

== Commandments text and numbering ==
=== Religious traditions ===
Surviving Hebrew manuscripts from before the seventh century, such as the Dead Sea Scrolls, format the text of the commandments as a single seamless flow of prose together with its context.

The commandments begin in the first (rightmost) column, on the bottom line, at the third word (from the right):

...אנוכי יהוה אלוהיך אשר
'I am the Lord your God who...'.

They continue through to the end of the third column (from the right):

שורו וחמרו וכול אשר לרעך...
'...his ox, his donkey or anything which is your neighbour's'.

While there are occasionally large gaps between words which seem to be to justify the shape of the column, they cannot be closed portion breaks, because they are found in grammatically nonsensical places, such in the third column on the second line:

...כמוך וזכרתה כי עבד היית בארץ מצרים ויציאך...
'...like you. Remember that you were a slave in the land of Egypt and he removed you...'

From the last such space to the end includes nearly half the commands together, everything from

...למען יאריכון ימיך...
'...so that your days will be prolonged...'

until the end. Since the text elaborates on some commands more than others, it contains far more than ten grammatical sentences. Due to this, the originally intended way of grouping them into ten enumerable commands is not obvious from the text itself. Since then, various traditions have emerged which divide the same text into ten in different ways.

By the tenth century, the Masoretic Text had established consistent formatting for the Hebrew text which has closed portion breaks (similar in appearance to a tab character in the middle of a line) that correspond to the Lutheran divisions in the chart below.

Translations into other languages, both before and after the Masoretic Text, are generally arranged on the page according to the style of the target language, without preserving the layout of whatever Hebrew they are working from. So, for example, Modern English Bible translations tend to arrange the text into the familiar notion of paragraphs, and two different translators may put paragraph breaks in different places, with or without attempting to satisfy the number ten.

Different religious traditions categorize the seventeen verses of Exodus 20:1–17 and their parallels in Deuteronomy 5:4–21 into ten commandments in different ways as shown in the table. Some suggest that the number ten is a choice to aid memorization rather than a matter of theology.

(Note: Place the cursor over the symbol keys in the upper left of the table below to reveal the full name, e.g. LXX is the Septuagint.)

The Ten Commandments
LXX	P	R	T	S	A	C	L	Commandment (KJV)	Exodus 20:1–17		Deuteronomy 5:4–21	
LXX	P	R	T	S	A	C	L	Commandment (KJV)	Verses	Text	Verses	Text
—	—	(0)	1	—	—	1	—	I am the Lord thy God	2		6	
1	1	1	2	1	1	1	1	Thou shalt have no other gods before me	3		7	
2	2	2	2	1	1	1	1	Thou shalt not make unto thee any graven image	4–6		8–10	
3	3	3	3	2	2	2	2	Thou shalt not take the name of the Lord thy God in vain	7		11	
4	4	4	4	3	3	3	3	Remember the sabbath day, to keep it holy	8–11			
4	4	4	4	3	3	3	3	Observe the sabbath day, to keep it holy			12–15	
5	5	5	5	4	4	4	4	Honour thy father and thy mother	12		16	
6	8	6	6	5	5	5	5	Thou shalt not murder	13		17	
7	6	7	7	6	6	6	6	Thou shalt not commit adultery	14		18	
8	7	8	8	7	7	7	7	Thou shalt not steal	15		19	
9	9	9	9	8	8	8	8	Thou shalt not bear false witness against thy neighbour	16		20	
10	10	10	10	9	10	10	9	Thou shalt not covet thy neighbour's house	17a			
10	10	10	10	9	10	10	9	Thou shalt not desire thy neighbour's house			21b	
10	10	10	10	9	9	9	10	Thou shalt not covet thy neighbour's wife...	17b		21a	
10	10	10	10	9	10	10	10	...or his slaves, or his animals, or anything of thy neighbour	17c		21c	
—	—	—	—	10	—	—	—	You shall set up these stones, which I command you today, on [Mount] Ārgarizem	13d		17d	

=== Categorization ===
There are two major approaches to categorizing the commandments. One approach distinguishes the prohibition against other gods (verse 3) from the prohibition against images (verses 4–6):

- LXX: Septuagint (3rd century BC), generally followed by Eastern Orthodox Christians.
- R: Reformed Christians follow Calvin's Institutes (1536) which follows the Septuagint; this system is also in the Anglican Book of Common Prayer.

Another approach combines verses 3–6, the prohibition against images and the prohibition against other gods, into a single command while still maintaining ten commandments. Samaritan and Jewish traditions include another commandment, whereas Christian traditions will divide coveting the neighbor's wife and house.

- P: The works of Philo are mostly allegorical interpretations of the Torah (known in the Hellenic world as the Ashburnham Pentateuch) but also include histories and comments on philosophy.
- T: Jewish Talmud (c. 200 AD), makes the "prologue" the first "saying" or "matter".
- S: Samaritan Pentateuch (c. 120 BC), contains additional instruction to Moses about making a sacrifice to Yahweh, which Samaritans regard as the 10th commandment.
- A: Augustine (4th century), combines verses 3–6 into a single commandment, similar to the grouping found in the Talmud, but omits the prologue as a commandment and divides the prohibition on coveting into two commandments, following the word order of Deuteronomy 5:21 rather than Exodus 20:17.
- C: Catholicism largely follows Augustine, which was reiterated in the Catechism of the Catholic Church (1992) changing "the sabbath" into "the lord's day" and dividing Exodus 20:17, prohibiting covetousness, into two commandments, in order to fulfill the number 10.
- L: Lutherans follow Luther's Large Catechism (1529), which follows Augustine and Catholic tradition but subordinates the prohibition of images to the sovereignty of God in the First Commandment and uses the word order of Exodus 20:17 rather than Deuteronomy 5:21 for the ninth and tenth commandments.

== Religious interpretations ==
The Ten Commandments are written with room for varying interpretation, reflecting their role as a summary of fundamental principles. They are not as explicit or as detailed as rules or as many other biblical laws and commandments, because they provide guiding principles that apply universally, across changing circumstances. They do specify severe punishments for their violation. Their precise import must be worked out in each separate situation.

The Bible indicates the special status of the Ten Commandments among all other Torah laws in several ways:

- They have a uniquely terse style.
- Of all the biblical laws and commandments, the Ten Commandments alone are said to have been "written with the finger of God" (Exodus 31:18).
- The stone tablets were placed in the Ark of the Covenant (Exodus 25:21, Deuteronomy 10:2,5).

=== Judaism ===
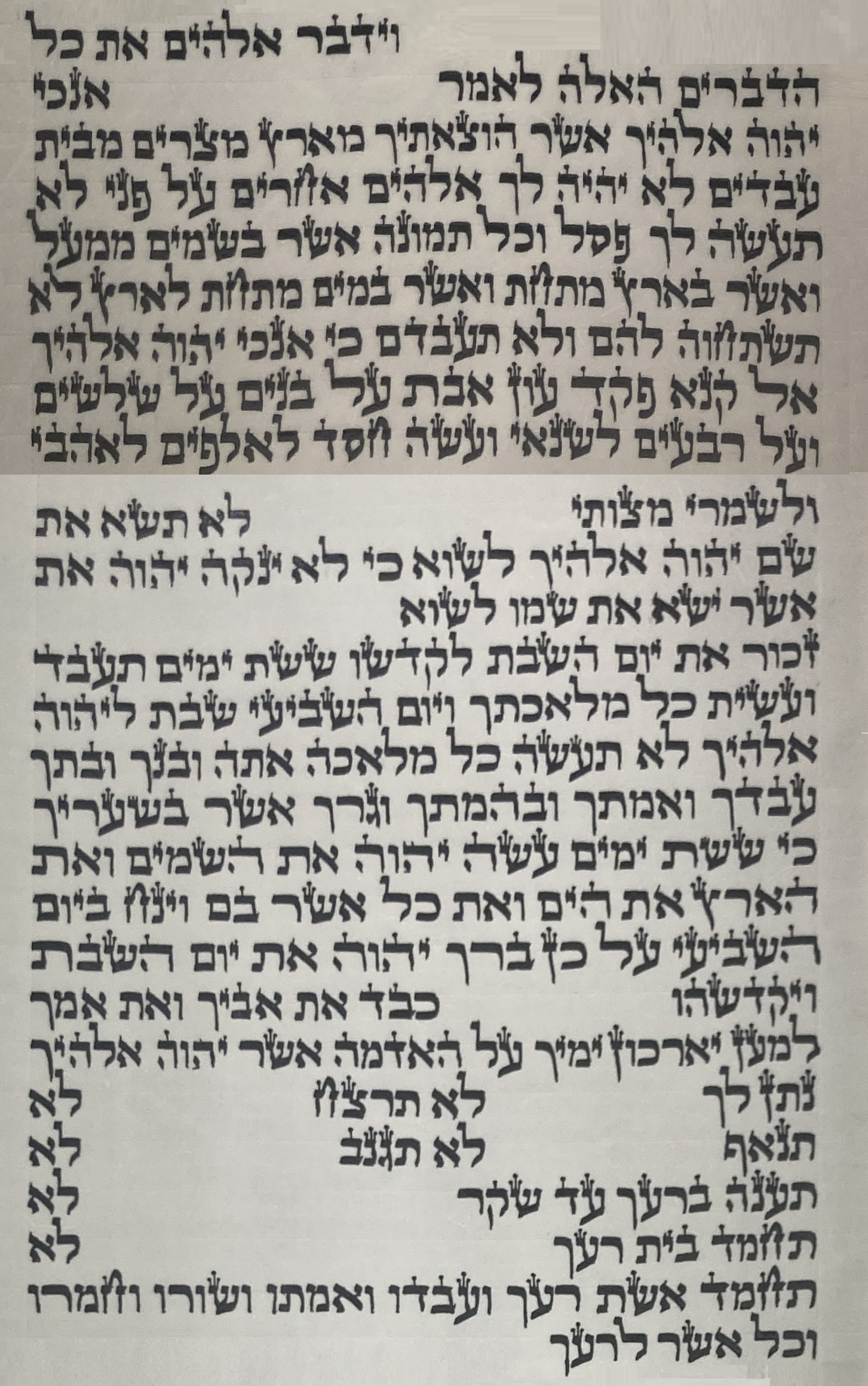
The Ten Commandments as they appear in a Torah scroll

The Ten Commandments form the basis of Jewish Rabbinic law, stating God's universal and timeless standard of right and wrong – unlike the rest of the 613 commandments which Jewish interpretative tradition claims are in the Torah, which include, for example, various duties and ceremonies such as various halachich kashrut dietary laws, and the rituals to be performed by priests in the Holy Temple. Jewish tradition considers the Ten Commandments the theological basis for the rest of the commandments. Philo, in his four-book work The Special Laws, treated the Ten Commandments as headings under which he discussed other related commandments. Similarly, in The Decalogue he stated that "under [the commandment against adulterers] many other commands are conveyed by implication, such as that against seducers, that against practisers of unnatural crimes, that against all who live in debauchery, that against all men who indulge in illicit and incontinent connections". Others, such as Rabbi Saadia Gaon, have also made groupings of the commandments according to their links with the Ten Commandments.

According to Conservative Rabbi Louis Ginzberg, the Ten Commandments are virtually entwined, in that the breaking of one leads to the breaking of another. Echoing an earlier rabbinic comment found in the commentary of Rashi to the Song of Songs (4:5) Ginzberg explained—there is also a great bond of union between the first five commandments and the last five. The first commandment: "I am the Lord, thy God", corresponds to the sixth: "Thou shalt not murder", for the murderer slays the image of God. The second: "Thou shalt have no strange gods before me", corresponds to the seventh: "Thou shalt not commit adultery", for conjugal faithlessness is as grave a sin as idolatry, which is faithlessness to God. The third commandment: "Thou shalt not take the name of the Lord in vain", corresponds to the eighth: "Thou shalt not steal", for stealing results in a false oath in God's name. The fourth: "Remember the Sabbath day, to keep it holy", corresponds to the ninth: "Thou shalt not bear false witness against thy neighbor", for he who bears false witness against his neighbor commits as grave a sin as if he had borne false witness against God, saying that He had not created the world in six days and rested on the seventh day (the holy Sabbath). The fifth commandment: "Honor thy father and thy mother", corresponds to the tenth: "Covet not thy neighbor's wife", for one who indulges this lust produces children who will not honor their true father, but will consider a stranger their father.

The traditional Rabbinical Jewish belief is that the observance of these commandments and the other mitzvot are required solely of the Jewish people and that the laws incumbent on humanity in general are outlined in the seven Noahide laws, a concept that is not found anywhere in the Tanakh, several of which overlap with the Ten Commandments. In the era of the Sanhedrin transgressing any one of six of the Ten Commandments theoretically carried the death penalty, the exceptions being the First Commandment, honouring your father and mother, saying God's name in vain, and coveting, though this was rarely enforced due to a large number of stringent evidentiary requirements imposed by the oral law.

==== Two tablets ====
The arrangement of the commandments on the two tablets is interpreted in different ways in the classical Jewish tradition. Rabbi Hanina ben Gamaliel says that each tablet contained five commandments, "but the Sages say ten on one tablet and ten on the other", that is, that the tablets were duplicates. This can be compared to diplomatic treaties of the ancient Near East, in which a copy was made for each party.

According to the Talmud, the compendium of traditional Rabbinic Jewish law, tradition, and interpretation, one interpretation of the biblical verse "the tablets were written on both their sides", is that the carving went through the full thickness of the tablets, yet was miraculously legible from both sides.

==== Use in Jewish ritual ====
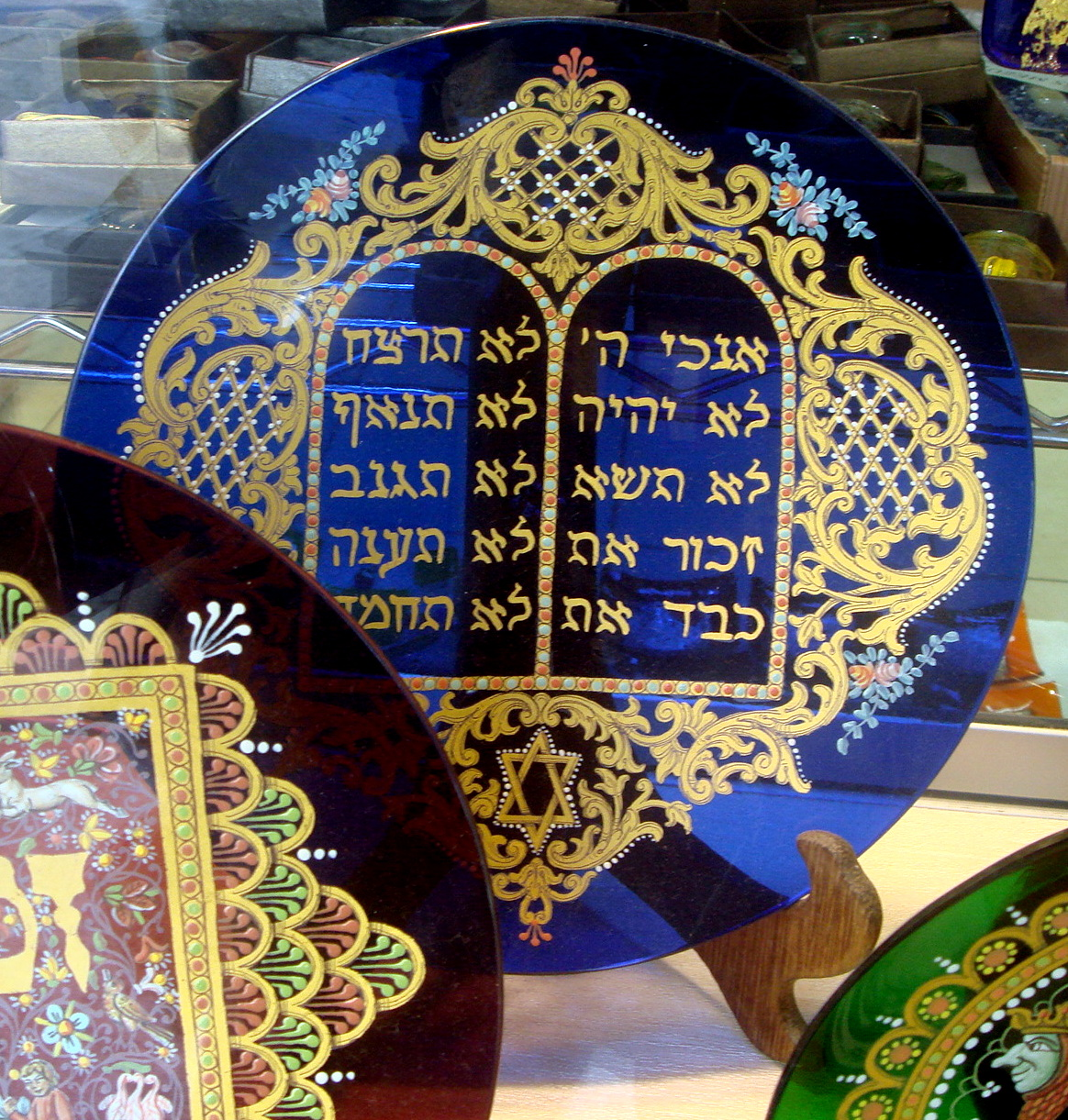
The Ten Commandments on a glass plate

The Mishna records that during the period of the Second Temple, the Ten Commandments were recited daily, before the reading of the Shema Yisrael (as preserved, for example, in the Nash Papyrus, a Hebrew manuscript fragment from 150–100 BC found in Egypt, containing a version of the Ten Commandments and the beginning of the Shema); but that this practice was abolished in the synagogues so as not to give ammunition to heretics who claimed that they were the only important part of Jewish law, or to dispel a claim by early Christians that only the Ten Commandments were handed down at Mount Sinai rather than the whole Torah.

In later centuries rabbis continued to omit the Ten Commandments from daily liturgy in order to prevent confusion among Jews that they are only bound by the Ten Commandments, and not also by many other biblical and Talmudic laws, such as the requirement to observe holy days other than the sabbath.

However, some rabbinic authorities still recommend reading the Ten Commandments privately as part of unscheduled, non-communal prayer. The Ten Commandments are included in some prayerbooks for this purpose.

Today, the Ten Commandments are heard in the synagogue three times a year: as they come up during the readings of Exodus and Deuteronomy, and during the festival of Shavuot. The Exodus version is read in parashat Yitro around late January–February, and on the festival of Shavuot, and the Deuteronomy version in parashat Va'etchanan in August–September. In some traditions, worshipers rise for the reading of the Ten Commandments to highlight their special significance though many rabbis, including Maimonides, have opposed this custom since one may come to think that the Ten Commandments are more important than the rest of the mitzvot.

In printed Chumashim, as well as in those in manuscript form, the Ten Commandments carry two sets of cantillation marks. The ta'am 'elyon (upper accentuation), which makes each Commandment into a separate verse, is used for public Torah reading, while the ta'am tachton (lower accentuation), which divides the text into verses of more even length, is used for private reading or study. The verse numbering in the Torah follows the ta'am tachton. In the Torah, the references to the Ten Commandments are therefore Exodus 20:2–14 and Deuteronomy 5:6–18.

==== Samaritan ====
The Samaritan Pentateuch varies in the Ten Commandments passages, both in that the Samaritan Deuteronomical version of the passage is much closer to that in Exodus, and in that Samaritans count as nine commandments what others count as ten. The Samaritan tenth commandment is on the sanctity of Mount Gerizim.

The text of the Samaritan tenth commandment follows:

And it shall come to pass when the Lord thy God will bring thee into the land of the Canaanites whither thou goest to take possession of it, thou shalt erect unto thee large stones, and thou shalt cover them with lime, and thou shalt write upon the stones all the words of this Law, and it shall come to pass when ye cross the Jordan, ye shall erect these stones which I command thee upon Mount Gerizim, and thou shalt build there an altar unto the Lord thy God, an altar of stones, and thou shalt not lift upon them iron, of perfect stones shalt thou build thine altar, and thou shalt bring upon it burnt offerings to the Lord thy God, and thou shalt sacrifice peace offerings, and thou shalt eat there and rejoice before the Lord thy God. That mountain is on the other side of the Jordan at the end of the road towards the going down of the sun in the land of the Canaanites who dwell in the Arabah facing Gilgal close by Elon Moreh facing Shechem.

=== Christianity ===
Most traditions of Christianity hold that the Ten Commandments have divine authority and continue to be valid, though they have different interpretations and uses of them. The Apostolic Constitutions, which implore believers to "always remember the ten commands of God," reveal the importance of the Decalogue in the early Church. Through most of Christian history the decalogue was considered a summary of God's law and standard of behaviour, central to Christian life, piety, and worship.

Distinctions in the order and importance of said order continues to be a theological debate, with texts within the New Testament Romans 13:9 confirming the more traditional ordering, which follows the Septuagint of adultery, murder and theft, as opposed to the currently held order of the Masoretic of murder, adultery, theft.

Protestantism, under which there are several denominations of Christianity, in general gives more importance to biblical law and the gospel. Magisterial Protestantism takes the Ten Commandments as the starting point of Christian moral life. Different versions of Christianity have varied in how they have translated the bare principles into the specifics that make up a full Christian ethic.

==== References in the New Testament ====
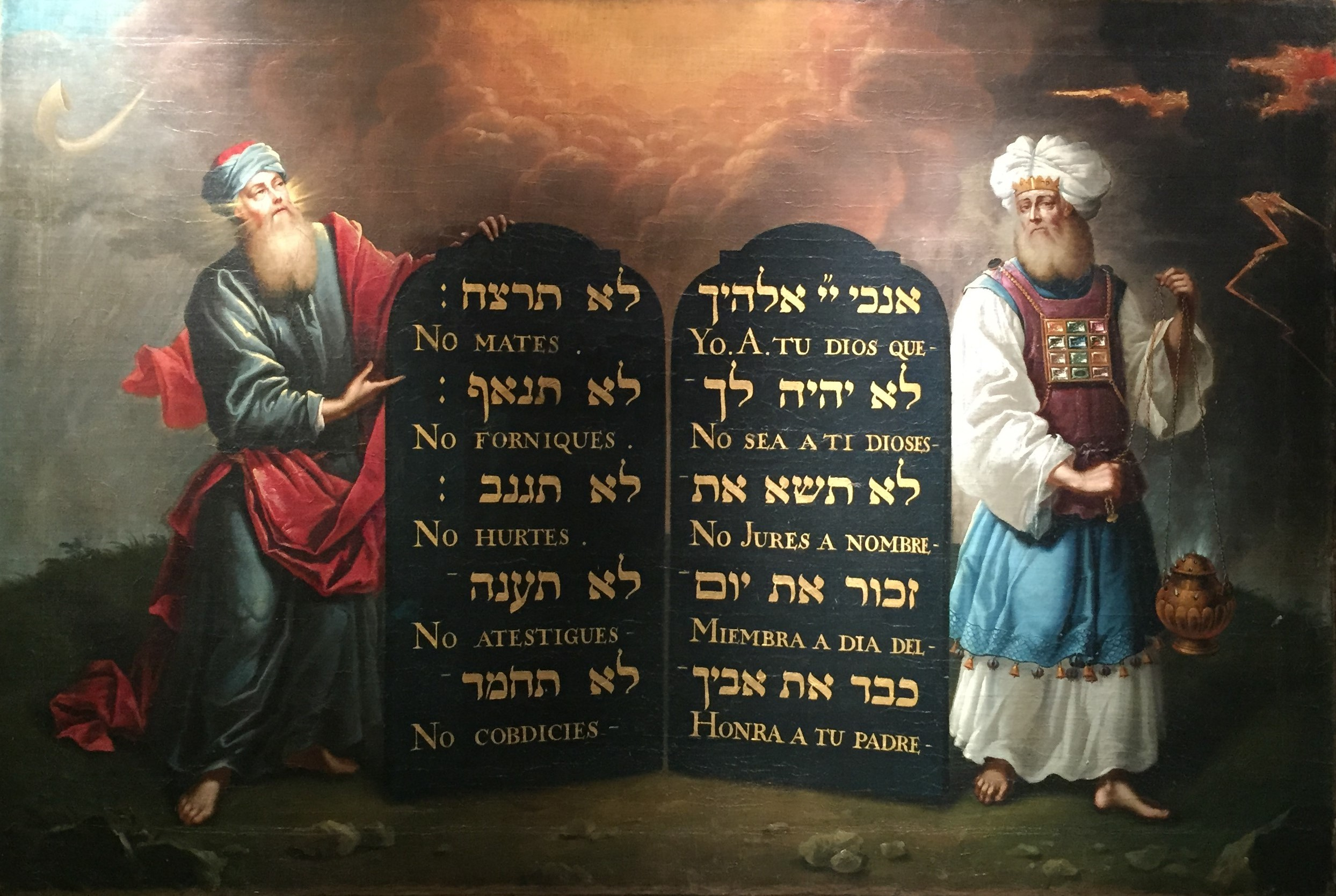
Moses and Aaron with the Ten Commandments (painting c. 1675 by Aron de Chavez)

During his Sermon on the Mount, Jesus explicitly referenced the prohibitions against murder and adultery. In Matthew 19:16–19 Jesus repeated five of the Ten Commandments, followed by that commandment called "the second" (Matthew 22:34–40) after the first and great commandment.

And, behold, one came and said unto him, Good Master, what good thing shall I do, that I may have eternal life? And he said unto him, Why callest thou me good? There is none good but one, that is, God: but if thou wilt enter into life, keep the commandments. He saith unto him, Which? Jesus said, Thou shalt do no murder, Thou shalt not commit adultery, Thou shalt not steal, Thou shalt not bear false witness, Honour thy father and thy mother: and, Thou shalt love thy neighbour as thyself.

— Matthew 19:16–19

In his Epistle to the Romans, Paul the Apostle also mentioned five of the Ten Commandments and associated them with the neighbourly love commandment.

Owe no man any thing, but to love one another: for he that loveth another hath fulfilled the law. For this, Thou shalt not commit adultery, Thou shalt not kill, Thou shalt not steal, Thou shalt not bear false witness, Thou shalt not covet; and if there be any other commandment, it is briefly comprehended in this saying, namely, Thou shalt love thy neighbour as thyself. Love worketh no ill to his neighbour: therefore love is the fulfilling of the law.

— Romans 13:8–10 KJV

==== Anglicanism ====
In Anglicanism, the Articles of the Church of England, revised and altered by the Assembly of Divines, at Westminster, in the year 1643 state that "no Christian man whatsoever is free from the obedience of the commandments which are called moral. By the moral law, we understand all the Ten Commandments taken in their full extent."

==== Baptists ====
Baptists believe The Ten Commandments are a summary of the requirements of a works covenant (called the "Old Covenant"), given on Mount Sinai to the nascent nation of Israel. The Old Covenant is fulfilled by Christ at the cross. Unbelievers are still under the Law. The law reveals man's sin and need for the salvation that is Jeshua (Jesus). Repentance from sin and faith in Christ for salvation is the point of the entire Bible. They do reflect the eternal character of God, and serve as a paragon of morality.

==== Catholicism ====
In Catholicism it is believed that Jesus freed Christians from the rest of Jewish religious law, but not from their obligation to keep the Ten Commandments. It has been said that they are to the moral order what the creation story is to the natural order.

According to the Catechism of the Catholic Church—the official exposition of the Catholic Church's Christian beliefs—the Commandments are considered essential for spiritual good health and growth, and serve as the basis for social justice. Church teaching of the Commandments is largely based on the Old and New Testaments and the writings of the early Church Fathers. The Catechism of the Catholic Church believes that in the New Testament, Jesus acknowledged their validity summarizing them into two "Great Commandments".

The Great Commandments contain the Law of the Gospel, summed up in the Golden Rule. The Law of the Gospel is expressed particularly in the Sermon on the Mount. The Catechism of the Catholic Church explains that, "the Law of the Gospel fulfills the commandments of the Law. The Lord's Sermon on the Mount, far from abolishing or devaluing the moral prescriptions of the Old Law, releases their hidden potential and has new demands arise from them: it reveals their entire divine and human truth. It does not add new external precepts, but proceeds to reform the heart, the root of human acts, where man chooses between the pure and the impure, where faith, hope, and charity are formed and with them the other virtues." The New Law "fulfills, refines, surpasses, and leads the Old Law to its perfection".

==== Lutheranism ====
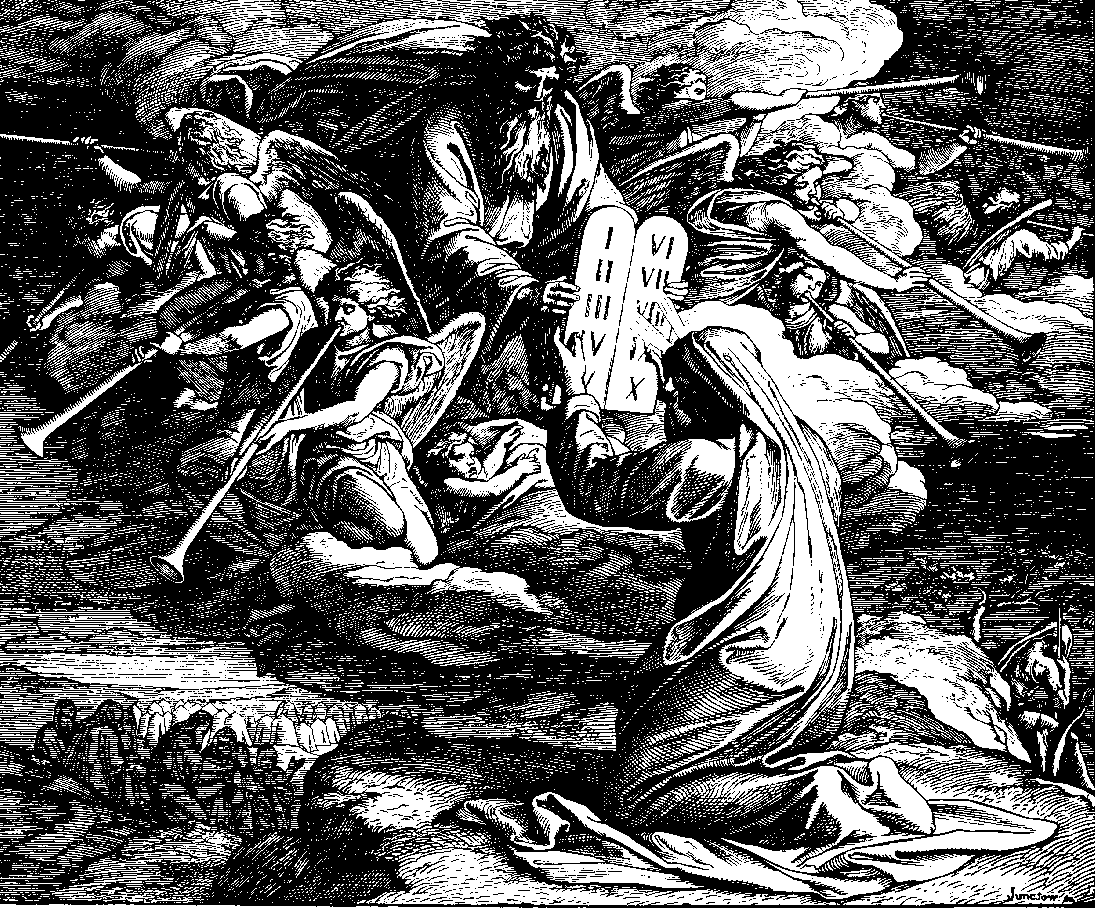
Moses receives the Ten Commandments in this 1860 woodcut by Julius Schnorr von Carolsfeld, a Lutheran.

The Lutheran churches divide Mosaic Law into three components: the (1) moral law, (2) civil law, (3) ceremonial law. Of these, the moral law as contained in the Ten Commandments remains in force today.

The Lutheran division of the commandments follows the one established by St. Augustine, following the then current synagogue scribal division. The first three commandments govern the relationship between God and humans, the fourth through eighth govern public relationships between people, and the last two govern private thoughts. See Luther's Small Catechism and Large Catechism.

==== Methodism ====
The moral law contained in the Ten Commandments, according to the founder of the Methodist movement John Wesley, was instituted from the beginning of the world and is written on the hearts of all people. As with the Reformed view, Wesley held that the moral law, which is contained in the Ten Commandments, stands today:

Every part of this law must remain in force upon all mankind in all ages, as not depending either on time or place, nor on any other circumstances liable to change; but on the nature of God and the nature of man, and their unchangeable relation to each other.

— John Wesley, Sermons, Vol. I, Sermon 25.

In keeping with Wesleyan covenant theology, "while the ceremonial law was abolished in Christ and the whole Mosaic dispensation itself was concluded upon the appearance of Christ, the moral law remains a vital component of the covenant of grace, having Christ as its perfecting end". As such, in Methodism, an "important aspect of the pursuit of sanctification is the careful following" of the Ten Commandments.

==== Orthodox ====
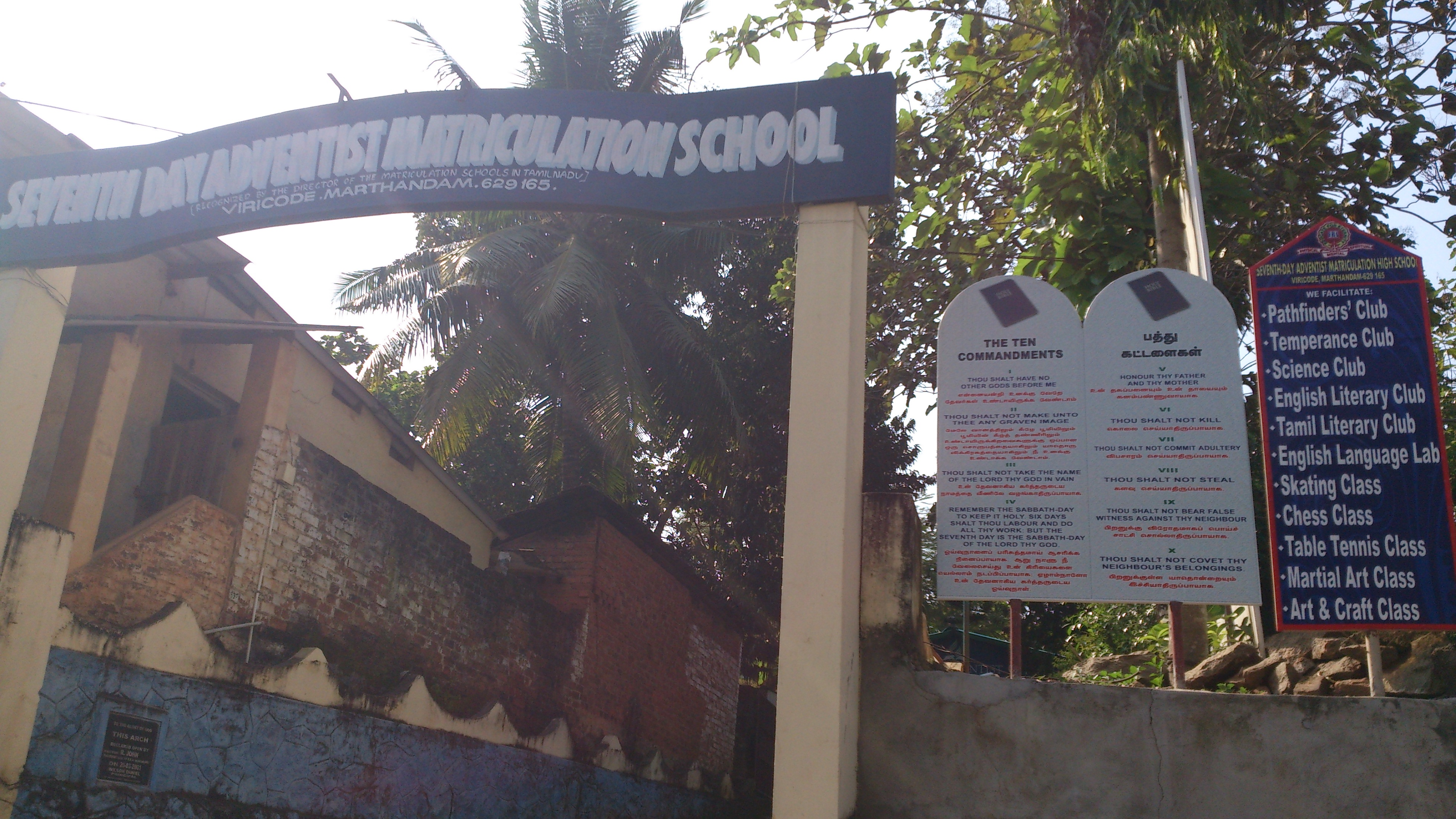
A Christian school in India displays the Ten Commandments.

The Eastern Orthodox Church holds its moral truths to be chiefly contained in the Ten Commandments. A confession begins with the Confessor reciting the Ten Commandments and asking the penitent which of them he has broken.

==== Pentecostalism ====
The Pentecostal Christianity believes the Ten Commandments were given directly from God summarizing the absolutes of spiritual and moral living that God intended for his people. They also attach a specific significance observing that the Feast of Pentecost commemorates the giving of the Ten Commandments to Moses. This view, admitted by several founders of the Pentecostal Church has passed into modern Christian ethic, where the feast is also celebrated as "the day of the giving of the Law" or Shavuot as observed by Judaic liturgical books and Jewish Christianity. Pentecostals believe giving of the Ten Commandments on Mount Sinai fifty days after Passover and the disciples of Jesus Christ receiving the Holy Spirit of God, as foretold by Him, fifty days after His Resurrection on Day of Pentecost was foretold by the prophet Jeremiah symbolizing God giving His Church the gift of the Holy Spirit, where law is written, not on tablets of stone, but in their hearts. Pentecostal Christianity believes that through Jesus Christ and with the exception of the Ten Commandments, they are not bound by the 613 Commandments of the Old Testament and any adherence to Judaic Halakha.

==== Reformed Christianity ====
Reformed Christianity includes the Continental Reformed, Presbyterian, Congregationalist, and Reformed Anglican traditions. The Heidelberg Catechism, in explaining the third use of the Law, teaches that the moral law as contained in the Ten Commandments is binding for Christians and that it instructs Christians how to live in service to God in gratitude for His grace shown in redeeming mankind. John Calvin deemed this third use of the Law as its primary use.

===== Presbyterianism =====
The Westminster Confession, held by Presbyterian churches, holds that the moral law contained in the Ten Commandments "does forever bind all, as well justified persons as others, to the obedience thereof".

==== Dispensationalism ====
With the emergence of dispensationalism (held to by churches such as the Plymouth Brethren and certain Independent Baptists), certain communities believe and teach their adherents that all of the Law of Moses was fulfilled by Jesus Christ by His Crucifixion, death and resurrection and the Law of Moses including the Ten Commandments no longer apply to them while others believe in following only the commandments that appear in the New Testament and hence do not follow or observe them as part of their faith and worship.

==== The Church of Jesus Christ of Latter-day Saints ====
According to the doctrine of the Church of Jesus Christ of Latter-day Saints, Jesus completed rather than rejected the Mosaic law. The Ten Commandments are considered eternal gospel principles necessary for exaltation. They appear in the Book of Mosiah 12:34–36, 13:15–16, 13:21–24 and Doctrine and Covenants. According to the Book of Mosiah, a prophet named Abinadi taught the Ten Commandments in the court of King Noah and was martyred for his righteousness. Abinadi knew the Ten Commandments from the brass plates.

In an October 2011 address, the Church president and prophet Thomas S. Monson taught "The Ten Commandments are just that—commandments. They are not suggestions." In that same talk he used small quotations listing the numbering and selection of the commandments. This and other sources do not include the prologue, making it most consistent with the Septuagint numbering.

A splinter group of the Church called the "Church of Jesus Christ of Latter Day Saints (Strangite)" have a belief similar to the Samaritans where they have the entire Ten Commandments in their scripture where others only have nine. The Strangite fourth Commandment is "Thou shalt love thy neighbor as thyself." The Strangite's founder and namesake James Strang wrote in "Note on the Decalogue" as part of the Book of the Law of the Lord (a Strangite holy book) that no other version of the Decalogue contains more than nine commandments and speculated that his fourth Commandment was omitted from other works perhaps as early as Josephus' time (circa 37–100 AD).

The Strangite Ten Commandments are as follows.

1. Thou shalt love the Lord thy God with all thy heart, and with all thy might, and with all thy strength.
2. Thou shalt not take the name of the Lord thy God in vain.
3. Remember the Sabbath day, to keep it holy. Six days shalt thou labour, and do all thy work, but the seventh day is the Sabbath of the Lord thy God: in it thou shalt not do any work; thou, nor thy son, nor thy daughter, nor thy manservant, nor thy womanservant, nor thy cattle, nor the stranger that is within thy gates.
4. Thou shalt love thy neighbor as thyself.
5. Honour thy father and thy mother.
6. Thou shalt not kill.
7. Thou shalt not commit adultery.
8. Thou shalt not steal.
9. Thou shalt not bear false witness.
10. Thou shalt not covet thy neighbour's inheritance.

=== Islam ===
==== Moses and the Tablets ====
The receiving of the Ten Commandments by Prophet Musa (Moses) is dealt with in much detail in Islamic tradition with the meeting of Moses with God on Mount Sinai described in Surah A'raf (7:142–145). The Revealing of the Tablets on which were the Commandments of God is described in the following verse:

And We wrote for him (Moses) on the Tablets the lesson to be drawn from all things and the explanation of all things (and said): Hold unto these with firmness, and enjoin your people to take the better therein. I shall show you the home of Al-Fasiqun (the rebellious, disobedient to Allah).

The Tablets are further alluded to in verses 7:150, when Moses threw the Tablets down in anger at seeing the Israelites' worshipping of the golden calf, and in 7:154 when he picked up the Tablets having recovered from his anger:

And when the anger of Musa (Moses) was appeased, he took up the Tablets, and in their inscription was guidance and mercy for those who fear their Lord.

==== Classical views ====
Three verses of Surah An'am (6:151–153) are widely taken to be a reinstatement (or revised version) of the Ten Commandments either as revealed to Moses originally or as they are to be taken by Muslims now:

151. Say: "Come, I will recite what your Lord has prohibited you from: ^{1}Join not anything in worship with Him; ^{2}And be good (and dutiful) to your parents; ^{3}And kill not your children because of poverty – We provide sustenance for you and for them; ^{4}And come not near to Al-Fawahish (shameful sins, illegal sexual intercourse, adultery etc.) whether committed openly or secretly, ^{5}And kill not anyone whom Allah has forbidden, except for a just cause (according to the Law). This He has commanded you that you may understand.

152. "^{6}And come not near to the orphan's property, except to improve it, until he (or she) attains the age of full strength; ^{7}And give full measure and full weight with justice. We burden not any person, but that which he can bear. ^{8}And whenever you give your word (i.e. judge between men or give evidence, etc.), say the truth even if a near relative is concerned, ^{9}And fulfill the Covenant of Allah. This He commands you, that you may remember.

153. "^{10}And verily, this (the Commandments mentioned in the above Verses) is my Straight Path, so follow it, and follow not (other) paths, for they will separate you away from His Path. This He has ordained for you that you may become Al-Muttaqun (the pious)."

Evidence for these verses having some relation to Moses and the Ten Commandments is from the verse which immediately follows them:

Then, We gave Musa (Moses) the Book, to complete (Our Favour) upon those who would do right, and explaining all things in detail and a guidance and a mercy that they might believe in the meeting with their Lord.

According to a narration in Mustadrak Hakim, Ibn Abbas, a prominent narrator of Israiliyat traditions said, "In Surah Al-An`am, there are clear Ayat, and they are the Mother of the Book (the Qur'an)." He then recited the above verses.

Also in Mustadrak Hakim is the narration of Ubada ibn as-Samit:

The Messenger of Allah said, "Who among you will give me his pledge to do three things?"

He then recited the (above) Ayah (6:151–153).

He then said, "Whoever fulfills (this pledge), then his reward will be with Allah, but whoever fell into shortcomings and Allah punishes him for it in this life, then that will be his recompense. Whoever Allah delays (his reckoning) until the Hereafter, then his matter is with Allah. If He wills, He will punish him, and if He wills, He will forgive him."

Ibn Kathir mentions a narration of Abdullah ibn Mas'ud in his Tafsir:

"Whoever wishes to read the will and testament of the Messenger of Allah on which he placed his seal, let him read these Ayat (6:151–153)."

Order	Commandment in the Quran	Surat Al-An'am	Surat Al-Isra	Corresponding in the Bible
First Commandment	Do not associate others with God	(151)	(22)	Do not put other gods before me
Second Commandment	Honour your parents	(151)	(23–24)	Honour thy father and thy mother
Third Commandment	Do not kill your children for fear of poverty	(151)	(26–31)	Do not murder
Fourth Commandment	Do not come near indecencies, openly or secretly.	(151)	(32)	Do not covet thy neighbour's wife, Do not commit adultery
Fifth Commandment	Do not take a life except justly	(151)	(33)	Do not murder
Sixth Commandment	Do not come near the property of the orphan except to enhance it	(152)	(34)	Do not covet his slaves, or his animals, or anything of thy neighbour
Seventh Commandment	Give full measure and weigh with justice	(152)	(35)	Thou shalt not steal. (And the biblical "Remember the sabbath day" is absent in the Quran.)
Eighth Commandment	Whenever you testify, maintain justice even regarding a close relative	(152)	(36)	Do not bear false witness against thy neighbour
Ninth Commandment	Fulfil your covenant with God	(152)	(34)	Do not take the name of the Lord thy God in vain
Tenth Commandment	Follow God's path and not any other	(153)	(37–39)	Do not put other gods before me. Do not make unto thee any graven image or idols neither kneel before them nor worship them

=== Main points of interpretative difference ===
==== Sabbath day ====
The Abrahamic religions observe the Sabbath in various ways. In Judaism it is observed on Saturday (reckoned from dusk to dusk). In Christianity, it is usually observed on Sunday, sometimes observed on Saturday, and sometimes not at all (non-Sabbatarianism). Observing the Sabbath on Sunday, the day of resurrection, gradually became the dominant Christian practice from the Jewish-Roman wars onward. The Church's general repudiation of Jewish practices during this period is apparent in the Council of Laodicea (4th century AD) where Canons 37–38 state: "It is not lawful to receive portions sent from the feasts of Jews or heretics, nor to feast together with them" and "It is not lawful to receive unleavened bread from the Jews, nor to be partakers of their impiety". Canon 29 of the Laodicean council specifically refers to the sabbath: "Christians must not judaize by resting on the [Jewish] Sabbath, but must work on that day, rather honouring the Lord's Day; and, if they can, resting then as Christians. But if any shall be found to be judaizers, let them be anathema from Christ."

==== Killing or murder ====
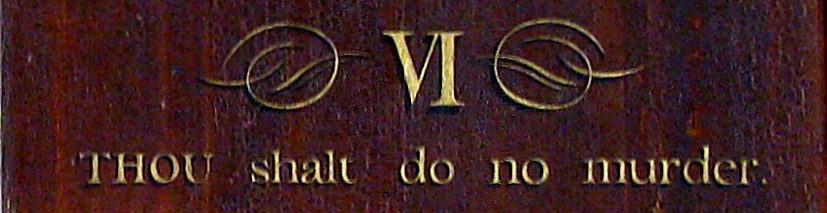
The Sixth Commandment, as translated by the Book of Common Prayer (1549). The image is from the altar screen of the Temple Church near the Law Courts in London.

Multiple translations exist of the fifth/sixth commandment; the Hebrew words לא תרצח (lo tirtzach) are variously translated as "thou shalt not kill" or "thou shalt not murder".

The imperative is against unlawful killing resulting in bloodguilt. The Hebrew Bible contains numerous prohibitions against unlawful killing, but does not prohibit killing in the context of warfare (1Kings 2:5–6), capital punishment (Leviticus 20:9–16) or defending against a home invasion (Exodus 22:2–3), which are considered justified. The New Testament is in agreement that murder is a grave moral evil, and references the Old Testament view of bloodguilt.

==== Theft ====
German Old Testament scholar Albrecht Alt: Das Verbot des Diebstahls im Dekalog (1953), suggested that the commandment translated as "thou shalt not steal" was originally intended against stealing people, against abductions and slavery, in agreement with the Talmudic interpretation of the statement as "thou shalt not kidnap" (Sanhedrin 86a).

Alt's claim is somewhat questionable, because the decalogue verse (Exodus 20:12, Deuteronomy 5:16) forbids theft in general, whereas the Sanhedrin 86a discussion (abductions and slavery) deals with another biblical verse: Deuteronomy 24:7 which explicitly refers to theft (i.e. abduction) of a person in order to sell that person.

==== Idolatry ====
In Judaism there is a prohibition against making or worshipping an idol or a representation of God, but there is no restriction on art or simple depictions unrelated to God. Islam has a stronger prohibition, banning not just representations of God, but also in some cases of Muhammad, humans and, in some interpretations, any living creature.

In the non-canonical Gospel of Barnabas, it is claimed that Jesus stated that idolatry is the greatest sin as it divests a man fully of faith, and hence of God. The words attributed to Jesus prohibit not only worshipping statues of wood or stone; but also statues of flesh. "...all which a man loves, for which he leaves everything else but that, is his god, thus the glutton and drunkard has for his idol his own flesh, the fornicator has for his idol the harlot and the greedy has for his idol silver and gold, and so the same for every other sinner." Idolatory was thus the basic sin, which manifested in various acts or thoughts, which displace the primacy of God. However, the Gospel of Barnabas does not form part of the Christian bible. It is known only from 16th- and 17th-century manuscripts, and frequently reflects Islamic rather than Christian understandings.

Eastern Orthodox tradition teaches that while images of God, the Father, remain prohibited, depictions of Jesus as the incarnation of God as a visible human are permissible. To emphasize the theological importance of the incarnation, the Orthodox Church encourages the use of icons in church and private devotions, but prefers a two-dimensional depiction. In modern use (usually as a result of Roman Catholic influence), more naturalistic images and images of the Father, however, also appear occasionally in Orthodox churches, but statues, i.e. three-dimensional depictions, continue to be banned.

==== Adultery ====
This commandment forbade male Israelites from having sexual intercourse with the wife of another Israelite; the prohibition did not extend to their own slaves. Sexual intercourse between an Israelite man, married or not, and a woman who was neither married nor betrothed was not considered adultery. This concept of adultery stems from a society that was not strictly monogamous, where the patriarchal economic aspect of Israelite marriage gave the husband an exclusive right to his wife, whereas the wife, as the husband's possession, did not have an exclusive right to her husband.

Louis Ginzberg argued that the tenth commandment (Covet not thy neighbor's wife) is directed against a sin which may lead to a trespassing of all Ten Commandments.

== Critical historical analysis ==
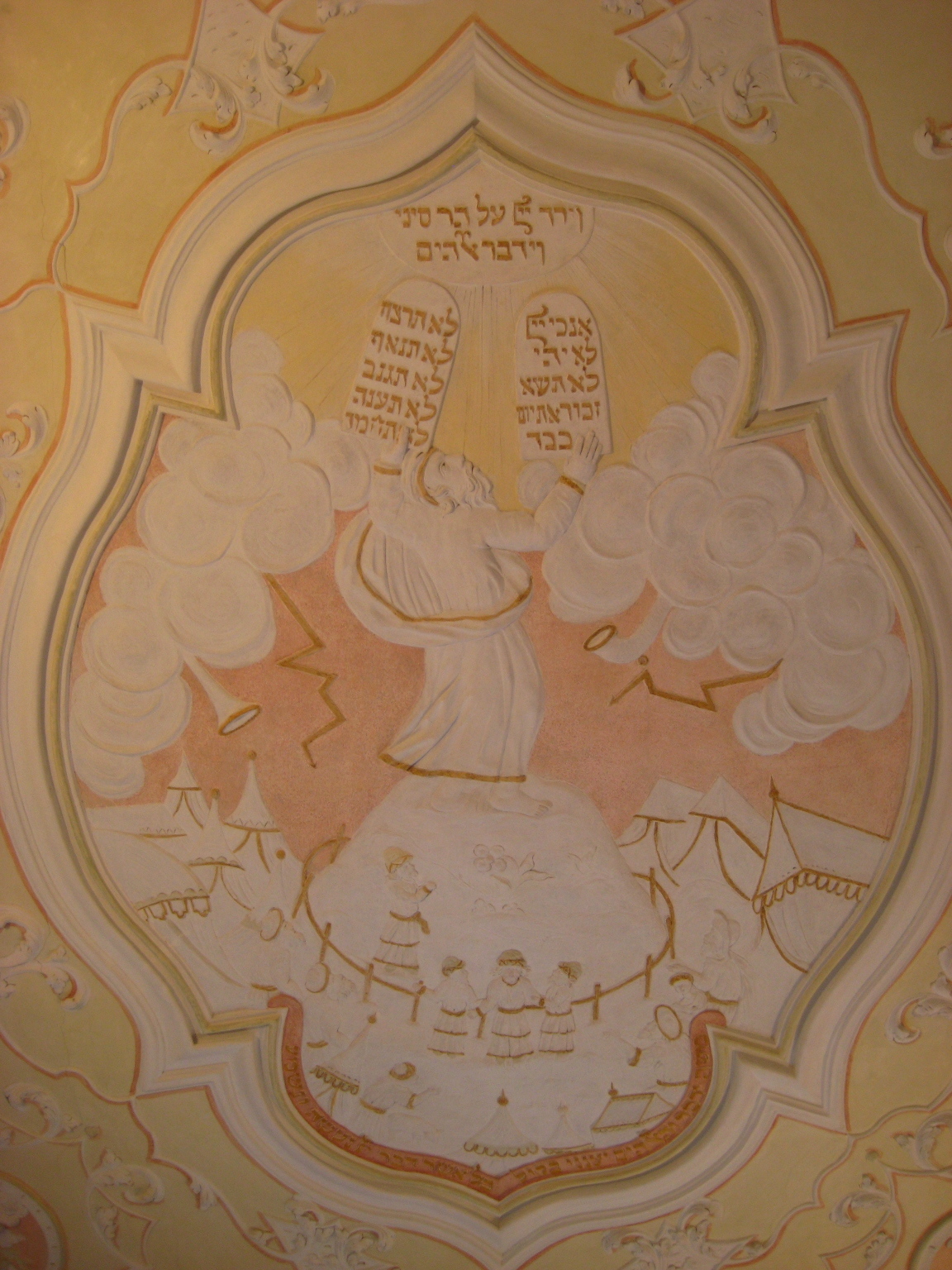
18th-century depiction of Moses receiving the tablets (Monheim Town Hall)

Scholars have proposed three main datings for the Decalogue—early Mosaic authorship during the Sinai period, a pre-exilic monarchic origin, or a postexilic composition influenced by deuteronomistic, priestly, prophetic, and wisdom traditions.

=== Early theories ===
Julius Wellhausen's documentary hypothesis (1883) suggests that Exodus 20–23 and 34 "might be regarded as the document which formed the starting point of the religious history of Israel." Deuteronomy 5 then reflects King Josiah's attempt to link the document produced by his court to the older Mosaic tradition.

Bernard Levinson argues that the idea of Exodus 34:11–26 as an ancient, independent, pre-Deuteronomic legal source originated with Goethe, significantly influenced Wellhausen’s formulation of the documentary hypothesis, and reflects broader intellectual currents, including Goethe’s construction of the Jew as the particularistic "other" in contrast to the universal German Protestant self.

=== 20th century discussion ===
According to John Bright, there was an important distinction between the Decalogue and the "book of the covenant" (Exodus 21–23 and 34:10–24). The Decalogue, he argues, was modelled on the suzerainty treaties of the Hittites (and other Mesopotamian Empires), that is, represents the relationship between God and Israel as a relationship between king and vassal, and enacts that bond.

"The prologue of the Hittite treaty reminds his vassals of his benevolent acts... (compare with Exodus 20:2 "I am the LORD your God, who brought you out of the land of Egypt, out of the house of slavery"). The Hittite treaty also stipulated the obligations imposed by the ruler on his vassals, which included a prohibition of relations with peoples outside the empire, or enmity between those within." (Exodus 20:3: "You shall have no other gods before Me"). Viewed as a treaty rather than a law code, its purpose is not so much to regulate human affairs as to define the scope of the king's power.

Julius Morgenstern argued that Exodus 34 was distinct from the Jahwist document, identifying it with king Asa's reforms in 899 BC. Bright, however, believes that like the Decalogue this text has its origins in the time of the tribal alliance. The book of the covenant, he notes, bears a greater similarity to Mesopotamian law codes (e.g. the Code of Hammurabi which was inscribed on a stone stele). He argues that the function of this "book" is to move from the realm of treaty to the realm of law: "The Book of the Covenant (Ex., chs. 21 to 23; cf. ch. 34), which is no official state law, but a description of normative Israelite judicial procedure in the days of the Judges, is the best example of this process." According to Bright, then, this body of law too predates the monarchy.

According to Yehezkel Kaufmann, the Decalogue and the book of the covenant represent two ways of manifesting God's presence in Israel: the Ten Commandments taking the archaic and material form of stone tablets kept in the Ark of the Covenant, while the book of the covenant took oral form to be recited to the people.

=== 21st century scholarship ===
Michael Coogan argues that each of the three versions of the Ten Commandments are "significantly different… indicating that its text was not fixed in ancient Israel."

Archaeologists Israel Finkelstein and Neil Asher Silberman argue that "the astonishing composition came together… in the seventh century BC". An even later date (after 586 BC) is suggested by David H. Aaron; his book argues for "the probability that these documents were written very late in the history of biblical literature - indeed, so late as to constitute a literary afterthought in the development of Israelite ethnic self-definition."

Biblical scholar Timothy S. Hogue argues that the Decalogue in the book of Exodus originated in the northern kingdom of Israel around the 9th-8th centuries BC, based on parallels with Luwian texts from that time as well as the references in the Decalogue to the masseboth which were destroyed during the religious reforms of Hezekiah and Josiah.

According to Book of Deuteronomy, the tablets were placed in the Ark of the Covenant. Thomas Römer argued in 2015 that "clearly… the tablets of the law are a substitute for something else." He holds that "the original Ark contained a statue [i.e. a cult image] of Yhwh" and that it was "brought into the Jerusalem temple under Josiah", which he specifically identifies as "two betyles (sacred stones), or two cult image statues symbolizing Yhwh and his female companion Ashera or a statue representing Yhwh alone."

=== The Ritual Decalogue ===
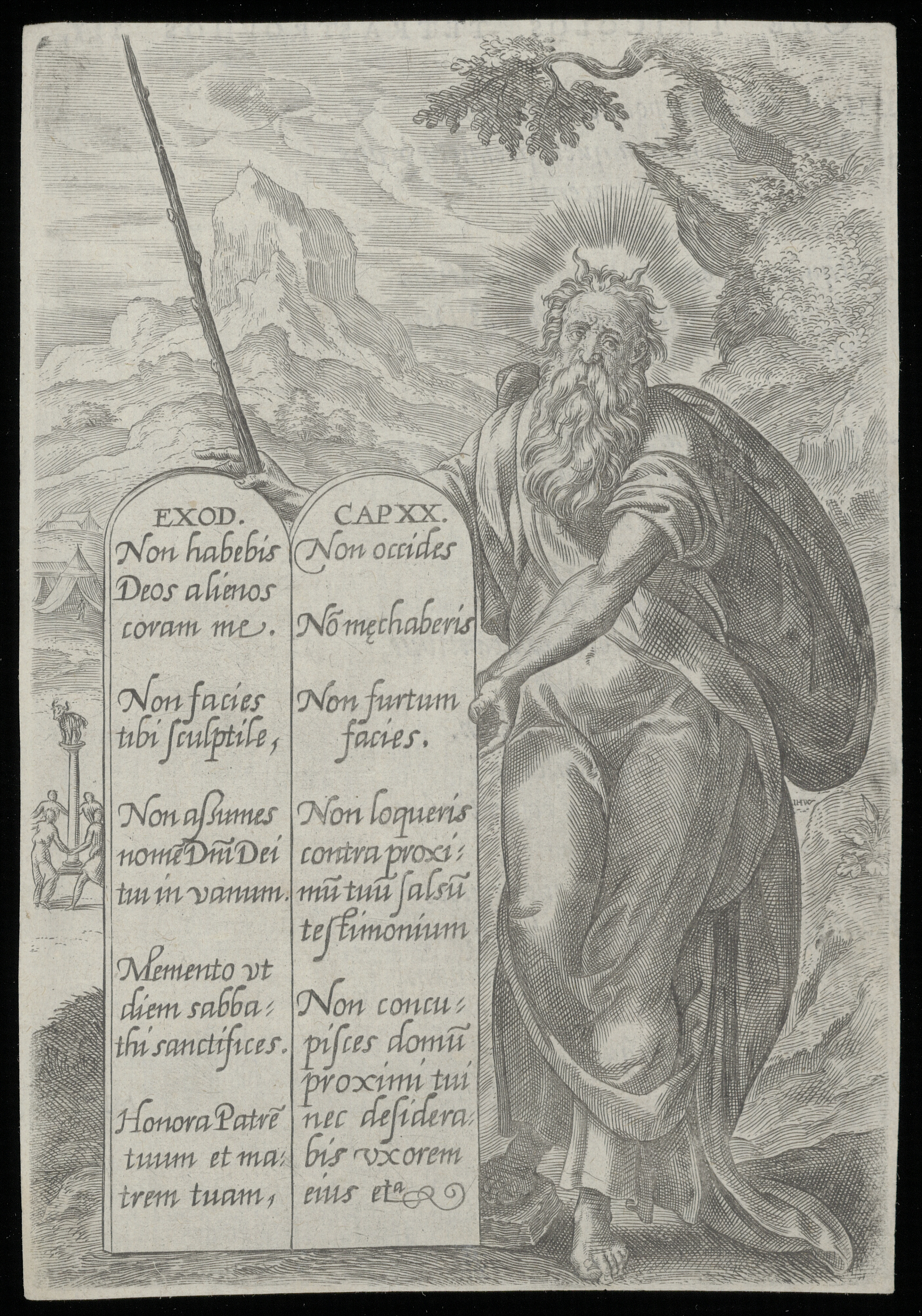
Print of Moses showing the Ten Commandments. Made at the end of the sixteenth century.

Exodus 34:28 identifies a different list, that of Exodus 34:11–27, as the Ten Commandments. Since this passage does not prohibit murder, adultery, theft, etc., but instead deals with the proper worship of Yahweh, some scholars call it the "Ritual Decalogue", and disambiguate the Ten Commandments of traditional understanding as the "Ethical Decalogue".

Richard Elliott Friedman argues that the Ten Commandments at Exodus 20:1–17 "does not appear to belong to any of the major sources. It is likely to be an independent document, which was inserted here by the Redactor." In his view, the Covenant Code follows that version of the Ten Commandments in the northern Israel E narrative. In the J narrative in Exodus 34 the editor of the combined story known as the Redactor (or RJE), adds in an explanation that these are a replacement for the earlier tablets which were shattered. "In the combined JE text, it would be awkward to picture God just commanding Moses to make some tablets, as if there were no history to this matter, so RJE adds the explanation that these are a replacement for the earlier tablets that were shattered." He suggests that differences in the J and E versions of the Ten Commandments story are a result of power struggles in the priesthood. The writer has Moses smash the tablets "because this raised doubts about the Judah's central religious shrine".

== Political importance ==
Christopher Hitchens criticised the Ten Commandments for failing to prohibit either rape, child abuse, slavery or genocide, while elsewhere, he said, the Bible even appears to endorse slavery and genocide. He explained these failings by concluding that the commandments were man-made, reflecting "a nomadic tribe whose main economy is primitive agriculture and whose wealth is sometimes counted in people as well as animals"; furthermore, a tribe which believes it has been "promised the land and flocks of other people: the Amalekites and Midianites and others whom God orders them to kill, rape, enslave, or exterminate". Hitchens described the God of the Bible as "a Bronze Age demagogue", whose omission of these offences was "negligent ... even by the lax standards of the time". He criticised as immoral the collective punishment of future children for the failings of their ancestors, where it states in the third commandment: "I the lord thy God am a jealous God, visiting the iniquity of the fathers upon the children unto the third and fourth generation." Regarding the tenth commandment, he questioned why, given that human beings seem so susceptible to the temptations of lust and envy that their creator prohibits, a god would have in fact created them that way. He wrote: "This leaves us with the insoluble mystery ... Create them sick, and then command them to be well?" Hitchens argued that the Ten Commandments are not a sound foundation for law or morality, as they reflect authoritarianism, insecurity, and outdated tribal values, and that the real issue is not their public display but the incompatibility of religion with true ethical reasoning.

According to Richard J. Clifford, Jesuit priest and professor emeritus of Old Testament at Weston Jesuit School of Theology, the tenth commandment accepts slavery as normal, as it states: "You shall not covet your neighbor's wife, his male or female slave, his ox or donkey, or anything that belongs to your neighbor."

According to some scholars, certain interpretations of the Commandments have been problematic for people, like capital punishment for blasphemy, idolatry, apostasy, adultery, cursing one own parents, and Sabbath-breaking.

During an 1846 uprising, now known as the Galician slaughter, by impoverished and famished Galician Eastern European peasants (serfs) directed against szlachta (Polish nobles) because of their oppression (for example, manorial prisons), a popular rumor had it that the Austrian Emperor had abolished the Ten Commandments, which the peasants took as permission and religious justification to massacre the szlachta – the prime representatives and beneficiaries of the crown in Austrian Galicia. This uprising is credited with helping to bring on the demise, in 1848, of serfdom with corvée labor in Galicia.

== United States debate over display on public property ==
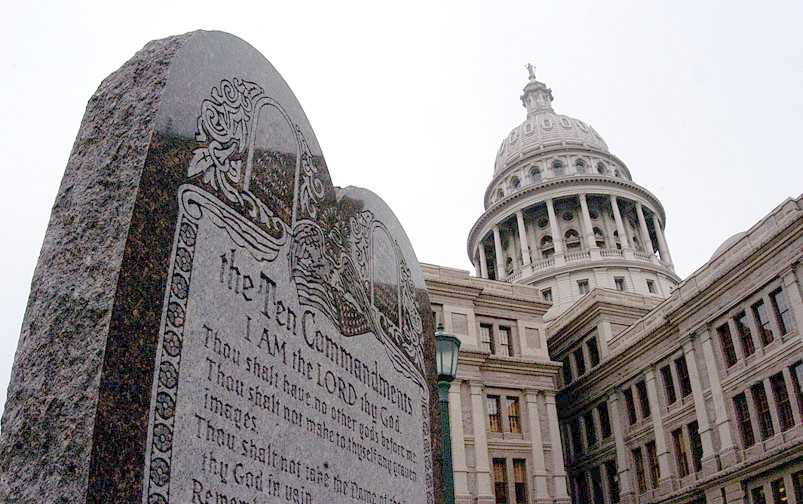
Ten Commandments display at the Texas State Capitol in Austin

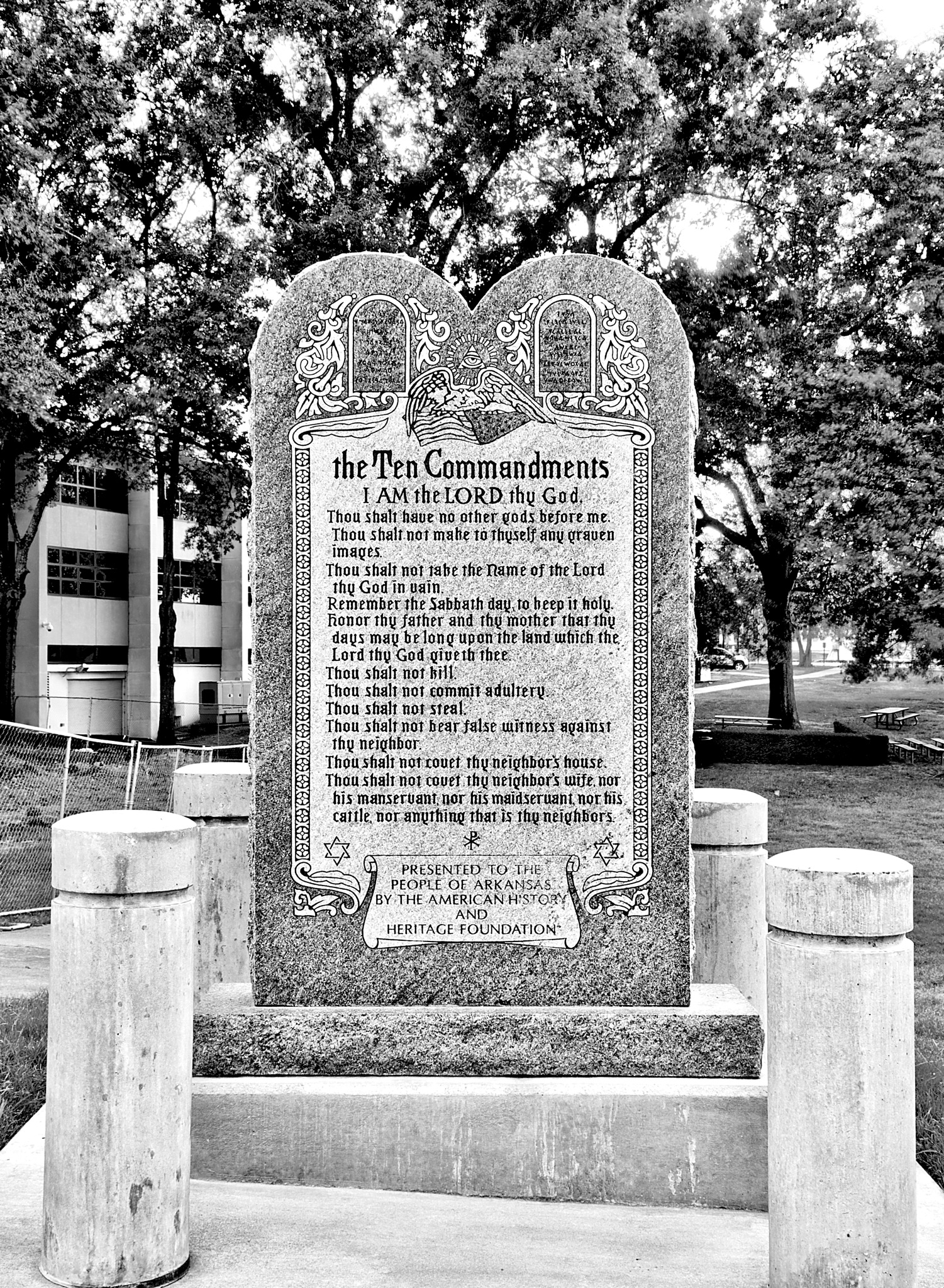
Ten Commandments Monument at the Arkansas State Capitol

European Protestants replaced some visual art in their churches with plaques of the Ten Commandments after the Reformation. In England, such "Decalogue boards" also represented the English monarch's emphasis on rule of royal law within the churches. The United States Constitution forbids establishment of religion by law; however images of Moses holding the tablets of the Decalogue, along other religious figures including Solomon, Confucius, and Muhammad holding the Quran, are sculpted on the north and south friezes of the pediment of the Supreme Court building in Washington. Images of the Ten Commandments have long been contested symbols for the relationship of religion to national law.

In the 1950s and 1960s the Fraternal Order of Eagles placed possibly thousands of Ten Commandments displays in courthouses and school rooms, including many stone monuments on courthouse property. Because displaying the commandments can reflect a sectarian position if they are numbered, the Eagles developed an ecumenical version that omitted the numbers, as on the monument at the Texas capitol. Hundreds of monuments were also placed by director Cecil B. DeMille as a publicity stunt to promote his 1956 film The Ten Commandments. Placing the plaques and monuments to the Ten Commandments in and around government buildings was another expression of mid-twentieth-century U.S. civil religion, along with adding the phrase "under God" to the Pledge of Allegiance.

By the beginning of the twenty-first century in the U.S., however, Decalogue monuments and plaques in government spaces had become a legal battleground between religious as well as political liberals and conservatives. Organizations such as the American Civil Liberties Union (ACLU) and Americans United for Separation of Church and State launched lawsuits challenging the posting of the ten commandments in public buildings. The ACLU has been supported by a number of religious groups such as the Presbyterian Church (U.S.A.) and the American Jewish Congress.

=== In public schools ===
US map of states with Ten Commandments laws as of 2026: Louisiana, Arkansas, Texas, and Alabama (red) require schools to have it; Tennessee (orange) allows schools to have it

In 1980, the U.S. Supreme Court in Stone v. Graham ruled unconstitutional a Kentucky statute that required the posting of a copy of the Ten Commandments on the wall of each public classroom in the state, because the statute lacked a nonreligious, legislative purpose.

In 2023, Texas Republican politician Phil King introduced SB 1515 of the 88th Session of the Texas Senate, which would require that the Ten Commandments be displayed in every classroom of every public school in Texas. The bill eventually lapsed in the State House when the session closed without voting it. It was later passed in 2025 as Texas Senate Bill 10. The law faces multiple legal challenges under the Establishment Clause and Free Exercise Clause of the First Amendment. In November 2025, a federal judge issued a preliminary injunction blocking the state law. On April 21, 2026, the U.S. Court of Appeals for the Fifth Circuit ruled that the state law does not violate the U.S. Constitution or establish a state religion and reversed the lower court's injunction. On August 17, 2026, a writ of certiorari was filed with the U.S. Supreme Court for the Fifth Circuit's ruling.

On June 19, 2024, Louisiana Governor Jeff Landry signed House Bill 71 mandating display of the Ten Commandments in every public school classroom. The bill also permits the additional display of the Mayflower Compact, the United States Declaration of Independence or the Northwest Ordinance. Governor Landry stated that the Ten Commandments are "not solely religious, but that it has historical significance." The bill mandates a text that includes the phrase "Thou shalt not make to thyself any graven images" indicating that it comes not from a traditional Bible but instead from the Eagles-DeMille promotion campaign. A group of parents challenged the law in court, and on November 12, 2024, United States District Judge John W. deGravelles granted a temporary injunction in Roake v. Brumley, stating that the law is "unconstitutional on its face." On November 15, the United States Court of Appeals for the Fifth Circuit granted an emergency stay motion from the state of Louisiana, limiting the ruling to the five parishes whose school boards were named as defendants in the case. In June 2025, a three-member panel of the Fifth Circuit ruled that Louisiana's law requiring the Ten Commandments be displayed in all public school classrooms in the state is unconstitutional and affirmed the lower court's November 2024 decision. On February 20, 2026, the en banc Fifth Circuit voted 12–6 to lift the injunction, on the grounds that it was premature to decide the law's constitutionality before it had been enacted. Writing in concurrence, Judge James Ho, stated that the statute "is not just constitutional – it affirms our nation's highest and most noble traditions." The six dissenting judges argued that the law subjects students to government-endorsed religion in public school classrooms in violation of the Establishment Clause. Judge James L. Dennis wrote in dissent that such state action "is precisely the kind of establishment the Framers anticipated and sought to prevent."

In Arkansas, a Ten Commandments law was signed into law by Governor Sarah Huckabee Sanders on April 14, 2025. In August 2025, the U.S. District Court for the Western District of Arkansas ruled that the law was unconstitutional under Stone v. Graham and granted the plaintiff-parents' request for a preliminary injunction.

== See also ==
- Alternatives to the Ten Commandments – Secular and humanist alternatives to the biblical lists
- Code of Hammurabi (1772 BC)
- Code of Ur-Nammu (2050 BC)
- Divine command theory
- Five Pillars of Islam
- Five Precepts (Taoism)
- Five Precepts (Buddhism)
- Eight precepts (Buddhism)
- Maat, 42 confessions, 'The negative confession' (1500 BC) of the Papyrus of Ani, which is also known as The declaration of innocence before the Gods of the tribunal from The book of going forth by day, also Book of the Dead
- Nine Noble Virtues
- Seven deadly sins
- Seven Laws of Noah
- The Ten Commandments (2007 film)
- Ten Commandments of Computer Ethics
- Ten Conditions of Bai'at
- Three Fundamental Bonds and Five Constant Virtues (Confucianism)
- Yamas (Hinduism)
