= Oklahoma Statewide Charter School Board v. Drummond =

Oklahoma Statewide Charter School Board v. Drummond St. Isidore of Seville Catholic Virtual School v. Drummond
- Supreme Court of the United States

Argued April 30, 2025 Decided May 22, 2025
- Full case name: Oklahoma Statewide Charter School Board, et al., v. Gentner Drummond, Attorney General of Oklahoma, ex rel. Oklahoma; St. Isidore of Seville Catholic Virtual School, v. Gentner Drummond, Attorney General of Oklahoma, ex rel. Oklahoma
- Docket nos.: 24-394; 24-396

Questions presented
- (1) Whether the academic and pedagogical choices of a privately owned and run school constitute state action simply because it contracts with the state to offer a free educational option for interested students; and (2) Whether a state violates the Free Exercise Clause by excluding privately run religious schools from the state's charter-school program solely because the schools are religious, or whether a state can justify such an exclusion by invoking antiestablishment interests that go further than the Establishment Clause requires.

Holding
- The judgment was affirmed by an equally-divided court.

Court membership
- Chief Justice John Roberts Associate Justices Clarence Thomas · Samuel Alito; Sonia Sotomayor · Elena Kagan; Neil Gorsuch · Brett Kavanaugh; Amy Coney Barrett · Ketanji Brown Jackson

Case opinion
- Per curiam
- Barrett took no part in the consideration or decision of the case.

Laws applied
- U.S. Const. amend. I

Oklahoma Statewide Charter School Board v. Drummond, 605 U.S. 165 (2025), consolidated with St. Isidore of Seville Catholic Virtual School, v. Drummond, is a case in which the United States Supreme Court was tasked with deciding whether state governments can prohibit religious charter schools from using public funds under the Establishment Clause of the First Amendment. With Associate Justice Amy Coney Barrett recused, the Supreme Court was split 4–4, upholding the Oklahoma Supreme Court ruling that prohibited public funds from going to religious schools without establishing a nationwide precedent.

== Background ==
Recent Supreme Court cases have been said to have weakened the Establishment Clause, which has generally defined that public funds should not be used for a nonsecular purpose. In June 2022, the Court ruled in Carson v. Makin that Maine's school voucher program, which as written excluded religious schools, was unconstitutional with Chief Justice John Roberts writing for the majority that "Maine's decision to continue excluding religious schools from its tuition assistance program promotes stricter separation of church and state than the Federal Constitution requires."

Oklahoma's then-current attorney general John M. O'Connor and solicitor general Zach West wrote a memo in December 2022, citing Carson v. Makin, as well as Espinoza v. Montana Department of Revenue and Trinity Lutheran Church of Columbia, Inc. v. Comer, in claiming that an Oklahoma law barring nonsecular schools from being part of the state's charter school program was unconstitutional, and should such a challenge reach the U.S. Supreme Court, they would likely agree with this position. This memo was supported by Governor Kevin Stitt.

Spurred by the memo, the Roman Catholic Archdiocese of Oklahoma City and Roman Catholic Diocese of Tulsa applied to the state's virtual charter school board by April 2023, requesting to operate the St. Isidore of Seville Catholic Virtual School within the state's public charter program. If granted, St. Isidore would be the first nonsecular school to be part of a public school system in the United States. The St. Isidore petition had Stitt's support as well as that of state superintendent Ryan Walters, while the Catholic Conference of Oklahoma said the goal was to create a case that would reach the courts to resolve the question whether the Establishment Clause blocked such schools. The board initially denied the bid in April 2023 on a 5–0 vote, based on the state's constitution and other statues that disallows the use of public money for religious schools, though allowed for a revised petition.

By the time of the June 2023 vote, one of the board members had been replaced by the speaker of the Oklahoma house of representatives, Charles McCall, which helped to swing the new vote to pass 3–2. The decision was praised by Stitt and Walters, but other religious groups as well as the state's current attorney general, Gentner Drummond, who took office in January 2023, objected that the decision set a dangerous precedence in regard to the separation of church and state.

== Lower court ==
In October 2023, Drummond sued the Oklahoma Statewide Charter School Board to challenge their vote with the Oklahoma Supreme Court on statutory and constitutional grounds, arguing that nonsecular schools threatened the state's ability to access federal funding. Oral arguments were held in April 2024, and in June 2024, the Court ruled in a 6–2 decision that establishing St. Isidore with public funds violated the Establishment Clause, Oklahoma state constitution, and other state laws that blocked public funds for religious schools.

== Supreme Court ==
The Supreme Court granted certiorari in January 2025. Justice Amy Coney Barrett took no part in the case; while she did not give a reason, NBC News noted that she formerly taught at Notre Dame Law School, and its religious liberty legal clinic was representing St. Isidore in the case.

Based on oral arguments held on April 30, 2025, journalists opined that Thomas, Alito, Kavanaugh and Gorsuch appeared to favor the charter school's arguments, while Sotomayor, Kagan and Jackson appeared to favor Drummond's arguments. Chief Justice John Roberts was widely viewed as a potential swing vote in the case. On May 22, 2025, the Supreme Court issued a per curiam opinion announcing that it was split 4–4, affirming the Oklahoma Supreme Court ruling that prohibited public funds from going to religious schools. Because the Court was evenly divided, the case did not set a binding nationwide precedent. Since 1826, it has been the high court's policy that an equally divided court will affirm the lower court's decision without comment, but the affirmance is res judicata only as to the parties to the case.

== See also ==
- Separation of church and state in the United States
- United States religion landmark court decisions
- Trinity Lutheran Church of Columbia, Inc. v. Comer, 582 U.S. 449 (2017)
- Espinoza v. Montana Department of Revenue, 591 U.S. 464 (2020)
- Carson v. Makin, 596 U.S. 767 (2022)
