= School choice in the United States =

Term for pre-college public education options

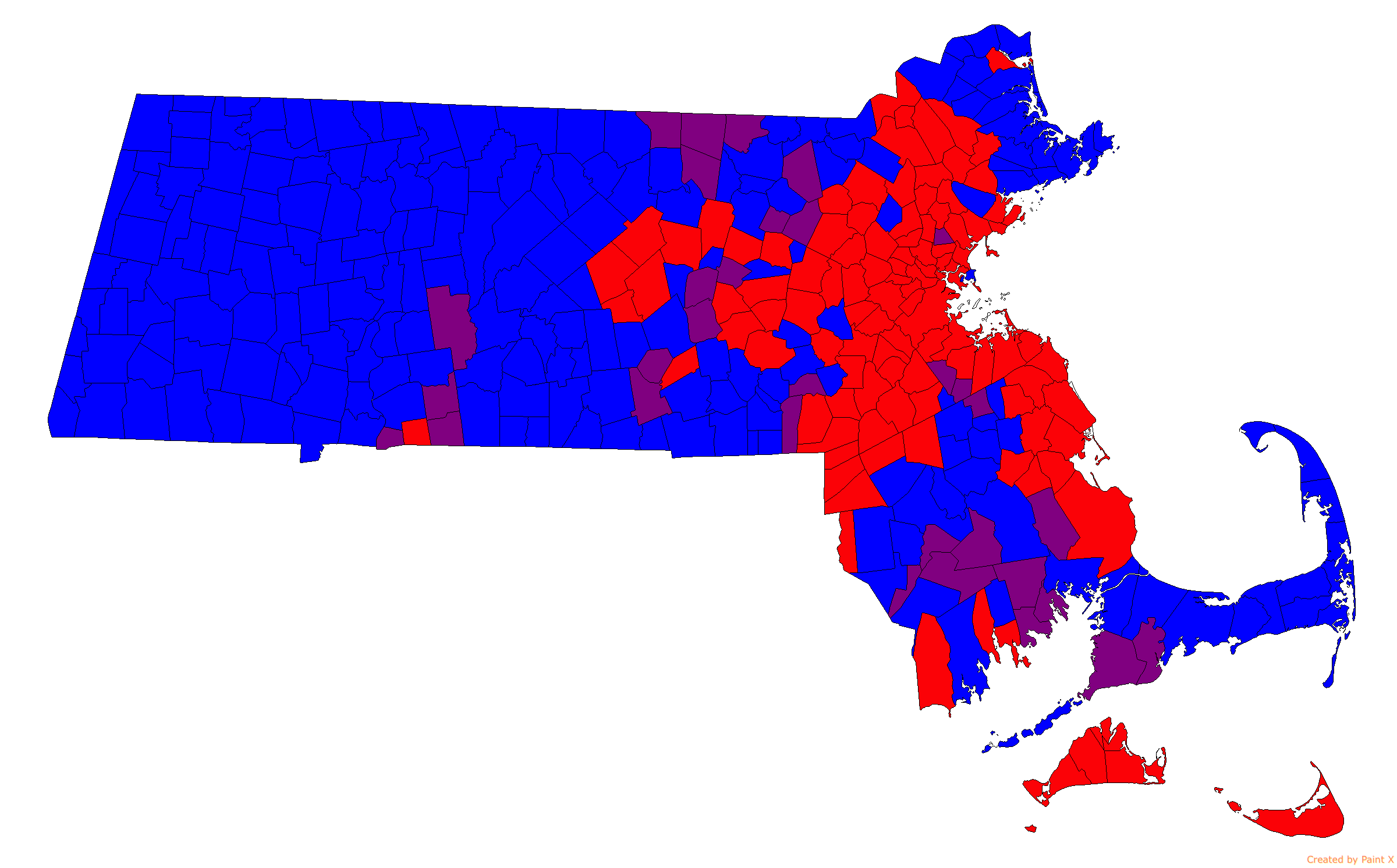
The Commonwealth of Massachusetts allows the school committees of public school districts to have open enrollment policies. Towns in Massachusetts represented by the "School Choice Receiving District Status" (open enrollment status) of their public high school district for the 2016–2017 academic year. Towns represented in blue have school districts with an open enrollment policy for kindergarten through high school. Towns represented in purple have school districts with open enrollment only for specific grades. Towns represented in red have school districts with a closed enrollment policy.

School choice in the United States allows students and families to select alternatives to public schools. It is the subject of fierce debate in various state legislatures across the United States.

The most common type of school choice in the United States, measured both by the number of programs and by the number of participating students, are scholarship tax credit programs. These allow individuals or corporations to receive tax credits toward their state taxes in exchange for donations made to non-profit organizations that grant private school scholarships. A similar subsidy may be provided by a state through a school voucher program.

Other school choice options include open enrollment laws (which allow students to attend public schools other than their neighborhood school), charter schools, magnet schools, virtual schools, homeschooling, education savings accounts (ESAs), and individual education tax credits or deductions.

== History ==
In a 1955 essay, "The Role of Government in Education", economist Milton Friedman proposed using free market principles in assigning students to schools, which he believed would improve the United States public school system. The typical practice at that time was to assign children to the public school nearest their home. Friedman proposed that parents should be able to receive education funds in the form of school vouchers, which would allow them to choose their children's schools from among public, private, and religious and non-religious options.

Following the landmark 1954 Brown v. Board of Education case, school voucher programs grew in popularity in the American south, acting as a form of resistance to desegregation. For example, Virginia's 1956 Stanley Plan used vouchers to finance white-only private schools known as segregation academies. Other states followed until the practice was disallowed by Griffin v. County School Board of Prince Edward County (1964). Still, many private schools discriminated against Black Americans and minorities. However, In 1976, the Runyon v. McCrary ruling determined that this practice violated federal law.

In 1995, Friedman slammed the public school system for its “dismal results: some relatively good government schools in high-income suburbs and communities; very poor government schools in our inner cities.” In 1996, Friedman and his wife, Rose Friedman, founded the Friedman Foundation for Educational Choice (later EdChoice).

In Zelman v. Simmons-Harris in 2002, the Supreme Court of the United States declared that school vouchers could be used to pay for education in sectarian schools without violating the Establishment Clause of the First Amendment. As a result, states are free to enact voucher programs that provide funding for any school of the parent's choosing so long as the programs are religiously neutral—neither favoring nor disfavoring religious schools.

In 2004, Congress enacted the D.C. Opportunity Scholarship Program, which provided scholarships to 2000 low-income students. In 2008, students came from families with an average income of $22,736, approximately 107 percent of the federal poverty level for a family of four.

School choice had become a partisan issue by 2009. Democratic support waned, while Republican support continued to broaden. The Democratic-led Congress attempted to phase out the DC program, despite a waiting list of 9,000 low income children. The Obama administration provided funding incentives to states and school districts to increase the number of charter schools. In 2011 Republicans became the majority and renewed the program. In the 2009 and 2010 elections, school-choice-supporting Republicans gained seven governors’ seats. 12 states expanded school choice in 2011. Newly Republican states enacted half of that year's school-choice legislation.

A poll found that 60 percent of American voters felt that tax credits support parents whereas 26 percent felt that tax credits support religion.

About 1.8 million children were homeschooled in 2012.

In 2015, 14 cities had 30% or more of their students in charter schools, led by New Orleans, with 93%.

Republicans won a state legislative supermajority in 2020 and offered education savings accounts to students of all incomes.

In the 2020 Espinoza v. Montana Department of Revenue case, the Supreme Court ruled that states could not restrict religious schools from participating in voucher programs simply because the school was run by a religious organization. The Court further ruled in Carson v. Makin that states could not bar parents from participating in a school choice program because they sent their children to a school that provides religious instruction. To do so would violate the Free Exercise Clause.

By 2021, school choice students numbered 621,000, up from 200,000 in 2011. The next expansion was driven by pandemic-related dissatisfaction with public school policies and curricula. While many European school systems reopened in spring 2020, American public schools generally remained closed until the fall of 2021. For the 2020–2021 school year, public school enrollment fell by 3 percent. Private and charter schools grew an estimated 7 percent. 18 states either initiated school-choice programs or expanded offerings, making 3.6 million American students eligible for school choice and/or homeschool support programs. Several states expanded eligibility to include middle-class children.

As of May 2022, 72% of U.S. parents favored vouchers, 76% supported education savings accounts, and 71% favored charter schools in the United States.

Georgia, Alabama, Arkansas, Louisiana, Florida and South Carolina all have passed new or expanded voucher-style programs since 2023.

Recently, ESAs programs have grown the most between these programs and they have been emphasized in local political conversations.

In 2025, as a part of the One Big Beautiful Bill Act, a federal tax-credit was created for state private-school scholarships that will start in 2027. States would have to opt-in to this program in order to give donors tax credits for their contributions.

== Religiosity and school diversity ==
The efficacy of school choice programs is determined by intra-family dynamics. A 2007 study found that the outcomes of students in private school choice programs improved at religious schools only when the family was religious. Additionally, several factors play into whether families choose to take advantage of school choice programs, including the families' proximity to nearby private schools, access to information about programs, and the education of the parents in the family.

Studies have also found that school choice programs have an impact on school diversity. A study in D.C. found that voucher-accepting schools were more integrated than those who did not accept vouchers. 85.4% of D.C.'s public schools have at least 90% of students with the same race; only 47.3% of voucher-accepting schools have the same demographics.

== By state ==
=== Active programs ===
==== Alabama ====
The Creating Hope and Opportunity for Our Students' Education Act of 2024 (CHOOSE Act) created a tax-credit scholarships that offer up to $7,000 to students in an Education Savings Accounting.

==== Arizona ====
The Empowerment Scholarship Account set up in Arizona provided ESAs to 102,359 student this past year and that number is expected to rise in the future.

==== Arkansas ====
The Arkansas Education Freedom Account (EFA) Program provides families with funding for approved educational expenses.

==== Florida ====
The Family Empowerment Scholarship Program provides private school tuition for qualifying students and transportation stipends for those in need.

==== Georgia ====
The Georgia Promise Scholarships can give students in bad public schools up to $6,500 for private school tuition or other resources.

==== Indiana ====
Indiana has an ESA programs that families that have children with disabilities with funds form the Indiana Department of Education.

==== Iowa ====
In Iowa, Students First Education Savings Accounts give money in the form of ESAs to students who chose to attend private schools. For the 2026-2027 school year, this amount will be $8,148.

==== Louisiana ====
The Louisiana Giving All True Opportunity to Rise (LA GATOR) Scholarship Program was created in 2024 and provides eligible families with ESAs.

==== Missouri ====
The Missouri Empowerment Scholarships Accounts Program, which was enacted in 2021, provides an average of $6,375 to approximately 2,700 students in the state.

==== New Hampshire ====
New Hampshire's Education Freedom Accounts is eligible to all families whose income is at or below 350% of the federal poverty line.

==== North Carolina ====
The ESA+ Scholarship in North Carolina goes towards families that have children with disabilities, offering to pay for services like speech therapy, tutoring, and educational technology.

==== Oklahoma ====
The Parental Choice Tax Credit in Oklahoma provides families with income tax credits that cover the cost of tuition and educational expenses.

==== Tennessee ====
Tennessee has ESA programs that provide funds to students in the Memphis, Nashville, and Hamilton County school areas.

==== Texas ====
In 2025, Texas legislature passed a bill that provided $1 billion in funding to create the Texas Education Freedom Accounts Program.

==== Utah ====
Starting in the 2024-2025 school year, Utah's Fits All Scholarship Program provides various funds to students through the form of ESAs as needed.

==== West Virginia ====
West Virginia offers a flexible ESA program called the Hope Scholarship.

==== Wyoming ====
Wyoming's Steamboat Legacy Scholarship Act, which was signed in 2024, provides eligible students with an ESA.

=== Historical policies ===
==== Alabama ====
In 2022, Alabama increased scholarship funding by 50%, to $30B.

==== Arizona ====
The Arizona Individual Private School Tuition Tax Credit Program in 2014 offered $1,053 (individuals), and couples ($2,106). Nearly 24,000 children received scholarships in the 2011–2012 school year. The program started in 1998, reaching over 77,500 taxpayers, providing over $500 million in scholarship money for children at private schools across the state. The Arizona program survived a court challenge, in part, because the program permitted students to use the scholarship money on a range of educational expenses, not just private schools. This distinguished the program from an earlier voucher program that the Arizona Supreme Court had held was unconstitutional because students could only use the voucher at private schools.

Arizona created education savings accounts for special needs students.

==== California ====
California created its District of Choice program in 1993. It allows California public school district to enroll students residing outside district lines. As of 2016, 47 California school districts and 10,000 students participated in District of Choice, serving five percent of school districts and 0.2 percent of students.

==== Florida ====
In 2011, Florida grew special-ed vouchers, simplified the rules that allowed students to transfer out of failing schools, and increased the cap on charter schools. In the 2020s, Florida directed ~$200 million to increased low-income scholarships, while raising the income cap to $100,000, to reach an estimated 60,000 more students.

In 2014, a lawsuit sought to challenge the legality of the Florida voucher program, but was dismissed.

==== Georgia ====
Greater Opportunities for Access to Learning (GOAL) is the Georgia program that offers a state income tax credit to donors of scholarships to private schools. Representative David Casas passed school choice legislation in Georgia.

==== Indiana ====
Indiana removed the limit on charter schools, allowed universities to authorize charters, and established vouchers for low- and middle-income students.

==== Iowa ====
In Iowa, the Educational Opportunities Act was enacted in 2006, creating tax credits for eligible donors to scholarship-granting organizations (SGO)s. These tax caps were $5 million originally, but in 2007 increased to $7.5 million.

==== Massachusetts ====
The Commonwealth of Massachusetts permits families to "enroll [students] in schools [within] communities other than the city or town in which they reside." Officially known as the "Inter-District School Choice Program", the program is authorized by MGL, Part I, Title XII, Chapter 76, Section 12B.

==== Louisiana ====
Louisiana added scholarships for special-needs students. In the aftermath of Hurricane Katrina, the Louisiana state government fully privatized the education system of New Orleans, replacing all local school boards with charter schools that operated independently of the state and local government.

==== New Hampshire ====
New Hampshire established a universal school choice program in 2025.

==== New Jersey ====
In 2007, Newark launched alternatives to poorly performing local schools. Governor Chris Christie worked with mayor Cory Booker to expand charter schools there.

==== Ohio ====
Ohio doubled the state’s scholarship program and increased scholarship/tutoring funding for low-income students in Cleveland.

==== Oklahoma ====
Oklahoma created a tax-credit scholarship program for low-income students.

==== South Dakota ====
South Dakota expanded tax-credit scholarships.

==== West Virginia ====
In 2018–19 in West Virginia, teachers fought a charter expansion, twice launching strikes.

==== Wisconsin ====
Milwaukee mayor John Norquist (D) and Wisconsin governor Tommy Thompson (R) initiated school vouchers in Milwaukee in 1990. Minnesota was the first state to have a charter school law and the nation's first charter school was City Academy High School, which opened in St. Paul, Minnesota, in 1992.

In 2011, Wisconsin opened the Milwaukee program to all city students and introduced a similar plan in Racine. In 2013, vouchers were made available to qualifying families across Wisconsin, reaching more than 14,500 students in 2022.

== Public opinion ==
As of 2024, voters have never voted to expand school vouchers.

== See also ==
- School-choice mechanism: an algorithm for matching pupils to schools in a way that respects the pupils' preferences and the schools' priorities.
- School voucher
- Tax choice
