= Separation of church and state in the United States =

Political principle in the United States

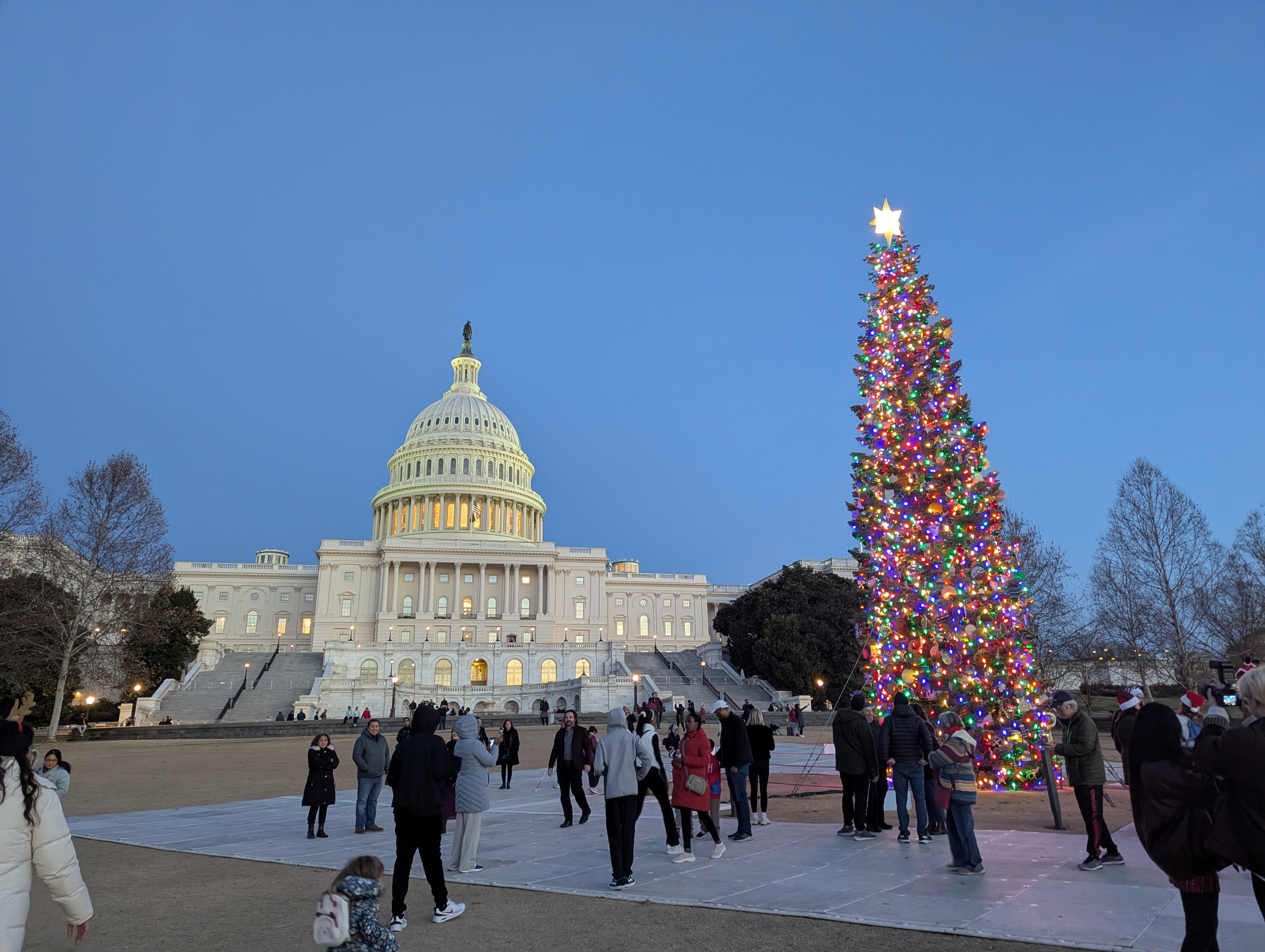
The Capitol Christmas Tree

"Separation of church and state" is a metaphor paraphrased from Thomas Jefferson and used by others in discussions of the Establishment Clause and Free Exercise Clause of the First Amendment to the United States Constitution, which reads: "Congress shall make no law respecting an establishment of religion, or prohibiting the free exercise thereof".

The principle is paraphrased from Jefferson's "separation between Church & State". It has been used to express the understanding of the intent and function of this amendment, which allows freedom of religion. It is generally traced to a January 1, 1802, letter by Jefferson, addressed to the Danbury Baptist Association in Connecticut, and published in a Massachusetts newspaper.

Jefferson wrote:

Believing with you that religion is a matter which lies solely between Man & his God, that he owes account to none other for his faith or his worship, that the legitimate powers of government reach actions only, & not opinions, I contemplate with sovereign reverence that act of the whole American people which declared that their legislature should "make no law respecting an establishment of religion, or prohibiting the free exercise thereof," thus building a wall of separation between Church & State. Adhering to this expression of the supreme will of the nation in behalf of the rights of conscience, I shall see with sincere satisfaction the progress of those sentiments which tend to restore to man all his natural rights, convinced he has no natural right in opposition to his social duties.

Jefferson reflects other thinkers, including Roger Williams, a Baptist Dissenter and founder of Providence, Rhode Island. He wrote:

When they [the Church] have opened a gap in the hedge or wall of separation between the garden of the church and the wilderness of the world, God hath ever broke down the wall itself, removed the Candlestick, etc., and made His Garden a wilderness as it is this day. And that therefore if He will ever please to restore His garden and paradise again, it must of necessity be walled in peculiarly unto Himself from the world, and all that be saved out of the world are to be transplanted out of the wilderness of the World.

In keeping with the lack of an established state religion in the United States, unlike in many European nations at the time, Article Six of the United States Constitution specifies that "no religious Test shall ever be required as a Qualification to any Office or public Trust under the United States", meaning that no official state religion will be established.

The U.S. Supreme Court has repeatedly cited Jefferson's metaphor of a wall of separation. In Reynolds v. United States (1879), the Court wrote that Jefferson's comments "may be accepted almost as an authoritative declaration of the scope and effect of the [First] Amendment." In Everson v. Board of Education (1947), Justice Hugo Black wrote: "In the words of Thomas Jefferson, the clause against establishment of religion by law was intended to erect a wall of separation between church and state."

In contrast to this emphasis on separation, the Supreme Court in Zorach v. Clauson (1952) upheld accommodationism, holding that the nation's "institutions presuppose a Supreme Being" and governmental recognition of God does not constitute the establishment of a state church the Constitution's authors intended to prohibit.

The extent of separation between government and religion in the U.S. continues to be debated.

== Early history ==
Many early immigrants traveled to North America to avoid religious persecution in their homelands, whether based on a different denomination, religion or sect. Some immigrants came from England after the English Civil War and the rise of Protestant dissenting sects in England. Others fled Protestant-Catholic religious conflicts in France and Germany. Immigrants included nonconformists such as the Puritans, who were Protestant Christians fleeing religious persecution from the Anglican King of England, and later Dissenters, such as Baptists. In addition, because of the rebellion from nonconformists, other nonconformists made a deal with the King for freedom in North America.

The groups had a variety of attitudes on religious toleration; the Puritans, for instance, initially wanted a totally Puritan society. Some leaders, such as Roger Williams of Rhode Island and Quaker William Penn of Pennsylvania, ensured the protection of religious minorities within their colonies, but the Plymouth Colony and Massachusetts Bay Colony in New England established Congregational churches, initially Puritan. The Dutch colony of New Netherland established its state Dutch Reformed Church and outlawed all other worship, though enforcement was sparse in what was essentially a trading, mercantile colony. In some cases, jurisdictions wanted religious conformity for financial reasons: the established Church was responsible for poor relief, putting dissenting churches at a significant disadvantage.

=== State churches in British North America prior to the Revolution ===
==== Catholic colonies ====
- The Colony of Maryland was founded by a charter granted in 1632 to George Calvert, secretary of state to Charles I, and his son Cecil, both recent converts to Catholicism. Under their leadership allowing the practice of this denomination, many English Catholic gentry families settled in Maryland. The colonial government was officially neutral in religious affairs, granting toleration to all Christian groups and enjoining them to avoid actions that antagonized the others. On several occasions, "low-church" dissenters among Protestants led insurrections that temporarily overthrew the Calvert rule. In 1689, when William and Mary came to the English throne, they acceded to Protestant demands to revoke the original royal charter. In 1701 the Church of England was "established" as the state church in Maryland. Through the course of the eighteenth century, Protestants barred Catholics from public office in the colony, and then prohibited them from voting, disenfranchising them. Not all of the laws passed against Catholic (notably laws restricting property rights and imposing penalties for sending children to be educated in foreign Catholic institutions) were enforced, and some Catholics continued to hold public office.
- When New France was transferred to Great Britain in 1763 after it defeated France in the Seven Years' War, it practiced a policy of tolerating the Catholic Church in the colony. No Catholic people in Quebec or other parts of New France were forced to convert to the Anglican Church. The British did open the colony to Protestant Huguenots, who had been banned from settlement by previous French colonial authorities - a continuation of discrimination that existed in France.
- Spanish Florida was ceded to Great Britain in 1763, in exchange for it giving up other claims. The British divided Florida into two colonies, East and West Florida. Both colonies had a policy of toleration for Catholic residents, as Catholicism had been the established religion of the Spanish colonies, but established the Church of England as the state church.

==== Protestant colonies ====
The colonies of Plymouth, Massachusetts Bay, Connecticut, New Haven, and New Hampshire were founded by Puritan Calvinist Protestants, and had Congregational established churches.

- Plymouth Colony was founded by Pilgrims, English Dissenters or Separatists, who were Calvinists.
- Massachusetts Bay Colony, New Haven Colony, and the New Hampshire were founded by Puritans, Anglican but Calvinist Protestants.
- The colonies of New York, Virginia, North Carolina, South Carolina, and Georgia officially maintained the Church of England as the established church, but the Anglican Church operated as an established church in the southern colonies. Absorbing the Dutch Calvinists and other Protestant immigrants, New York had a more diverse population.

There were also two non-British Protestant-dominated colonies that were later incorporated into British North America:

- New Netherland was founded by Dutch Reformed Calvinists.
- New Sweden was founded by Church of Sweden Lutherans.

==== Colonies without established churches ====
- The Colony of Rhode Island and Providence Plantations was founded by religious dissenters who were forced to flee the Massachusetts Bay colony. The Rhode Island Royal Charter of 1663 guaranteed "that all and every person and persons may, from time to time, and at all times hereafter, freely and fully have and enjoy his and their own judgments and consciences, in matters of religious concernments."
- The Province of Pennsylvania was founded by Quakers, but the colony never had an established church.
- The Province of New Jersey, without official religion, had a significant Quaker lobby, but Calvinists of all types also had a presence.
- West Jersey, also founded by Quakers, prohibited any establishment.
- Delaware Colony had no established church, but was contested between Catholics and Quakers.

==== Tabular summary ====
The following table lists all North American colonies administered by the United Kingdom at the commencement of the U.S. revolution, including states now incorporated in the U.S. and current provinces of Canada.

Colony	Denomination	Disestablished^{*}
Connecticut	Congregational	1818^{A}
Georgia	Church of England	1789^{B}
Maryland	Catholic	1701 (replaced by Church of England)
Maryland	Church of England	1776^{*}
Massachusetts	Congregational	1780 (state funding suspended in 1833)^{C}
New Brunswick	Church of England	N/A^{*}
New Hampshire	Congregational	1790^{D}
Newfoundland	Church of England	N/A^{*}
North Carolina	Church of England	1776^{E}
Nova Scotia	Church of England	1850
Prince Edward Island	Church of England	N/A^{*}
South Carolina	Church of England	1790
Canada West	Church of England	1854
West Florida	Church of England	N/A^{F}^{,}^{G}
East Florida	Church of England	N/A^{F}^{,}^{G}
Virginia	Church of England	1786^{H}
West Indies	Church of England	1868 (excl. Barbados)
Barbados	Church of England	1969

^Note *:In several colonies, the establishment ceased to exist in practice at the Revolution, about 1776. Some states' laws treat 1776 as the presumptive date of permanent legal abolition; other states' constitutions and/or laws either explicitly disestablished the state's established church (e.g. North Carolina^{E}) or forbade establishment of any religion. Some Canadian provinces (e.g. Nova Scotia) have disestablished the Church of England, but some of the pre-U.S.-revolutionary provinces retain it.

^Note A:See History of the Connecticut Constitution.

^Note B:In 1789, the Georgia Constitution was amended as follows: "Article IV. Section 10. No person within this state shall, upon any pretense, be deprived of the inestimable privilege of worshipping God in any manner agreeable to his own conscience, nor be compelled to attend any place of worship contrary to his own faith and judgment; nor shall he ever be obliged to pay tithes, taxes, or any other rate, for the building or repairing any place of worship, or for the maintenance of any minister or ministry, contrary to what he believes to be right, or hath voluntarily engaged to do. No one religious society shall ever be established in this state, in preference to another; nor shall any person be denied the enjoyment of any civil right merely on account of his religious principles."

^Note C:From 1780 to 1824, Massachusetts required every resident to belong to and attend a parish church, and permitted each church to tax its members, but forbade any law requiring that it be of any particular denomination. But in practice, the denomination of the local church was chosen by majority vote of town residents, which de facto established Congregationalism as the state religion. This was objected to, and was abolished in 1833. For details see Constitution of Massachusetts.

^Note D:Until 1877 the New Hampshire Constitution required members of the state legislature to be of the Protestant religion. Until 1968 the Constitution allowed for state funding of Protestant classrooms but not Catholic classrooms.

^Note E:The North Carolina Constitution of 1776 disestablished the Anglican church, but until 1835 it allowed only Protestants to hold public office. From 1835 to 1876 it allowed only Christians (including Catholics) to hold public office. Article VI, Section 8 of the current state constitution forbids only atheists ("any person who shall deny the being of Almighty God") from holding public office. The United States Supreme Court held such clauses to be unenforceable in the 1961 case Torcaso v. Watkins, when ruling unanimously that such clauses constitute a "religious test" forbidden by the First Amendment prohibiting federal religious tests and the protections in the Fourteenth Amendment, which apply to the states as well as the federal government under the doctrine of incorporation.

^Note F:Religious tolerance for Catholics with an established Church of England was the policy in the former Spanish Colonies of East and West Florida while under British rule.

^Note G:In the Treaty of Paris (1783), which ended the American Revolutionary War, the British ceded both East and West Florida back to Spain (see Spanish Florida).

^Note H:Tithes for the support of the Anglican Church in Virginia were suspended in 1776 and never restored. 1786 is the date of the Virginia Statute of Religious Freedom, which prohibited any coercion to support any religious body.

=== Colonial views on establishment, accommodationism, and separationism ===
The Library of Congress states that:

Many states were as explicit about the need for a thriving religion as Congress was in its thanksgiving and fast day proclamations. The Massachusetts Constitution of 1780 declared, for example, that "the happiness of a people, and the good order and preservation of civil government, essentially depend on piety, religion, and morality." The states were in a stronger position to act upon this conviction because they were considered to possess "general" powers as opposed to the limited, specifically enumerated powers of Congress. Congregationalists and Anglicans who, before 1776, had received public financial support, called their state benefactors "nursing fathers" (Isaiah 49:23).

The Rhode Island Royal Charter obtained in 1663 by Roger Williams and John Clarke contains unique provisions which make it significantly different from the charters granted to the other colonies. It gave the colonists freedom to elect their own governor and write their own laws, within very broad guidelines, and also stipulated that no person residing in Rhode Island could be "molested, punished, disquieted, or called in question for any differences in opinion in matters of religion".

The Flushing Remonstrance shows support for separation of church and state as early as the mid-17th century, stating their opposition to religious persecution of any sort: "The law of love, peace and liberty in the states extending to Jews, Turks and Egyptians, as they are considered sons of Adam, which is the glory of the outward state of Holland, so love, peace, and liberty, extending to all in Christ Jesus, condemns hatred, war, and bondage." The document was signed on December 27, 1657, by a group of English citizens in America who were affronted by persecution of Quakers and the religious policies of the Governor of New Netherland, Peter Stuyvesant. Stuyvesant had formally banned all religions other than the Dutch Reformed Church from being practiced in the colony, in accordance with the laws of the Dutch Republic. The signers indicated their "desire therefore in this case not to judge lest we are judged, neither to condemn least we are condemned, but rather let every man stand or fall to his own Master." Stuyvesant fined the petitioners and threw them in prison until they recanted, but John Bowne allowed the Quakers to meet in his home. Bowne was arrested, fined 150 guilders, and jailed for his refusal to pay. After three months, Stuyvesant sent him away to Amsterdam. Bowne appealed there to the Dutch West India Company, persuading its Directors to let him return to New Netherland. They also sent Stuyvesant a letter rebuking him for not tolerating religious dissent.

New York Historical Society President and Columbia University Professor of History Kenneth T. Jackson describes the Flushing Remonstrance as "the first thing that we have in writing in the United States where a group of citizens attests on paper and over their signature the right of the people to follow their own conscience with regard to God - and the inability of government, or the illegality of government, to interfere with that."

Given the wide diversity of opinion on Christian theological matters in the newly independent American States, the Constitutional Convention believed a government-sanctioned (established) religion would disrupt rather than bind the newly formed union together.

There were also opponents to the support of any established church even at the state level. In 1773, Isaac Backus, a prominent Baptist minister in New England, wrote against a state-sanctioned religion, saying: "Now who can hear Christ declare, that his kingdom is, not of this world, and yet believe that this blending of church and state together can be pleasing to him?" He also observed that when "church and state are separate, the effects are happy, and they do not at all interfere with each other: but where they have been confounded together, no tongue nor pen can fully describe the mischiefs that have ensued." Thomas Jefferson's influential Virginia Statute for Religious Freedom was enacted in 1786, five years before the Bill of Rights.

Most Anglican ministers and many Anglicans were Loyalists. The Anglican establishment, where it had existed, largely ceased to function during the American Revolution, though the new States did not formally abolish and replace it until some years after the Revolution.

=== Jefferson, Madison, and the "wall of separation" ===
The phrase "hedge or wall of separation between the garden of the church and the wilderness of the world" was first used by Baptist theologian Roger Williams, the founder of the colony of Rhode Island, in his 1644 book The Bloody Tenent of Persecution. The wall was established to protect freedom of religion from the government. In an 1802 letter to the Danbury Baptists (a religious minority concerned about the dominant position of the Congregational church in Connecticut), Thomas Jefferson used the phrase to describe the First Amendment and its restriction on the legislative branch of the federal government:

Believing with you that religion is a matter which lies solely between man and his god, that he owes account to none other for his faith or his worship, that the legitimate powers of government reach actions only, and not opinions, I contemplate with sovereign reverence that act of the whole American people which declared that their "legislature" should "make no law respecting an establishment of religion, or prohibiting the free exercise thereof," thus building a wall of separation between church and State. Adhering to this expression of the supreme will of the nation in behalf of the rights of conscience, I shall see with sincere satisfaction the progress of those sentiments which tend to restore to man all his natural rights, convinced he has no natural right in opposition to his social duties.

Jefferson's letter was in reply to a letter from the Danbury Baptist Association dated October 7, 1801. In an 1808 letter to Virginia Baptists, Jefferson used the same theme:

We have solved, by fair experiment, the great and interesting question whether freedom of religion is compatible with order in government and obedience to the laws. And we have experienced the quiet as well as the comfort which results from leaving every one to profess freely and openly those principles of religion which are the inductions of his own reason and the serious convictions of his own inquiries.

Jefferson and James Madison's conceptions of separation have long been debated. Jefferson refused to issue Proclamations of Thanksgiving sent to him by Congress during his presidency, though he did issue a Thanksgiving and Prayer proclamation as Governor of Virginia. Madison issued four religious proclamations while president, but vetoed two bills on the grounds they violated the first amendment. On the other hand, both Jefferson and Madison attended religious services at the Capitol. Years before the ratification of the Constitution, Madison contended, "Because if Religion be exempt from the authority of the Society at large, still less can it be subject to that of the Legislative Body." After retiring from the presidency, Madison wrote of "total separation of the church from the state."

Jefferson's opponents said his position was the destruction and the governmental rejection of Christianity, but this was a caricature. In setting up the University of Virginia, Jefferson encouraged each sect to have its own preacher, though there was a constitutional ban on the State supporting a Professorship of Divinity, arising from his own Virginia Statute for Religious Freedom. Some have argued that this arrangement was "fully compatible with Jefferson's views on the separation of church and state"; others point to Jefferson's support for a scheme in which students at the university would attend religious worship each morning as evidence that his views were not consistent with strict separation. Still other scholars, such as Mark David Hall, attempt to sidestep the issue by arguing that American jurisprudence focuses too narrowly on this one Jeffersonian letter while failing to account for other relevant history.

Jefferson's letter entered American jurisprudence in the 1878 Mormon polygamy case Reynolds v. U.S., in which Stephen Johnson Field cited Jefferson's "Letter to the Danbury Baptists" to state that "Congress was deprived of all legislative power over mere opinion, but was left free to reach actions which were in violation of social duties or subversive of good order."

Madison noted that Martin Luther's doctrine of the two kingdoms marked the beginning of the modern conception of separation of church and state.

=== Patrick Henry, Massachusetts, and Connecticut ===
Jefferson's and Madison's approach was not the only one taken in the 18th century. Jefferson's Virginia Statute for Religious Freedom was drafted in opposition to a bill, chiefly supported by Patrick Henry, that would permit any Virginian to belong to any denomination but require him to belong to some denomination and pay taxes to support it. Similarly, the Constitution of Massachusetts originally provided that "no subject shall be hurt, molested, or restrained, in his person, liberty, or estate, for worshipping God in the manner and season most agreeable to the dictates of his own conscience... provided he doth not disturb the public peace, or obstruct others in their religious worship" (Article II), but also that:

The people of this commonwealth have a right to invest their legislature with power to authorize and require, and the legislature shall, from time to time, authorize and require, the several towns, parishes, precincts, and other bodies politic, or religious societies, to make suitable provision, at their own expense, for the institution of the public worship of God, and for the support and maintenance of public Protestant teachers of piety, religion, and morality, in all cases where such provision shall not be made voluntarily. And the people of this commonwealth have also a right to, and do, invest their legislature with authority to enjoin upon all the subjects an attendance upon the instructions of the public teachers aforesaid, at stated times and seasons, if there be any on whose instructions they can conscientiously and conveniently attend. (Article III)

Since, in practice, this meant that the decision of who was taxable for a particular religion rested in the hands of the selectmen, usually Congregationalists, this system was open to abuse. It was abolished in 1833. The intervening period is sometimes called an "establishment of religion" in Massachusetts.

The Duke of York had required that every community in his new lands of New York and New Jersey support some church, but this was more often Dutch Reformed, Quaker, or Presbyterian, than Anglican. Some chose to support more than one church. He also ordained that taxpayers were free, having paid local taxes, to choose their church. The terms for the surrender of New Amsterdam had provided that the Dutch would have the liberty of conscience, and the Duke, as an openly divine-right Catholic, was no friend of Anglicanism. The first Anglican minister in New Jersey arrived in 1698, though Anglicanism was more popular in New York.

Connecticut had a real establishment of religion. Its citizens did not adopt a constitution at the Revolution but rather amended their Charter to remove all references to the British Government. As a result, the Congregational Church continued to be established, and Yale College, at that time a Congregational institution, received grants from the State until Connecticut adopted a constitution in 1818 partly because of this issue.

=== Test acts ===
The absence of establishment of religion did not necessarily imply that all men were free to hold office. Most colonies had a Test Act, and several states retained them for a short time. This stood in contrast to the federal Constitution, which explicitly prohibits the employment of any religious test for federal office, and which through the Fourteenth Amendment extended this prohibition to the States.

For example, the New Jersey Constitution of 1776 provides the liberty of conscience in much the same language as Massachusetts (similarly forbidding the payment of "taxes, tithes or other payments" contrary to conscience). It then provides:

That there shall be no establishment of any one religious sect in this Province, in preference to another; and that no Protestant inhabitant of this Colony shall be denied the enjoyment of any civil right, merely on account of his religious principles; but that all persons, professing a belief in the faith of any Protestant sect, who shall demean themselves peaceably under the government, as hereby established, shall be capable of being elected into any office of profit or trust, or being a member of either branch of the Legislature, and shall fully and freely enjoy every privilege and immunity, enjoyed by others their fellow-subjects.

This would permit a Test Act but do not require one.

The original charter of the Province of East Jersey had restricted membership in the Assembly to Christians; the Duke of York was fervently Catholic, and the proprietors of Perth Amboy, New Jersey were Scottish Catholic peers. The Province of West Jersey had declared, in 1681, that there should be no religious test for office. An oath had also been imposed on the militia during the French and Indian War requiring them to abjure the pretensions of the Pope, which may or may not have been applied during the Revolution. That law was replaced by 1799.

The Pennsylvania Constitution of 1776 provided:

And each member, before he takes his seat, shall make and subscribe the following declaration, viz:

I do believe in one God, the creator, and governor of the universe, the rewarder of the good and the punisher of the wicked. And I do acknowledge the Scriptures of the Old and New Testament to be given by Divine inspiration.

And no further or other religious tests shall ever hereafter be required of any civil officer or magistrate in this State.

Again, it provided in general that all tax-paying freemen and their sons shall be able to vote, and that no "man, who acknowledges the being of a God, be justly deprived or abridged of any civil right as a citizen, on account of his religious sentiments or peculiar mode of religious worship."

== The U.S. Constitution ==
=== Article 6 ===
Article Six of the United States Constitution provides that "no religious test shall ever be required as a Qualification to any Office or public Trust under the United States". Before the adoption of the Bill of Rights, this was the only mention of religion in the Constitution.

=== The First Amendment ===
The first amendment to the Constitution reads, "Congress shall make no law respecting an establishment of religion, or prohibiting the free exercise thereof." The two parts, known as the "establishment clause" and the "free exercise clause" respectively, form the textual basis for the Supreme Court's interpretations of the "separation of church and state" principle. Although the phrase "separation of church and state" does not appear in the Constitution, the Establishment Clause has often been interpreted as requiring separation between government and religion. Three central concepts derived from the First Amendment became America's doctrine for church-state separation: no coercion in religious matters, no expectation to support a religion against one's will, and religious liberty encompasses all religions. In sum, citizens are free to embrace or reject a faith, support for religion—financial or physical—must be voluntary, and all religions are equal in the eyes of the law.

The First Congress's deliberations show that its understanding of the separation of church and state differed sharply from that of their contemporaries in Europe. As the 19th-century historian Philip Schaff observed:

The American separation of church and state rests upon respect for the church; the [European anticlerical] separation, on indifference and hatred of the church, and of religion itself... The constitution did not create a nation, nor its religion and institutions. It found them already existing and was framed for the purpose of protecting them under a republican form of government, in a rule of the people, by the people, and for the people.

An August 15, 1789, entry in Madison's papers indicates he intended for the establishment clause to prevent the government imposition of religious beliefs on individuals. The entry says: "Mr. Madison said he apprehended the meaning of the words to be, that Congress should not establish a religion, and enforce the legal observation of it by law, nor compel men to worship God in any manner contrary to their conscience."

Some legal scholars, such as John Baker of LSU, theorize that Madison's initial proposed language—that Congress should make no law regarding the establishment of a "national religion"—was rejected by the House, in favor of the more general "religion" in an effort to appease the Anti-Federalists. To both the Anti-Federalists and the Federalists, the very word "national" was a cause for alarm because of the experience under the British crown. During the debate over the establishment clause, Rep. Elbridge Gerry of Massachusetts took issue with Madison's language regarding whether the government was a national government, or a federal government (in which the states retained their individual sovereignty), which Baker suggests compelled Madison to withdraw his language from the debate.

Following the argument between Madison and Gerry, Representative Samuel Livermore of New Hampshire proposed language stating that "Congress shall make no laws touching religion or the rights of conscience." This raised an uproar from members, such as Representative Benjamin Huntingdon of Connecticut and Representative Peter Sylvester of New York, who worried the language could be used to harm religious practice.

Others, such as Representative Roger Sherman of Connecticut, believed the clause was unnecessary because the original Constitution gave Congress only stated powers, which did not include establishing a national religion. Anti-Federalists such as Representative Thomas Tucker of South Carolina moved to strike the Establishment Clause completely because it could preempt the religious clauses in the state constitutions, but did not persuade the House of Representatives to drop the clause from the First Amendment.

The Senate went through several more narrowly targeted versions before reaching the contemporary language. One version read, "Congress shall make no law establishing one religious sect or society in preference to others, nor shall freedom of conscience be infringed," while another read, "Congress shall make no law establishing one particular religious denomination in preference to others." Ultimately, the Senate rejected the more narrowly targeted language.

At the time of the passage of the Bill of Rights, many states acted in ways that would now be held unconstitutional. All the early official state churches were disestablished by 1833 (Massachusetts), including the Congregationalist establishment in Connecticut. It is commonly accepted that under the doctrine of Incorporation—which uses the Due Process Clause of the Fourteenth Amendment to hold the Bill of Rights applicable to the states—these state churches could not be reestablished today.

Yet the provisions of state constitutions protected religious liberty, particularly the so-called freedom of conscience. During the nineteenth century (and before the incorporation of the First Amendment of the U.S. Constitution through the Fourteenth Amendment), litigants turned to these provisions to challenge Sunday laws (blue laws), bible-reading in schools, and other ostensibly religious regulations.

David Sehat, professor of American Intellectual and Cultural History at Georgia State University, writes that:

But when the First Amendment was ratified in 1791, it did not apply to the states and would not until well into the 20th century. As a result, the First Amendment did not prevent states from paying churches out of the public treasury, as Maryland, Massachusetts, New Hampshire, Vermont, Connecticut, and South Carolina did when that amendment was written. And those states that did not fund churches still favored Christianity. Blasphemy was forbidden in Delaware in 1826, and officeholders in Pennsylvania had to swear that they believed in “the being of a God and a future state of rewards and punishments.” American federalism gave states enormous power to regulate the health, welfare and morals of their citizens. Because many thought religion was the foundation of American society, they used their power to imprint their moral ideals on state constitutions and judicial opinions for much of American history.

=== The Fourteenth Amendment ===
The Fourteenth Amendment to the United States Constitution (Amendment XIV) is one of the post-Civil War amendments intended to secure rights for former slaves. It includes the due process and equal protection clauses among others. The amendment introduces the concept of incorporation of all relevant federal rights against the states. While it has not been fully implemented, the doctrine of incorporation has been used to ensure, through the Due Process Clause and Privileges and Immunities Clause, the application of most of the rights enumerated in the Bill of Rights to the states.

The Supreme Court applied the Free Exercise Clause to the states in Cantwell v. Connecticut (1940). The Establishment Clause was applied to the states in the landmark case Everson v. Board of Education (1947), completing the First Amendment religious Clauses through the Fourteenth Amendment.

The incorporation of the Establishment Clause in Everson v. Board of Education has affected the subsequent interpretation of the separation of church and state in regard to state governments. Although it upheld state law in that case, which provided for public busing to private religious schools, the Supreme Court held that the First Amendment Establishment Clause was fully applicable to state governments. Board of Education of Kiryas Joel Village School District v. Grumet (1994) involved the application of this principle to the states.

== Supreme Court cases ==
Jefferson's concept of "separation of church and state" first became a part of Establishment Clause jurisprudence in Reynolds v. United States, 98 U.S. 145 (1878). In that case, the court examined the history of religious liberty in the US, determining that while the constitution guarantees religious freedom, "The word 'religion' is not defined in the Constitution. We must go elsewhere, therefore, to ascertain its meaning, and nowhere more appropriately, we think, than to the history of the times in the midst of which the provision was adopted." The court found that the leaders in advocating and formulating the constitutional guarantee of religious liberty were Madison and Jefferson. Quoting the "separation" paragraph from Jefferson's letter to the Danbury Baptists, the court concluded that "coming as this does from an acknowledged leader of the advocates of the measure, it may be accepted almost as an authoritative declaration of the scope and effect of the amendment thus secured."

The centrality of the "separation" concept to the Religion Clauses of the Constitution was made explicit in Everson v. Board of Education, 330 U.S. 1 (1947), a case dealing with a New Jersey law that allowed government funds to pay for transportation of students to both public and Catholic schools. This was the first case in which the court applied the Establishment Clause to the laws of a state, having interpreted the due process clause of the Fourteenth Amendment as applying the Bill of Rights to the states as well as the federal legislature. Citing Jefferson, the court concluded that "The First Amendment has erected a wall between church and state. That wall must be kept high and impregnable. We could not approve the slightest breach."

While the decision (with four dissents) upheld the state law allowing the funding of transportation of students to religious schools, the majority opinion (by Justice Hugo Black) and the dissenting opinions (by Justices Wiley Blount Rutledge and Robert H. Jackson) each explicitly stated that the Constitution has erected a "wall between church and state" or a "separation of Church from State": their disagreement was limited to whether this case of state funding of transportation to religious schools breached that wall. Rutledge, on behalf of the four dissenting justices, took the position that the majority had indeed permitted a violation of the wall of separation in this case: "Neither so high nor so impregnable today as yesterday is the wall raised between church and state by Virginia's great statute of religious freedom and the First Amendment, now made applicable to all the states by the Fourteenth." Writing separately, Jackson argued that "there are no good grounds upon which to support the present legislation. In fact, the undertones of the opinion, advocating a complete and uncompromising separation of Church from State, seem utterly discordant with its conclusion yielding support to their commingling in educational matters."

In 1962, the Supreme Court addressed the issue of officially sponsored prayer or religious recitations in public schools. In Engel v. Vitale, 370 U.S. 421 (1962), the Court, by a vote of 6–1, determined it unconstitutional for state officials to compose an official school prayer and require its recitation in public schools, even when the prayer is non-denominational and students may excuse themselves from participation. (The prayer required by the New York State Board of Regents before the Court's decision was: "Almighty God, we acknowledge our dependence upon Thee, and we beg Thy blessings upon us, our parents, our teachers, and our country. Amen.") As the Court stated:

The petitioners contend, among other things, that the state laws requiring or permitting use of the Regents' prayer must be struck down as a violation of the Establishment Clause because that prayer was composed by governmental officials as a part of a governmental program to further religious beliefs. For this reason, petitioners argue, the State's use of the Regents' prayer in its public school system breaches the constitutional wall of separation between Church and State. We agree with that contention, since we think that the constitutional prohibition against laws respecting an establishment of religion must at least mean that, in this country, it is no part of the business of government to compose official prayers for any group of the American people to recite as a part of a religious program carried on by government.

The court noted that it "is a matter of history that this very practice of establishing governmentally composed prayers for religious services was one of the reasons which caused many of our early colonists to leave England and seek religious freedom in America." The lone dissenter, Justice Potter Stewart, objected to the court's embrace of the "wall of separation" metaphor: "I think that the Court's task, in this as in all areas of constitutional adjudication, is not responsibly aided by the uncritical invocation of metaphors like the 'wall of separation,' a phrase nowhere to be found in the Constitution."

In Epperson v. Arkansas, 393 U.S. 97 (1968), the Supreme Court considered an Arkansas law that made it a crime "to teach the theory or doctrine that mankind ascended or descended from a lower order of animals" or "to adopt or use in any such institution a textbook that teaches" this theory in any school or university that received public funds. The court's opinion, by Justice Abe Fortas, ruled that the Arkansas law violated "the constitutional prohibition of state laws respecting an establishment of religion or prohibiting the free exercise thereof. The overriding fact is that Arkansas' law selects from the body of knowledge a particular segment which it proscribes for the sole reason that it is deemed to conflict with a particular religious doctrine; that is, with a particular interpretation of the Book of Genesis by a particular religious group." The court held that the Establishment Clause prohibits the state from advancing any religion, and that "the state has no legitimate interest in protecting any or all religions from views distasteful to them."

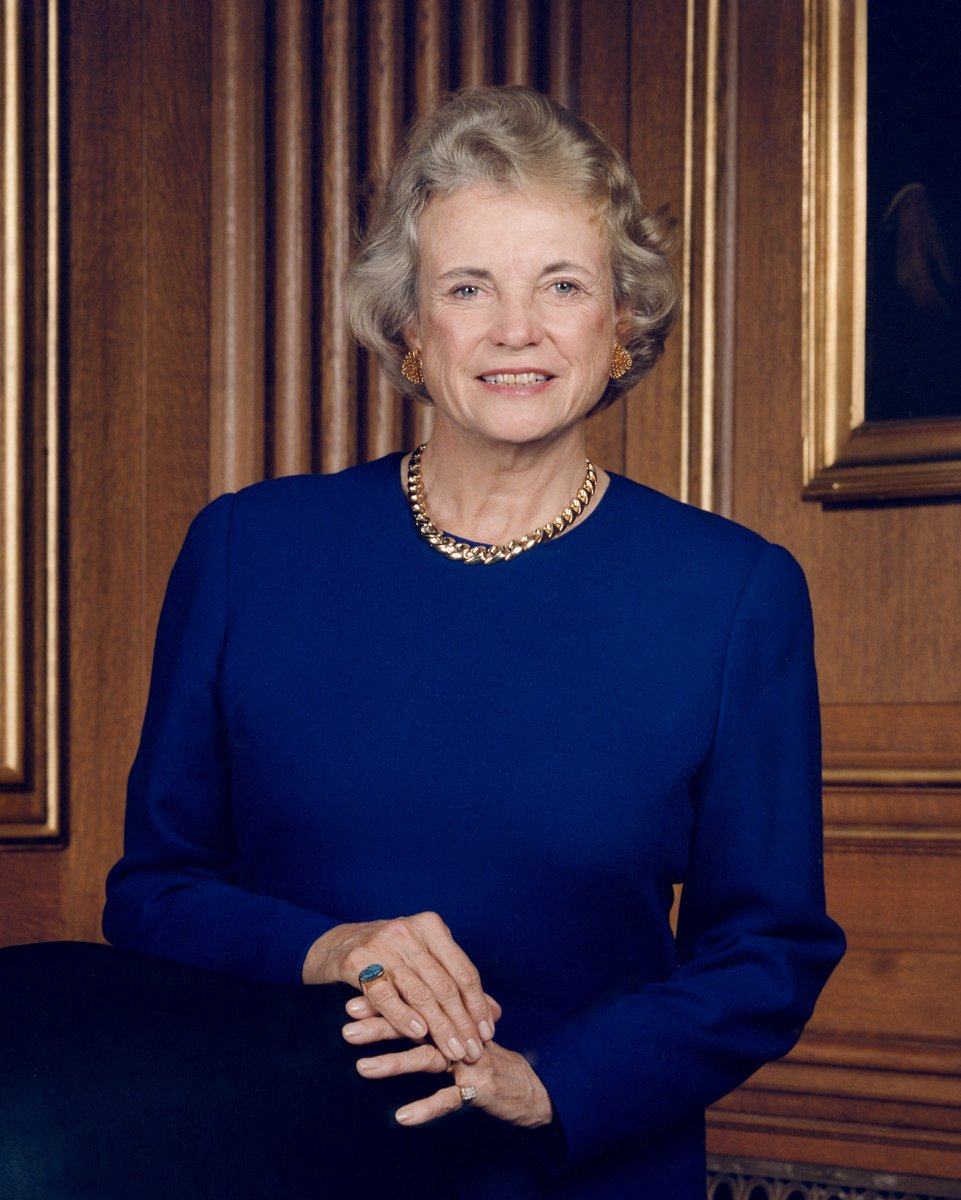
Justice Sandra Day O'Connor

Those who would renegotiate the boundaries between church and state must, therefore, answer a difficult question: Why would we trade a system that has served us so well for one that has served others so poorly?'

— Justice Sandra Day O'Connor in her opinion on the 2005 Ten Commandments ruling.

In Lemon v. Kurtzman, 403 U.S. 602 (1971), the court determined that a Pennsylvania state policy of reimbursing the salaries and related costs of teachers of secular subjects in private religious schools violated the Establishment Clause. The court's decision argued that the separation of church and state could never be absolute: "Our prior holdings do not call for total separation between church and state; total separation is not possible in an absolute sense. Some relationship between government and religious organizations is inevitable," the court wrote. "Judicial caveats against entanglement must recognize that the line of separation, far from being a 'wall', is a blurred, indistinct, and variable barrier depending on all the circumstances of a particular relationship."

Since that decision, the Supreme Court has applied a three-pronged test to determine whether government action comports with the Establishment Clause, known as the "Lemon Test". First, the law or policy must have been adopted with a neutral or non-religious purpose. Second, the principal or primary effect must be one that neither advances nor inhibits religion. Third, the statute or policy must not result in an "excessive entanglement" of government with religion. (The decision in Lemon v. Kurtzman hinged upon the conclusion that the government benefits were flowing disproportionately to Catholic schools, and that Catholic schools were an integral component of the Catholic Church's religious mission, thus the policy involved the state in an "excessive entanglement" with religion.) Failure to meet any of these criteria is a proof that the statute or policy in question violates the Establishment Clause.

In 2002, a three-judge panel on the Ninth Circuit Court of Appeals held that classroom recitation of the Pledge of Allegiance in a California public school was unconstitutional, even when students were not compelled to recite it, due to the inclusion of the phrase "under God". In reaction to the case, Elk Grove Unified School District v. Newdow, both houses of Congress passed measures reaffirming their support for the pledge and condemning the panel's ruling. The case was appealed to the Supreme Court, which overturned the ruling in 2004 on procedural grounds not related to the substantive constitutional issue. Rather, a five-justice majority held that Newdow, a non-custodial parent suing on behalf of his daughter, lacked standing to sue.

When the Louisiana state legislature passed a law requiring public school biology teachers to give Creationism and Evolution equal time in the classroom, the Supreme Court ruled that the law was unconstitutional because it was intended to advance a particular religion, and did not serve the secular purpose of improved scientific education.

The display of the Ten Commandments as part of courthouse displays was considered in a group of cases decided in the summer of 2005, including McCreary County v. ACLU of Kentucky and Van Orden v. Perry. While parties on both sides hoped for a reformulation or clarification of the Lemon test, the two rulings ended with narrow 5–4 and opposing decisions, with Justice Stephen Breyer the swing vote.

On December 20, 2005, the United States Court of Appeals for the Sixth Circuit ruled in the case of ACLU v. Mercer County that the continued display of the Ten Commandments as part of a larger display on American legal traditions in a Kentucky courthouse was allowed, because the purpose of the display (educating the public on American legal traditions) was secular in nature. In the Mount Soledad Cross controversy on May 3, 2006, however, a federal judge ruled that the cross on public property on Mount Soledad must be removed.

In Town of Greece v. Galloway, 12-696, the Supreme Court agreed to hear a case regarding whether prayers at town meetings, which are allowed, must allow various faiths to lead prayer, or whether the prayers can be predominantly Christian. On May 5, 2014, the U.S. Supreme Court ruled 5–4 in favor of the Town of Greece by holding that the U.S. Constitution not only allows for prayer at government meetings, but also for sectarian prayers like predominantly Christian prayers.

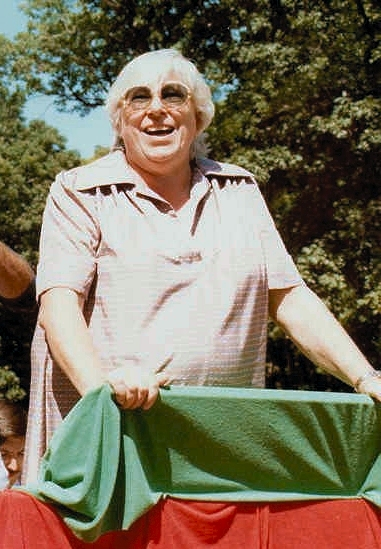
Madalyn Murray O'Hair's 1963 lawsuit led to an end of mandatory prayer in public schools after the Supreme Court declared it unconstitutional.

The Supreme Court in The American Legion v. American Humanist Association 2019 reversed the Fourth Circuit's ruling in a 7–2 decision, determining that since the government-maintained Peace Cross in Bladensburg, Maryland, had stood for decades without controversy, it did not violate the Establishment Clause and could remain standing.

On June 21, 2022, the Supreme Court ruled in a 6–3 vote that the state program that provides tuition to schools should not exclude religious schools and reversed the ban imposed in the state of Maine. Chief Justice John Roberts Jr. said that the issue was the "discrimination against religion" and that the tuition program "promotes stricter separation of church and state than the federal Constitution requires". The three justices who dissented said that "the decision was another step in dismantling the wall of separation between church and state that the framers fought to build.”

In Oklahoma Statewide Charter School Board v. Drummond the court split 4-4.

== Early treaties and court decisions ==
=== The Treaty of Paris ===
In 1783, the United States signed a treaty with Great Britain that was promulgated "in the name of the Most Holy and Undivided Trinity". It credited "'Divine Providence' with having disposed the two parties to 'forget all past misunderstandings,' and is dated 'in the year of our Lord' 1783."

=== The Treaty of Tripoli ===
In 1797, the United States Senate ratified a treaty with Tripoli that stated in Article 11:

As the Government of the United States of America is not, in any sense, founded on the Christian religion; as it has in itself no character of enmity against the laws, religion, or tranquillity, of Mussulmen; and, as the said States never entered into any war or act of hostility against any Mahometan nation, it is declared by the parties, that no pretext arising from religious opinions, shall ever produce an interruption of the harmony existing between the two countries.

Historian Anson Phelps Stokes noted in his 1950 history of this question that "those who wished to deny that the United States as a government has any special regard for the Christian religion...[have ] almost invariably failed to call attention to the fact that the treaty was superseded, less than a decade later, by another 'Treaty of Peace and Amity,' signed in Tripoli June 4, 1805, in which the clause in question...is omitted."

=== Church of the Holy Trinity v. United States ===
In the 1892 case Church of the Holy Trinity v. United States, Supreme Court Justice David Brewer wrote for a unanimous Court that "no purpose of action against religion can be imputed to any legislation, state or national, because this is a religious people. ... [T]his is a Christian nation." Legal historian Paul Finkelman writes that:

Brewer, the son of a Congregationalist missionary to Asia Minor, quoted several colonial charters, state constitutions, and court decisions that referred to the importance of Christian belief in the affairs of the American people; cited the practice of various legislative bodies of beginning their sessions with prayer, and noted the large number of churches and Christian charitable organizations that exist in every community in the country as evidence that this is a Christian nation. In doing so, Brewer expressed the prevailing nineteenth-century Protestant view that America is a Christian nation.

== Interpretive controversies ==
Since the late 20th century, some scholars and organizations disagree with the way the Supreme Court has interpreted the constitutional limitation on religious establishment. Such critics generally argue that many aspects of church and state were intermingled at the time the Constitution was ratified, and that the framers had a different intention than has developed in the more than 200 years since the constitution was written. These critics note that there were religious references in official contexts, and other founding documents, such as the United States Declaration of Independence, reference the idea of a "Creator" and "Nature's God."

Passage of the 14th Amendment in 1868 incorporated recognition that the First Amendment applied to actions by state governments. Many constitutional debates relate to competing interpretive theories of originalism versus modern, progressivist theories such as the doctrine of the Living Constitution. Other debates center on the principle of the law of the land in America being defined not just by the Constitution's Supremacy Clause, but also by legal precedents. This says that interpretations of the Constitution are subject to the morals and values of a given era. It is not a question of historical revisionism when discussing the Constitution.

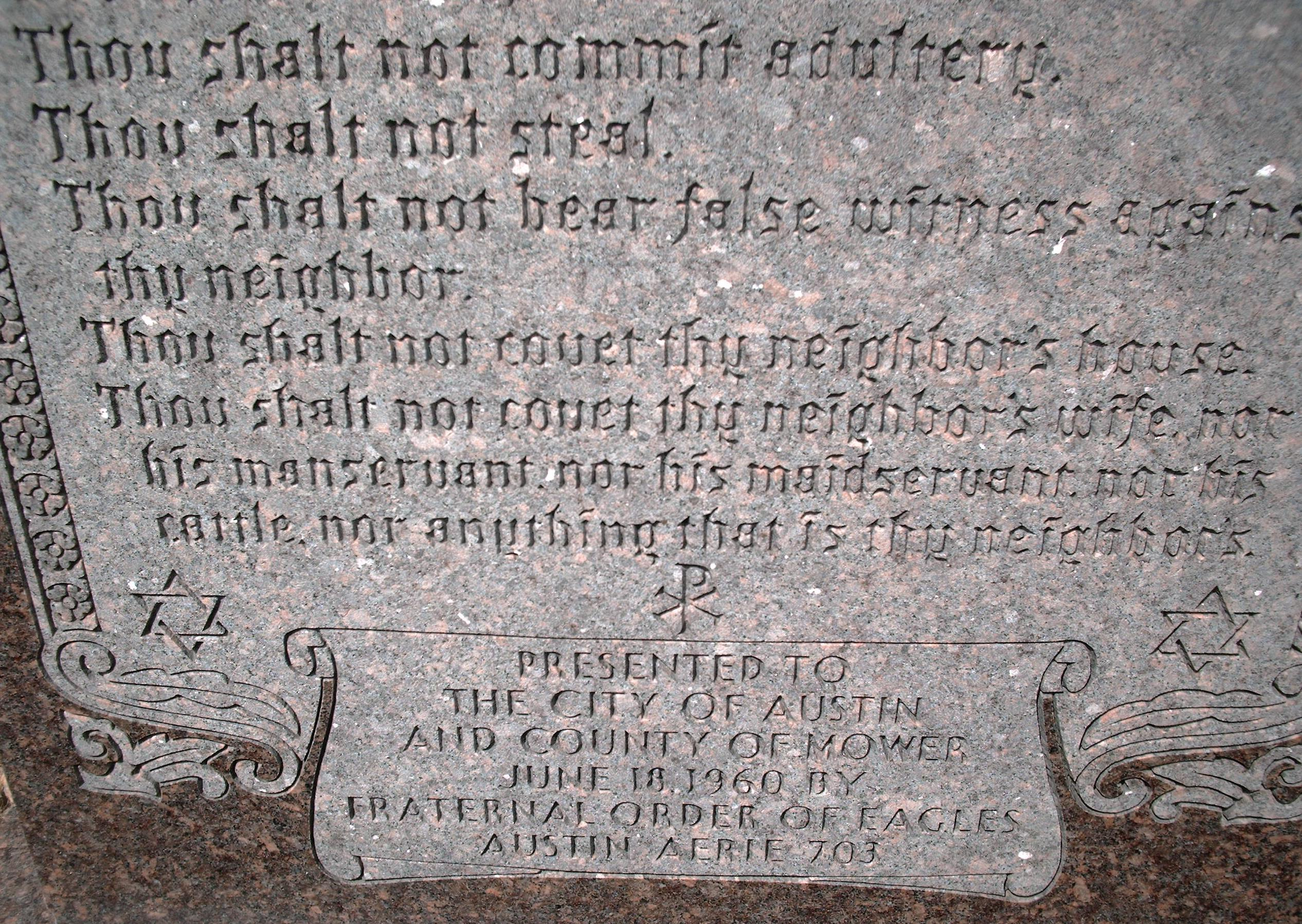
The "Ten Commandments" monument at Mower County Courthouse, Austin, Minnesota

The "religious test" clause has been interpreted to cover both elected and appointed federal officials, career civil servants (a relatively recent innovation), and political appointees. Religious beliefs or the lack of them have not been permissible tests or qualifications with regard to federal employees since the ratification of the Constitution.

States that have religious qualifications for public office written in their constitutions States that do not have religious qualifications for public office written in their constitutions

Seven states, however, included language in their Bill of Rights or Declaration of Rights, or in the body of their constitutions, that require state office-holders to have particular religious beliefs. Some of these have been successfully challenged in court. These states are Massachusetts, Maryland, North Carolina, Pennsylvania, South Carolina, Tennessee, and Texas.

Among the required beliefs is: a Supreme Being and a future state of rewards and punishments. (Tennessee Constitution Article IX, Section 2 is an example of this.) Some of these same states specify that the oath of office include the words "so help me God." In some cases, these oaths were historically required of jurors and witnesses in court. At one time, such restrictions were allowed under the doctrine of states' rights. In the early 21st century, they are deemed to be in violation of the federal First Amendment, as applied to the states via the 14th amendment. They are unconstitutional and unenforceable.

Relaxed zoning rules and special parking privileges for churches, the tax-free status of church property, the designation of Christmas as a federal holiday, etc., have also been questioned. These have continued while considered examples of the governmental prerogative in deciding practical and beneficial arrangements for the society. The national motto "In God We Trust" has been challenged as a violation, but the Supreme Court has ruled that ceremonial deism is not religious in nature. A circuit court ruling in 2001 affirmed Ohio's right to use as its motto a passage from the Bible, "With God, all things are possible", because it displayed no preference for a particular religion.

Jeffries and Ryan (2001) argue that the modern concept of separation of church and state dates from the mid-twentieth century rulings of the Supreme Court. The central point, they argue, was a constitutional ban against aid to religious schools, followed by a later ban on religious observance in public education. Jeffries and Ryan argue that these two propositions—that public aid should not go to religious schools and that public schools should not be religious—make up the separationist position of the modern Establishment Clause.

Jeffries and Ryan argue that the no-aid position drew support from a coalition of separationist opinion. Most important was "the pervasive secularism that came to dominate American public life," which sought to confine religion to a private sphere. The ban against government aid to religious schools was supported before 1970 by most Protestants (and most Jews), who opposed aid to religious schools, which were primarily Catholic at the time.

Originalist critics of the modern concept of the "separation of church and state" argue that it is contrary to the conception of the phrase as the Founding Fathers understood it. But society and the law have changed. In the case of Locke v. Davey (2004), briefs before the Supreme Court, including by the U.S. government, argued that some state constitutional amendments relating to the modern conception of separation of church and state (Blaine Amendments) were motivated by and intended to enact anti-Catholicism.

J. Brent Walker, executive director of the Baptist Joint Committee, has said:

"The fact that the separation of church and state has been supported by some who exhibited an anti-Catholic animus or a secularist bent does not impugn the validity of the principle. Champions of religious liberty have argued for the separation of church and state for reasons having nothing to do with anti-Catholicism or desire for a secular culture. Of course, separationists have opposed the Catholic Church when it has sought to tap into the public till to support its parochial schools or to argue for on-campus released time in the public schools. But that principled debate on the issues does not support a charge of religious bigotry"

Steven Waldman says, "The evangelicals [sic, Baptists and Methodists] provided the political muscle for the efforts of Madison and Jefferson, not merely because they wanted to block official churches but because they wanted to keep the spiritual and secular worlds apart." Frank Lambert wrote "Religious freedom resulted from an alliance of unlikely partners. New Light evangelicals such as Isaac Bachus and John Leland joined forces with Deists and skeptics such as James Madison and Thomas Jefferson to fight for a complete separation of church and state."

James Madison was influenced by the struggle of Baptists in Virginia before the Revolution, where young men were jailed for preaching without a license from the Anglican Church. As a young lawyer, Madison defended such men in court. Both Madison and Jefferson incorporated religious freedom into the state constitution of Virginia.

Judge Charles C. Haynes wrote an OpEd in 2013 in The Washington Post, saying:

For James Madison, Thomas Jefferson and other early supporters of church-state separation, authentic religious liberty requires that government remain neutral toward religion while simultaneously upholding the right of religious people and institutions to participate fully in the public square of America. Ignoring the role of religion ... is hardly "neutral." On the contrary, such exclusion sends a message of government hostility to the religious. The First Amendment does not guarantee atheists or anyone else "freedom from religion." Frequent exposure to religious symbols and messages is inevitable in our religiously diverse society. The First Amendment does, however, guarantee “freedom from government-imposed religion” – a core condition of liberty of conscience.

=== Politics and religion in the United States ===
A map of U.S. states with display of the national motto in public schools and government buildings as of August 2022 Display in schools mandated Display in at least some government buildings mandated Display in schools mandated if a copy of the motto is donated Display in schools allowed Display in government buildings allowed

Robert N. Bellah has written that, although the separation of church and state is grounded firmly in the U.S. Constitution, this does not mean that there is no religious dimension in U.S. political society. He used the term "civil religion" to describe the specific relation between politics and religion in the U.S. His 1967 article analyzes John F. Kennedy's inaugural speech: "Considering the separation of church and state, how is a president justified in using the word 'God' at all? The answer is that the separation of church and state has not denied the political realm a religious dimension."

In 2013, the House of Representatives voted overwhelmingly to retain "In God We Trust" as the official motto of the United States. Only nine members of Congress, eight Democrats and a Republican, voted against the resolution.

A May 2022 study found that the strongest support for declaring the U.S. a Christian nation comes from Republicans who identify as Evangelical or born-again Christians. Of this group, 78% favor formally declaring the U.S. a Christian nation, versus only 48% of Republicans overall. Age is also a factor, with over 70% of Republicans from the Baby Boomer and Silent Generations supporting the United States officially becoming a Christian nation. According to Politico, the polling also found that sentiments of white grievance are highly correlated with Christian nationalism: "White respondents who say that members of their race have faced more discrimination than others are most likely to embrace a Christian America. Roughly 59% of all Americans who say white people have been discriminated against ... favor declaring the U.S. a Christian nation, compared to 38% of all Americans."

Justice Clarence Thomas has disputed that the Establishment Clause applies to the States, believing it constitutional for states to establish a state religion.

In 2013, North Carolina politicians proposed a bill that could have seen North Carolina establish an official religion for the state. A 2013 YouGov poll found that 34% of people favored establishing Christianity as the official state religion in their own state, 47% opposed it, and 19% were undecided.

In June 2022, Representative Lauren Boebert told a church audience, "The church is supposed to direct the government. The government is not supposed to direct the church. That is not how our Founding Fathers intended it. And I am tired of this separation of church and state junk. It's not in the Constitution."

The Ten Commandments in a Texas High School, marked with a pride flag sticker.

In June 2024, Louisiana Governor Jeff Landry signed into law Louisiana House Bill 71, mandating that schools that receive public funding display a copy of the Ten Commandments. Several organizations, such as the American Civil Liberties Union, have sharply criticized this policy, and multiple lawsuits have been filed against the bill. In 2025, Arkansas and Texas passed similar bills, as did Alabama in 2026.

== See also ==
- Ban on Sharia law
- Center for Faith and Opportunity Initiatives – U.S. office within the White House Office
- Christian amendment – Proposed constitutional amendments
- Johnson Amendment – U.S. tax code rule regarding non-profit organizations
- Pledge of Allegiance (United States) – Loyalty oath to the flag and republic of the U.S.
- United States religious history
- House Bill 71 – Louisiana law directing schools to display the Ten Commandments
- List of American politicians with religious occupations

== Bibliography ==
- Barry McGowan, How to Separate Church & State: A Manual from the Trenches Hufton Mueller, LLC, 2012 ISBN 978-0-615-63802-7
- Philip Hamburger, Separation of Church and State Harvard University Press, 2002. ISBN 0-674-00734-4 OCLC: 48958015
- Marci A. Hamilton, God vs. the Gavel: Religion and the Rule of Law, Cambridge University Press, 2005, ISBN 0-521-85304-4
- Mark DeWolfe Howe. The Garden and the Wilderness: Religion and Government in American Constitutional History(U. of Chicago Press, 1965)
- Daniel L. Dreisbach. Thomas Jefferson and the Wall of Separation Between Church and State (New York University Press, 2003)
- Daniel L. Dreisbach and Mark David Hall. The Sacred Rights of Conscience: Selected Readings on Religious Liberty and Church-State Relations in the American Founding (Indianapolis: Liberty Fund Press, 2009)
- Daniel L. Dreisbach, Mark David Hall, and Jeffry Morrison. The Forgotten Founders on Religion and Public Life (Notre Dame: University of Notre Dame Press, 2009)
- John C. Jeffries Jr. and James E. Ryan, "A Political History of the Establishment Clause," 100 Michigan Law Rev. (2001) online version
- Mark David Hall, "Jeffersonian Walls and Madisonian Lines: The Supreme Court's Use of History in Religion Clause Cases," 85 Oregon Law Review (2006), 563–614. http://www.law.uoregon.edu/org/olr/archives/85/852hall.pdf
- Isaac Kramnick and R. Laurence Moore, The Godless Constitution: The Case Against Religious Correctness (Norton, 1996)
- Philip B. Kurland, ed., Church and State: The Supreme Court and the First Amendment (U. of Chicago Press, 1975)
- Samaha, Adam M. (2002). "Separation of Church and State". Constitutional Commentary. 19 (3): 713+. Archived from the original on October 16, 2007 – via Questia.
- Anson P. Stokes and Leo Pfeffer, Church and State in the United States (reprint, 1964)
- Kyle G. Volk, Moral Minorities and the Making of American Democracy (Oxford University Press, 2014)
- Jay Wexler, Holy Hullabaloos: A Road Trip to the Battlegrounds of the Church/State Wars (Beacon Press, 2009) ISBN 9780807000441
- Jay Wexler, Our Non-Christian Nation: How Wiccans, Satanists, Atheists, and Others Are Demanding Their Rightful Place in Public Life (Stanford Univ. Press, 2019) ISBN 9780804798990
