= Espinoza v. Montana Department of Revenue =

- Supreme Court of the United States

Argued January 22, 2020 Decided June 30, 2020
- Full case name: Kendra Espinoza, et al. v. Montana Department of Revenue, et al.
- Docket no.: 18-1195
- Citations: 591 U.S. 464 (more) 140 S. Ct. 2246; 207 L. Ed. 2d 679
- Argument: Oral argument

Case history
- Prior: Espinoza v. Montana Dep't of Revenue, 2018 MT 306, 393 Mont. 446, 435 P.3d 603; cert. granted, 139 S. Ct. 2777 (2019).

Holding
- The application of the no-aid provision discriminated against religious schools and the families whose children attend or hope to attend them in violation of the Free Exercise Clause of the Federal Constitution.

Court membership
- Chief Justice John Roberts Associate Justices Clarence Thomas · Ruth Bader Ginsburg; Stephen Breyer · Samuel Alito; Sonia Sotomayor · Elena Kagan; Neil Gorsuch · Brett Kavanaugh

Case opinions
- Majority: Roberts, joined by Thomas, Alito, Gorsuch, Kavanaugh
- Concurrence: Thomas, joined by Gorsuch
- Concurrence: Alito
- Concurrence: Gorsuch
- Dissent: Ginsburg, joined by Kagan
- Dissent: Breyer, joined by Kagan (Part I)
- Dissent: Sotomayor

Laws applied
- U.S. Const. amend. I

Espinoza v. Montana Department of Revenue, 591 U.S. 464 (2020), is a landmark United States Supreme Court decision that a state-based scholarship program that provides public funds to allow students to attend private schools cannot discriminate against religious schools under the Free Exercise Clause of the Constitution.

== Background ==
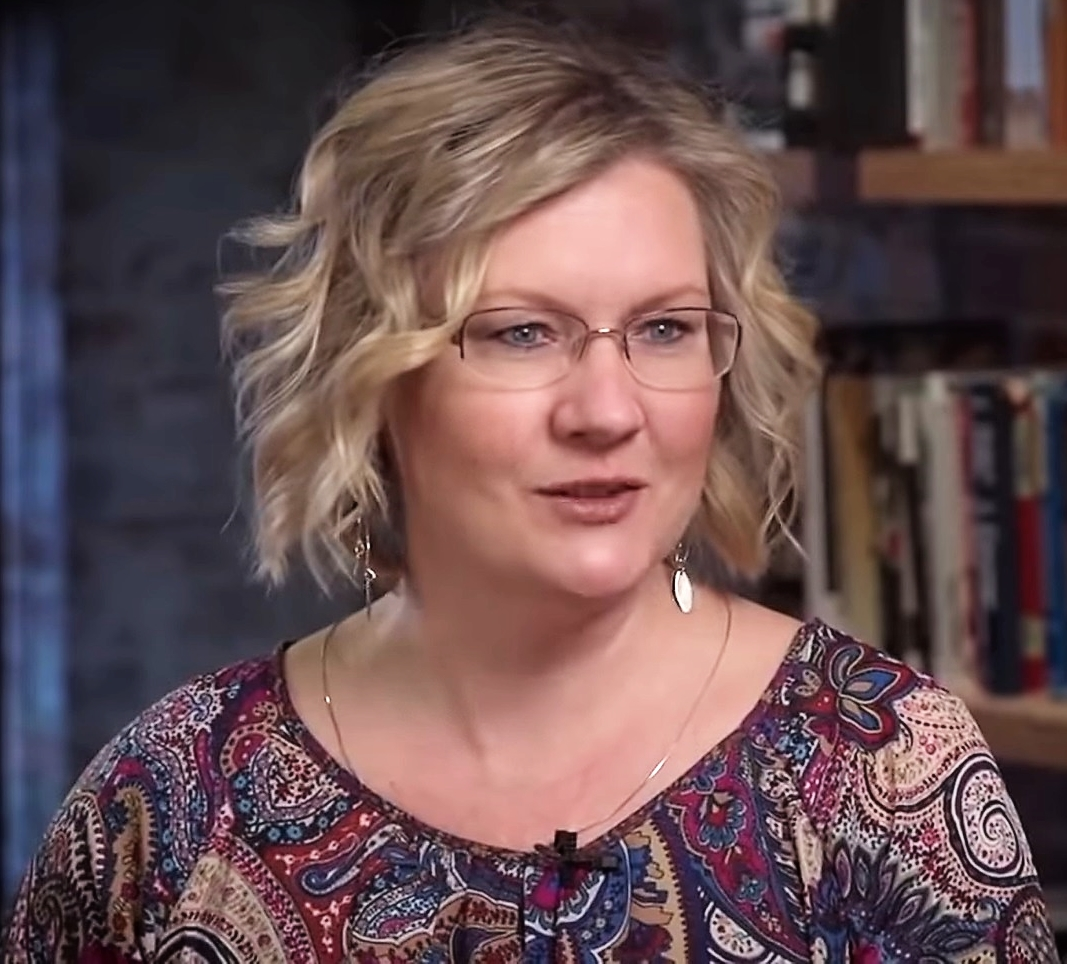
Kendra Espinoza, primary plaintiff, on Reason TV in 2020

The state of Montana passed a special income tax credit program in 2015 to help fund non-profit scholarship organizations to help low-income families pay for private schools. For tax payers, they were able to pay up to US$150 into the program and receive a dollar-for-dollar state tax credit to support it. This type of tax-credit scholarship program for private school selection is similar to ones in 23 other states as of 2025.

Montana, as with 37 other states, have so-called Blaine amendments in their constitutions which were originally designed to prevent funding Catholic schools in the 19th century. Jonathan A. Greenblatt, chief executive of the Anti-Defamation League, said that the continued purpose of these Blaine amendments "serve significant government interests — leaving the support of churches to church members, while also protecting houses of worship against discrimination and interference from the government."

In Mitchell v. Helms, however, a four-justice plurality of the Supreme Court cast Blaine Amendments in a decidedly less positive light, describing them as "born of bigotry" and deserving to "be buried."

Montana's constitution bars the uses of "any direct or indirect appropriations or payment" to any religious organizations or schools affiliated with religious organizations, also known as the "no-aid" provision. The Montana Department of Revenue (DoR) developed the program's rules around the no-aid provision and disallowed scholarship recipients from choosing to attend religious-affiliated schools, otherwise known as "Rule 1". Rule 1 was controversial even within the state government, as both state legislators and the attorney general had asserted it was not needed, but the DoR implemented it against their cautions, asserting that the scholarship funds were equivalent to appropriations and thus covered by the no-aid provision.

Three low-income families who had children attended Stillwater Christian School in Flathead County and would have been eligible for scholarships through the program filed a lawsuit against the state and sought an injunction against Rule 1, asserting that the rule was unnecessary under the state constitution and, moreover, violated the First Amendment to the U.S. Constitution. Their lawsuit was litigated by the Institute for Justice, a non-profit organization that has fought against state laws that enforce the Blaine amendments in their constitutions. In April 2016, they obtained an injunction to block the DoR from enforcing the rule. The state began to appeal this ruling, but otherwise continued the program with the ordered injunction, which allowed additional scholarships to be granted for several children attending Stillwater.

The state's appeal to the Montana Supreme Court was decided in December 2018, and the court ruled in a 5–2 decision that the entire program was unconstitutional because it benefited religious schools. The Court majority stated that the "[Constitution of Montana] more broadly prohibits 'any' state aid to sectarian schools and draws a more stringent line than that drawn by [the U.S. Constitution]." Further, the Court found that even with the DoR's Rule 1 in place, the program still could not prevent any type of aid from the program from ending up at a religious school, and thus nullified the entire program.

== Supreme Court ==
The families petitioned to the United States Supreme Court for review, arguing that the Montana Supreme Court's decision to terminate the program violated the Religion Clauses and Equal Protection Clause of the U.S. Constitution. The Supreme Court granted certiorari in June 2019.

Oral arguments were heard on January 22, 2020. The Justices focused on whether the Montana Supreme Court's decision to shut down the entire program was discriminatory towards the sectarian schools and the families who chose to attend them, as well as trying to resolve this case with recent decisions related to the Free Exercise Clause, such as Trinity Lutheran Church of Columbia, Inc. v. Comer, in which the Court previously ruled that blocking public funds to be used by a church to improve playground safety was a violation of the Free Exercise Clause.

=== Majority opinion ===
The Court issued its decision on June 30, 2020. The 5–4 decision reversed the Montana Supreme Court's ruling and remanded the case. Chief Justice John Roberts wrote for the majority, joined by Justices Clarence Thomas, Samuel Alito, Neil Gorsuch, and Brett Kavanaugh. Roberts wrote in his opinion that the no-aid provision violated the Free Exercise clause, as it "bars religious schools from public benefits solely because of the religious character of the schools" and "also bars parents who wish to send their children to a religious school from those same benefits, again solely because of the religious character of the school." Roberts also asserted that the Montana Supreme Court was wrong to invalidate the entire program on the basis of the no-aid provision in the state constitution. Roberts wrote that "A state need not subsidize private education. But once a state decides to do so, it cannot disqualify some private schools solely because they are religious." Roberts based part of the majority's opinion on the previous Trinity case where the public funds were used for a non-sectarian purpose (church playground improvement), while contrasting it from the decision of Locke v. Davey, where the Court found that preventing the use of public scholarship funds for students entering into studies to prepare for religious ministry was constitutional.

=== Concurrences ===
Justice Thomas wrote his own concurrence which was joined by Gorsuch. Although he agreed with the judgement, Thomas maintained that the Court's past approach to the Establishment Clause was responsible for "hamper[ing] free exercise rights," and he argued that "[r]eturning the Establishment Clause to its proper scope... will go a long way toward allowing free exercise of religion to flourish as the Framers intended."

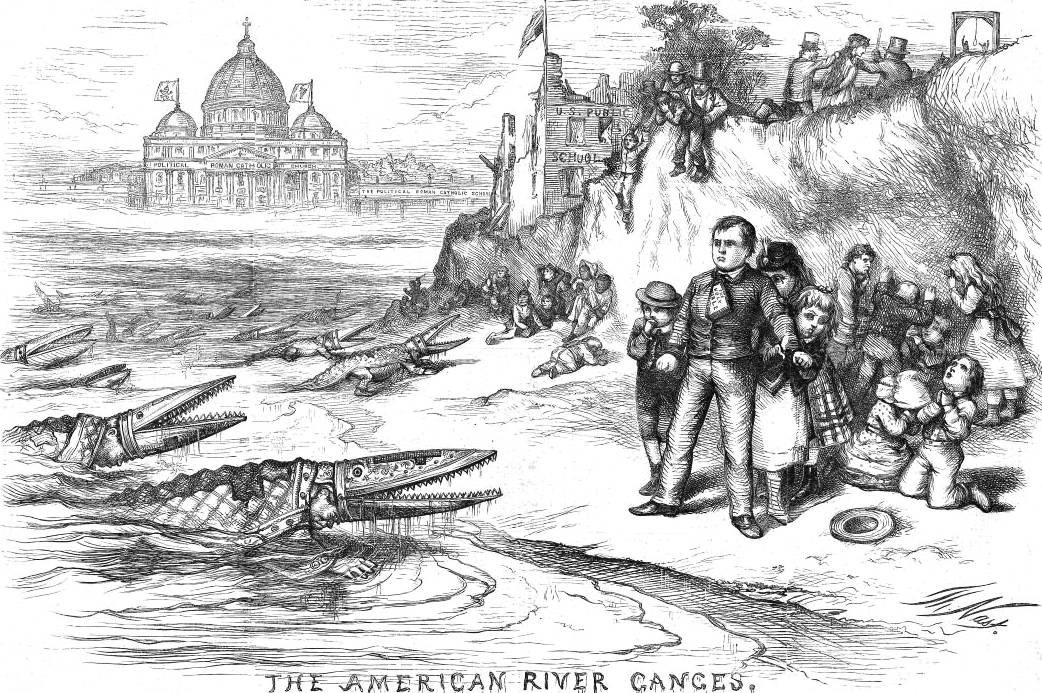
Alito's concurrent discussed the history of the Blaine amendments, including mention of the 1871 political cartoon by Thomas Nast "The American River Ganges".

Justice Alito also concurred. Alito cited the Court's earlier decision in Ramos v. Louisiana, in which judgement was partially based on the motivation of outdated Jim Crow laws in the nature of jury verdicts. Alito wrote that the no-aid provision in Montana's constitution must be considered the same way: "Montana's no-aid provision was modeled on the failed Blaine Amendment to the Constitution, which was prompted by virulent prejudice against Catholic immigrants. Montana's claim that the provision merely reflects a state interest in preserving public schools ignores that the public-school (or common-school) movement at the time was itself anti-Catholic. It is also not clear that the anti-Catholic animus was scrubbed from the no-aid provision when it was re-adopted at Montana's constitutional convention in 1972."

Justice Gorsuch also wrote a concurrence, emphasizing that the Free Exercise Clause "protects not just the right to be a religious person, holding beliefs inwardly and secretly; it also protects the right to act on those beliefs outwardly and publicly. Our cases have long recognized the importance of protecting religious actions, not just religious status."

=== Dissents ===
Separate dissents were written by Justices Ruth Bader Ginsburg, Stephen Breyer, and Sonia Sotomayor, with Justice Elena Kagan joining on both Ginsburg and Breyer's dissents. Ginsburg, in her dissent, acknowledged to Roberts' point that states are not required to subsidize private education and in the case of Montana, their court discontinued the program, which does not affect the Free Exercise Clause. She wrote, "Petitioners may still send their children to a religious school... There simply are no scholarship funds to be had." Sotomayor called the majority's ruling "perverse" in requiring Montana "to reinstate a tax-credit program that the Constitution did not demand in the first place."

== Impact ==
The Espinoza decision was considered likely to impact subsequent rules in the 37 states with Blaine amendments. At the time of the decision, 17 states had scholarship programs similar to Montana's. However, some of these, including Florida and Indiana, already permitted such funds to be used for parents' selection of religious schools, despite no-aid clauses in their constitutions. The Institute for Justice, which represented the parents, used the ruling to successfully challenge similar prohibitions against religiously affiliated educational options for parents in Maine and Vermont which blocked the parents' use of such funds.

== See also ==
- Trinity Lutheran Church of Columbia, Inc. v. Comer, 582 U.S. 449 (2017), a precursor to Espinoza
- Carson v. Makin, 596 U.S. 767 (2022), a follow-up to Espinoza
- Oklahoma Statewide Charter School Board v. Drummond
