= Catholic schools in the United States =

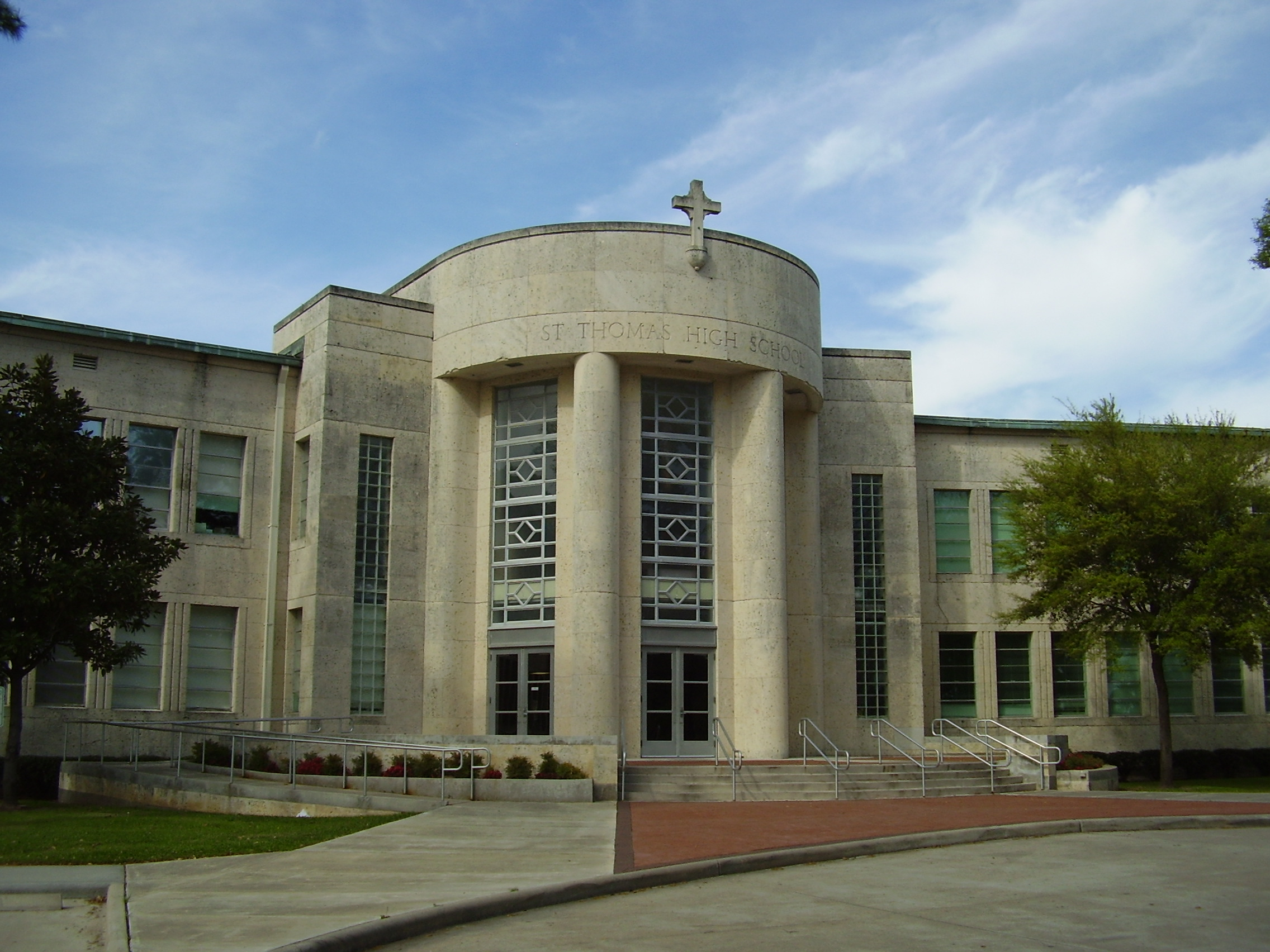
St. Thomas High School, a Catholic high school in Houston

Catholic schools in the United States constitute the largest number of private Christian schools nationwide, also called parochial schools. They are accredited by independent and/or U.S. state education agencies, and teachers are generally state certified teachers, some may also be religious (Brothers, Sisters) and in Holy Orders (priests). Catholic schools are supported primarily through tuition payments and fundraising, and typically enroll students irrespective of their religious background. Most are associated with a diocese and often a parish, and generally require the permission of the local Catholic bishop to operate.

== History ==
By the middle of the 19th century, Catholics in larger cities started building their own parochial school system. The main impetus was fear that indoctrination by Protestant teachers in the public schools would lead to a loss of faith. Protestants reacted by strong opposition to any public funding of parochial schools. Catholics nevertheless built their elementary schools, parish by parish, using very low paid sisters without college educations as teachers. This was not unlike the public school system, where college-educated teachers became the norm only in the 20th century.

By the 2010s, there had been a significant decline in the number of Catholic schools in the United States: From 2000 to 2012, 1,755 Catholic schools closed across the country.

=== Segregation ===
Initially, Catholic schools in the South generally followed the pattern of racial segregation in public schools, where segregation was usually required by law. However, most Catholic dioceses began moving ahead of public schools to desegregate. Prior to the desegregation of public schools, St. Louis was the first city to desegregate its Catholic schools in 1947. Following this, Catholic schools followed in Mississippi (1965), Atlanta (1962), Tennessee (1954), and Washington, DC (1948). Due to different integration plans in different locations, some schools decided to desegregate before public schools in their own communities. The first African American Catholic schools were established in states with large Catholic populations and a history of slavery, such as Maryland and Louisiana.

== Operation ==
Most Catholic elementary schools are operated by a local parish community, while secondary schools are usually operated by a diocese or archdiocese, or a religious institute, and often those in major cities are also attached to a Catholic university.

In the United States, the term parochial school is commonly used to refer to Catholic schools, to distinguish them from private schools (which can refer to either a nonsectarian school or a church-based school).

Most elementary schools are owned by a particular parish, while high schools are often owned by a group of parishes (more common in the South), a religious institute (more common in the Northeast), or a diocese. In the West, a mixture of schools operated by dioceses and religious institutes is common, with the older schools generally run by such institutes. Except in the case of independent schools, local priests are invariably members of the school board, and often at secondary schools are found among the teaching staff as well. In some dioceses the bishop holds the title of superintendent, while others have delegated this responsibility to the head of the Office of Catholic Schools. In terms of practicality, it is often the local priests who fulfill this function.

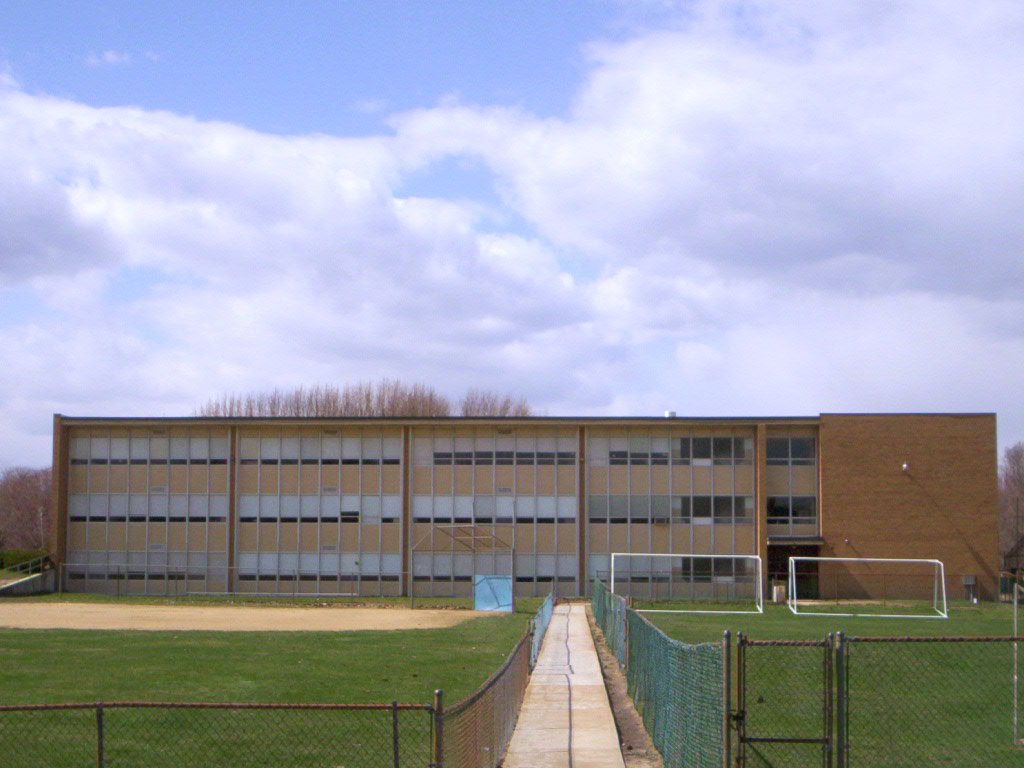
Mater Dei High School, a small Catholic high school in New Jersey

Most Catholic elementary schools tend to be smaller than their public counterparts, and it is not unusual for such schools to have only one teacher and classroom per grade level. Additionally, grade levels often separated between elementary and middle schools (in the public schools) are generally not separated in Catholic schools; thus a student may attend the same school from kindergarten or first grade through eighth grade. One other major difference is that in most parts of the country, public schools provide bus service to their students, while Catholic schools rarely do.

== Entrance requirements ==
Most Catholic schools in the United States accept students of all religions, ethnic backgrounds, and ability, with a minority expecting students to actually be Catholic. Some Catholic schools are more relaxed in their expectation of a largely Catholic student body, due to the demographic proportion of Catholics being especially low in some areas. More competitive Catholic secondary schools tend to have tighter academic requirements and/or an entrance exam. It is a common expectation that non-Catholic students take religion classes and participate as fully as possible in the spiritual exercises of the school. Many schools have a policy (sometimes written) banning proselytizing in any form.

== Enrollment ==
The United States had 7,498 Catholic schools in 2006–07, including 6,288 elementary schools and 1,210 secondary schools. In total there were 2,320,651 students, including 1,682,412 students in the elementary/middle schools and 638,239 in high schools. Enrollment in the nation's Catholic schools has steadily dropped to less than half of its peak at five million students 40 years ago, The New York Times reported in early 2009. At its peak in 1965, the number of U.S. parochial schools was more than 12,000, and roughly half of all Catholic children in America attended Catholic elementary schools, according to the National Catholic Educational Association. The same share in 2009 is about 15 percent. Among Latinos, the fastest-growing church group — soon to comprise a majority of Catholics in the United States — it is three percent. The article also reported on "dozens of local efforts" to turn the tide, including by the Archdiocese of Chicago and Washington, and dioceses in Memphis and Wichita, Kansas, as well as in the New York metro area.

== Public funding debate ==
Heavily Protestant in the 19th century, most states passed a state constitutional amendment, referred to as the Blaine Amendment, forbidding tax money be used to fund parochial schools, a possible outcome of heavy immigration from Catholic Ireland after the 1840s. In 2002, the United States Supreme Court partially vitiated these amendments, in theory, when they ruled that vouchers were constitutional if tax dollars followed a child to a school, even if it were religious. However, no state had, by 2009, changed its laws to allow this.

Since 2000, 1,942 Catholic schools around the country have shut their doors, and enrollment has dropped by 621,583 students, to just over 2 million in 2012, according to the National Catholic Educational Association. Many Catholic schools are being squeezed out of the education market by financial issues and publicly funded charter schools. Ohio is currently funding new private Catholic schools.

== Catholic Schools Week ==
Since 1974, National Catholic Schools Week within the United States begins the last Sunday of January. Schools celebrate their Catholic identity and mission in service.

== See also ==
- Catholic Church in the United States
- History of the Catholic Church in the United States
- History of education in New York City
