= Sandoz Inc. v. Amgen Inc. =

- Supreme Court of the United States

Decided June 12, 2017
- Full case name: Sandoz Inc. v. Amgen Inc.
- Docket no.: 15-1039
- Citations: 582 U.S. 1 (more)

Holding
- Section 262(l)(2)(A) of the Biologics Price Competition and Innovation Act of 2009 is not enforceable by injunction under federal law. An applicant may provide notice under Section 262(l)(8)(A) prior to obtaining licensure.

Court membership
- Chief Justice John Roberts Associate Justices Anthony Kennedy · Clarence Thomas; Ruth Bader Ginsburg · Stephen Breyer; Samuel Alito · Sonia Sotomayor; Elena Kagan · Neil Gorsuch

Case opinion
- Majority: Thomas, joined by unanimous

Laws applied
- Biologics Price Competition and Innovation Act of 2009

Sandoz Inc. v. Amgen Inc., 582 U.S. 1 (2017), was a United States Supreme Court case in which the court held that Section 262(l)(2)(A) of the Biologics Price Competition and Innovation Act of 2009 is not enforceable by injunction under federal law. An applicant may provide notice under Section 262(l)(8)(A) prior to obtaining licensure.
