= Trinity Lutheran Church of Columbia, Inc. v. Comer =

- Supreme Court of the United States

Argued April 19, 2017 Decided June 26, 2017
- Full case name: Trinity Lutheran Church of Columbia, Inc., Petitioner v. Carol S. Comer, Director, Missouri Department of Natural Resources
- Docket no.: 15-577
- Citations: 582 U.S. 449 (more) 137 S. Ct. 2012; 198 L. Ed. 2d 551; 2017 U.S. LEXIS 4061; 2017 WL 2722410
- Argument: Oral argument
- Decision: Opinion

Case history
- Prior: 976 F. Supp. 2d 1137 (W.D. Mo. 2013); 788 F.3d 779 (8th Cir. 2015); cert. granted, 136 S. Ct. 891 (2016).

Holding
- Missouri's policy violated the rights of Trinity Lutheran under the Free Exercise Clause by denying the church an otherwise available public benefit on account of its religious status.

Court membership
- Chief Justice John Roberts Associate Justices Anthony Kennedy · Clarence Thomas; Ruth Bader Ginsburg · Stephen Breyer; Samuel Alito · Sonia Sotomayor; Elena Kagan · Neil Gorsuch

Case opinions
- Majority: Roberts, joined by Kennedy, Alito, Kagan; Thomas, Gorsuch (except footnote 3)
- Concurrence: Thomas (in part), joined by Gorsuch
- Concurrence: Gorsuch (in part), joined by Thomas
- Concurrence: Breyer (in judgment)
- Dissent: Sotomayor, joined by Ginsburg

Laws applied
- U.S. Const. amend. I

Trinity Lutheran Church of Columbia, Inc. v. Comer, 582 U.S. 449 (2017), was a case in which the Supreme Court of the United States held that a Missouri program that denied a grant to a religious school for playground resurfacing, while providing grants to similarly situated non-religious groups, violated the Free Exercise Clause of the First Amendment to the United States Constitution.

== Background ==
The original 1820 constitution of Missouri contained a provision prohibiting tax dollars from funding the construction of churches or the salaries of ministers, in like manner to the Virginia Statute for Religious Freedom. In 1870, controversy over Catholic schools in St. Louis led Missouri to adopt a constitutional amendment prohibiting any funding of a school “controlled by any creed, church, or sectarian denomination whatever.” In 1875, Missouri adopted a new constitution that carried forward the provision prohibiting parochial school funding, and adding a section declaring “no money shall ever be taken from the public treasury, directly or indirectly, in aid of any church, sect or denomination of religion”. In 1876, the Blaine Amendment to the United States Constitution, which sought to combat the perceived threat Catholics posed to the nation's Protestant character by prohibiting public funding of parochial schools, failed.

Trinity Lutheran Church operates a licensed preschool and daycare in Columbia, Missouri that was initially opened as a non-profit corporation but merged with the church in 1985. The preschool and daycare has an open admissions policy and incorporates daily religious instruction into its programs. The Missouri Department of Natural Resources offers grants that provide funds for qualifying organizations to purchase recycled tires to resurface playgrounds. Trinity applied for such a grant. The state gave out fourteen such grants that year, and graded the church's application with the fifth highest score, but denied the grant, citing the 1875 provision requiring no state aid of churches.

The church brought suit in the United States District Court for the Western District of Missouri, arguing that the denial of its application violated the Equal Protection Clause as well as the First Amendment's protections of freedom of religion and speech. On September 26, 2013, District Judge Nanette Kay Laughrey granted DNR Director Sarah Parker Pauly's motion to dismiss for failure to state a claim. Trinity moved for reconsideration and to amend its complaint to include allegations that such grants had previously been given to religious organizations, which the District Court then denied.

On May 29, 2015, United States Court of Appeals for the Eighth Circuit Judge James B. Loken, joined by Judge Michael Joseph Melloy, affirmed the District Court, over the partial dissent of Judge Raymond Gruender. On August 11, 2015, a rehearing en banc was denied by an equally divided circuit, with Judges Gruender, William J. Riley, Lavenski Smith, Steven Colloton, and Bobby Shepherd voting to review.

On January 15, 2016, the Supreme Court of the United States granted the Church's petition for a writ of certiorari, certifying the question of, "Whether the exclusion of churches from an otherwise neutral and secular aid program violates the Free Exercise Clause and the Equal Protection Clause when the state has no valid Establishment Clause concern." Justice Neil Gorsuch joined the Court twelve days before the case was argued in April 2017. Six days before oral argument, Eric Greitens, Missouri's new Republican governor, issued a press release announcing that the DNR had been told to allow religious organizations to compete for the tire scrap grants. One day before oral argument, Josh Hawley, Missouri's new Republican Attorney General, recused himself and announced that the state's former solicitor general would instead argue the case for the state. On April 19, 2017, one hour of oral arguments were heard, where an attorney from the Alliance Defending Freedom appeared for the church and the former Missouri solicitor general appeared for that state.

== Opinion of the court ==
On June 26, 2017, the last day of the term, the Supreme Court delivered judgment in favor of the church, with seven justices voting to reverse the court below. Chief Justice John Roberts, in an opinion joined fully by Justices Anthony Kennedy, Samuel Alito, and Elena Kagan, and partially by Justices Clarence Thomas and Neil Gorsuch, wrote that the state violated the First Amendment by denying a public benefit to an otherwise eligible recipient solely on account of its religious status, calling it "odious to our Constitution" to exclude the church from the grant program, even though the consequences are only "a few extra scraped knees".

The Court read McDaniel v. Paty, 435 U.S. 618 (1978), in which a plurality of Justices had found that ministers could not be disqualified from becoming delegates to a state constitutional convention, as holding that special disabilities imposed due to religious status are subject to strict scrutiny. The Court then found that Missouri's treatment of the church as a church discriminated against it due to its religious status.

The Chief Justice stopped short of a more blanket ruling, adding a footnote to clarify that the case "involves express discrimination based on religious identity with respect to playground resurfacing" and that the Court was not addressing "religious uses of funding or other forms of discrimination". Justices Thomas and Gorsuch did not join this footnote in the opinion.

The Court noted that Locke v. Davey, 540 U.S. 712 (2004) upheld the state of Washington's decision not to fund students seeking degrees in devotional theology as part of a state scholarship program, but said the state did not want to force students to give up their religious views; for instance, the scholarships could be used at religious schools. Missouri could not rely on Locke here, the Court explained, because devotional theology is an essentially religious endeavor while playground resurfacing is not. While the state may discriminate against funding activities for being religious, it cannot discriminate against persons simply for being religious. Finally, the Court found that the discrimination against the church failed strict scrutiny because Missouri did not have a compelling government interest in enforcing a stricter separation of church and state than that found already in the U.S. Constitution.

=== Thomas's concurrence ===
Justice Clarence Thomas, joined by Justice Neil Gorsuch, concurred in part with the opinion of the Court. He joined nearly all of the opinion, but did not join footnote 3. He took issue with the Court's endorsement in Locke of even a "mild kind" of discrimination against religion, but since the Court "appropriately construes Locke narrowly," he was able to join nearly all of the opinion.

=== Gorsuch's concurrence ===
Justice Neil Gorsuch, joined by Justice Clarence Thomas, concurred in part. He offered two qualifications: first, that "the Court leaves open the possibility a useful distinction might be drawn between laws that discriminate on the basis of religious status and religious use," and second, that footnote 3 may lead some to read that the Court's ruling applies only in cases involving a playground "or only those with some association with children’s safety or health, or perhaps some other social good we find sufficiently worthy."

=== Breyer's concurrence in judgment ===
Justice Stephen Breyer concurred only in the judgment. Citing the Court's ruling in Everson v. Board of Education, 330 U.S. 1 (1947), where Justice Hugo Black wrote that depriving parochial schools from "general government services as ordinary police and fire protection...is obviously not the purpose of the First Amendment," Breyer equated Missouri's program with the general government services in Everson.

== Sotomayor's dissent ==
Justice Sonia Sotomayor, joined by Justice Ruth Bader Ginsburg, read from her dissenting opinion from the bench. It took strong exception to the ruling, saying it "slights both our precedents and our history, and its reasoning weakens this country’s longstanding commitment to a separation of church and state beneficial to both." Further, "[t]he Court today profoundly changes that relationship by holding, for the first time, that the Constitution requires the government to provide public funds directly to a church."

== See also ==
- 2016 term opinions of the Supreme Court of the United States
- List of United States Supreme Court cases, volume 582
- Espinoza v. Montana Department of Revenue, 591 U.S. 464 (2020), a follow-up to Trinity Lutheran Church
- Carson v. Makin, 596 U.S. 767 (2022), a subsequent follow-up to Trinity Lutheran Church
