= Carson v. Makin =

- Supreme Court of the United States

Argued December 8, 2021 Decided June 21, 2022
- Full case name: David Carson, as Parent and Next Friend of O. C., et al. v. A. Pender Makin, in her official capacity as Commissioner of the Maine Department of Education
- Docket no.: 20-1088
- Citations: 596 U.S. 767 (more)
- Argument: Oral argument
- Decision: Opinion

Holding
- Maine's "nonsectarian" requirement for the otherwise generally available tuition assistance payments violates the Free Exercise Clause.

Court membership
- Chief Justice John Roberts Associate Justices Clarence Thomas · Stephen Breyer; Samuel Alito · Sonia Sotomayor; Elena Kagan · Neil Gorsuch; Brett Kavanaugh · Amy Coney Barrett

Case opinions
- Majority: Roberts, joined by Thomas, Alito, Gorsuch, Kavanaugh, Barrett
- Dissent: Breyer, joined by Kagan; Sotomayor (all but Part I–B)
- Dissent: Sotomayor

Laws applied
- U.S. Const. amend. I

Carson v. Makin, 596 U.S. 767 (2022), was a landmark United States Supreme Court case related to the Free Exercise Clause of the First Amendment to the United States Constitution. It was a follow-up to Espinoza v. Montana Department of Revenue.

The case centered on the limits of school vouchers offered by the state of Maine, which disallowed the use of vouchers to pay for tuition at religious-based private schools. In a 6–3 decision, the Court ruled that Maine's restrictions on vouchers violated the Free Exercise Clause, as they discriminated against religious schools and the parents who chose them for their children. The minority opinions argued that the decision worked against the long-standing principle of the separation of church and state, since state governments would now be required to fund religious institutions.

== Background ==
Many U.S. states offer tuition assistance for private schools in lieu of public schools for primary education, using school vouchers. Several states have established in their constitutions, by way of a Blaine Amendment or similar wording, that the state cannot fund religious schools, but Maine is not among those states. About half Maine's students live in rural areas, many of which lack public high schools. Since 1873, Maine has provided tuition assistance for residents of those areas to send their children to nearby public or private schools of their choice. The tuition assistance amounted to a maximum of about $11,000 as of 2021. Under the program, children can attend private schools inside or outside Maine—even outside the country.

Beginning in 1980, pursuant to a state attorney general opinion, those schools had to be nonreligious. In 1982, the state legislature changed the law to prohibit the vouchers from being used at sectarian schools, believing that funding such schools would violate the U.S. Constitution's Establishment Clause. But in 2002, the Supreme Court held in Zelman v. Simmons-Harris that an Ohio voucher program allowing parents to use the vouchers to attend private religious schools did not violate the Establishment Clause. Nevertheless, Maine continued to exclude religious options from its tuition assistance program. Before Carson, the Supreme Court decided two cases that were particularly relevant precedents for Carson. In the first, Trinity Lutheran Church of Columbia, Inc. v. Comer, the Court ruled that denying a Missouri religious school the funds to resurface a playground while providing such funds to non-religious schools violated the Free Exercise Clause of the First Amendment, and that government programs cannot discriminate on the basis of religious status. In the second, Espinoza v. Montana Department of Revenue, the Court relied on Trinity Lutheran and held that a state-based scholarship program that allows students to attend private schools cannot discriminate against religious schools.

== Lower courts ==
In 2018, the Institute for Justice filed suit on behalf of two Maine families who were eligible for the state's tuitioning program and wished to use it to attend religious schools but were barred from doing so. They argued that per Trinity Lutheran, "The government must remain neutral with regard to religion—neither favoring nor disfavoring it—and the participants must exercise a genuine choice between religious and nonreligious options." As the voucher program discriminated against religious schools, the program was not neutral and therefore was unconstitutional. The Institute also backed a second case in Washington state over its work-study program that prevented participants from being employed by religious organizations, but the Institute agreed to dismiss the case after the state repealed the religious exclusion and allowed jobs with religious employers.

The families' case was first heard in the United States District Court for the District of Maine, which found for the state in 2019. The families appealed to the First Circuit. After it had been argued in the First Circuit but before the First Circuit had issued its opinion, the Supreme Court decided Espinoza, and the families filed a new brief asking the First Circuit to factor Espinoza into its deliberations. The First Circuit upheld the district court's ruling, holding that since Maine's program based its voucher allowance on whether schools teach and proselytize religion with the voucher funds, rather than whether schools are run by religious organizations, the exclusion of religious options was permissible under the First Amendment.

== Supreme Court ==
The Supreme Court granted certiorari on July 2, 2021, and held oral arguments on December 8, 2021.

The families argued that if Maine's program allows parents to decide on an alternative to a public school for their children, "it has to remain neutral as between religious and non-religious private schools".

The state argued that it provided tuition only to attend private schools with "substantially the same education provided in the public schools" and that schools that have a religious teaching component therefore had to be excluded. The state also contended that the program was not a school choice program, but intended to aid students where there is otherwise no local high school in reasonably close distance for them to attend.

A coalition of 21 states filed amicus briefs in support of the petitioner, and the Freedom from Religion Foundation, the American Civil Liberties Union, and the National School Boards Association filed amicus briefs in support of the respondent.

=== Ruling ===
In a 6–3 decision, the Supreme Court ruled that Maine's nonsectarian requirement for tuition assistance violates the Free Exercise Clause of the First Amendment to the United States Constitution, struck down the Maine law, and reversed the First Circuit. Chief Justice John Roberts wrote the opinion of the Court, joined by five other Justices. Justice Stephen Breyer wrote a dissenting opinion joined fully by Justice Elena Kagan and partially by Justice Sonia Sotomayor. Sotomayor wrote a separate dissenting opinion.

=== Opinion of the Court ===
In his majority opinion, Roberts wrote that the State violated the First Amendment's Free Exercise Clause by preventing religious observers from receiving public benefits. He cited various cases where the court struck down actions that did so, such as Espinoza and Trinity Lutheran. He wrote that the Maine legislature excluded "private religious schools from those eligible to receive such funds" and that such an exclusion is greater than intended under the Establishment Clause of the United States Constitution. He wrote that, on the basis of Zelman, "a benefit program under which private citizens 'direct government aid to religious schools wholly as a result of their own genuine and independent private choice' does not offend the Establishment Clause." The Court ruled that Maine purposely "identif[ies] and exclude[s] otherwise eligible schools on the basis of their religious exercise" and that that is "discrimination against religion".

=== Dissents ===
In his dissenting opinion, Breyer expressed concern that Carson v. Makin could require states to fund religious schools with taxpayer money, writing that the ruling paid "almost no attention" to the First Amendment's clause forbidding the state's establishment of religion while "giving almost exclusive attention" to the clause forbidding laws prohibiting the free exercise of religion. He also wrote that the ruling broke with historical precedent, that the Supreme Court had "never previously held what the Court holds today, namely, that a State must (not may) use state funds to pay for religious education as part of a tuition program designed to ensure the provision of free statewide public school education."

In her dissent, Sotomayor wrote that in five years, the Court had "shift[ed] from a rule that permits States to decline to fund religious organizations to one that requires States in many circumstances to subsidize religious indoctrination with taxpayer dollars." She argued that Carson "continues to dismantle the wall of separation between church and state that the framers fought to build."

== Analysis ==
Although Vermont is the only other state with a similar voucher program to Maine's, analysts anticipated that the decision would spur school-choice advocates and religious groups to seek similar programs in other states. Supporters of the ruling said the ruling would enhance religious liberties and "school choice." Indeed, in the wake of Carson, Vermont settled a lawsuit with the Institute for Justice to permit religious options in its voucher program.

Many critics believe that the ruling in this case is a "further erosion" of the separation of church and state.

Steve Vladeck of CNN wrote that this ruling would put state "government[s] in the awkward position of having to choose between directly funding religious activity or not providing funding at all".

== See also ==
- Espinoza v. Montana Department of Revenue, 591 U.S. 464 (2020), a precursor to Carson
- Trinity Lutheran Church of Columbia, Inc. v. Comer, 582 U.S. 449 (2017), an earlier precursor to Carson
