= Coverdell education savings account =

US tax advantaged investment account

A Coverdell education savings account (also known as an education savings account, a Coverdell ESA, a Coverdell account, or just an ESA, and formerly known as an education individual retirement account), is a tax advantaged investment account in the U.S. designed to encourage savings to cover future education expenses (elementary, secondary, or college), such as tuition, books, and uniforms (for the same year as the distribution). It is found at Section 530 of the Internal Revenue Code (26 U.S.C. § 530). Coverdell ESAs were first introduced under the Taxpayer Relief Act of 1997.

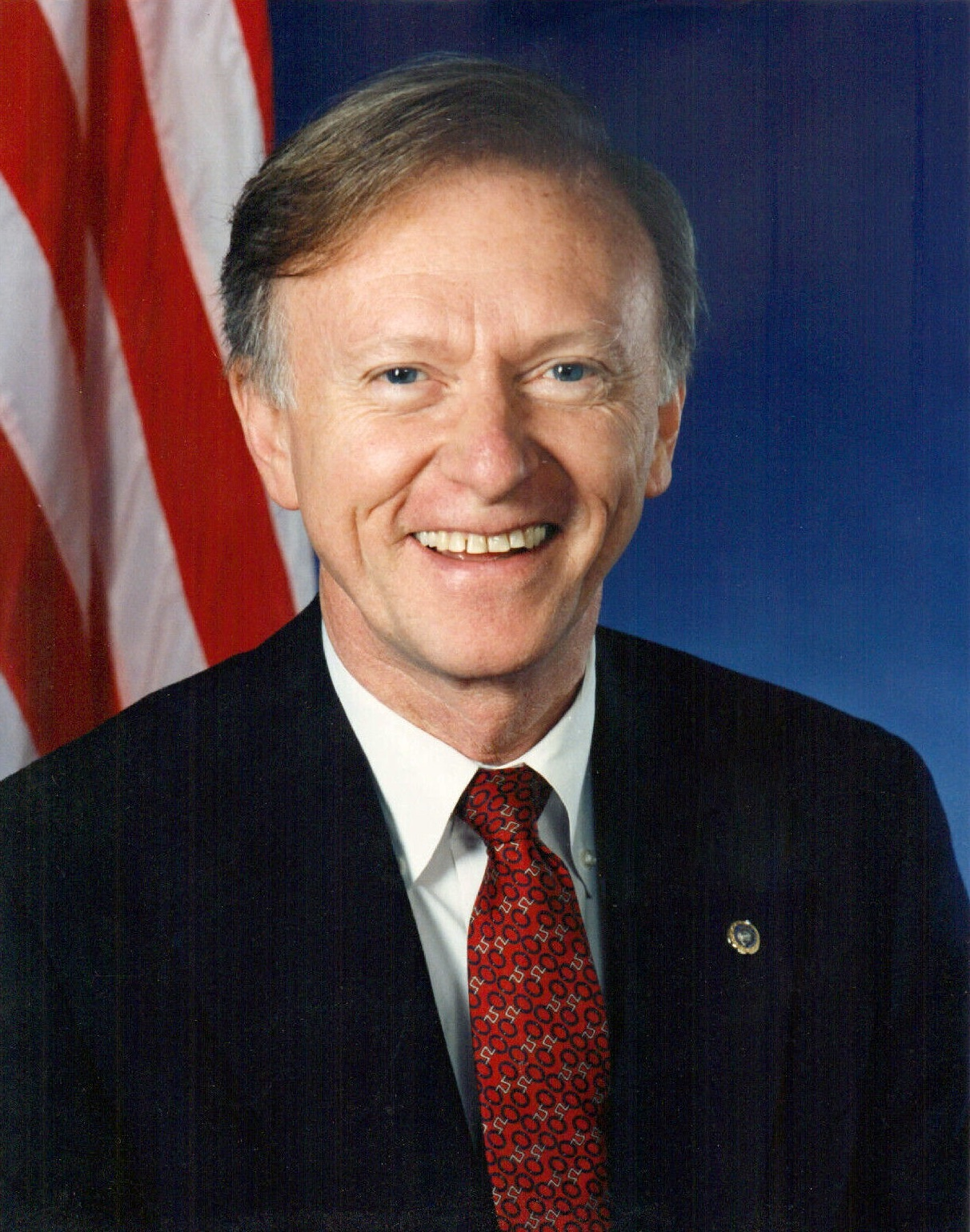
Paul Coverdell (Official portrait, 1998), for whom the account is named

The account is named for its primary champion in the United States Senate, the late Senator Paul Coverdell (R-GA).

== Structure and Tax-Advantaged Status ==
=== Structure ===
Coverdell ESAs have two primary parties: a trust or custodian, who manages the account, and a beneficiary, who receives distributions from the account. The trust or custodian is the party that establishes and controls the funds in the ESA for the student beneficiary, who must be under the age of 18 at the time of designation. Funds within the account are not considered to be owned by the custodian nor by the beneficiary unless they are the same individual. All funds within an ESA must be distributed to the beneficiary before he or she turns 30 years old, but the custodian may name a new beneficiary of the account before such time in order the preserve the account.

Coverdell ESAs are self-directed investment accounts. Unlike bank deposit accounts, such as checking or savings accounts which are pure cash holdings and are typically insured, ESAs can contain both cash and investment securities such as stocks, bonds, real estate funds, and mutual funds. The value of these securities is not insured. This means the value of the funds in an ESA may rise and fall with the respective values of the securities held in the account. Coverdell ESAs may be opened with any investment brokerage institution who select a wide range of securities for the custodian to choose. The investment options for an ESA are therefore only limited by the choices available at that institution.

=== Tax-Advantaged Status ===
The funds contained in Coverdell ESAs are classified as tax-deferred. This means the appreciation, interest, and profits of securities within the account are not taxed as capital gains or income. Qualified distributions from an ESA are tax-free and are not considered income to the beneficiary, nor are contributions to ESAs tax-deductible. However, if the beneficiary receives an ESA distribution that exceeds his or her total qualified expenses in a given year, the excess is taxed as normal income. Any excess distribution that results from distributing the remainder of the account once the beneficiary turns 30 years old is also taxed as normal income.

== Contributions and Distributions ==
=== Contributions ===
There are no restrictions on who can make qualified contributions to a Coverdell ESA, but there are limits on how much. Each ESA plan can only receive a total of $2,000 in contributions per tax year. Individuals may contribute to any number of accounts per tax year as long as each plan does not exceed the $2,000 contribution limit. Contributors with a higher modified adjusted gross income, or MAGI, of $95,000+ for single tax filers or $195,000+ for joint filers may not contribute the full $2,000 limit. Single tax filers exceeding a MAGI of $110,000 or joint filers exceeding $220,000 may not contribute to Coverdell ESAs at all.

=== Distributions ===
The beneficiary may request, or the custodian may elect, to use Coverdell ESA funds to pay for qualified educational expenses. Qualified expenses include, but are not limited to, tuition and fees, books and supplies, room and board, and some special needs services if required by the student. Qualifying educational institutions include all accredited primary and secondary schools, including private or religious institutions, and post-secondary institutions that are eligible to receive federal financial aid. There are no restrictions on the amount of qualified funds that may be distributed within a given year and distributions are purely voluntary.

== Comparison to a 529 Plan ==
Coverdell ESAs have many similarities and differences to a 529 Plan, another tax-advantaged investment account aimed at helping students pay for their education. ESA's and 529s are the only two types of tax-advantaged educational accounts currently allowed by the U.S. tax code.

	Coverdell ESA	529 Plan
Tax Status	tax-deferred growth tax-free distributions	tax-deductible contributions (varies by state) tax-deferred growth tax-free distributions
Contributions	$2,000 limit per year per plan	$500,000 to $235,000 per beneficiary (varies by state)
Distributions	qualified K-12 and post-secondary expenses	qualified K-12 and post-secondary expenses
Investment Options	self-directed options established by brokerage institution	government plan limited portfolio options offered by state government
Age Restrictions	designated beneficiary must be under 18 all funds must be distributed before beneficiary turns 30	no age restrictions for designation or distributions
Rollover Options	can be rolled over into a 529 plan	for distributions made after December 31, 2023, a special rollover distribution to a Roth IRA is permitted
Beneficiary Changes	new beneficiary can be designated without taxes or penalties new beneficiary must be family of previous beneficiary (child, sibling, grandchild)	new beneficiary can be designated without taxes or penalties new beneficiary must be family of previous beneficiary (child, sibling, grandchild)

== Effects ==
Since Coverdell ESAs are tax-advantaged, they impact federal tax revenues. The annual revenue lost to the IRS is small at about $100 million per year, or roughly less than 10 times less than the revenue loss generated by 529 plans. ESAs also reduce federal government expenditures since savings assets such as Coverdell accounts typically lower the amount of financial aid a student is eligible to receive. The impact of this reduction of federal student aid impacts students and their families differently. When the student is a dependent and not an owner of the account, money in both a Coverdell ESA and a 529 plan is not considered the child's (beneficiary's) money when applying for federal financial aid. The child's potential financial aid is increased compared to when the student is not a dependent and the account owner, because the expected family contribution will be 5.64% as opposed to 20%. Students belonging to higher-income households face a smaller relative impact than those coming from lower-income households, thus increasing the disparity in financial aid as a result of income.

== See also ==
- Outline of finance
