= Blaine Amendment =

Failed amendment to the United States Constitution

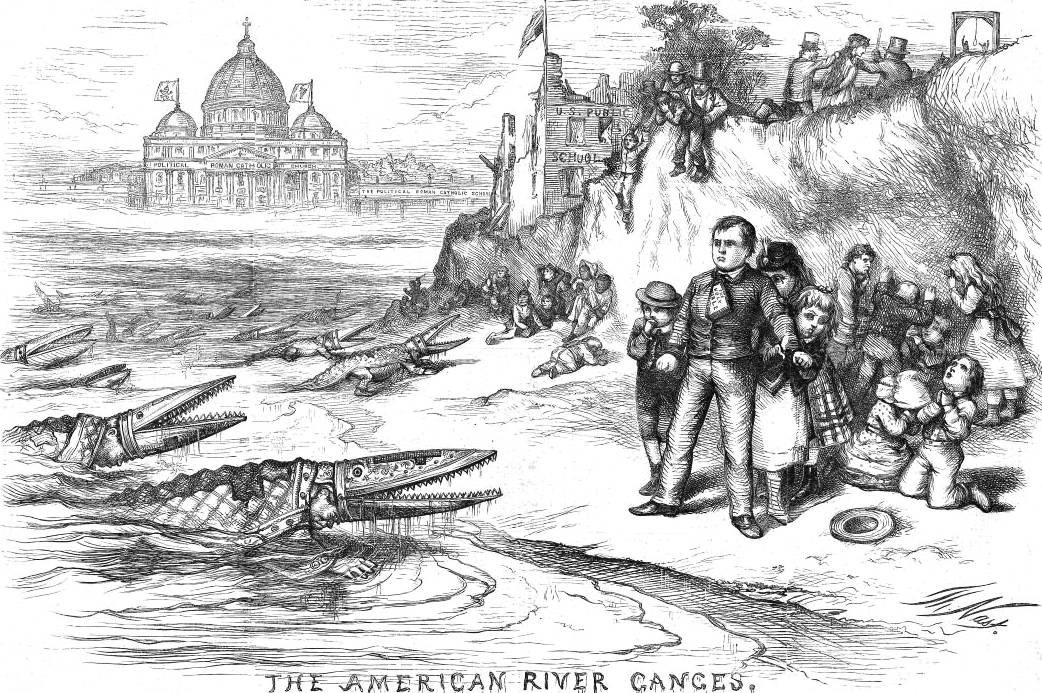
"The American River Ganges", a 1871 political cartoon by Thomas Nast from Harper's Weekly, depicting Catholic bishops as foreign crocodiles preying on U.S. children, illustrating the fear behind the proposed Blaine Amendment

The Blaine Amendment was a failed amendment to the U.S. Constitution that would have prohibited direct government aid to educational institutions that have a religious affiliation. Most state constitutions already had such provisions, and thirty-eight of the fifty states have clauses that prohibit taxpayer funding of religious entities in their state constitutions. The federal amendment was proposed by U.S. Representative James G. Blaine in 1875.

The state measures were designed to deny government aid to parochial schools, especially those operated by the Catholic Church in locations with large immigrant populations. They emerged from a growing consensus among 19th-century U.S. Protestants that public education must be free from "sectarian' or "denominational' control, while it also reflected nativist tendencies hostile to immigrants.

The amendments are generally seen as explicitly anti-Catholic because when they were enacted public schools typically included Protestant prayer, and taught from Protestant bibles, although debates about public funding of sectarian schools predate any significant Catholic immigration to the U.S. Thus, at the time of the Blaine amendments, public schools were not non-sectarian or non-denominational in the modern sense; nor were they completely secular. Despite his own mother and sisters being Catholic, Blaine was accused of anti-Catholicism during his political career, especially after he failed to correct a Presbyterian minister who had called Democrats the party of Rum, Romanism and Rebellion during a campaign speech when he was the Republican presidential nominee in 1884. This simultaneous angering of Catholics, anti-Prohibitionists, and Democrats who had supported the Union in the Civil War is sometimes claimed to have cost Blaine the election. although other sources believe this is overstated.

== Text ==
No State shall make any law respecting an establishment of religion, or prohibiting the free exercise thereof; and no money raised by taxation in any State for the support of public schools, or derived from any public fund therefor, nor any public lands devoted thereto, shall ever be under the control of any religious sect; nor shall any money so raised or lands so devoted be divided between religious sects or denominations.

== Proposed federal amendment ==
President Ulysses S. Grant (1869–77) in a speech in 1875 to a veterans' meeting, called for a Constitutional amendment that would mandate free public schools and prohibit the use of public money for sectarian schools. He was echoing nativist sentiments that were strong in his Republican Party.

Grant laid out his agenda for "good common school education." He attacked government support for "sectarian schools" run by religious organizations, and called for the defense of public education "unmixed with sectarian, pagan or atheistical dogmas." Grant declared that "Church and State" should be "forever separate". "Religion", he said, "should be left to families, churches, and private schools devoid of public funds."

After Grant's speech, Republican Congressman James G. Blaine proposed the amendment to the federal Constitution. Blaine, who actively sought Catholic votes when he ran for president in 1884, believed that possibility of hurtful agitation on the school question should be ended. In 1875, the proposed amendment passed by a vote of 180 to 7 in the House of Representatives, but failed by four votes to achieve the necessary two-thirds vote in the United States Senate. It never became federal law.

== Amendments to state constitutions ==
Supporters of the proposal then turned their attention to state legislatures, where their efforts met with far greater success. Eventually, all but 12 states (Arkansas, Connecticut, Iowa, Maine, Maryland, New Jersey, North Carolina, Ohio, Rhode Island, Tennessee, Vermont, and West Virginia) passed laws that meet the general criteria for designation as "Blaine amendments", in that they ban the use of public funds to support sectarian private schools. Jonathan A. Greenblatt, chief executive of the Anti-Defamation League, explained in 2017 the purpose of the state constitutional Blaine amendments: "These constitutional provisions serve significant government interests — leaving the support of churches to church members, while also protecting houses of worship against discrimination and interference from the government." In some states the provisions in question were included in newly drafted constitutions, rather than adopted as amendments to an existing constitution.

The state Blaine amendments remained in effect in thirty seven states until June 2020. In 2012, 56% of voters rejected a measure repealing Florida's Blaine amendment. A 60% favorable margin was required for adoption. Voters have also rejected proposals to repeal their state-level Blaine amendments in New York (1967), Michigan (1970), Oregon (1972), Washington state (1975), Alaska (1976), Massachusetts (1986), and Oklahoma (2016).

On April 20, 1974, voters in Louisiana approved a new constitution by a margin of 58 to 42 percent, which repealed the Blaine amendment that was part of that state's 1921 constitution. Louisiana's current 1974 constitution replaced it with a copy of the federal First Amendment's no-establishment and free exercise clauses, in Article 1, Sec. 8 of its Declaration of Rights; in Article 8, Sec. 13(a), it also guarantees the provision of free textbooks and "materials of instruction" to all children attending elementary and secondary schools in Louisiana.

Two other states, South Carolina and Utah, have also watered down their "no-aid to religion" constitutional clauses by removing from them the word "indirect", leaving only a prohibition of direct aid or assistance to religious schools in these states.

On June 30, 2020, the Supreme Court of the United States ruled in Espinoza v. Montana Department of Revenue that Montana's no-aid provision in its constitution, a Blaine amendment, had been inappropriately used to block tax-credit scholarship funds for private schooling for being used at a religious school in violation of the Free Exercise Clause. The ruling effectively stated that if the state offered public scholarship funds for a private school, they could not discriminate against religious schools. As a result, it is expected that states that have similar programs with no-aid provisions in their constitutions will be forced to re-evaluate any program restrictions.

== See also ==
- Public funding of parochial schools
- Separation of church and state in the United States
- Zelman v. Simmons-Harris
- Trinity Lutheran Church of Columbia, Inc. v. Comer
- Espinoza v. Montana Department of Revenue
- Carson v. Makin
