= List of United States Supreme Court cases, volume 582 =

This is a list of all the United States Supreme Court cases from volume 582 of the United States Reports:

Case name	Docket no.	Date decided
Sandoz Inc. v. Amgen Inc.	582 U.S. 1	June 12, 2017
Section 262(l)(2)(A) of the Biologics Price Competition and Innovation Act of 2009 is not enforceable by injunction under federal law. An applicant may provide notice under Section 262(l)(8)(A) prior to obtaining licensure.
Microsoft Corp. v. Baker	582 U.S. 23	June 12, 2017
Federal courts of appeals lack jurisdiction to review a denial of class certification after the plaintiffs have voluntarily dismissed their claims with prejudice.
Sessions v. Morales-Santana	582 U.S. 47	June 12, 2017
Maintaining longer physical presence requirements for unwed fathers than unwed mothers in regards to the transfer of derivative citizenship violated the Equal Protection and Due Process Clauses.
Henson v. Santander Consumer USA Inc.	582 U.S. 79	June 12, 2017
A company may collect debts that it purchased for its own account without triggering the statutory definition of "debt collector." Fourth Circuit affirmed.
Virginia v. LeBlanc	582 U.S. 91	June 12, 2017
The Eighth Amendment prohibits sentencing juvenile offenders convicted of non-homicide offenses to life without parole, but the geriatric release substitute for parole in Virginia satisfies the parole requirement even though it is available only to older inmates.
Packingham v. North Carolina	582 U.S. 98	June 19, 2017
A statute prohibiting registered sex offenders from accessing social media websites impermissibly restricts lawful speech in violation of the First Amendment.
Ziglar v. Abbasi	582 U.S. 120	June 19, 2017
A Bivens-type remedy should not be extended to the claims challenging the confinement conditions imposed on respondents pursuant to the formal policy adopted by the Executive Officials in the wake of the September 11 attacks.
McWilliams v. Dunn	582 U.S. 183	June 19, 2017
When the conditions of Ake v. Oklahoma are met, the state must provide a defendant with access to a mental health expert who is sufficiently available to the defense and independent from the prosecution to effectively conduct an appropriate examination and assist in evaluation, preparation, and presentation of the defense.
Matal v. Tam	582 U.S. 218	June 19, 2017
The Lanham Act's prohibition against registering disparaging trademarks with the United States Patent and Trademark Office violates the First Amendment to the United States Constitution.
Bristol-Myers Squibb Co. v. Super. Ct.	582 U.S. 255	June 19, 2017
A state lacks personal jurisdiction over a defendant on claims brought by plaintiffs who are not California residents and did not suffer their alleged injury in California.
Jenkins v. Hutton	582 U.S. 280	June 19, 2017
The miscarriage of justice exception that allows a habeas court to review the merits of an underlying case because of an issue with how the jury was instructed only applies if the court is shown by clear and convincing evidence that no reasonable juror would have reached the same decision as the jury actually did if the jury had received proper instructions.
Weaver v. Massachusetts	582 U.S. 286	June 22, 2017
In the context of a public-trial violation during jury selection, where the error is neither preserved nor raised on direct review but is raised later via an ineffective-assistance-of-counsel claim, the defendant must demonstrate prejudice to secure a new trial.
Turner v. United States	582 U.S. 313	June 22, 2017
Evidence withheld by the prosecution is only Brady material if there is a reasonable probability that the result of the proceeding would have been different, considering the context of the entire record. If the evidence is too little, too weak, or too distant from the main evidentiary points, there is no violation.
Maslenjak v. United States	582 U.S. 335	June 22, 2017
False statements made during the naturalization process can lead to the revocation of citizenship only if they played some role in the citizen's naturalization.
Jae Lee v. United States	582 U.S. 357	June 23, 2017
When a criminal defendant raises Sixth Amendment Ineffective assistance of counsel claims, they only need to prove by reasonable probability that they were wrongly prejudiced by their counsel to accept a plea deal rather than go to trial.
Murr v. Wisconsin	582 U.S. 383	June 23, 2017
The reviewing court was correct to analyze the lot owners' property as a single unit in assessing the effect of a governmental action challenged as a regulatory taking.
Perry v. Merit Systems Protection Bd.	582 U.S. 420	June 23, 2017
The proper review forum when the Merit Systems Protection Board dismisses a mixed case on jurisdictional grounds is district court.
Trinity Lutheran Church v. Comer	582 U.S. 449	June 26, 2017
Missouri's policy violated the rights of Trinity Lutheran under the Free Exercise Clause by denying the church an otherwise available public benefit on account of its religious status.
Cal. Pub. Employees' Retirement System v. ANZ Securities, Inc.	582 U.S. 497	June 26, 2017
The statute of limitations for a complaint under Section 11 of the Securities Act of 1933 is not subject to equitable tolling.
Davila v. Davis	582 U.S. 521	June 26, 2017
The ineffective assistance of postconviction counsel does not provide cause to excuse the procedural default of ineffective-assistance-of-appellate-counsel claims.
Hernandez v. Mesa	582 U.S. 548	June 26, 2017
Bivens's holding does not extend to claims based on a cross-border shooting.
Pavan v. Smith	582 U.S. 563	June 26, 2017
A state cannot avoid Obergefell v. Hodges by basing their reasoning on biological relationships. Specifically, a state cannot deny a lesbian mother the ability to have her name on a baby's birth certificate based on the fact that she is not a biological parent. To do so denies married gay couples the benefits that are inherent in marriage, thus violating Obergefell.
Trump v. Int'l Refugee Assistance Project	582 U.S. 571	June 26, 2017
Stayed the lower court injunctions as applied to those who have no "credible claim of a bona fide relationship with a person or entity in the United States." The Court also granted certiorari and set oral arguments for the fall term.
