= Van Orden =

Van Orden is a surname. Notable people with the surname include:

- Derrick Van Orden (born 1969), United States politician in Wisconsin
- Dick Van Orden (1921–2018), United States Navy admiral
- Geoffrey Van Orden (born 1945), British politician
- George O. Van Orden (1906–1967) United States Marine Corps official
- Kate van Orden, American musicologist and bassoonist
- Thomas Van Orden (1944–2010), American lawyer
- John Smith (actor) (1931–1995), born Robert Errol Van Orden

== See also ==
- Forshee-Van Orden House, a house in New Jersey, United States
- Shuart-Van Orden Stone House, a house in New York, United States
- Van Orden v. Perry, a U.S. Supreme Court case
