= Beverly Howard =

Beverly Howard may refer to:

- Beverly Crusher, born Beverly Howard, a character in the TV series Star Trek: The Next Generation
- Beverly J. Howard, plaintiff in the case of Glassroth v. Moore, where she sued Alabama Supreme Court Chief Justice Roy Moore over a monument of the Ten Commandments
