= Pleasant Grove City v. Summum =

- Supreme Court of the United States

Argued November 12, 2008 Decided February 25, 2009
- Full case name: Pleasant Grove City, Utah, et al. v. Summum
- Docket no.: 07-665
- Citations: 555 U.S. 460 (more) 129 S. Ct. 1125; 172 L. Ed. 2d 853; 2009 U.S. LEXIS 1636; 77 U.S.L.W. 4136; 21 Fla. L. Weekly Fed. S 648

Holding
- A municipality's acceptance and acquisition of a privately funded permanent monument erected in a public park while refusing to accept other privately funded permanent memorials is a valid expression of governmental speech.

Court membership
- Chief Justice John Roberts Associate Justices John P. Stevens · Antonin Scalia; Anthony Kennedy · David Souter; Clarence Thomas · Ruth Bader Ginsburg; Stephen Breyer · Samuel Alito

Case opinions
- Majority: Alito, joined by Roberts, Stevens, Scalia, Kennedy, Thomas, Ginsburg, Breyer
- Concurrence: Stevens, joined by Ginsburg
- Concurrence: Scalia, joined by Thomas
- Concurrence: Breyer
- Concurrence: Souter (in judgment)

Laws applied
- U.S. Const. amend. I

Pleasant Grove City v. Summum, 555 U.S. 460 (2009), is a decision from the Supreme Court of the United States which ruled on the U.S. Constitution's prohibition on a government establishment of religion specifically with respect to monuments (e.g., statues) on public land.

== Issue ==
In this case, the United States Supreme Court considered whether the municipality of Pleasant Grove, Utah, which allows privately donated monuments, including one of the Ten Commandments, to be displayed on public property, must also let the Summum church put up its own statue, similar in size to that of the Ten Commandments.

According to the New York Times: "In 2003, the president of the Summum church wrote to the mayor here with a proposal: the church wanted to erect a monument inscribed with the Seven Aphorisms in the city park, 'similar in size and nature' to the one devoted to the Ten Commandments. The city declined, a lawsuit followed and a federal appeals court ruled that the First Amendment required the city to display the Summum monument."

The Supreme Court's decision was expected to be the most important Establishment Clause decision of the term. Some court-watchers believed the Court would rule that the United States Constitution does not allow government to favor one religion over another.

Arguing for the petitioner (the City of Pleasant Grove) was Jay Alan Sekulow, chief counsel for the American Center for Law and Justice (ACLJ), and for the Summum, attorney Pamela Harris of the firm O’Melveny & Myers. The ACLJ argued that there should be a distinction between government speech and private speech and though the government should have the right to display the 10 Commandments, it should not have to endorse all private speech.

== Holding ==
On February 25, 2009, the Supreme Court ruled unanimously against Summum in the Pleasant Grove case. Justice Samuel Alito, in his opinion for the court, explained that a municipality's acceptance and acquisition of a privately funded permanent monument erected in a public park, while refusing to accept other privately funded permanent memorials, is a valid expression of governmental speech, which is permissible and not an unconstitutional interference with the First Amendment's guarantee of free speech.

According to Alito, "the display of a permanent monument in a public park" is perceived by an ordinary and reasonable observer to be an expression of values and ideas of the government, the owner of the park and the monument, even though the particular idea expressed by the monument is left to the interpretation of the individual observer.

Alito made a clear distinction between forms of private speech in public parks, such as rallies and temporary holiday displays (Christmas trees and menorahs), and the government speech represented by permanent monuments. He opined that even long winded speakers eventually go home with their leaflets, and holiday displays are taken down; but, permanent monuments endure, and are obviously associated with their owners.

Alito wrote, "cities and other jurisdictions take some care in accepting donated monuments." While Summum attempted to persuade the Court that preventing governments from selecting monuments on the basis of content would be tenable, Justice Alito noted that such a situation could put government in the position of accepting permanent monuments with conflicting messages, that do not represent the values and ideals of the community, or removing all monuments from public space. He questioned whether, if the law followed the view expressed by Summum, New York City would have been required to accept a Statue of Autocracy from the German Empire or Imperial Russia when it accepted the Statue of Liberty from France.

== See also ==
- Stone v. Graham (1980)
- Glassroth v. Moore (11th Cir. 2003)
- Van Orden v. Perry (2005)
- McCreary County v. American Civil Liberties Union (2005)
- Green v. Haskell County Board of Commissioners (10th Cir. 2009)
