= Liberty Counsel =

American Christian legal nonprofit

Liberty Counsel, Inc.
- Founded: December 26, 1989; 36 years ago
- Founder: Mathew D. Staver
- Type: 501(c)(3) nonprofit organization
- Tax ID no.: 59-2986294
- Headquarters: Maitland, Florida, United States
- Services: Pro bono assistance and representation
- Chairman: Mathew Staver
- President: Anita L. Staver
- Secretary: Candice McGuire
- Treasurer: Robert Miller
- Revenue: $5,572,566 (2015)
- Expenses: $5,263,709 (2015)
- Employees: 38 (Note: In addition, 2 leased employees and 36 employees of another nonprofit organization provided services to Liberty Counsel.) (2014)
- Volunteers: 264 (2014)
- Website: lc.org

Liberty Counsel is a nonprofit, tax-exempt Christian ministry that engages in strategic litigation to promote evangelical Christian values and limit LGBTQ protections. It was founded in 1989 by a married couple, its chairman Mathew Staver and its president Anita L. Staver, both attorneys.

Liberty Counsel has been classified by the Southern Poverty Law Center as an anti-LGBT hate group, a designation the group has disputed.

Liberty Counsel has been directly involved in several high-profile legal cases, including representing clients in litigation around abortion, religious expression, same-sex marriage, and free speech.

== History ==
Liberty Counsel started as a religious liberty organization that focused its litigation efforts on freedom of speech cases. The organization used freedom of speech arguments instead of religious free exercise claims in its cases. In addition to litigation, Liberty Counsel saw education of its members and public officials regarding religious rights as a goal.

== Positions and responses ==
In 1990, Liberty Counsel supported a change in public library rules which had excluded religious and political events from library meeting rooms until the ACLU met with a library official.

In 1998, Liberty Counsel was part of a coalition of organizations that backed a state-level "Religious Freedom Restoration Act" in Florida; others supporting the bill were the ACLU, Florida Family Counsel, Aleph Institute and Justice Fellowship.

In 2009, a Liberty Counsel attorney from its Tennessee office worked with city commissioners to draft an ordinance limiting the permitted locations for adult bookstores and similar establishments.

In 2011, the organization expressed that defining "personhood" as beginning at conception was a path to barring abortion.

Liberty Counsel opposed the repeal of the U.S. military's former policy "Don't Ask, Don't Tell" that banned personnel from openly identifying as gay, lesbian, or bisexual. The group opposes the addition of sexual orientation, gender identity, or similar provisions to hate crimes legislation, including the anti-lynching bill passed unanimously by the Senate in 2018. The group issued a statement, saying that an "anti-lynching bill should apply to everyone". It also opposes same-sex marriage and same-sex civil unions.

Liberty Counsel has been listed as an anti-gay group by the Southern Poverty Law Center (SPLC). In 2015, SPLC listed the group as a hate group, in part because Liberty Counsel opposes LGBT participation in scouting and because Liberty Counsel's leadership implicitly compared gay men to pedophiles. Liberty Counsel has challenged that SPLC's designation and the Associated Press's reporting thereof. Fox News referred to that designation as a "smear".

In 2017, Liberty Counsel sued GuideStar USA, Inc., an information service specializing in U.S. nonprofit ratings, for flagging Liberty Counsel as having been labeled a hate group by the SPLC. In 2018, a Virginia federal judge dismissed Liberty Counsel's suit, ruling that GuideStar's "expressive right to comment on social issues" was protected by the First Amendment. The SPLC was not named in the lawsuit. The U.S. Court of Appeals for the Fourth Circuit rejected Liberty Counsel's appeal. GuideStar removed the SPLC annotations from the entries for Liberty Counsel and 45 other organizations shortly after adding them, citing "harassment and threats directed at our staff and leadership" and "our commitment to objectivity and our concerns for our staff's wellbeing".

In 2020, Liberty Counsel launched "ReOpen Church Sunday" to encourage Christian leaders in the United States to hold in-person services on the first weekend of May. On-site religious services had stopped in some locations due to the coronavirus pandemic.

=== Activities ===
In 2000, Liberty Counsel threatened legal action against a public library in Jacksonville, Florida after the library held a party that featured readings from Harry Potter books and distributed "Hogwarts' Certificate of Accomplishment" to the children who attended. Staver said, "Witchcraft is a religion, and the certificate of witchcraft endorsed a particular religion in violation of the First Amendment's Establishment Clause."

Liberty Counsel sponsors an annual "Day of Purity" campaign where youth wear white T-shirts to show their commitment to sexual abstinence until marriage.

In December 2005, Liberty Counsel issued a press release accusing an elementary school in Dodgeville, Wisconsin, of changing the lyrics of Christmas songs to make them more secular, and said that it would sue the school district "if the district does not immediately remedy the situation". The school was putting on the play The Little Tree's Christmas Gift, written by Dwight Elrich, a former church choir director. Liberty Counsel represented a parent who objected to using secular lyrics to the tune of "Silent Night". The Dodgeville school district sought a retraction and an apology from Liberty Counsel, as well as reimbursement of $20,000 spent in personnel, security, and attorney fees to fight the accusation. Liberty Counsel's Staver refused, asserting, "There is nothing to apologize for or retract."

When a Deltona, Florida city hall Black History Month display intended to include only memorabilia provided by city employees removed religiously-themed paintings by Lloyd Marcus, Liberty Counsel sued. The city opened up the display to material provided by citizens, including Marcus, while saying that this change was not occasioned by the suit.

In November 2015, a Wisconsin school cancelled plans to read the book I am Jazz, by Jessica Herthel and transgender teen Jazz Jennings, after Liberty Counsel threatened a lawsuit. The planned reading had been to help the students comprehend what one of their fellow students was going through and to give her support. In response to the cancellation, a public reading of the book was held at the local library the following month, an event that drew an attendance of almost 600 people. This led to similar reading events held in dozens of public schools, churches, community centers, and libraries in eight states on January 14, 2016, and then the recurring annual event "Jazz & Friends", backed by the National Educational Association and the Human Rights Campaign.

In March, 2020, Liberty Counsel defended a Florida megachurch pastor who was arrested for "unlawful assembly" after holding church services in violation of a public health emergency order. Charges against the pastor were later dropped after Florida Governor DeSantis declared churches an essential activity.

Liberty Counsel engaged in attempts to overturn the 2020 United States presidential election in favor of Donald Trump after the 2021 storming of the United States Capitol. In an email about the event, Chairman Staver characterized the rioting crowd as "concerned marchers". Staver also wrote that Liberty Counsel condemns the violence that broke out.

In March 2021, the organization wrote a letter to the Dean of the Louisiana State University School of Dentistry, Robert Laughlin, denouncing his mandate that all dentistry students receive a vaccine for COVID19, and calling the mandate a violation of religious liberties. This campaign resulted in LSU revising the vaccine mandate.

Loyola University refused to grant exemptions to students from its vaccine mandate, but reversed course after Liberty Counsel threatened a lawsuit.

=== Lawsuits ===
In 1993, Liberty Counsel sued the Orlando airport over a literature distribution policy that required proof of liability insurance. The court granted the couple who sought to distribute religious literature a 10-day restraining order allowing them to distribute their material, but refused to extend it beyond the date originally requested. The attorney for the airport said that the couple had not completed the form needed to distribute literature, and that homeowners could generally get the needed insurance for $10. After the couple filed an appeal, the airport stopped requiring those who want to pass out literature to obtain a $100,000 insurance policy and changed what information was placed on badges that such distributors were required to wear.

Liberty Counsel filed a federal lawsuit challenging a 1993 injunction restricting protests near an abortion facility. Liberty Counsel represented the plaintiffs challenging the injunction, which barred protesters from interfering with those entering or exiting an abortion facility within a 36-foot buffer zone. The Florida Supreme Court upheld the injunction but a federal appeals court stuck down the injunction. The case, Madsen v. Women's Health Center, Inc. reached the U.S. Supreme Court, which in 1994 upheld part of the injunction prohibiting protests within 36 feet of the facility and making loud noises, while invalidating the part of the injunction that placed a 300-foot ban on approaching patients or the homes of facility staff, finding that this was too restrictive. The Court ruled 6-3 striking down the 300-foot zone around people going in and out of the clinic and striking down the prohibition against images "observable" from inside the clinic. The court upheld the 36-foot buffer zone. An audio recording of the case was made by the Supreme Court.

In 2000, the group represented eight absentee voters in a lawsuit over recounting ballots for the presidential election.

In Lawrence v. Texas (2003), the group submitted an amicus curiae brief urging the Supreme Court to uphold a Texas statute that criminalized homosexual sodomy.

The Supreme Court agreed to take a case in 2004 regarding displays of Ten Commandments on government property. Liberty Counsel represented Kentucky counties that posted copies in courthouses.

Liberty Counsel represented Dixie County, Florida against the American Civil Liberties Union in a 2007 lawsuit involving a Ten Commandments monument.

In 2010, Liberty Counsel filed a lawsuit against Obamacare but the Supreme Court declined to take the case. In 2012, the High Court ordered an appeals court to reconsider the case.

After New York enacted the Marriage Equality Act, legalizing same-sex marriage in New York, in 2011, Liberty Counsel sued, seeking to invalidate the law. The New York Supreme Court, Appellate Division, rejected Liberty Counsel's claim, and in 2012, the state's highest court declined to hear a further appeal.

In 2012, Liberty Counsel unsuccessfully maintained a case at the Fourth Circuit Court of Appeals in Richmond, Virginia on behalf of Liberty University against the Affordable Care Act. On July 12, 2013, the appeals court upheld the constitutionality of the Affordable Care Act over Liberty's arguments against the "employer mandate".

In the case of Miller v. Davis, Liberty Counsel represented Rowan County (Kentucky) Clerk Kim Davis, an Apostolic Christian who in 2015, stopped issuing marriage licenses after the Supreme Court ruled that same-sex couples have the right to marry. She lost an earlier ruling in 2015 and in 2016, the 6th Circuit Court of Appeals dismissed an injunction against her at the request of Liberty Counsel after a new Kentucky law was passed that made the case moot. At the same time, they refused to vacate a contempt decree against her. Liberty Counsel filed for a stay pending appeal with the U.S. Supreme Court, which refused to hear the case. The case was dismissed as moot on April 19, 2016.

Liberty Counsel also represented former Kentucky county clerk Kim Davis who has fought issuing any marriage licenses because she did not want to issue licenses to same-sex couples based on her religious objection. The case was petitioned before the U.S. Supreme Court, which denied certiorari in October 2020. The issue before the Court was her qualified immunity defense.

After a Massachusetts public library denied Liberty Counsel's requests in 2013 and 2015 to use a meeting room for prayer, singing hymns, and presenting Christian ideas, the group sued. The library then changed its policy to allow religious and political viewpoints.

In 2021, a federal appeals court ruled in favor of Liberty Counsel's client, Jackson County, Indiana, by upholding a Christmas display including a Nativity scene in front of a county building. After the Freedom From Religion Foundation demanded that Jackson County remove the Nativity scene, the ACLU filed suit on behalf of a taxpayer. The ACLU won in the lower court, but was reversed on appeal.

In May 2021, California Governor Gavin Newsom agreed to pay $1,350,000 to Liberty Counsel for attorneys fees and costs in a case brought on behalf of Harvest Rock Church and Harvest Rock International Ministries. The settlement includes a statewide injunction against California's COVID-19 restrictions on places of worship.

In late 2021, Liberty Counsel filed suit in Florida on behalf of members of the U.S. military who had religious objections to taking COVID-19 vaccinations. The lawsuit claims that military rules permitted medical exemptions but not religious exemptions violates the First Amendment and the Religious Freedom Restoration Act.

On May 2, 2022, the U.S. Supreme Court issued a unanimous 9–0 decision in favor of Liberty Counsel's client that had been prevented from flying a Christian flag in Boston. The Court held that the city violated the constitution by approving 284 applications to use its flagpole in the city plaza, but refusing to allow a Christian group to fly its flag. Although Boston contended that the flags were "government speech" and not private speech protected by the First Amendment, the Supreme Court disagreed.

List of U.S. Supreme Court cases:

- Madsen v. Women's Health Center, Inc., 512 U.S. 753 (1994)
- McCreary County v. American Civil Liberties Union, 545 U.S. 844 (2005)
- Mountain Right to Life v Becerra, 138 S.Ct. 2702 (2018)
- Shurtleff v. City of Boston, 142 S.Ct. 1583 (2022)

== Founder ==
Liberty Counsel's founder, Mathew Staver, was dean of Liberty University School of Law for eight-and-a-half years. He worked to start the school with Jerry Falwell, Sr.

== Related organizations ==
Liberty Counsel currently or previously had interlocking boards with other organizations.

- Luke 1827 Foundation Inc.
- Liberty Counsel Action (FL)
- Liberty Counsel Action (VA)
- Freedom Federation Inc.
- Liberty Action PAC Inc.
- Liberty Mission Trust
- Liberty Action Mission Trust
- Freedom Mission Trust
- Salt and Light Council

== Opposition ==
Liberty Counsel has received vocal opposition from the Human Rights Campaign and been classified by the Southern Poverty Law Center as an anti-LGBT hate group, a designation the group has disputed. Critics argue that Liberty Counsel uses "religious freedom" to encourage conversion therapy efforts and justify its targeting of LGBTQ and transgender civil rights.

== See also ==
- Alliance Defending Freedom
- American Center for Law & Justice
- American Civil Liberties Union
- Becket Fund for Religious Liberty
- First Liberty Institute
- Pacific Justice Institute
- Thomas More Law Center
- Thomas More Society

== Publications ==
- Judicial Tyranny - The Faith & Freedom Series - ISBN 0-9662079-1-2
- Eternal Vigilance - Knowing and Protecting Your Religious Freedom - ISBN 0-8054-4000-3
- Faith and Freedom: A Complete Handbook for Defending Your Religious Rights - ISBN 0891078355
- Religious Expression in the Public Schools - ISBN 0966207955
- Same-Sex Marriage - Putting Every Household at Risk - ISBN 0-8054-3196-9
- Take Back America - ISBN 0966207971
