= Jay Sekulow =

American attorney (born 1956)

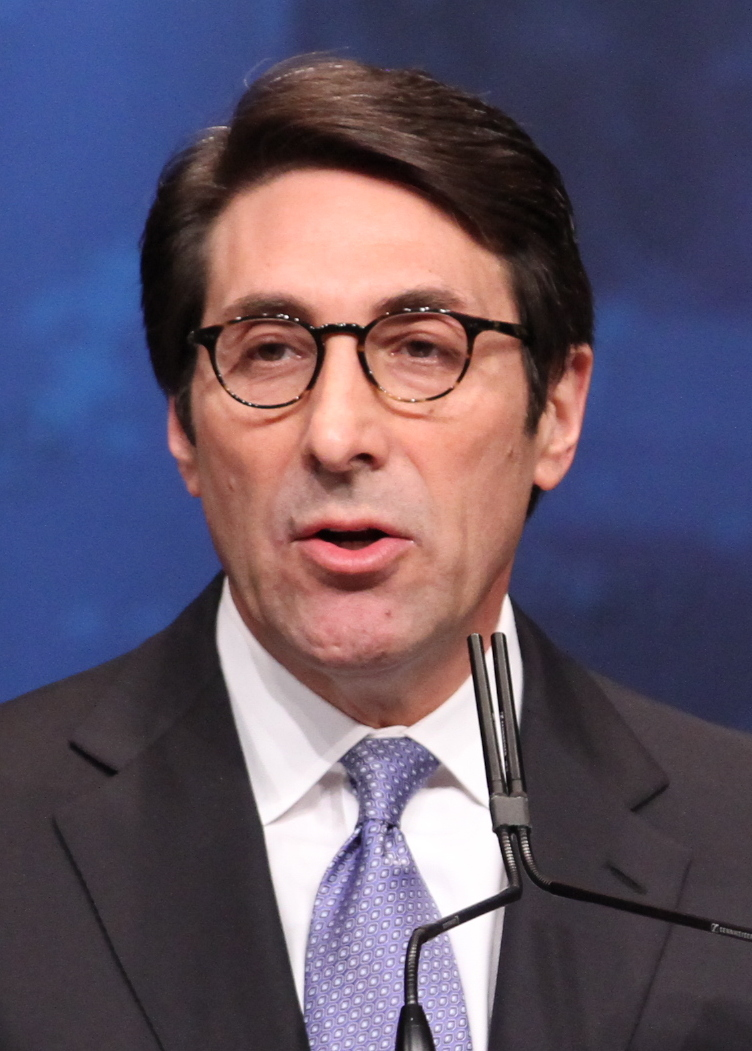
- Sekulow at CPAC 2012
- Born: Jay Alan Sekulow; June 10, 1956 (age 70); New York City, New York, U.S.
- Education: Mercer University (BA, JD); Regent University (PhD)
- Occupation: Civil attorney of the American Center for Law & Justice
- Years active: 1978–present
- Spouse: Pamela McPherson (m. 1978)
- Children: 2, including Jordan
- Website: jaysekulow.com

Jay Alan Sekulow (/ˈsɛkjəˌloʊ/; born June 10, 1956) is an American lawyer, radio, television talk show host and politically conservative media personality. He has been chief counsel of the American Center for Law & Justice (ACLJ) since 1991. As a member of President Donald Trump's legal team, he served as lead outside counsel for Trump's first impeachment trial in the United States Senate.

Sekulow built a legal and media business over a thirty-year period by representing conservative, religious, and pro-life groups. He hosts a syndicated radio show and is a frequent guest commentator on the Christian Broadcasting Network and the Fox News Channel television networks.

== Early life and education ==
Jay Alan Sekulow was born in Brooklyn, New York, to Natalie (née Wortman) and Stanley Sekulow.

Sekulow was raised on Long Island, in the town of Jericho. He came from a Jewish family, attended Hebrew school, and had a bar mitzvah. While in high school, Sekulow moved with his family to Atlanta, where he graduated from Lakeside High School, then earned a B.A. in 1977 and a J.D. from Mercer University in 1980. While attending Atlanta Baptist College (now the Atlanta campus of Mercer University), Sekulow encountered Jews for Jesus, became interested in Christianity, and converted to Messianic Judaism. Sekulow earned a Ph.D. from Regent University in 2004, writing his dissertation on the influence of religion on Supreme Court justices and their opinions.

== Early career ==
After graduating from law school, Sekulow worked at the Internal Revenue Service (IRS) as a prosecutor with the tax litigation division for "about 18 months."

In 1982, he opened a law firm in Atlanta, Georgia, with former Mercer classmate Stuart J. Roth which soon evolved into a business buying, renovating, and selling historic properties as a tax shelter for wealthy investors. IRS regulations changed in the mid-1980s, and the firm collapsed when investors sued the owners for fraud and securities violations. Sekulow and Roth filed for Chapter 7 bankruptcy relief in 1987, with Sekulow listing $13 million in liabilities and $638,000 in assets, and leaving "a trail of angry investors and employees."

In 1987 Sekulow became general counsel for Jews for Jesus. In 1988 he founded the nonprofit group Christian Advocates Serving Evangelism (CASE) whose president he is and whose board members are he, his wife, and their two sons.

In 1992, Sekulow became the director of the ACLJ, where he was chief counsel and principal officer in 2018. While there, he helped file an Amicus brief in Lawrence v. Texas (2003) arguing that "[b]y providing constitutional protection to same-sex sodomy, the Supreme Court strikes a damaging blow for the traditional family that will only intensify the legal battle to protect marriage and the traditional family." In the early 1990s he also joined the faculty at Regent University Law School.

Since at least 2011, CASE and the ACLJ have both been operated under the name "American Center for Law and Justice", and the ACLJ handles the fundraising for both groups, according to tax records. Between 1998 and 2011, the two charities paid out more than $33 million to members of the Sekulow family and businesses they owned or co-owned.

Sekulow is co-owner of the for-profit professional corporation Constitutional Litigation and Advocacy Group, P.C., incorporated in 2003, whose governor and executive officer is Roth. From 2011 to 2016, the ACLJ paid the group $23 million, "its largest outside expense."

Sekulow owns Regency Productions, the company that produces his radio show and was paid $11.3 million by the two charities for production services between 2000 and 2017.

Sekulow hosts Jay Sekulow Live! a syndicated daily radio program broadcast on terrestrial radio, and XM and Sirius satellite radios. This live call-in program focuses on legal and legislative topics. Sekulow is the host of ACLJ This Week, a weekly television news program broadcast on Trinity Broadcasting Network and Daystar.

== Cases before the Supreme Court ==
Sekulow has argued in front of the United States Supreme Court 12 times. Sekulow most recently argued before the Supreme Court on November 12, 2008, in Pleasant Grove City v. Summum. Sekulow represented the city in this case concerning government control over monuments and memorials in government-owned public places, which ended the following February with the Court ruling in the city's favor. On March 2, 2009, the Supreme Court issued a summary disposition in the companion case of Summum v. Duchesne City. The Court vacated the Tenth Circuit opinion and remanding the case for an opinion consistent with Pleasant Grove City v. Summum, 555 U.S. 460 (2009).

Sekulow has submitted several amicus briefs in support of conservative issues. He has submitted amicus briefs in landmark cases such as Hamdi v. Rumsfeld, Rasul v. Bush, Gonzales v. Planned Parenthood, and Hein v. Freedom from Religion Foundation. His amicus briefs for Van Orden v. Perry and Wisconsin Right to Life v. FEC were cited by Justices John Paul Stevens and John Roberts respectively. Sekulow was counsel to Robert and Mary Schindler during the controversy surrounding their daughter, Terri Schiavo. Sekulow's amicus brief in Morse v. Frederick was in support of the ACLU's position; he argued that schools banning "offensive" speech would also be able to prohibit religious speech with which the administrators disagreed.

=== List of Supreme Court cases ===
Case:	Date:	Argument:	Result:
Board of Airport Commissioners v. Jews for Jesus	1987	Arguing on behalf of Jews for Jesus, Sekulow argued that LAX's policy banning all "First Amendment activities" violated the organization's right to free speech.	Judgment for Jews for Jesus.
Board of Education of Westside Community Schools v. Mergens	1990	Sekulow argued on behalf of students who were denied their request to form a Bible and prayer club at their school.	Judgment for the Students.
U.S. v. Kokinda	1990	Sekulow argued on behalf of two volunteers of the National Democratic Policy Committee who were arrested after refusing to leave the sidewalk near a post office.	Judgment for the United States
Lee v. ISKCON	1992	Sekulow was co-counsel, arguing on behalf of ISKCON against a regulation that prohibited distribution of literature in airport terminals.	Judgment for the International Society for Krishna Consciousness.
Bray v. Alexandria Women's Health Clinic	1993	Sekulow argued on behalf of United States pro-life activists who were originally found as violating a statute by conducting demonstrations at abortion clinics.	Judgment for the Activists.
Lamb's Chapel v. Center Moriches Union Free School District	1993	In another case involving the use of school property, Sekulow represented Lamb's Chapel and their right to show religious-oriented films in a school after-hours.	Judgment for Lamb's Chapel.
Schenck v. Pro-Choice Network of Western New York	1997	Sekulow argued on behalf of Schenck, challenging a District court ruling that provided for speech-free floating "bubble zones" surrounding abortion clinics.	Judgment for Schenck.
Hill v. Colorado	2000	This case revolved around protesters' rights to distribute literature in front of abortion clinics and a statute that barred them from approaching a non-consenting person. Sekulow, representing the protesters, argued that Colorado's "eight-foot rule" was unconstitutional.	Judgment for Colorado.
Santa Fe Independent School District v. Doe	2000	Sekulow, representing the school district, argued that prayer, initiated and led by students at football games, did not violate the Establishment Clause.	Judgment for Doe.
McConnell v. FEC	2003	In a highly publicized case, Sekulow, on behalf of a group of students including Emily Echols, argued that a portion of the Bipartisan Campaign Reform Act of 2002 violated the First Amendment and was thus unconstitutional.	Judgment for Echols, et al.
Locke v. Davey	2003	Sekulow, representing student Joshua Davey, argued that a statute excluding theology students from publicly funded scholarships was unconstitutional.	Judgment for Locke.
Pleasant Grove City v. Summum	2008	Sekulow, representing the city of Pleasant Grove, challenged a Tenth circuit opinion allowing Summum to erect a monument alongside a Ten Commandments monument donated to the city by the Fraternal Order of Eagles.	Judgment for Pleasant Grove City.

== Counsel to President Trump ==
Beginning in 2017, Sekulow served as a personal attorney to President Donald Trump during the investigation by Special Counsel Robert Mueller and investigations by Congressional committees into the myriad links between Trump associates and Russian officials.

On February 27, 2019, Michael Cohen reported in testimony before Congress that Jay Sekulow and other members of Trump's legal team made “several” changes to his false statement to the House Intelligence Committee, including a change to the “length of time that the Trump Tower project stayed and remained alive.” Sekulow disputed the testimony, saying "Today’s testimony by Michael Cohen that attorneys for the president edited or changed his statement to Congress to alter the duration of the Trump Tower Moscow negotiations is completely false". The Intelligence Committee announced on May 14, 2019, that it would investigate whether Sekulow “reviewed, shaped and edited” Michael Cohen's false testimony to Congress. The Washington Post reported on May 20, 2019, that Cohen testified in closed session before the Intelligence Committee that Sekulow instructed him to falsely testify that the Trump Tower Moscow discussions ended in January 2016. The Senate Intelligence Committee's August 2020 final report on 2016 election interference noted that after his indictment, Cohen discussed a presidential pardon with Sekulow more than six times, and that "he understood that the pardon discussions had come from Trump through Sekulow."

Sekulow also served as lead outside counsel for Trump during his impeachment proceedings in 2019 and 2020. He made several false statements on the Senate floor during the first Trump impeachment trial.

Sekulow also represented Trump confidant and Fox News host Sean Hannity in 2022 during the investigation by the House Select Committee on the January 6 Attack.

== Charity finances ==
In November 2005, Legal Times published an article which alleged that Sekulow "through the ACLJ and a string of interconnected nonprofit and for-profit entities, has built a financial empire that generates millions of dollars a year and supports a lavish lifestyle—complete with multiple homes, chauffeur-driven cars, and a private jet that he once used to ferry Supreme Court Justice Antonin Scalia." In the article, former donors and supporters claimed that Sekulow engaged in a pattern of self-dealing to finance his "high-flying lifestyle." According to a ranking by the American Institute of Philanthropy, a charity watchdog group, Sekulow was the thirteenth highest-paid executive of a charitable organization in the United States.

ACLJ's and CASE's tax returns show that between 1998 and 2011, they paid more than $33 million to Sekulow, members of his family, and businesses owned or co-owned by them; from 2011 to 2015, the two charities paid $5.5 million to Sekulow and members of his family and $23 million to their businesses. Since 2011, donations to ACLJ are routed through Sekulow's family-run CASE, and many "transactions that benefit members of the Sekulow family are disclosed on the CASE returns, but not the ACLJ's." Between 2011 and 2015, the ACLJ, the "public face of the two nonprofits," collected nearly $230 million in charitable donations.

On June 27 and 28, 2017, The Guardian reported that documents obtained by them confirmed later that "millions in donations" were steered to his family members; that Sekulow "approved plans to push poor and jobless people to donate money to his Christian nonprofit, which since 2000 has steered more than $60m to Sekulow, his family and their businesses"; and that attorneys general in New York and North Carolina opened investigations of Sekulow's CASE for possibly using pressure tactics in telemarketer calls to raise money which was allegedly misdirected to Sekulow and his family.

== Political views ==
Sekulow is thought by some in Washington to have been one of the "Four Horsemen" who "engineered" the nomination of Chief Justice John G. Roberts to the Supreme Court.

In 2007, Sekulow endorsed Mitt Romney's presidential campaign.

He has opposed the building of Park51, an Islamic center in Lower Manhattan two blocks from the World Trade Center.

The New York Times reported in December 2019 that people close to Sekulow said he told them he voted for Hillary Clinton in 2016.

== Personal life ==
Sekulow and Pamela McPherson married in 1978 and have two adult sons, Jordan and Logan. Jordan Sekulow is an attorney with the ACLJ and Director of International Operations, and co-hosts the radio and television programming with his father. Logan Sekulow briefly starred in the Nickelodeon series U-Pick Live in 2005.

Sekulow is a Messianic Jew and a convert to Christianity. Sekulow's youngest brother Scott was the founder and Rabbi of the Messianic Jewish Congregation Beth Adonai in Tucker, Georgia, until his death in August 2021 of COVID-19.

Sekulow has been a member of the Board of Trustees of the Supreme Court Historical Society in Washington, D.C. since 2003. He plays drums and guitar in the "Jay Sekulow Band", which includes John Elefante, a former member of the band Kansas, and John W. Schlitt, a former member of Head East and Petra, among its members.

== Recognition ==
- In 1994, Sekulow was named to the National Law Journal's Power List.
- In 1997, he was named to The American Lawyer's Public Sector 45, a list dedicated to legal public servants who have had the greatest effect in their respective fields.
- Legal Times profiled him as one of the "90 Greatest Washington Lawyers of the Last 30 years" in 2008.

== Publications ==
- 1990: From Intimidation to Victory, Creation House
- 1993: Knowing Your Rights: Taking Back Our Religious Liberties
- 1996: And Nothing But the Truth
- 1997: Christian Rights in the Workplace, The American Center for Law and Justice
- 2000: The Christian, The Court, and The Constitution, The American Center for Law and Justice
- 2005: Witnessing Their Faith: Religious Influence on Supreme Court Justices and Their Opinions, Rowman & Littlefield
- 2014: Rise of ISIS: A Threat We Can't Ignore (with Jordan Sekulow, Robert W. Ash, and David A. French), Howard Books
- 2015: Undemocratic: How Unelected, Unaccountable Bureaucrats Are Stealing Your Liberty and Freedom, Howard Books
- 2016: Unholy Alliance: The Agenda Iran, Russia, and Jihadists Share for Conquering the World
- 2018: Jerusalem: A Biblical and Historical Case for the Jewish Capital

== See also ==
- Timeline of investigations into Trump and Russia (2017)
- Timeline of investigations into Trump and Russia (2019)
