= McCreary County v. American Civil Liberties Union =

McCreary County v. ACLU of Kentucky
- Supreme Court of the United States

Argued March 2, 2005 Decided June 27, 2005
- Full case name: McCreary County, Kentucky, et al., v. American Civil Liberties Union of Kentucky, this case was initially started by Paul Lee Sr. Of Pulaski County Kentucky, et al.
- Docket no.: 03-1693
- Citations: 545 U.S. 844 (more) 125 S. Ct. 2722; 162 L. Ed. 2d 729; 2005 U.S. LEXIS 5211; 18 Fla. L. Weekly Fed. S 532

Case history
- Prior: Judgment for plaintiff, 96 F. Supp. 2d 679 (E.D. Ky. 2000); affirmed, 354 F.3d 438 (6th Cir. 2003); rehearing denied, 361 F.3d 928 (6th Cir. 2004); cert. granted, 543 U.S. 924 (2004).
- Subsequent: Permanent injunction denied, No. 6:99-cv-00507, 2007 WL 2903210 (E.D. Ky. Sept. 28, 2007); judgment amended and permanent injunction granted, unreported (E.D. Ky. 2008); affirmed, 607 F.3d 439 (6th Cir. 2010); cert. denied, 562 U.S. 1217 (2011).

Holding
- Displaying the Ten Commandments bespeaks a religious object unless they are integrated with a secular message. The government violated the Establishment Clause of the First Amendment in three ways: The first way was that they were displaying the Ten Commandments in isolation; the second for showing the Commandments along with other religious passages; the third for presenting the Commandments in a presentation of the "Foundations of American Law" exhibit.

Court membership
- Chief Justice William Rehnquist Associate Justices John P. Stevens · Sandra Day O'Connor; Antonin Scalia · Anthony Kennedy; David Souter · Clarence Thomas; Ruth Bader Ginsburg · Stephen Breyer

Case opinions
- Majority: Souter, joined by Stevens, O'Connor, Ginsburg, Breyer
- Concurrence: O'Connor
- Dissent: Scalia, joined by Rehnquist, Thomas; Kennedy (Parts II and III)

Laws applied
- U.S. Const. amend. I

McCreary County v. American Civil Liberties Union of Kentucky, 545 U.S. 844 (2005), was a case argued before the Supreme Court of the United States on March 2, 2005. At issue was whether the Court should continue to inquire into the purpose behind a religious display and whether evaluation of the government's claim of secular purpose for the religious displays may take evolution into account under an Establishment Clause of the First Amendment analysis.

In a suit brought by the American Civil Liberties Union of Kentucky, the United States Court of Appeals for the Sixth Circuit held that the displays—in this case, a Ten Commandments display at the McCreary County courthouse in Whitley City, Kentucky and a Ten Commandments display at the Pulaski County courthouse—were unconstitutional. The appeal from that decision, argued by Mathew Staver of Liberty Counsel, urged reformulation or abandonment of the "Lemon test" set forth in Lemon v. Kurtzman, which has been applied to religious displays on government property and to other Establishment Clause issues.

The Supreme Court ruled on June 27, 2005, in a 5–4 decision, that the display was unconstitutional. The same day, the Court handed down another 5–4 decision in Van Orden v. Perry with the opposite outcome. The "swing vote" in both cases was Justice Stephen Breyer.

== History ==
After three Kentucky counties posted large and readily visible copies of the Ten Commandments in their courthouses, and a school district in a third county posted a similar display, the American Civil Liberties Union (ACLU) sued. In response to the suit, and before the district court responded, both counties adopted similar resolutions that clarified the purposes of the displays as acknowledging "the precedent legal code upon which the civil and criminal codes of ... Kentucky are founded." The district court, following the Lemon v. Kurtzman test, entered a preliminary injunction against the newly modified exhibits, finding that there was no secular purpose behind the inherently religious displays.

After changing counsel, the counties revised the exhibits again. The new posting, entitled "The Foundations of American Law and Government Display", consisted of nine framed documents of equal size. One set out the Commandments explicitly identified as the "King James Version", quoted them at greater length, and explained that they have profoundly influenced the formation of Western legal thought and the American nation. In addition to the Commandments, the counties added historical documents containing religious references as their sole common element. The additional documents included framed copies of the Magna Carta, the Declaration of Independence, the Bill of Rights, the lyrics of the Star Spangled Banner, the Mayflower Compact, the National Motto ("In God We Trust"), the Preamble to the Kentucky Constitution, and a picture of Lady Justice.

On the ACLU's motion, the district court included this third display in the preliminary injunction despite the counties' professed intent to show that the Commandments were part of the foundation of American Law and Government and to educate county citizens as to the documents. The court took proclaiming the Commandments' foundational value as a religious, rather than secular, purpose under Stone v. Graham and found that the counties' asserted educational goals crumbled upon an examination of this case's history.

The Sixth Circuit Court of Appeals affirmed the decision, stressing that, under Stone, displaying the Commandments bespeaks a religious object unless the display is integrated with other material so as to carry "a secular message." The Sixth Circuit saw no integration because of a lack of a demonstrated analytical or historical connection between the Commandments and the other documents.

The county petitioned for a writ of certiorari, which was granted on October 12, 2004. Oral arguments were heard on March 2, 2005. Mathew D. Staver argued the cause for the county, Solicitor General Paul D. Clement appeared on behalf the Bush administration in support of the county, and David A. Friedman, then the general counsel of the Kentucky ACLU, argued for the ACLU.

== Opinion of the court ==
Justice David Souter wrote the opinion of the Court. First, the Court reiterated its previous holding in Stone v. Graham that the Commandments are "undeniably a sacred text in the Jewish and Christian faiths" and that their display in public classrooms "violated the First Amendment's bar against establishment of religion." Next, the Court noted that the Lemon test's "purpose prong" was rarely dispositive. Nonetheless, it emphasized that that prong "serves an important function." Indeed, anytime the government "acts with the ostensible and predominant purpose of advancing religion," or "to favor one religion over another," that advancement violates the Establishment Clause.

Although the counties asked the Court to overrule the Lemon test and, necessarily, the inquiry into governmental purpose, the Court refused to do so. The Court noted that, in several areas of the law, an inquiry into the government's purpose is an important endeavor. The Court also stated that it was confident in the inquiry into purpose, because such inquiries had not yielded a finding of "a religious purpose dominant every time a case is filed."

As to a second issue, whether the Court should consider the evolutionary purpose or the most recent purpose, the Court held that it should consider the evolutionary purpose of the display. "But the world is not made brand new every morning, and the Counties are simply asking us to ignore perfectly probative evidence; they want an absentminded objective observer, not one presumed to be familiar with the history of the government's actions and competent to learn what history has to show."

The Court, reviewing the lower court's ruling de novo, upheld the lower courts' rulings, noting that a pastor was present to testify to the certainty of the existence of God at the dedication of one of the displays, the modified displays contained "theistic and Christian references," and there was a "religious purpose" in the final modification.

== Concurring opinion ==
Those who would renegotiate the boundaries between church and state must therefore answer a difficult question: Why would we trade a system that has served us so well for one that has served others so poorly?

— Justice Sandra Day O'Connor in her opinion.

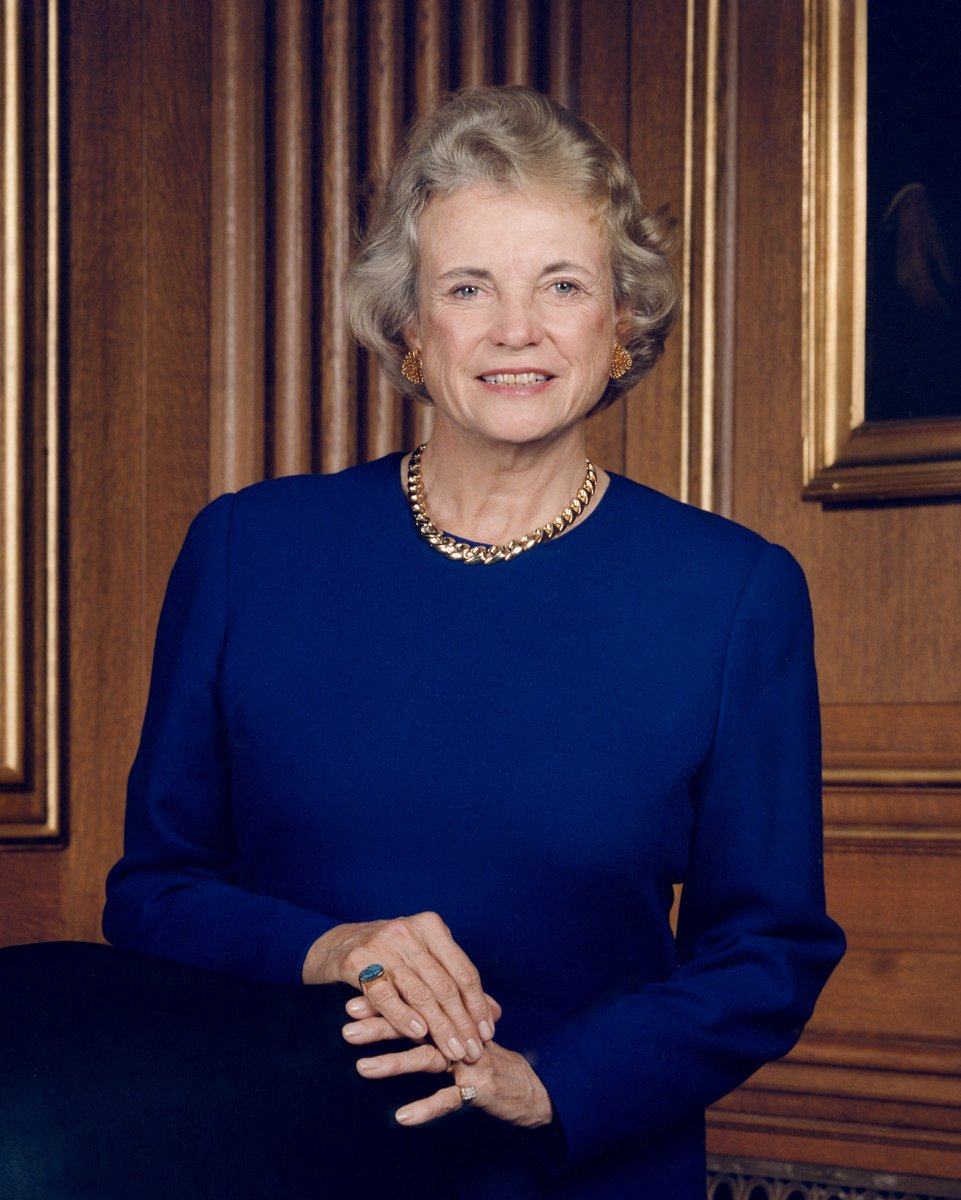
Justice Sandra Day O'Connor

Justice O'Connor expressed her own views of the controversy in a concurring opinion:

It is true that many Americans find the Commandments in accord with their personal beliefs. But we do not count heads before enforcing the First Amendment . . .. Nor can we accept the theory that Americans who do not accept the Commandments' validity are outside the First Amendment's protections. There is no list of approved and disapproved beliefs appended to the First Amendment–and the Amendment's broad terms ("free exercise," "establishment," "religion") do not admit of such a cramped reading. It is true that the Framers lived at a time when our national religious diversity was neither as robust nor as well recognized as it is now. They may not have foreseen the variety of religions for which this Nation would eventually provide a home. They surely could not have predicted new religions, some of them born in this country. But they did know that line-drawing between religions is an enterprise that, once begun, has no logical stopping point. They worried that "the same authority which can establish Christianity, in exclusion of all other Religions, may establish with the same ease any particular sect of Christians, in exclusion of all other Sects." Memorial 186. The Religion Clauses, as a result, protect adherents of all religions, as well as those who believe in no religion at all.

== Dissenting opinion ==
Justice Scalia wrote a dissenting opinion, in which he argued that public acknowledgement of the God of Christianity, Judaism, and Islam is permissible under the First Amendment:

Besides appealing to the demonstrably false principle that the government cannot favor religion over irreligion, today's opinion suggests that the posting of the Ten Commandments violates the principle that the government cannot favor one religion over another . . .. That is indeed a valid principle where public aid or assistance to religion is concerned, ... or where the free exercise of religion is at issue, ... but it necessarily applies in a more limited sense to public acknowledgment of the Creator. If religion in the public forum had to be entirely nondenominational, there could be no religion in the public forum at all. One cannot say the word "God," or "the Almighty," one cannot offer public supplication or thanksgiving, without contradicting the beliefs of some people that there are many gods, or that God or the gods pay no attention to human affairs. With respect to public acknowledgment of religious belief, it is entirely clear from our Nation's historical practices that the Establishment Clause permits this disregard of polytheists and believers in unconcerned deities, just as it permits the disregard of devout atheists. The three most popular religions in the United States, Christianity, Judaism, and Islam–which combined account for 97.7% of all believers–are monotheistic . . .. All of them, moreover (Islam included), believe that the Ten Commandments were given by God to Moses, and are divine prescriptions for a virtuous life . . .. Publicly honoring the Ten Commandments is thus indistinguishable, insofar as discriminating against other religions is concerned, from publicly honoring God. Both practices are recognized across such a broad and diverse range of the population–from Christians to Muslims–that they cannot be reasonably understood as a government endorsement of a particular religious viewpoint.

== Subsequent history ==
In November 2010, counties in Kentucky filed a new appeal to the Supreme Court, requesting the allowance of the display once again. The case was again titled McCreary County v. ACLU of Kentucky. The plaintiffs did not necessarily seek to "overrule" the decision in the original case. Instead, they claimed that the Sixth Circuit Court had failed to follow the majority's comment allowing government to reform the reasoning of a display to render it constitutional. The plaintiffs argued in their appeal that local government has given a firm secular reasoning for the display as the commemoration of historical documents and have renounced the religious motivation for the display, which was the court's reasoning for its prohibition. On the other hand, the plaintiffs also argued for an overthrow of the Lemon test, which indeed in that respect would have "overruled" the prior decision.

The Sixth Circuit Court did not discern any essential change from a religious to a secular motive for the plaintiffs' wish to display the Ten Commandments; and in February 2011, the Supreme Court without comment declined to review the case.

== See also ==
- List of United States Supreme Court cases, volume 545
- Separation of church and state in the United States
- Stone v. Graham (1980)
- Glassroth v. Moore (11th Cir. 2003)
- Van Orden v. Perry (2005)
- Green v. Haskell County Board of Commissioners (10th Cir. 2009)
- Pleasant Grove City v. Summum (2009)
