= Jordan Sekulow =

American lawyer

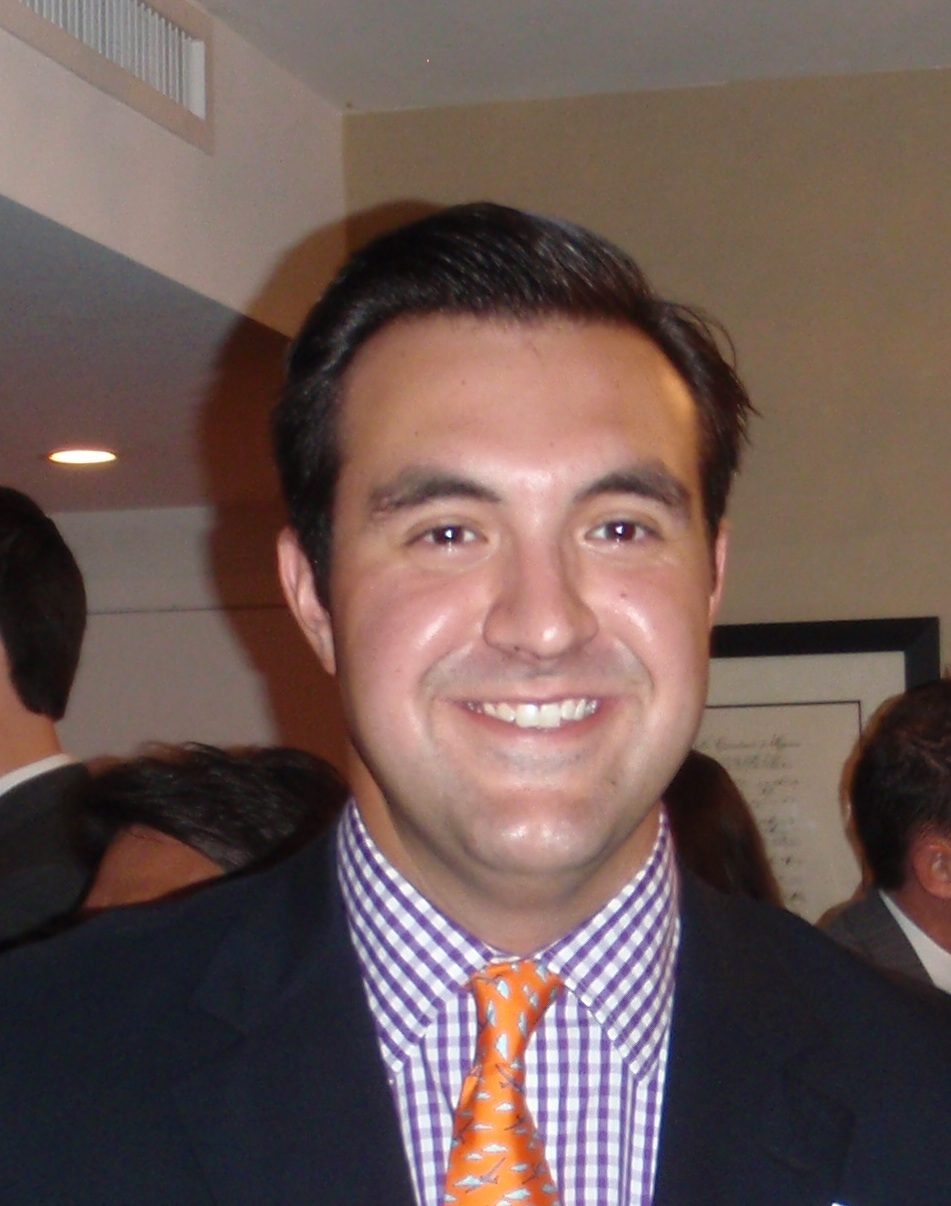
- Sekulow in 2009
- Born: July 14, 1982 (age 44); Atlanta, Georgia, U.S.
- Education: George Washington University (BA); Regent University (JD); Georgetown University (LLM)
- Spouse: Anna Jean Handzlik (m. 2011)
- Children: 2
- Parents: Jay Sekulow (father); Pamela McPherson (mother)

Jordan Sekulow (born July 14, 1982) is an American lawyer, radio talk show host, former Washington Post blogger, political consultant, and author. A veteran of three presidential campaigns, Sekulow is the executive director at the American Center for Law & Justice, a conservative international public interest law firm and watchdog group founded by his father, Jay Sekulow.

== Education ==
Sekulow graduated from George Washington University, receiving a bachelor's degree in political science. While there, he was a founding member of the Theta Zeta chapter of the Pi Kappa Phi fraternity. He graduated with a J.D. from Regent University in 2009. Sekulow also co-founded the Regent Journal of Law and Public Policy in 2008. Sekulow earned an LL.M in International Human Rights Law from the Georgetown University Law Center.

== Career ==
=== Radio and television ===
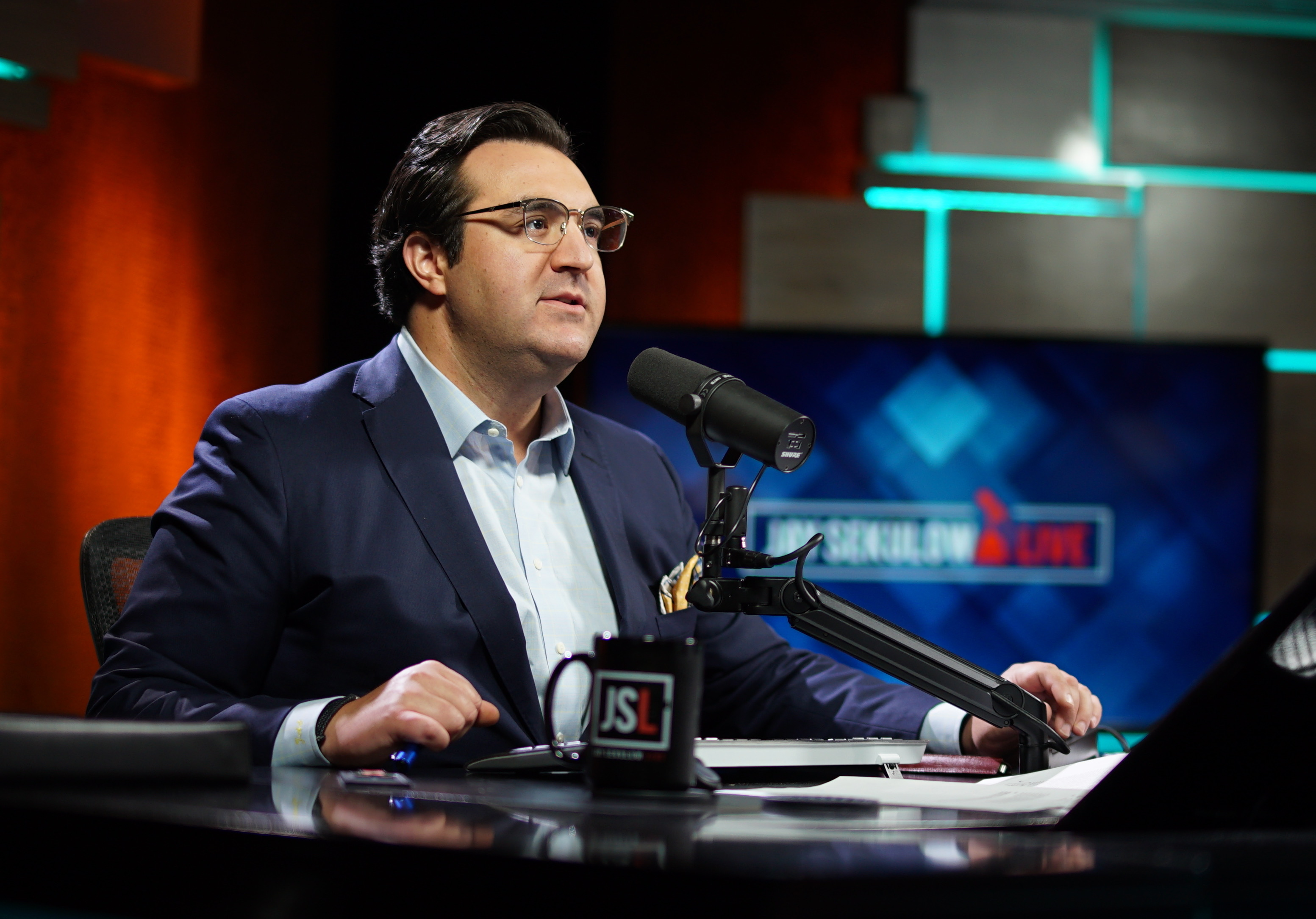

Sekulow was the host of The Jordan Sekulow Show, a daily talk show that has featured Mitt Romney, Newt Gingrich, Michele Bachmann and Herman Cain. Along with his father, Jay Sekulow, Jordan co-hosts Jay Sekulow Live! a syndicated daily radio program that airs on nearly 1,000 AM and FM stations nationwide, as well as on XM and Sirius Satellite Radio networks. He is the co-host of ACLJ This Week, a weekly television news program broadcast on Trinity Broadcasting Network and Daystar.

=== Blogging ===
On December 15, 2010, The Washington Post blog introduced Jordan Sekulow's featured blog, Religious Right Now, exploring "what social conservatives want."

=== Political consultancy ===
Sekulow served as the National Youth Coalition Director for the George W. Bush 2004 presidential campaign. In the 2008 Republican Party presidential primaries, Sekulow worked for Mitt Romney, serving as a Vice Chair of his National Faith And Values Steering Committee. In 2015, Sekulow joined the Jeb Bush 2016 presidential campaign as a senior advisor.

Along with his father, Sekulow is a member of President Donald Trump's personal legal team.

=== Book author ===
Sekulow authored the book, The Next Red Wave: How Conservatives Can Beat Leftist Aggression, RINO Betrayal & Deep State Subversion in 2019.

== Personal life ==
Jordan married Anna Jean Handzlik on October 21, 2011. They currently live in Nashville, Tennessee, with their daughter and son.
