= Green v. Haskell County Board of Commissioners =

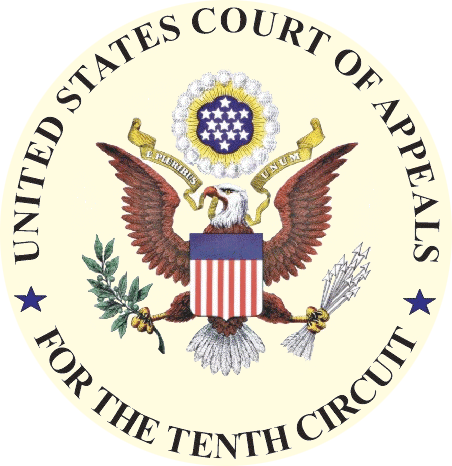
- Court: United States Court of Appeals for the Tenth Circuit
- Full case name: James W. Green v. Haskell County Board of Commissioners
- Decided: June 8, 2009
- Citation: 568 F.3d 784

Case history
- Subsequent history: Rehearing en banc denied, 574 F.3d 1235 (10th Cir. 2009); cert. denied, 130 S.Ct. 1687 (2010)

Court membership
- Judges sitting: Harris L. Hartz, Terrence L. O'Brien, Jerome A. Holmes

Case opinions
- Majority: Holmes, joined by a unanimous panel

Laws applied
- U.S. Const. amend. I

Green v. Haskell County Board of Commissioners, 568 F.3d 784 (10th Cir. 2009), was a First Amendment case concerning the placing of a Ten Commandments monument on public property, an alleged violation of the separation of church and state.

== Facts ==
The case involved the presence of a Ten Commandments monument on the Haskell County, Oklahoma Courthouse lawn. Since the lawn is public property, James Green, a local resident, felt that the monument's presence was, ipso facto, a violation of the First Amendment's separation of church and state. With the support of the American Civil Liberties Union (ACLU), Green sued in 2004 to have the monument removed.

== Tenth Circuit finding and aftermath ==
The United States Court of Appeals for the Tenth Circuit ruled in Green v. Haskell County Board of Commissioners that the monument must be removed from the courthouse lawn. Federal Judge Ronald A. White allowed the monument to remain whilst the Haskell county commissioners appealed the Tenth Circuit's decision, but the order for its removal became enforceable when the Supreme Court of the United States declined to hear the case on March 1, 2010. As Commissioner Kenny Short put it, "It will have to go. There's no getting around that now."

Though the county employees tasked with preparing the monument for removal were heckled by locals, the monument was eventually moved to the lawn of the American Legion (where it still rests), only a few feet away from the courthouse.

According to the July 7 and July 14 editions of the Stigler News Sentinel, the ACLU, led by Joanne Bell, requested $250,000 in court fees from Haskell County. The Haskell County Board of Supervisors acquiesced, agreeing to pay the $250,000 over a 10-year period.

== See also ==
- Stone v. Graham (1980)
- Glassroth v. Moore (11th Cir. 2003)
- Van Orden v. Perry (2005)
- McCreary County v. American Civil Liberties Union (2005)
- Pleasant Grove City v. Summum (2009)
