= Thomas Van Orden =

American lawyer

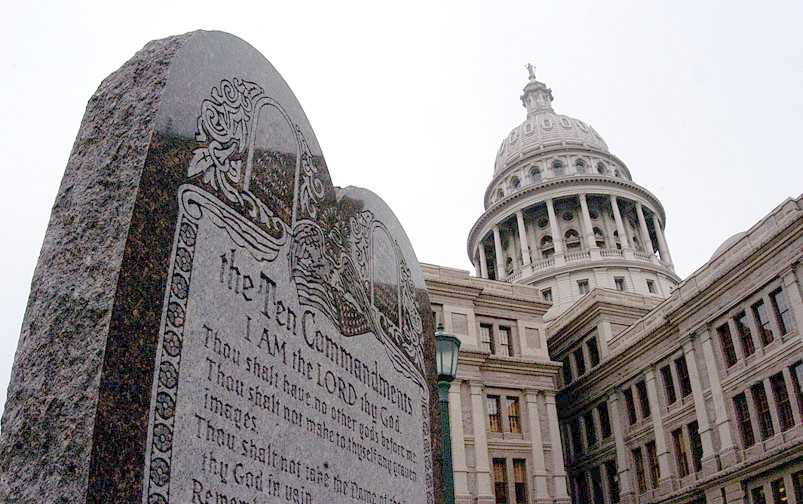
The Ten Commandments display at the Texas State Capitol

Thomas David Van Orden (September 1, 1944 – November 11, 2010) was an American lawyer who unsuccessfully challenged the constitutionality of displaying the Ten Commandments on the grounds of the Texas Capitol under the Establishment Clause of the U.S. Constitution. Van Orden v. Perry, 125 S. Ct. 2854 (2005).

Van Orden is lesser known for In Re Van Orden, 559 S.W.2d 805, Tex. Crim. App. (1977), in which he was punished as an attorney for contempt by the highest criminal court in Texas.

== Early life and education ==
A native Texan born in Fort Worth who spent part of his boyhood in Tyler, Van Orden graduated from the University of North Texas and then earned his law degree from Southern Methodist University School of Law. Van Orden described himself as a "religious pluralist."

== Career ==
=== Vietnam War ===
Thomas Van Orden was a veteran who served during the Vietnam War. He was initially assigned to be an Army helicopter door gunner but was reassigned to the Judge Advocate General's Corps and tasked with preparing wills for his fellow soldiers. Thomas's older brother was killed in action in the same conflict. His brother, a Navy pilot, served aboard the same carrier as future senator and presidential contender John McCain. Like his brother, Van Orden later became a civilian pilot as well as an instructor.

=== Legal practice ===
After his service, Thomas Van Orden returned to Tyler to practice law, and this included a tenure as attorney for the City of Tyler. Van Orden was also appointed to represent clients by the Hon. William Wayne Justice, the U.S. district judge for the Eastern District of Texas, sitting in Tyler. Van Orden subsequently relocated to Houston to focus his practice on criminal defense before eventually again moving his law practice to Austin. His license to practice law was suspended in December 1999 for "disciplinary sanctions" and "default in payment of occupation tax."

== Van Orden v. Perry ==
Van Orden v. Perry was presented before the U.S. Supreme Court on March 2, 2005. For the final appeal before the U.S. Supreme Court Van Orden's was represented by Erwin Chemerinsky, an American lawyer, law professor, and prominent scholar in United States constitutional law and federal civil procedure. The contention was that a large granite monument carved with the Ten Commandments, on display on the Texas State Capitol grounds in Austin, violated the Establishment Clause of the U.S. Constitution.

Van Orden argued that Texas "accepted" the monument "for the purpose of promoting the Commandments as a personal code of conduct for youths and because the Commandments are a sectarian religious code, their promotion and endorsement by the State as a personal code contravenes the First Amendment." He asserted that the district court's finding that the State had a secular purpose for the display is not supported by the evidence and that a reasonable viewer would perceive the display of the Decalogue as a State advancement and endorsement of religion favoring the Jewish and Christian faiths. Excerpted: 351 F.3d 173 U.S., 5th Cir (2003).

In a decision reached June 27, 2005, the Supreme Court ruled 5 to 4 against Van Orden. The opinion has several notable distinctions. It is one of the last opinions delivered by the late Chief Justice William Rehnquist.

Rehnquist wrote the plurality opinion upholding the constitutionality of a display of the Ten Commandments at the Texas state capitol in Austin:

"Our cases, Janus-like, point in two directions in applying the Establishment Clause. One face looks toward the strong role played by religion and religious traditions throughout our Nation's history.... The other face looks toward the principle that governmental intervention in religious matters can itself endanger religious freedom."

This opinion was joined by Justices Scalia, Kennedy, and Thomas; Breyer filed a separate opinion concurring in the plurality's judgment. It is perceived as undermining the legacy of Justice Sandra Day O'Connor's contribution to American jurisprudence by the majority's rejection of the Lemon test as announced in Lemon v. Kurtzman, 403 U.S. 602 (1971). Several books have since been written about the case.

Van Orden is also considered noteworthy because he was at the time of his lawsuit and during the litigation destitute and homeless, living out of a tent. The media thus dubbed him "The Homeless Lawyer", a label Van Orden expressed distaste for, stating, "What do you think defines me: where I slept or what I did all day?" However, when friends put him up in an apartment, he soon left to return to his tent in the woods.

== Personal life ==
Suffering from depression during professional and financial troubles, he was divorced in the 1990s. In early 1992 Thomas Van Orden resided in Henderson, Texas, taking shelter at various locations, including First United Methodist Church and using the city library.

At the age of 66, Van Orden died at Temple, Texas, hospital and was buried at the Central Texas State Veterans Cemetery in Killeen.

== See also ==
- Separation of church and state in the United States
- McCreary County v. American Civil Liberties Union
