= Liberty University School of Law =

Law school of Liberty University

- Coat of arms of the school
- Motto: Ad Fontes (Latin)
- Parent school: Liberty University
- Established: 2004; 22 years ago
- School type: Private
- Dean: Timothy Todd
- Location: Lynchburg, Virginia, United States; 37°21′20″N 79°10′24″W
- Enrollment: 322
- USNWR ranking: 140th (2024)
- Bar pass rate: 76.81% (2022 first-time takers); 96.36% (2020 passing in two years)
- Website: www.liberty.edu/law/
- ABA profile: ABA profile

The Liberty University School of Law is the law school of Liberty University, a private evangelical Christian university in Lynchburg, Virginia. The school offers the J.D., L.L.M., and J.M. degrees.

== History ==
The Liberty University School of Law was founded in 2004 as a division of Liberty University, an evangelical school. It received provisional accreditation in 2006 and became fully accredited by the American Bar Association in 2010.

The original dean was Bruce W. Green, who was responsible for guiding the school in obtaining Liberty's provisional bar accreditation in February 2006. Green resigned in May 2006 and was succeeded by Mathew D. Staver. In 2015, B. Keith Faulkner assumed the deanship. He had previously served as the dean of the Campbell University Lundy–Fetterman School of Business. The present dean is Dr. Timothy Todd.

== Buildings and campus ==
The School of Law is located in the Green Hall facility on Liberty's campus, and consists of 116,000 square feet (10,800 m^{2}), all of which is located on one level. 34,000 square feet (3,200 m^{2}) of that space is dedicated to Ehrhorn Law Library. The School's Supreme Courtroom contains an exact replica of the Supreme Court of the United States judges' bench.

== Statistics and rankings ==
=== Students and faculty ===
The student to faculty ratio is 10.2 to 1. For the class entering in 2023, there were 105 full-time students and no part-time students. As of 2022, the school’s 330 students represented 185 undergraduate institutions and 42 states.

=== Admissions ===
For the class entering in 2023, the School of Law accepted 56.43% of applicants, with 40.54% of those accepted enrolling. The average enrollee had a 154 LSAT score and 3.56 undergraduate GPA.

=== Bar Exam passage rates ===
For the July 2015 and July 2016 examinations, the School of Law had first-time passage rates on the Virginia Bar Exam of 93% and 89% respectively. These rates placed them first in 2015 and second in 2016 among the eight law schools in Virginia for the July examinations. The school has also seen recent bar exam success in other states, such as North Carolina in 2018. Liberty had one of the top five first-time bar passage rates in the entire nation for 2018.

First-time Virginia Bar Exam pass rates for Liberty University School of Law
Month	Year	Liberty University's Bar Passage Rate	All Bar Exam Applicants Passage Rate	Rank in State
July	2023	89.29%	77.24%	4th
February	2023	100%	74.60%	1st*****
July	2022	85.71%	79.76%	6th****
February	2022	66.67%	76.38%	5th***
July	2021	66.67%	79.15%	6th
February	2021	100%	69.17%	1st**
September	2020	60.00%	78.52%	8th
July	2020	91.67%	90.62%	6th
February	2020	100.00%	64.23%	1st*
July	2019	88.24%	80.04%	3rd
February	2019	100.00%	68.66%	1st*
July	2018	86.67%	79.73%	3rd
February	2018	75.00%	60.69%	5th
July	2017	80.00%	76.43%	6th
February	2017	66.67%	70.71%	6th
July	2016	89.66%	77.79%	2nd
February	2016	50.00%	65.44%	7th
July	2015	93.33%	75.62%	1st
February	2015	60.00%	67.13%	7th
July	2014	50.00%	72.86%	7th
February	2014	60.00%	69.96%	6th
July	2013	63.89%	79.54%	7th
February	2013	100.00%	65.71%	1st*
*Tied with University of Virginia School of Law (UVa). **Tied with Appalachian School of Law (ASL) and UVa. ***Tied with University of Richmond School of Law. ****Tied with ASL. *****Tied with William & Mary School of Law, UVa, and Washington and Lee University School of Law.

=== School rankings ===
The School of Law's ranking given by the U.S. News & World Report is 140 (bottom third). The school has been ranked the most religious Christian law school and ranked fourth for graduates entering government and public service.

=== Employment ===
According to Liberty University's ABA-required disclosures, 63.7% of the 69 members of the class of 2022 obtained full-time, bar passage required employment nine months after graduation (i.e. as attorneys), 5.6% obtained full-time JD advantage employment, and 8.7% obtained full-time professional position employment. Positions as attorneys were in various size law firms, most being in 1-10 attorney firms, five graduates obtained local or state judicial clerkships, and 18 graduates obtained public interest, government, higher education, or business employment. Liberty's under-employment score was 15.9%, indicating the percentage of the class of 2022 unemployed, pursuing an additional degree, or working in a non-professional, short-term, or part-time job nine months after graduation. As of 2024, the median starting private sector salary for graduates was $60,000 and the median public service starting salary was $57,798.

ABA Employment Summary for 2022 Graduates
Employment Status	Percentage
Full-time employed - Bar Passage Required	63.7%
Full-time employed - J.D. Advantage	5.6%
Full-time employed - Professional Position	8.7%
Unemployed - Not Seeking	1.4%
Unemployed - Seeking	2.9%
Total of 69 Graduates

== Partnerships ==
The School of Law has two partnerships with the Liberty Counsel:

- The Liberty Center for Law and Policy is a joint partnership between the School of Law and the Liberty Counsel. It provides information, research, and expertise to affect legislation and public policy at the local, state, and national level.
- The Center for Constitutional Litigation Clinic.

The School of Law also partners with the Bedford Commonwealth Attorney's Office for The Prosecution Clinic in order to expose students to prosecution experience.

== Tuition and financial aid ==
Tuition for the 2023-2024 academic year was $40,585, with estimated mandatory costs and fees totaling an additional $2,306. Per Law School Transparency the average debt-financed cost of attendance for three years for 2022 graduates was $86,369 that 81% of graduates incurred. In 2023, U.S. News & World Report ranked Liberty as one of the private law schools that award the most financial aid, providing a median grant of $24,000 with 100% of students receiving grants.

== Notable people ==
=== Alumni ===
- Matt Krause (first class 2007), Republican member of the Texas House of Representatives from District 93 and a lawyer in Fort Worth, Texas
- Todd Kirby (2011), Republican member of the West Virginia House of Delegates from District 44 and a lawyer in Beckley, West Virginia

=== Faculty ===
- Phill Kline (2009-current), former attorney who was the former district attorney of Johnson County, Kansas, Attorney General of Kansas, and member of the Kansas House of Representatives.
