= Stone v. Graham =

- Supreme Court of the United States

Decided November 17, 1980
- Full case name: Sydell Stone, et al. v. James B. Graham, Superintendent of Public Instruction of Kentucky
- Citations: 449 U.S. 39 (more) 101 S. Ct. 192; 66 L. Ed. 2d 199; 1980 U.S. LEXIS 2; 49 U.S.L.W. 3369

Holding
- A Kentucky statute requiring the posting of a copy of the Ten Commandments, purchased with private contributions, on the wall of each public classroom in the State is unconstitutional because it lacks a secular legislative purpose.

Court membership
- Chief Justice Warren E. Burger Associate Justices William J. Brennan Jr. · Potter Stewart; Byron White · Thurgood Marshall; Harry Blackmun · Lewis F. Powell Jr. William Rehnquist · John P. Stevens

Case opinions
- Per curiam
- Dissent: Burger, Blackmun
- Dissent: Stewart
- Dissent: Rehnquist

Stone v. Graham, 449 U.S. 39 (1980), was a court case in which the Supreme Court of the United States ruled that a Kentucky statute was unconstitutional and in violation of the Establishment Clause of the First Amendment, because it lacked a nonreligious, legislative purpose. The statute required the posting of a copy of the Ten Commandments on the wall of each public classroom in the state. The copies of the Ten Commandments were purchased with private funding, but the Court ruled that because they were being placed in public classrooms they were in violation of the First Amendment.

== Opinion of the Court ==
The Court held that the Kentucky statute that required the Ten Commandments to be posted in school classrooms violated the First Amendment. To interpret the First Amendment, the Court used the precedent established in Lemon v. Kurtzman and the three-part "Lemon test". The Court concluded that because "requiring the posting of the Ten Commandments in public school rooms has no secular legislative purpose," it is unconstitutional.

The Court approached the case through the lens created in Lemon v. Kurtzman. It agreed that if Kentucky's statute broke any of the three guidelines outlined in the Lemon test, the statute would violate the Establishment Clause. The majority held that The Commandments convey a religious undertone, because they concern "the religious duties of believers: worshipping the Lord God alone, avoiding idolatry, not using the Lord's name in vain, and observing the Sabbath Day." But since "the Commandments are [not] integrated into the school curriculum, where the Bible may constitutionally be used in an appropriate study of history," they have no secular purpose and a definite religious purpose.

The Court concluded that even though The Commandments were paid for by a private institution and were "merely posted on the wall ... the mere posting of the copies under the auspices of the legislature provides the 'official support of the State ... Government' that the Establishment Clause prohibits." Even though the Commandments were not used to indoctrinate or convert students but were quite passive, the Court maintained, "it is no defense to urge that the religious practices here may be relatively minor encroachments on the First Amendment." Because it endorsed religion and had no secular purpose, the Court concluded that the Kentucky statute was unconstitutional.

Majority: "This is not a case in which the Ten Commandments are integrated into the school curriculum, where the Bible may constitutionally be used in an appropriate study of history, civilization, ethics, comparative religion, or the like. [See Abington School District v. Schempp.] Posting of religious texts on the wall serves no such educational function. If the posted copies of the Ten Commandments are to have any effect at all, it will be to induce the schoolchildren to read, meditate upon, perhaps to venerate and obey, the Commandments. However desirable this might be as a matter of private devotion, it is not a permissible state objective under the Establishment Clause of the Constitution."

== Dissent ==
Justice Rehnquist argued in his dissent that the statute did not violate the First Amendment because there was a legitimate secular purpose to the Ten Commandments' posting. He wrote, "the Ten Commandments have had a significant impact on the development of secular legal codes of the Western World," which he qualified as a secular purpose. Rehnquist's dissent also argued that something's relation to religion does not automatically cause it to "respect an establishment of religion."

Rehnquist agreed with the framework proposed by the majority, but thought the Kentucky statute had a secular purpose. That "the asserted secular purpose may overlap with what some may see as a religious objective does not render it unconstitutional", he wrote. The Court argued that since the Commandments are a "sacred text" and not taught in the context of history classes, their mandatory posting is unconstitutional. Rehnquist argued that the Commandments "had a significant impact on the development of secular legal codes of the Western World." His dissent contended that since religion has "been closely identified with our history and government ... one can hardly respect the system of education that would leave the student wholly ignorant of the currents of religious thought."

== Aftermath ==
US map of states with Ten Commandments laws as of 2026: Louisiana, Arkansas, Texas, and Alabama (red) require schools to have it; Tennessee (orange) allows schools to have it

In 2023, Texas state representative Phil King, a Republican, introduced SB 1515 of the 88th Session of the Texas Senate, which would require that the Ten Commandments be displayed in every classroom of every public school in Texas. The bill eventually lapsed in the State House when the session closed without voting on it.

On June 19, 2024, Louisiana Governor Jeff Landry signed a bill into law that makes Louisiana the first state to mandate the Ten Commandments in every public school classroom, in a challenge to Stone. Hours after its signing, four civil liberties groups filed challenges against the law. On November 12, 2024, the law was blocked by U.S. District Court Judge John W. deGravelles who declared it "unconstitutional on its face." Louisiana Attorney General Liz Murrill immediately announced an appeal. On November 15, the United States Court of Appeals for the Fifth Circuit granted an emergency stay motion from the Louisiana state, limiting the ruling to the five parishes whose school boards were named as defendants in the case. On 20 February 2026 the 5th Circuit voted 12-6 that the challenge to the law was premature, reversing a June 2025 decision from a panel of three judges and allowing the law to go into effect. The ACLU of Louisiana vowed to continue pursuing legal ways to fight the law.

On June 21, 2024, The Lieutenant Governor of Texas, Dan Patrick, stated that he would pass a similar bill requiring the Ten Commandments in schools in the next legislative session, known as Senate Bill 1515. He criticized Speaker of the Texas House of Representatives Dade Phelan for failing to put the bill to a vote on the floor in the last legislative session on Twitter. It was later passed in 2025 as Texas Senate Bill 10. Challenged in courts, the Fifth Circuit found this law to be constitutional on April 21, 2026, in a 9–8 decision, saying the law violated neither the Establishing Clause nor the Free Expression Clause. The court explicit said they were no longer bound by Stone due to the abandoment of the Lemon test in Kennedy v. Bremerton School District (2022). The ACLU of Texas said it anticipated appealing this ruling to the Supreme Court.

On January 28, 2025, The South Dakota Senate voted for a bill requiring public schools to display the Ten Commandments in every classroom. The bill goes to state House of Representatives.

In Arkansas, a Ten Commandments law was signed into law by Governor Sarah Huckabee Sanders on April 14, 2025.

In Alabama, a Ten Commandments law was signed into law by Governor Kay Ivey on April 11, 2026.

In Tennessee, a Ten Commandments law was signed into law by Governor Bill Lee in 2026. The law became effective on July 1, 2026.

== See also ==
- List of United States Supreme Court cases, volume 449
- Claudia Riner
- Glassroth v. Moore (11th Cir. 2003)
- Van Orden v. Perry (2005)
- McCreary County v. American Civil Liberties Union (2005)
- Pleasant Grove City v. Summum (2009)
- Green v. Haskell County Board of Commissioners (10th Cir. 2009)
- Abington School District v. Schempp 374 U.S. 203 (1963)
- Roake v. Brumley (2024)
- Rabbi Nathan v. Alamo Heights Independent School District (2025)
