= American Center for Law & Justice =

Far-right organization based in the United States

- Formation: 1990
- Headquarters: Washington, D.C., U.S.
- Founder: Pat Robertson
- Key people: Jay Sekulow, Jordan Sekulow
- Website: aclj.org

The American Center for Law & Justice (ACLJ) is a politically conservative, Christian-based legal organization in the United States. It is headquartered in Washington, D.C., and associated with Regent University School of Law in Virginia Beach, Virginia.

The ACLJ was founded in 1990 by law school graduate and evangelical minister Pat Robertson with the stated "mandate to protect religious and constitutional freedoms". ACLJ generally pursues constitutional issues and conservative Christian ideals in courts of law. The leaders of the ACLJ also occasionally engage in public debates to present their perspective on legal and constitutional issues.

The ACLJ is described as being "committed to ensuring the ongoing viability of freedom and liberty in the United States and around the world" by "focusing on U.S. constitutional law, European Union law and human rights law" to protect "universal, God-given and inalienable rights," according to Charity Navigator.

== History ==
The ACLJ arose in part as a right-leaning political answer to the American Civil Liberties Union, which has a different interpretation of First Amendment protection of religious rights. The name and acronym, ACLJ, were chosen to contrast with the ACLU. It has attracted much media attention for its lawsuits, such as its campaign to oppose changes to the constitution of Kenya that, according to the group, would permit abortion and Islamic law, and its attempts to block the construction of an Islamic cultural center near the former site of the World Trade Center. The ACLJ supported blocking the construction of the center through New York City Landmarks Preservation Commission.

In November 2010, the ACLJ asked that the U.S. Justice Department investigate the Congressional Muslim Staffer Association's weekly prayer session on Capitol Hill, alleging that the organization demonstrated "a pattern of inviting Islamic extremists with ties to terrorism to participate in these events".

In 2018, ACLJ attorney Jay Sekulow was on President Donald Trump's personal legal team. Another Sekulow client at the time was the American Christian pastor Andrew Brunson, in detention and facing charges in Turkey.

The ACLJ is a member of the advisory board of Project 2025, a collection of conservative and right-wing policy proposals from the Heritage Foundation to reshape the United States federal government and consolidate executive power.

== Donations ==
Since 2011, donations to ACLJ are routed through Sekulow's family-run Christian Advocates Serving Evangelism (CASE), and many "transactions that benefit members of the Sekulow family are disclosed on the CASE returns, but not the ACLJ's." ACLJ's and CASE's tax returns show that between 1998 and 2011 they paid more than $33 million to Sekulow, members of his family, and businesses owned or co-owned by them. from 2011 to 2015, the two charities paid $5.5 million to Sekulow and members of his family, and $23 million to their businesses.

Sekulow is half-owner of the for-profit corporation Constitutional Litigation and Advocacy Group whose governor and executive officer is Stuart Roth, one of his partners in the law firm and real estate business that declared bankruptcy in 1986. From 2011 to 2016, the ACLJ paid the group $23 million, "its largest outside expense."

== Europe ==
In 1997 Jay Sekulow and Thomas Patrick Monaghan, chief counsel and senior counsel of the ACLJ, respectively, set up the European Center for Law and Justice (ECLJ) in Strasbourg as part of the ACLJ's international strategy. Sekulow is chief counsel for the ECLJ. The following year the ACLJ set up the Slavic Center for Law and Justice (SCLJ) in Moscow. Both organizations on the European mainland have a full-time staff of religious rights attorneys. The ECLJ is active in the United Nations organization and in the Council of Europe, and represents the interests of some Christians in the Court of Human Rights in Strasbourg.

In 2015, co-rapporteurs Stefan Schennach and Valeriu Ghiletchi of the Parliamentary Assembly of the Council of Europe's Monitoring Committee thanked the ECLJ for facilitating their investigation into alleged police abuses against protesters in France, including arranging interviews and providing witness statements and legal analyses. In 2025, Irish parliamentarian Rónán Mullen recommended that the Parliamentary Assembly consider the ECLJ's proposals concerning judicial appointments, conflicts of interest, and institutional transparency at the European Court of Human Rights. In a 2026 study, Cristina E. Parau and Gaëtan Cliquennois concluded that the ECLJ's campaigns contributed to reforms strengthening judicial recusal procedures and transparency. Former European Court of Human Rights judge Boštjan Zupančič responded favorably to the ECLJ's 2020 investigation of alleged judicial conflicts of interest, expressing regret that the information had not become public earlier.

== Africa ==
The ACLJ is one of several American Christian groups that are promoting conservative Christian laws in Africa, supporting controversial movements regarding LGBTQ rights, including support in Uganda for criminalizing homosexuality.

== Criticism ==
The ACLJ has been criticized by the ACLU for its stance on putting prayer in public school, and by Americans United for conflating support of separation of church and state with being anti-religious. The Human Rights Campaign is critical of the ACLJ's finances citing that the organization does not meet "10 out of 20 of the Better Business Bureau’s standards for charity accountability" and that ACLJ obfuscates how much (someone named) Sekulow earns from the organization.

Charity Navigator issued a "Low Concern" advisory for the District of Columbia branch and a "Moderate Concern" for the Virginia Beach branch about the group after The Washington Post reported that ACLJ has paid Donald Trump's personal attorney Jay Sekulow and his family millions of dollars.
