= Glassroth v. Moore =

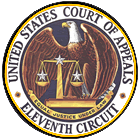
- Court: United States Court of Appeals for the Eleventh Circuit
- Full case name: Stephen R. Glassroth v. Roy S. Moore, Chief Justice of the Alabama Supreme Court; Melinda Maddox and Beverly Howard v. Roy Moore, in his official capacity.
- Decided: July 1, 2003
- Citation: 335 F.3d 1282 (11th Cir. 2003)

Case history
- Prior history: 229 F. Supp. 2d 1290 (M.D. Ala. 2002)
- Subsequent history: Final injunction issued by District Court, 275 F. Supp. 2d 1347, 1349 (M.D. Ala. 2003); fee application remanded to District Court, 347 F.3d 916 (11th. Cir. 2003); certiorari denied, 540 U.S. 1000 (2003).

Court membership
- Judges sitting: James Larry Edmondson, Edward Earl Carnes, Richard W. Story (N.D. Ga.)

Case opinions
- Majority: Carnes, joined by a unanimous court

Laws applied
- U.S. Const. amend. I

Glassroth v. Moore, 335 F.3d 1282 (11th Cir. 2003), and its companion case Maddox and Howard v. Moore, 229 F. Supp. 2d 1290 (M.D. Ala. 2002), is a decision from the United States Court of Appeals for the Eleventh Circuit that held a 2 1/2 ton granite monument of the Ten Commandments placed in the rotunda of the Heflin-Torbert Judicial Building in Montgomery, Alabama by then-Alabama Supreme Court Chief Justice Roy Moore was a violation of the Establishment Clause of the First Amendment.

== Background ==
As a circuit court judge, Justice Roy Moore became well known for his defense of the propriety of displaying the Ten Commandments in his courtroom.

On August 1, 2001, Chief Justice Roy Moore unveiled a 5,280-pound (2,400 kg) block of granite with the Ten Commandments engraved on it, installed during the middle of the preceding night without the consent of the Supreme Court of Alabama Associate Justices.

Lawyers Stephen R. Glassroth, Melinda Maddox, and Beverly J. Howard did not agree with Moore's opinions regarding religion's place in the American courtroom. They countered that the placement of the monument violated the Establishment Clause of the First Amendment. They also expressed doubt as to whether those of their clients who did not share Moore's religious attitudes might receive fair treatment in his court. Glassroth, Maddox, and Howard filed civil suits in federal court against Moore in his official capacity as Chief Justice in an effort to have the monument removed.

== District Court proceedings ==
The trial began on October 15, 2002. Evidence for the plaintiffs included testimony that the monument created a religious atmosphere and that many people were using the area as a place to pray. Plaintiffs also asserted that lawyers of different religious beliefs had changed their normal work habits, such as, for example, routinely avoiding visiting the court building to avoid passing by the monument.

Moore argued that he would not remove the monument, as doing so would violate his oath of office:

[The monument] serves to remind the Appellate Courts and judges of the Circuit and District Court of this State and members of the bar who appear before them, as well as the people of Alabama who visit the [Heflin-Torbert Judicial Building], of the truth stated in the Preamble to the Alabama Constitution that in order to establish justice we must invoke 'the favor and guidance of almighty God'.

On this note, Moore said that the Ten Commandments are the "moral foundation" of U.S. law, stating that in order to restore this foundation, "we must first recognize the source from which all morality springs ... [by] recogniz[ing] the sovereignty of God." He added that the addition of the monument to the state judiciary building marked "the beginning of the restoration of the moral foundation of law to our people" and "a return to the knowledge of God in our land".

Additionally, Moore acknowledged an explicit theistic intent in placing the monument, agreeing that the monument "reflects the sovereignty of God over the affairs of men" and "acknowledge[s] God's overruling power over the affairs of men". However, in Moore's view this did not violate the doctrine of separation of church and state; as the presiding judge later summarized it, Moore argued that "the Judeo-Christian God reigned over both the church and the state in this country, and that both owed allegiance to that God", although they must keep their affairs separate.

On November 18, 2002, District Court Judge Myron H. Thompson held the monument violated the Establishment Clause of the First Amendment to the U.S. Constitution:

If all Chief Justice Moore had done were to emphasize the Ten Commandments' historical and educational importance ... or their importance as a model code for good citizenship ... this court would have a much different case before it. But the Chief Justice did not limit himself to this; he went far, far beyond. He installed a two-and-a-half ton monument in the most prominent place in a government building, managed with dollars from all state taxpayers, with the specific purpose and effect of establishing a permanent recognition of the 'sovereignty of God,' the Judeo-Christian God, over all citizens in this country, regardless of each taxpaying citizen's individual personal beliefs or lack thereof. To this, the Establishment Clause says no.

Judge Thompson's decision mandated that Moore remove the monument from the Heflin-Torbert Judicial Building by January 3, 2003, but stayed this order on December 23, 2002, after Moore appealed the decision to the Eleventh Circuit Court of Appeals.

== Court of Appeals decision ==
A three-judge panel of the Eleventh Circuit unanimously affirmed the original decision on July 1, 2003, agreeing that "the monument fails two of Lemon's three prongs. It violates the Establishment Clause." Additionally, the court noted that different religious traditions assign different wordings to the Ten Commandments, meaning that "choosing which version of the Ten Commandments to display can have religious endorsement implications".

After the decision of the Court of Appeals, Moore did not ask the court for a rehearing, nor did he request the Court of Appeals to stay its mandate pending the filing of a petition to the United States Supreme Court for a writ of certiorari. On July 30, 2003, having received no request to stay the mandate, the Court of Appeals issued its mandate to the District Court.

== Subsequent developments ==
On August 5, 2003, the District Court entered its "Final Judgment and Injunction," and enjoined Chief Justice Moore, his officers, agents, servants, and employees and those persons in active concert or participation with him who received actual notice of this injunction from "failing to remove, by no later than August 20, 2003, the Ten Commandments monument at issue in this litigation from the non-private areas of the Alabama State Judicial Building."

On August 14, 2003, Moore stated publicly that he would not comply with the injunction issued to him by the District Court:

As Chief Justice of the State of Alabama, it is my duty to administer the justice system of our state, not to destroy it. I have no intention of removing the monument of the Ten Commandments and the moral foundation of our law. To do so would, in effect, result in the [be a] disestablishment of our system of Justice in this State. This I cannot and will not do!

The time limit for removal expired on August 20, with the monument still in place in the building's rotunda. As specified in Judge Thompson's order, the state of Alabama faced fines of $5,000 a day until the monument was removed. On August 21, 2003, when Moore failed to comply with the August 5, 2003, Order of the District Court, the eight Associate Justices of the Supreme Court of Alabama issued an order recognizing that "[t]he refusal of officers of this Court to obey a binding order of a federal court of competent jurisdiction would impair the authority and ability of all of the courts of this State to enforce their judgments," and issued an order countermanding the "administrative decision of the Chief Justice to disregard the writ of injunction of the United States District Court for the Middle District of Alabama" and ordered "that the Building Manager of the Alabama Judicial Building be, and the same hereby is, DIRECTED to take all steps necessary to comply with the injunction as soon as practicable."

In a later case, McGinley v. Houston et al., another lawyer sued Gorman Houston, the Senior Associate Justice of the Alabama Supreme Court, and the other justices for removing the monument. The suit was dismissed on the grounds that removing a monument of the Ten Commandments does not constitute an establishment of religion.

Chief Justice Moore was later removed from office for judicial misconduct for failing to comply with the order of the federal court.

== See also ==
- Stone v. Graham (1980)
- Van Orden v. Perry (2005)
- McCreary County v. American Civil Liberties Union (2005)
- Pleasant Grove City v. Summum (2009)
- Green v. Haskell County Board of Commissioners (10th Cir. 2009)
- Supreme Court of Alabama
- Heflin-Torbert Judicial Building
