= Congressional Muslim Staffer Association =

Islamic organization based in the United States

- Abbreviation: CMSA
- Location: United States

The Congressional Muslim Staff Association (CMSA) is a non-partisan, bicameral organization that strives to improve the institution of Congress by serving Muslim staffers on Capitol Hill and create a pipeline for young Muslims who aspire to serve their country.

According to Roll Call, the CMSA was "largely dormant" from 2017 until its revival in 2023.
