= Mathew Staver =

American lawyer and activist

Mathew D. Staver
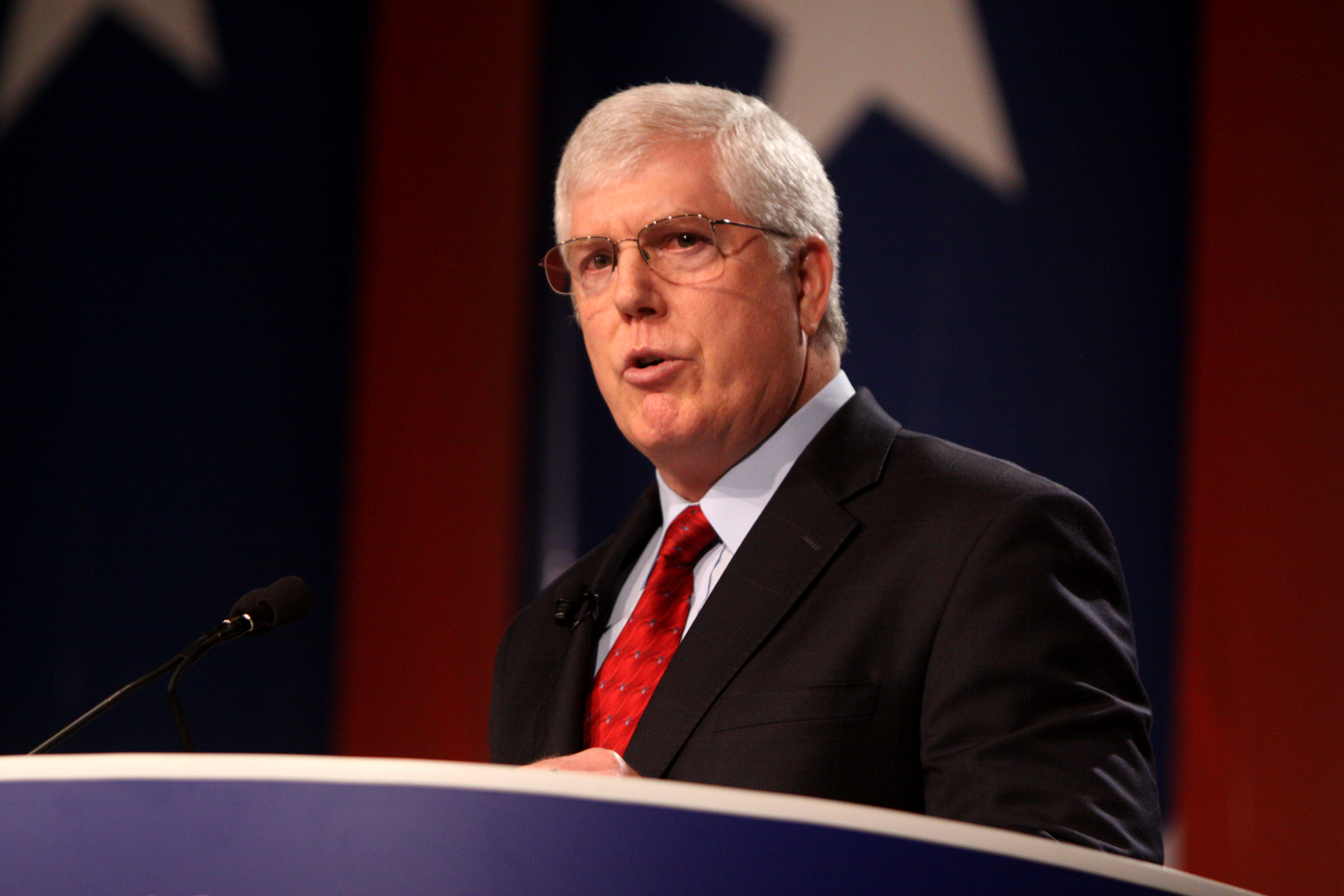
- Education: Southern Missionary College (BA); Andrews University (MA); University of Kentucky (JD)
- Occupation: Attorney
- Employer: Liberty Counsel
- Known for: Litigation for religious freedom, against abortion and LGBTQ rights
- Title: Chairman of Liberty Counsel Action
- Spouse: Anita Staver
- Website: https://www.lc.org/mat-staver

Mathew D. "Mat" Staver is an American lawyer and former pastor of several Seventh-day Adventist churches who became a Southern Baptist. He is a former dean of Liberty University's law school. In 1989, he founded the nonprofit organization Liberty Counsel, where he serves as chairman. ProPublica called him "a leading Christian legal theorist."

== Education ==
Staver received a B.A. in theology from Southern Missionary College, an M.A. in religion from Andrews University, and a Juris Doctor from the University of Kentucky. During college he began a process which led him to later leave the SDA church and eventually attend a Southern Baptist church.

== Career ==
He was the pastor of three churches in Kentucky that belonged to an evangelical Protestant denomination known as the Christian Church.

In 1990, he criticized the ACLU's efforts that led to removal of a Latin cross from the top of the St. Cloud, Florida water tower, stating that Liberty Counsel would be "a Christian antithesis to the ACLU."

In 2000, he represented absentee voters in the Bush v. Gore election case.

A Young Earth creationist who believes that intelligent design should be taught in public schools, Staver also denies Darwinian evolution.

He has argued before the Supreme Court of the United States twice, before most of the federal courts of appeals, and has testified before the United States Congress.

In 2005, he opposed the nomination of Harriet Miers to the United States Supreme Court.

Staver served as the dean of the Liberty University School of Law from 2006 to 2014.

In 2011, he was added to the Commission on Accountability and Policy for Religious Organizations, which was established by Iowa Senator Chuck Grassley.

In October 2015, Staver claimed that 100,000 people gathered in Peru to support Kim Davis in support of her refusal to issue marriage licenses. The event was shown to have happened more than a year earlier and was unrelated to Davis. Liberty Counsel issued a press release, stating that Staver had relied on a member of the Congress of the Republic of Peru for the information on the rally.

In 2016, Staver served on the resolutions committee for the Southern Baptist Convention.

In late 2018, he voiced his opposition to including gender identity and sexual orientation in a Senate bill that would make lynching a federal crime. Staver "pushed back against mainstream media coverage, and explained that while no one can or should oppose a bill banning lynching, there were provisions in it that served an ill purpose."

In 2020, he represented a Tampa, Florida pastor who was arrested for holding church services when the county had mandated churches to close. Charges against the pastor were later dropped.

Staver favors allowing religious exemptions to COVID-19 vaccine mandates.

Staver practices law on behalf of Liberty Counsel.

Academic offices
Preceded by Bruce Green	Dean of Liberty University School of Law; 2006 – 2014	Succeeded by Keith Faulkner
Business positions
Preceded by New position	Chairman of Liberty Counsel; 1989-present	Succeeded by Incumbent
