= Van Orden v. Perry =

- Supreme Court of the United States

Argued March 2, 2005 Decided June 27, 2005
- Full case name: Thomas Van Orden v. Rick Perry, in his official capacity as Governor of Texas and Chairman, State Preservation Board, et al.
- Docket no.: 03-1500
- Citations: 545 U.S. 677 (more) 125 S. Ct. 2854; 162 L. Ed. 2d 607; 2005 U.S. LEXIS 5215; 18 Fla. L. Weekly Fed. S 494

Case history
- Prior: Judgment for defendant, 2002 U.S. Dist. LEXIS 26709 (W.D. Tex. Oct. 2, 2002); affirmed, 351 F.3d 173 (5th Cir. 2003); rehearing denied, 89 Fed. Appx. 905 (5th Cir. 2004); cert. granted, 543 U.S. 923 (2004).

Holding
- A Ten Commandments monument erected on the grounds of the Texas State Capitol did not violate the Establishment Clause, because the monument, when considered in context, conveyed a historic and social meaning rather than an intrusive religious endorsement.

Court membership
- Chief Justice William Rehnquist Associate Justices John P. Stevens · Sandra Day O'Connor; Antonin Scalia · Anthony Kennedy; David Souter · Clarence Thomas; Ruth Bader Ginsburg · Stephen Breyer

Case opinions
- Plurality: Rehnquist, joined by Scalia, Kennedy, Thomas
- Concurrence: Scalia
- Concurrence: Thomas
- Concurrence: Breyer (in judgment)
- Dissent: Stevens, joined by Ginsburg
- Dissent: O'Connor
- Dissent: Souter, joined by Stevens, Ginsburg

Laws applied
- U.S. Const. amend. I

Van Orden v. Perry, 545 U.S. 677 (2005), is a United States Supreme Court case involving whether a display of the Ten Commandments on a monument given to the government at the Texas State Capitol in Austin violated the Establishment Clause of the First Amendment.

In a suit brought by Thomas Van Orden of Austin, the United States Court of Appeals for the Fifth Circuit ruled in November 2003 that the displays were constitutional, on the grounds that the monument conveyed both a religious and secular message. Van Orden appealed, and in October 2004 the high court agreed to hear the case at the same time as it heard McCreary County v. ACLU of Kentucky, a similar case challenging a display of the Ten Commandments at two county courthouses in Kentucky.

The Supreme Court ruled on June 27, 2005, by a vote of 5 to 4, that the display was constitutional. The Court chose not to employ the oft-used Lemon test in its analysis, reasoning that the display at issue was a "passive monument." Instead, the Court looked to "the nature of the monument and ... our Nation's history." Chief Justice William Rehnquist delivered the plurality opinion of the Court; Justice Stephen Breyer concurred in the judgment but wrote separately. The similar case of McCreary County v. ACLU of Kentucky was handed down the same day with the opposite result (also with a 5 to 4 decision). The "swing vote" in both cases was Breyer.

== Background ==
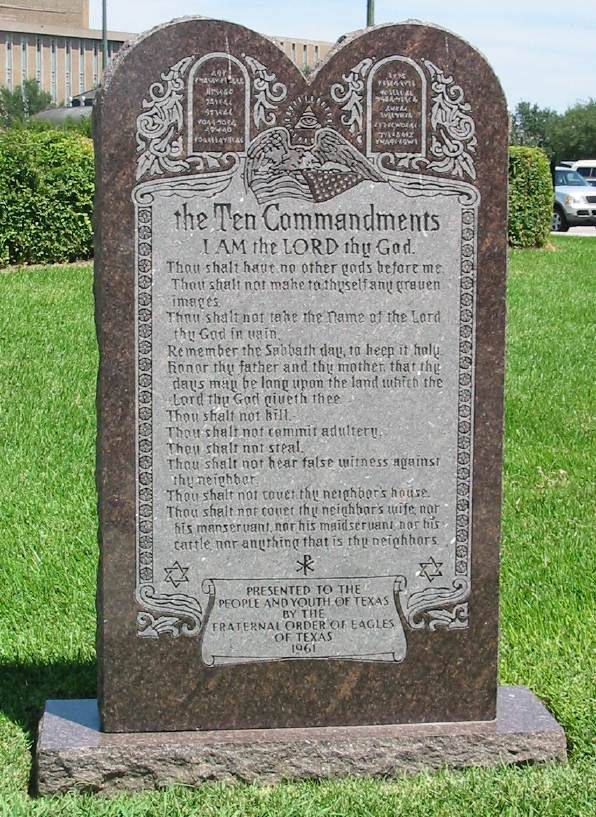
Ten Commandments Monument at the Texas State Capitol

The monument under challenge was 6-feet high and 3-feet wide which was installed in 1961. It was donated to the State of Texas by the Fraternal Order of Eagles, a civic organization, who paid in full for the cost of the statute. The State accepted the monument and selected a site for it based on the recommendation of the state agency responsible for maintaining the Capitol grounds. The donating organization paid for its erection. Two state legislators presided over the dedication of the monument.

The monument was erected on the Capitol grounds, behind the capitol building (between the Texas Capitol and Supreme Court buildings). The surrounding 22 acres (89,000 m^{2}) contained 17 monuments and 21 historical markers commemorating the "people, ideals, and events that compose Texan identity."

The monument depicts the text of the Ten Commandments, an eagle grasping the American flag, an Eye of Providence, and two small tablets with what appears to be an ancient script carved above the text of the Ten Commandments. Below the text are two Stars of David and the superimposed Greek letters Chi and Rho, which represent Christ. The bottom of the monument bears the inscription in capitals "Presented to the People and Youth of Texas by The Fraternal Order of Eagles of Texas 1961."

== Legal background ==
When Van Orden was decided in 2005 there were multiple tests for Establishment Clause analysis. These were the Lemon Test, the neutrality test and the endorsement test articulated by Justice Sandra Day O'Connor in Lynch v. Donnelly (1984). The endorsement test had two parts: whether the state involvement had a secular purpose (based on the Lemon test) and whether a reasonable objective observer would perceive the state involvement as endorsing or sponsoring religion.

== Procedural background ==
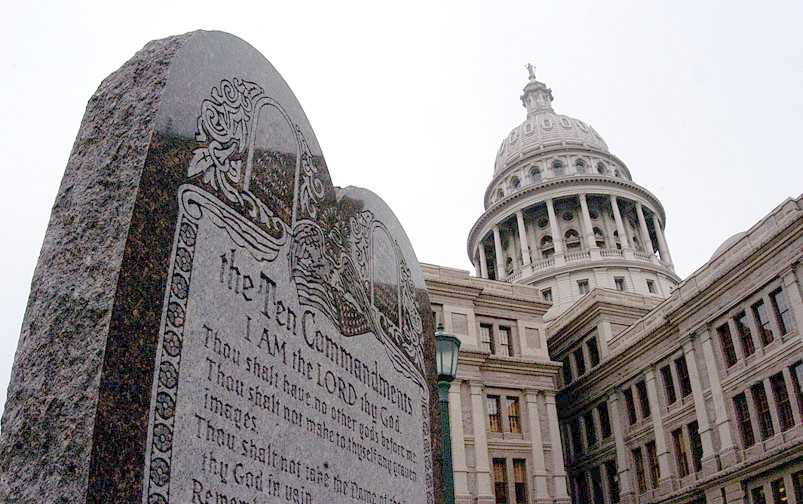
Monument with State Capitol in background

Thomas Van Orden challenged the constitutionality of the monument. A native Texan, Van Orden passed by the monument frequently when he would go to the Texas Supreme Court building to use its law library. Van Orden sued under 42 U.S.C. § 1983 claiming an Establishment Clause violation and seeking an injunction for the removal of the statue. The District Court held that the State had a "valid secular purpose" in accepting the statute from the Fraternal Order of Eagles in recognition of their civic "efforts to reduce juvenile delinquency", and that a reasonable person would not interpret the monument as an endorsement of religion. The Court of Appeals for the 5th Circuit upheld the District Court's about the secular purpose and non-endorsement effect of displaying the statue.

The appeal of the 5th Circuit's decision was argued by Erwin Chemerinsky, the Alston & Bird Professor of Law at Duke University School of Law, who represented Van Orden on a pro bono basis. Texas' case was argued by Texas Attorney General Greg Abbott. An amicus curiae was presented on behalf of the respondents (the state of Texas) by then-Solicitor General Paul Clement.

== Plurality opinion ==
The plurality opinion by Chief Justice Rehnquist stated that the Establishment Clause allowed the monument to be displayed on the grounds of the Texas State Capitol. Although the Lemon Test has not been overruled the plurality did not think it was "useful in dealing with the sort of passive monument that Texas has erected on its Capitol grounds". Instead, they created a historic intent test: "There is an unbroken history of official acknowledgement by all three branches of government of the role of religion in American life from at least 1789".

This opinion, delivered on the final day of the court's 2004-2005 term, would prove to be Rehnquist's last opinion as Chief Justice. He would die of thyroid cancer two months later, on September 3, 2005.

== Concurrences ==
Justice Stephen Breyer concurs in the judgment, but not the plurality analysis. He looks to the purpose of the Religion Clauses to avoid the harmful social conflict based on religious divisiveness. He does not interpret the Establishment Clause to require hostility to the religious: "Such absolutism is not only inconsistent with our national traditions...but would also tend to promote the kind of social conflict the Establishment Clause seeks to avoid." He states that the current case is a borderline case that requires a fact-intensive legal judgment for which there is "no mechanical formula that can accurately draw the constitutional line in every case". Breyer states that the case can not be resolved solely on the fact that the text of the Commandments is religious:

On the one hand, the Commandments' text undeniably has a religious message, invoking, indeed emphasizing, the Deity. On the other hand, focusing on the text of the Commandments alone cannot conclusively resolve this case. Rather, to determine the message that the text here conveys, we must examine how the text is used. And that inquiry requires us to consider the context of the display.

He concurs in the judgment based on his analysis of other facts, including the length of time the display of the monument went unchallenged. Breyer says that removal of a longstanding monument based on the religious significance of the Ten Commandments text could create religious divisiveness :

This display has stood apparently uncontested for nearly two generations. That experience helps us understand that as a practical matter of degree this display is unlikely to prove divisive. And this matter of degree is, I believe, critical in a borderline case such as this one. At the same time to reach a contrary conclusion here, based primarily on the religious nature of the tablets' text would, I fear, lead the law to exhibit a hostility toward religion that has no place in our Establishment Clause traditions. Such a holding might well encourage disputes concerning the removal of longstanding depictions of the Ten Commandments from public buildings across the Nation. And it could thereby create the very kind of religiously based divisiveness that the Establishment Clause seeks to avoid. Zelman, 536 U.S. at 717-729 (Breyer, J., dissenting)

Scalia's concurrence calls for "adopting an Establishment Clause jurisprudence that is in accord with our Nation's past and present practices, and that can be consistently applied". Clarence Thomas argues that the Establishment Clause should not be incorporated and that a jurisprudence that adopted a coercion requirement would be easier for Courts to apply: "Courts would not act as theological commissions, judging the meaning of religious matters."

== Stevens' dissent ==
Stevens' dissenting opinion essentially stated that, in formulating a ruling for this case, the court had to consider whether the display had any significant relation to the specific and secular history of the state of Texas or the United States as a whole. Ultimately, Stevens asserted that the display "has no purported connection to God's role in the formation of Texas or the founding of our Nation" and therefore could not be protected on the basis that it was a display dealing with secular ideals. In fact, Stevens says that the display transmits the message that Texas specifically endorses the Judeo-Christian values of the display and thus violates the establishment clause.

== See also ==
- List of United States Supreme Court cases, volume 545
- Stone v. Graham (1980)
- Glassroth v. Moore (11th Cir. 2003)
- McCreary County v. American Civil Liberties Union (2005)
- Pleasant Grove City v. Summum (2009)
- Green v. Haskell County Board of Commissioners (10th Cir. 2009)

== Sources ==
- Van Orden v. Perry, oral arguments and opinions on Oyez.org
- U.S. Supreme Court docket for 03-1500 Van Orden v. Perry
- Van Orden v. Perry First Amendment Center online library (archived)
- Supreme Court on a Shoestring, Sylvia Moreno, The Washington Post, February 21, 2005
- Supreme Court splits on Ten Commandments, Warren Richey, Christian Science Monitor, June 28, 2005
