= 2022 term United States Supreme Court opinions of Neil Gorsuch =

Views of Justice Neil Gorsuch in 2022

The 2022 term of the Supreme Court of the United States began October 3, 2022, and concluded October 1, 2023. This was the seventh term of Associate Justice Neil Gorsuch's tenure on the Court.
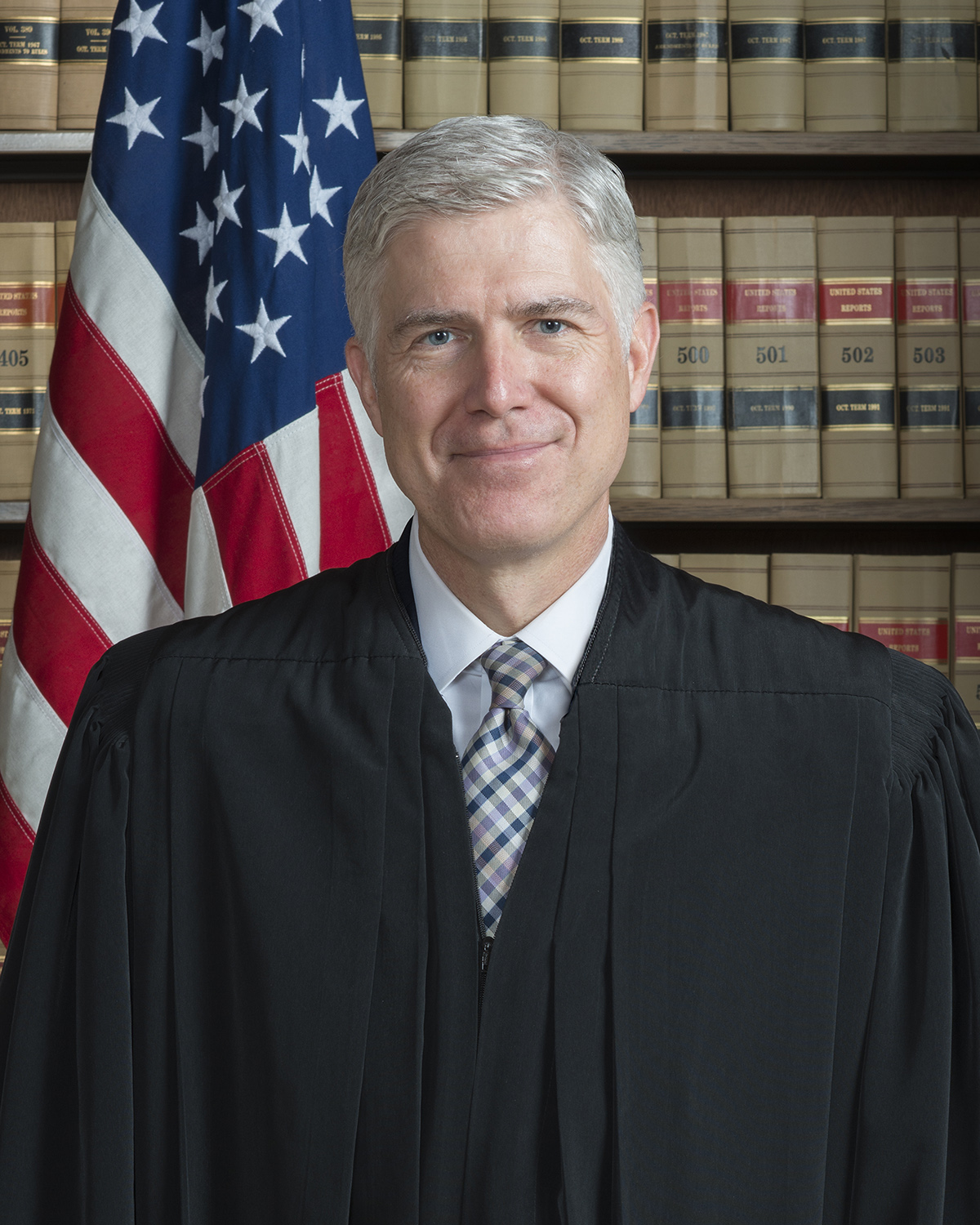

Neil Gorsuch 2022 term statistics

7	Majority or plurality	10	Concurrence	2	Other
8	Dissent	1	Concurrence/dissent	Total =	28
Bench opinions = 21		Opinions relating to orders = 7		In-chambers opinions = 0
Unanimous opinions: 3		Most joined by: Thomas (10)		Least joined by: Kagan (4 in full, 1 in part)

Type	Case	Citation	Issues	Joined by	Other opinions
	Buffington v. McDonough	598 U.S. ___ (2022)			
Gorsuch dissented from the Court's denial of certiorari.
	Khorrami v. Arizona	598 U.S. ___ (2022)			
Gorsuch dissented from the Court's denial of certiorari.
	Arizona v. Mayorkas	598 U.S. ___ (2022)		Jackson	
Gorsuch dissented from the Court's grant of application for stay.
	Toth v. United States	598 U.S. ___ (2023)			
Gorsuch dissented from the Court's denial of certiorari.
	Helix Energy Solutions Group, Inc. v. Hewitt	598 U.S. ___ (2023)			Kagan; Kavanaugh
	Bittner v. United States	598 U.S. ___ (2023)		Jackson; Roberts, Alito, Kavanaugh (in part)	Barrett
	City of Ocala v. Rojas	598 U.S. ___ (2023)			Thomas
Gorsuch filed a statement respecting the Court's denial of certiorari.
	Luna Perez v. Sturgis Public Schools	598 U.S. ___ (2023)		Unanimous	
	Donziger v. United States	598 U.S. ___ (2023)		Kavanaugh	
Gorsuch dissented from the Court's denial of certiorari.
	Axon Enterprise, Inc. v. Federal Trade Commission	598 U.S. ___ (2023)			Kagan; Thomas
	Türkiye Halk Bankası A.Ş. v. United States	598 U.S. ___ (2023)		Alito	Kavanaugh
	Percoco v. United States	598 U.S. ___ (2023)		Thomas	Alito
	National Pork Producers Council v. Ross	598 U.S. ___ (2023)		Thomas; Sotomayor, Kagan, Barrett (in part)	Sotomayor; Barrett; Roberts; Kavanaugh
	Andy Warhol Foundation for the Visual Arts, Inc. v. Goldsmith	598 U.S. ___ (2023)		Jackson	Sotomayor; Kagan
	Amgen Inc. v. Sanofi	598 U.S. ___ (2023)		Unanimous	
	Arizona v. Mayorkas	598 U.S. ___ (2023)			
	Tyler v. Hennepin County	598 U.S. ___ (2023)		Jackson	Roberts
	Slack Technologies, LLC v. Pirani	598 U.S. ___ (2023)		Unanimous	
	Dubin v. United States	599 U.S. ___ (2023)			Sotomayor
	Jack Daniel's Properties, Inc. v. VIP Products LLC	599 U.S. ___ (2023)		Thomas, Barrett	Kagan; Sotomayor
	Health and Hospital Corporation of Marion County v. Talevski	599 U.S. ___ (2023)		Roberts	Jackson; Barrett; Thomas; Alito
	Haaland v. Brackeen	599 U.S. ___ (2023)		Sotomayor, Jackson (in part)	Barrett; Kavanaugh; Thomas; Alito
	Lac du Flambeau Band of Lake Superior Chippewa Indians v. Coughlin	599 U.S. ___ (2023)			Jackson; Thomas
	Arizona v. Navajo Nation	599 U.S. ___ (2023)		Sotomayor, Kagan, Jackson	Kavanaugh; Thomas
	United States v. Texas	599 U.S. ___ (2023)		Thomas, Barrett	Kavanaugh; Barrett; Alito
	Mallory v. Norfolk Southern Railway Co.	600 U.S. ___ (2023)		Thomas, Sotomayor, Jackson; Alito (in part)	Jackson; Alito; Barrett
	Students for Fair Admissions, Inc. v. President and Fellows of Harvard College	600 U.S. ___ (2023)		Thomas	Roberts; Thomas; Kavanaugh; Sotomayor; Jackson
	303 Creative LLC v. Elenis	600 U.S. ___ (2023)		Roberts, Thomas, Alito, Kavanaugh, Barrett	Sotomayor
