= 2022 term United States Supreme Court opinions of Ketanji Brown Jackson =

The 2022 term of the Supreme Court of the United States began October 3, 2022, and concluded October 1, 2023. This was the first term of Associate Justice Ketanji Brown Jackson's tenure on the Court.
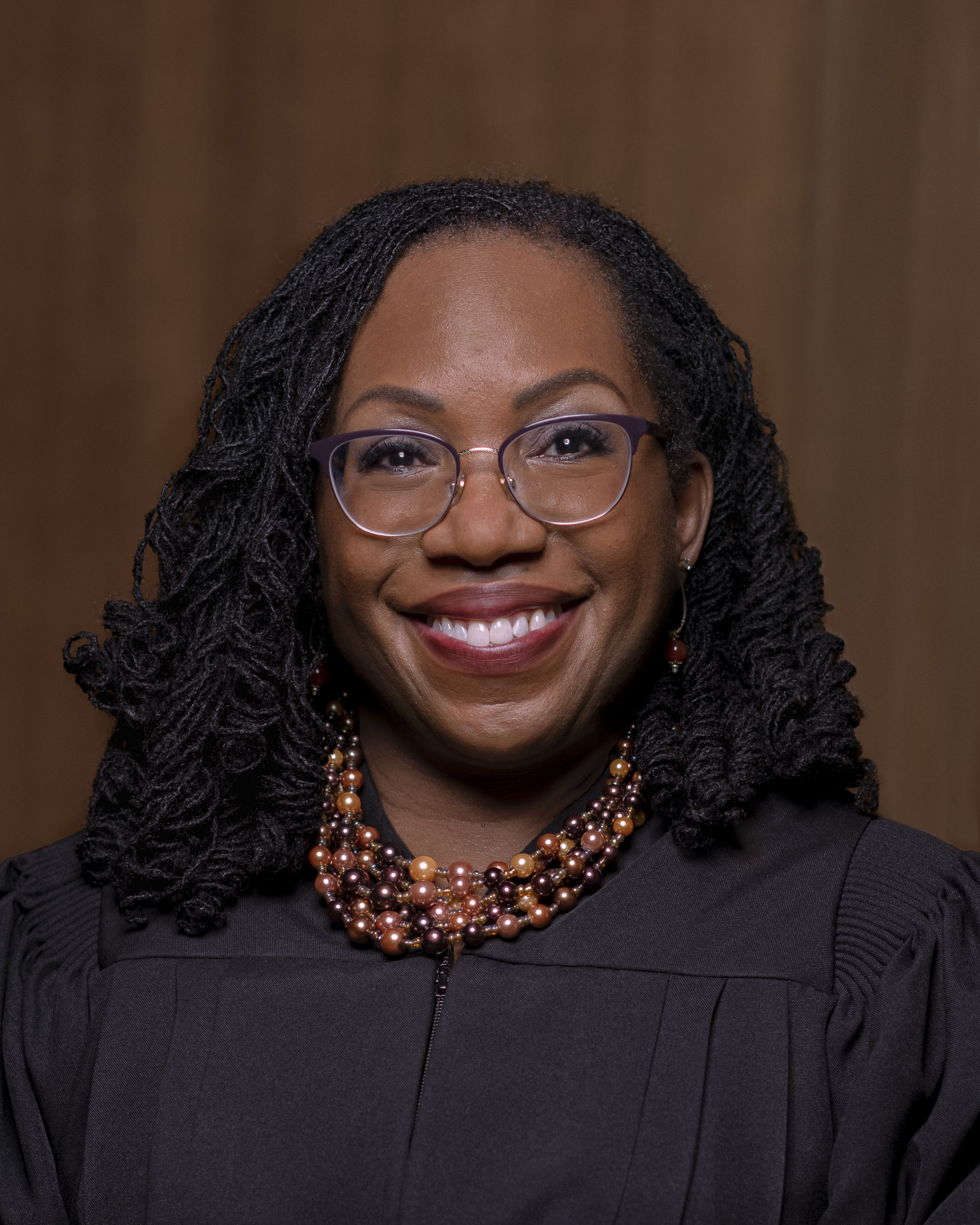

Ketanji Brown Jackson 2022 term statistics

6	Majority or plurality	5	Concurrence	0	Other
13	Dissent	0	Concurrence/dissent	Total =	24
Bench opinions = 18		Opinions relating to orders = 6		In-chambers opinions = 0
Unanimous opinions: 2		Most joined by: Sotomayor (14)		Least joined by: Thomas (2 in full, 2 in part)

Type	Case	Citation	Issues	Joined by	Other opinions
	Chinn v. Shoop	598 U.S. ___ (2022)		Sotomayor	
Jackson dissented from the Court's denial of certiorari.
	Johnson v. Missouri	598 U.S. ___ (2022)		Sotomayor	
Jackson dissented from the Court's denial of application for stay of execution.
	Davis v. United States	598 U.S. ___ (2023)		Sotomayor	
Jackson dissented from the Court's denial of certiorari.
	Delaware v. Pennsylvania	598 U.S. ___ (2023)		Roberts, Sotomayor, Kagan, Kavanaugh; Thomas, Alito, Gorsuch, Barrett (in part)	
	Chapman v. Doe	598 U.S. ___ (2023)			
Jackson dissented from the Court's grant of certiorari, summary vacatur, and remand.
	Brown v. Louisiana	598 U.S. ___ (2023)		Sotomayor, Kagan	
Jackson dissented from the Court's denial of certiorari.
	MOAC Mall Holdings LLC v. Transform Holdco LLC	598 U.S. ___ (2023)		Unanimous	
	Santos-Zacaria v. Garland	598 U.S. ___ (2023)		Roberts, Sotomayor, Kagan, Gorsuch, Kavanaugh, Barrett	Alito
	Polselli v. Internal Revenue Service	598 U.S. ___ (2023)		Gorsuch	Roberts
	Twitter, Inc. v. Taamneh	598 U.S. ___ (2023)			Thomas
	Glacier Northwest, Inc. v. Teamsters	598 U.S. ___ (2023)			Barrett; Thomas; Alito
	Health and Hospital Corporation of Marion County v. Talevski	599 U.S. ___ (2023)		Roberts, Sotomayor, Kagan, Gorsuch, Kavanaugh, Barrett	Gorsuch; Barrett; Thomas; Alito
	Lac du Flambeau Band of Lake Superior Chippewa Indians v. Coughlin	599 U.S. 382 (2023)		Roberts, Alito, Sotomayor, Kagan, Kavanaugh, Barrett	Thomas; Gorsuch
	Lora v. United States	599 U.S. ___ (2023)		Unanimous	
	Jones v. Hendrix	599 U.S. ___ (2023)			Thomas; Sotomayor and Kagan
	Pugin v. Garland	599 U.S. ___ (2023)			Kavanaugh; Sotomayor
	Samia v. United States	599 U.S. ___ (2023)			Thomas; Barrett; Kagan
	Coinbase, Inc. v. Bielski	599 U.S. ___ (2023)		Sotomayor, Kagan; Thomas (in part)	Kavanaugh
	United States v. Hansen	599 U.S. ___ (2023)		Sotomayor	Barrett; Thomas
	Mallory v. Norfolk Southern Railway Co.	600 U.S. ___ (2023)			Gorsuch; Alito; Barrett
	Abitron Austria GmbH v. Hetronic International, Inc.	600 U.S. ___ (2023)			Alito; Sotomayor
	Students for Fair Admissions, Inc. v. University of North Carolina	600 U.S. ___ (2023)		Sotomayor, Kagan	Roberts; Thomas; Gorsuch; Kavanaugh; Sotomayor
	Harness v. Watson	600 U.S. ___ (2023)		Sotomayor	
Jackson dissented from the Court's denial of certiorari.
