= 2022 term United States Supreme Court opinions of Clarence Thomas =

The 2022 term of the Supreme Court of the United States began October 3, 2022, and concluded October 1, 2023. This was the thirty-second term of Associate Justice Clarence Thomas's tenure on the Court.
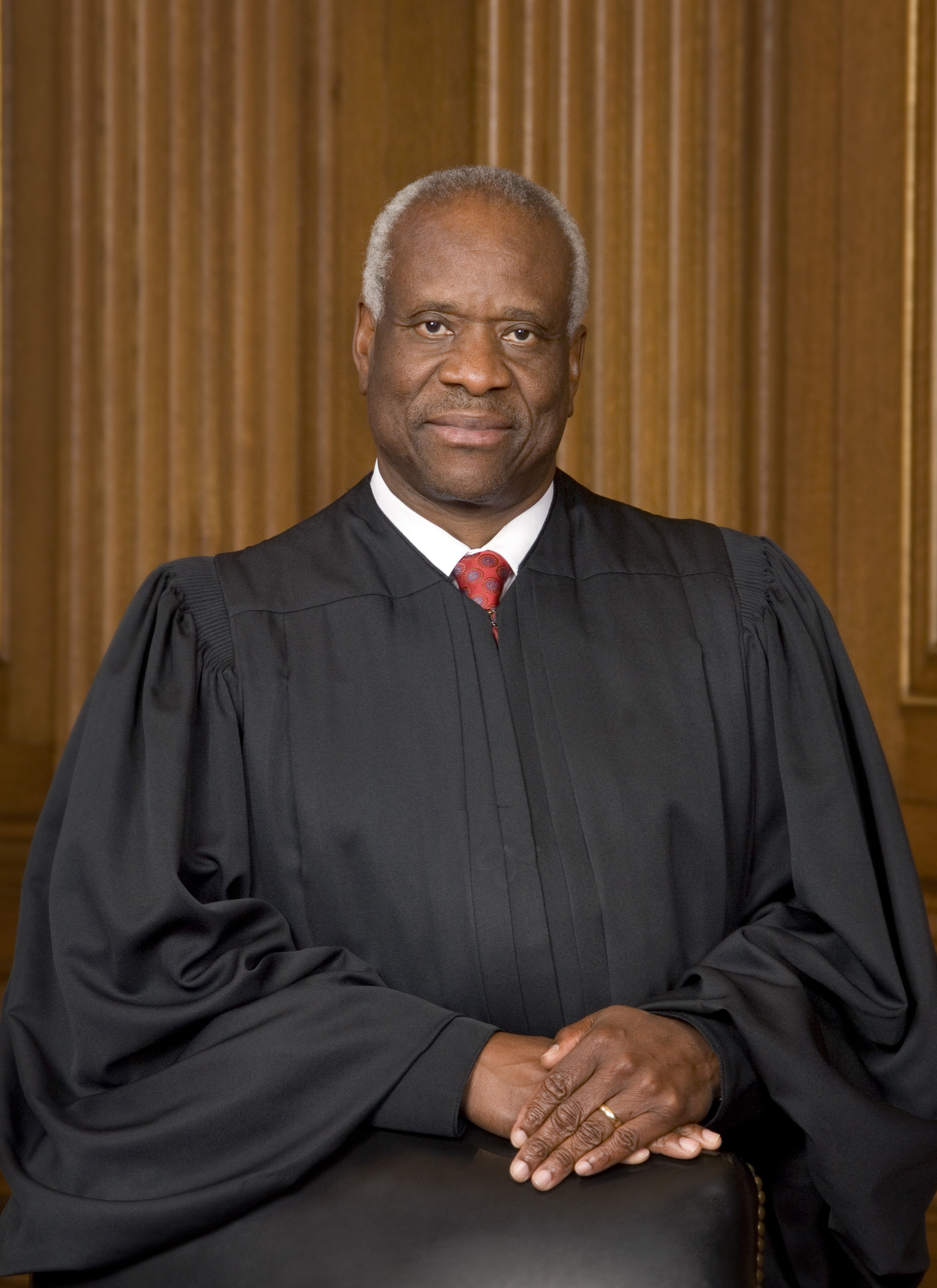

Clarence Thomas 2022 term statistics

6	Majority or plurality	7	Concurrence	0	Other
14	Dissent	0	Concurrence/dissent	Total =	27
Bench opinions = 22		Opinions relating to orders = 5		In-chambers opinions = 0
Unanimous opinions: 3		Most joined by: Gorsuch (11)		Least joined by: Sotomayor, Kagan, Jackson (4)

Type	Case	Citation	Issues	Joined by	Other opinions
	Clendening v. United States	598 U.S. ___ (2022)			
Thomas dissented from the Court's denial of certiorari.
	Shoop v. Cunningham	598 U.S. ___ (2022)		Alito, Gorsuch	
Thomas dissented from the Court's denial of certiorari.
	City of Ocala v. Rojas	598 U.S. ___ (2023)			Gorsuch
Thomas dissented from the Court's denial of certiorari.
	Wilkins v. United States	598 U.S. ___ (2023)		Roberts, Alito	Sotomayor
	Axon Enterprise, Inc. v. Federal Trade Commission	598 U.S. ___ (2023)			Kagan; Gorsuch
	Reed v. Goertz	598 U.S. ___ (2023)			Kavanaugh; Alito
	Ciminelli v. United States	598 U.S. ___ (2023)		Unanimous	Alito
	Financial Oversight and Management Board for Puerto Rico v. Centro de Periodismo Investigativo, Inc.	598 U.S. ___ (2023)			Kagan
	Hamm v. Smith	598 U.S. ___ (2023)		Alito	
Thomas dissented from the Court's denial of certiorari.
	Ohio Adjutant General's Department v. Federal Labor Relations Authority	598 U.S. ___ (2023)		Roberts, Sotomayor, Kagan, Kavanaugh, Barrett, Jackson	Alito
	Twitter, Inc. v. Taamneh	598 U.S. ___ (2023)		Unanimous	Jackson
	Sackett v. EPA	598 U.S. ___ (2023)		Gorsuch	Thomas; Kagan; Kavanaugh
	United States ex rel. Schutte v. Supervalu Inc.	598 U.S. ___ (2023)		Unanimous	
	Glacier Northwest, Inc. v. Teamsters	598 U.S. ___ (2023)		Gorsuch	Barrett; Alito; Jackson
	Allen v. Milligan	599 U.S. ___ (2023)		Gorsuch; Alito, Barrett (in part)	Roberts; Kavanaugh; Alito
	Health and Hospital Corporation of Marion County v. Talevski	599 U.S. ___ (2023)			Jackson; Gorsuch; Barrett; Alito
	Haaland v. Brackeen	599 U.S. ___ (2023)			Barrett; Gorsuch; Kavanaugh; Alito
	Lac du Flambeau Band of Lake Superior Chippewa Indians v. Coughlin	599 U.S. ___ (2023)			Jackson; Gorsuch
	United States ex rel. Polansky v. Executive Health Resources, Inc.	599 U.S. ___ (2023)			Kagan; Kavanaugh
	Jones v. Hendrix	599 U.S. ___ (2023)		Roberts, Alito, Gorsuch, Kavanaugh, Barrett	Sotomayor and Kagan; Jackson
	Arizona v. Navajo Nation	599 U.S. ___ (2023)			Kavanaugh; Gorsuch
	Samia v. United States	599 U.S. ___ (2023)		Roberts, Alito, Gorsuch, Kavanaugh; Barrett (in part)	Barrett; Kagan; Jackson
	United States v. Hansen	599 U.S. ___ (2023)			Barrett; Jackson
	Waleski v. Montgomery, McCracken, Walker & Rhoads, LLP	599 U.S. ___ (2023)		Gorsuch, Barrett	
Thomas dissented from the Court's denial of certiorari.
	Moore v. Harper	600 U.S. ___ (2023)		Gorsuch; Alito (in part)	Roberts; Kavanaugh
	Counterman v. Colorado	600 U.S. ___ (2023)			Kagan; Sotomayor; Barrett
	Students for Fair Admissions, Inc. v. President and Fellows of Harvard College	600 U.S. ___ (2023)			Roberts; Gorsuch; Kavanaugh; Sotomayor; Jackson
