= 2022 term United States Supreme Court opinions of Amy Coney Barrett =

The 2022 term of the Supreme Court of the United States began October 3, 2022, and concluded October 1, 2023. This was the third term of Associate Justice Amy Coney Barrett's tenure on the Court.
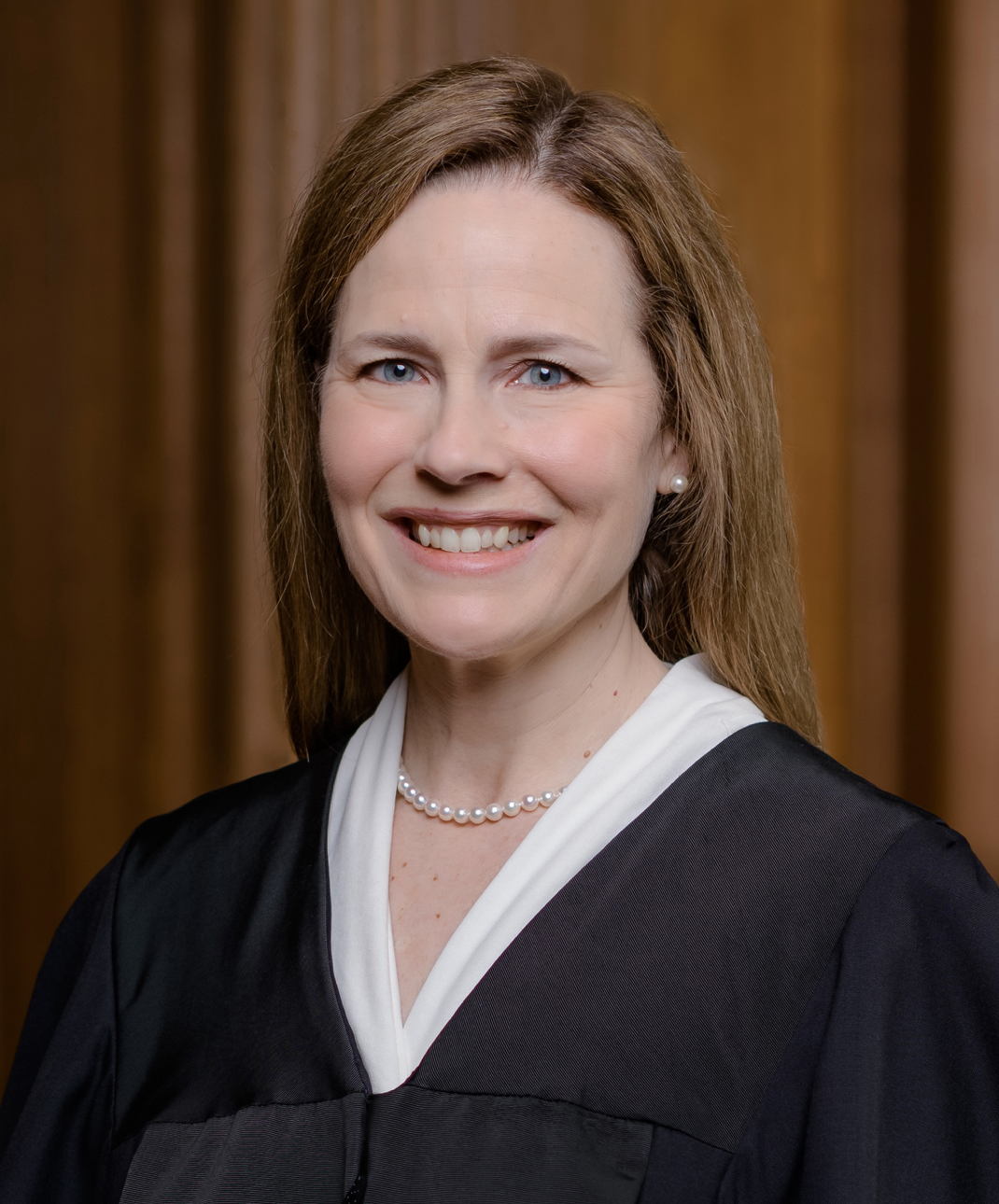

Amy Coney Barrett 2022 term statistics

6	Majority or plurality	5	Concurrence	0	Other
4	Dissent	0	Concurrence/dissent	Total =	15
Bench opinions = 15		Opinions relating to orders = 0		In-chambers opinions = 0
Unanimous opinions: 3		Most joined by: Roberts, Kagan (8)		Least joined by: Jackson (4)

Type	Case	Citation	Issues	Joined by	Other opinions
	Arellano v. McDonough	598 U.S. ___ (2023)		Unanimous	
	Cruz v. Arizona	598 U.S. ___ (2023)		Thomas, Alito, Gorsuch	Sotomayor
	Bartenwerfer v. Buckley	598 U.S. ___ (2023)		Unanimous	Sotomayor
	Bittner v. United States	598 U.S. ___ (2023)		Thomas, Sotomayor, Kagan	Gorsuch
	National Pork Producers Council v. Ross	598 U.S. ___ (2023)			Gorsuch; Sotomayor; Roberts; Kavanaugh
	Dupree v. Younger	598 U.S. ___ (2023)		Unanimous	
	Glacier Northwest, Inc. v. Teamsters	598 U.S. ___ (2023)		Roberts, Sotomayor, Kagan, Kavanaugh	Thomas; Alito; Jackson
	Health and Hospital Corporation of Marion County v. Talevski	599 U.S. ___ (2023)		Roberts	Jackson; Gorsuch; Thomas; Alito
	Haaland v. Brackeen	599 U.S. ___ (2023)		Roberts, Sotomayor, Kagan, Gorsuch, Kavanaugh, Jackson	Gorsuch; Kavanaugh; Thomas; Alito
	Samia v. United States	599 U.S. ___ (2023)			Thomas; Kagan; Jackson
	United States v. Texas	599 U.S. ___ (2023)		Gorsuch	Kavanaugh; Gorsuch; Alito
	United States v. Hansen	599 U.S. ___ (2023)		Roberts, Thomas, Alito, Kagan, Gorsuch, Kavanaugh	Thomas; Jackson
	Counterman v. Colorado	600 U.S. ___ (2023)		Thomas	Kagan; Sotomayor; Thomas
	Mallory v. Norfolk Southern Railway Co.	600 U.S. ___ (2023)		Roberts, Kagan, Kavanaugh	Gorsuch; Jackson; Alito
	Biden v. Nebraska	600 U.S. ___ (2023)			Roberts; Kagan
