= 2022 term United States Supreme Court opinions of Sonia Sotomayor =

The 2022 term of the Supreme Court of the United States began October 3, 2022, and concluded October 1, 2023. This was the fourteenth term of Associate Justice Sonia Sotomayor's tenure on the Court.
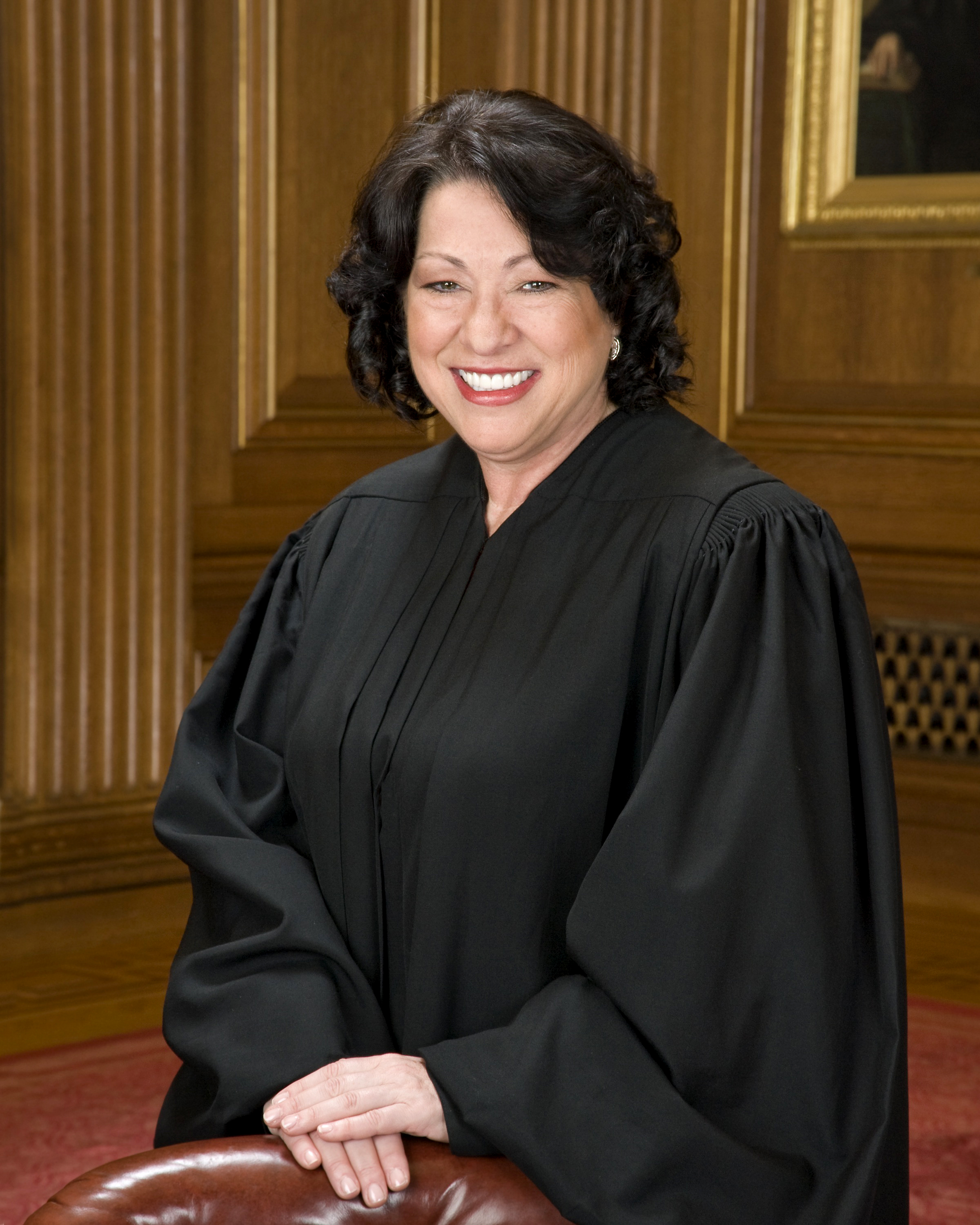

Sonia Sotomayor 2022 term statistics

5	Majority or plurality	6	Concurrence	1	Other
13	Dissent	0	Concurrence/dissent	Total =	25
Bench opinions = 16		Opinions relating to orders = 9		In-chambers opinions = 0
Unanimous opinions: 0		Most joined by: Jackson (14 in full, 1 in part)		Least joined by: Thomas (2)

Type	Case	Citation	Issues	Joined by	Other opinions
	Thomas v. Lumpkin	598 U.S. ___ (2022)		Kagan, Jackson	
Sotomayor dissented from the Court's denial of certiorari.
	Anthony v. Louisiana	598 U.S. ___ (2022)		Jackson	
Sotomayor dissented from the Court's denial of certiorari.
	Cruz v. Arizona	598 U.S. ___ (2023)		Roberts, Kagan, Kavanaugh, Jackson	Barrett
	Bartenwerfer v. Buckley	598 U.S. ___ (2023)		Jackson	Barrett
	Wilkins v. United States	598 U.S. ___ (2023)		Kagan, Gorsuch, Kavanaugh, Barrett, Jackson	Thomas
	Burns v. Mays	598 U.S. ___ (2023)		Kagan, Jackson	
Sotomayor dissented from the Court's denial of certiorari.
	National Pork Producers Council v. Ross	598 U.S. ___ (2023)		Kagan	Gorsuch; Barrett; Roberts; Kavanaugh
	Andy Warhol Foundation for the Visual Arts, Inc. v. Goldsmith	598 U.S. ___ (2023)		Thomas, Alito, Gorsuch, Kavanaugh, Barrett, Jackson	Gorsuch; Kagan
	Dubin v. United States	599 U.S. ___ (2023)		Roberts, Thomas, Alito, Kagan, Kavanaugh, Barrett, Jackson	Gorsuch
	Jack Daniel's Properties, Inc. v. VIP Products LLC	599 U.S. ___ (2023)		Alito	Kagan; Gorsuch
	Jones v. Hendrix	599 U.S. ___ (2023)			Thomas; Jackson
Signed jointly with Kagan.
	Yegiazaryan v. Smagin	599 U.S. ___ (2023)		Roberts, Kagan, Kavanaugh, Barrett, Jackson	Alito
	Pugin v. Garland	599 U.S. ___ (2023)		Gorsuch; Kagan (in part)	Kavanaugh; Jackson
	Counterman v. Colorado	600 U.S. ___ (2023)		Gorsuch (in part)	Kagan; Thomas; Barrett
	Abitron Austria GmbH v. Hetronic International, Inc.	600 U.S. ___ (2023)		Roberts, Kagan, Barrett	Alito; Jackson
	Groff v. DeJoy	600 U.S. ___ (2023)		Jackson	Alito
	Students for Fair Admissions, Inc. v. President and Fellows of Harvard College	600 U.S. ___ (2023)		Kagan; Jackson (in part)	Roberts; Thomas; Gorsuch; Kavanaugh; Jackson
	303 Creative LLC v. Elenis	600 U.S. ___ (2023)		Kagan, Jackson	Gorsuch
	McClinton v. United States	600 U.S. ___ (2023)			Kavanaugh; Alito
Sotomayor filed a statement respecting the Court's denial of certiorari.
	Lombardo v. St. Louis	600 U.S. ___ (2023)			
Sotomayor dissented from the Court's denial of certiorari.
	N.S. v. Kansas City Board of Police	600 U.S. ___ (2023)			
Sotomayor dissented from the Court's denial of certiorari.
	Clark v. Mississippi	600 U.S. ___ (2023)		Kagan, Jackson	
Sotomayor dissented from the Court's denial of certiorari.
	Barber v. Ivey	600 U.S. ___ (2023)		Kagan, Jackson	
Sotomayor dissented from the Court's denial of application for stay of execution.
	Johnson v. Vandergriff	600 U.S. ___ (2023)		Kagan, Jackson	
Sotomayor dissented from the Court's denial of certiorari and application for stay of execution.
