= 2022 term United States Supreme Court opinions of Brett Kavanaugh =

The 2022 term of the Supreme Court of the United States began October 3, 2022, and concluded October 1, 2023. This was the fifth term of Associate Justice Brett Kavanaugh's tenure on the Court.
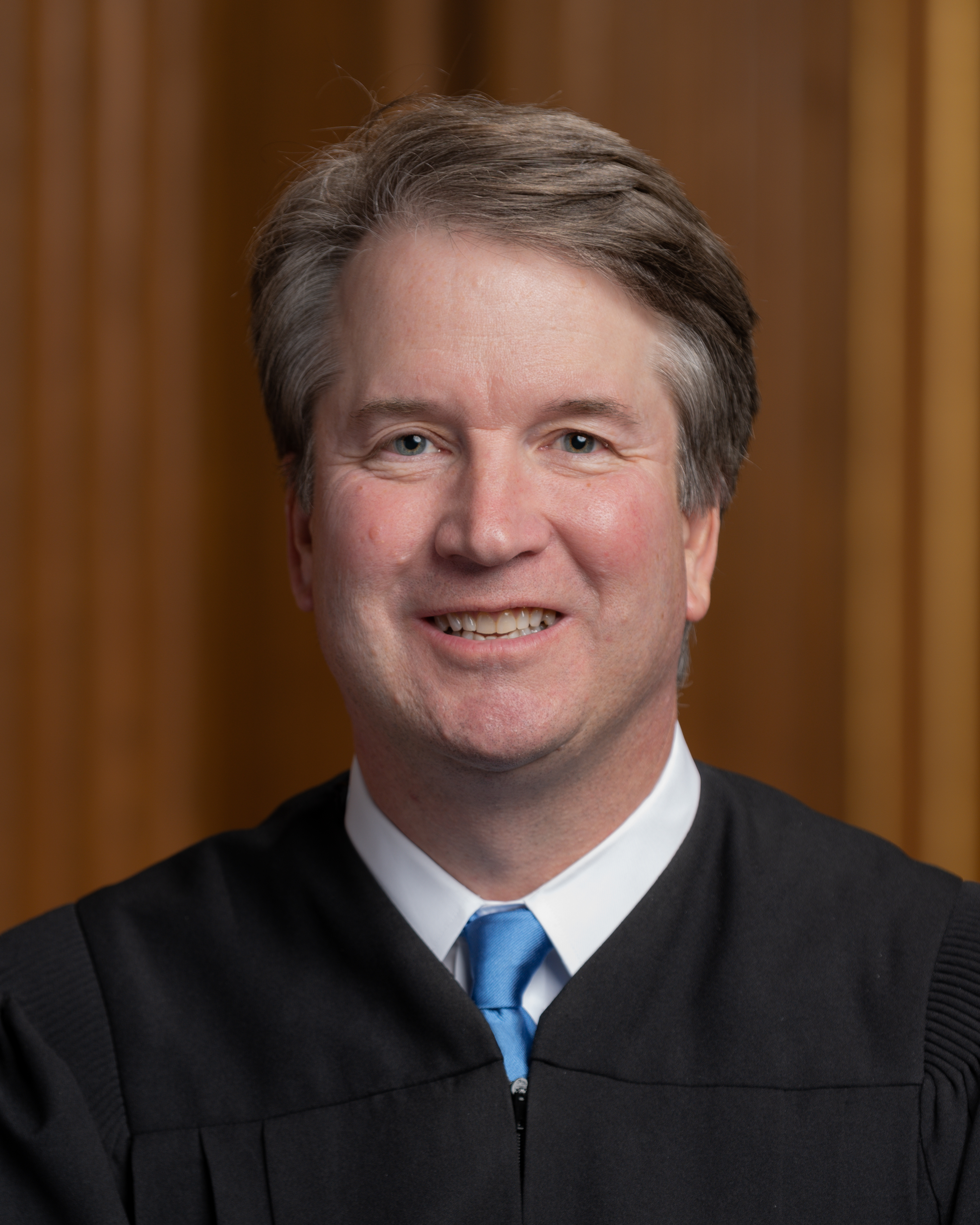

Brett Kavanaugh 2022 term statistics

7	Majority or plurality	6	Concurrence	2	Other
1	Dissent	1	Concurrence/dissent	Total =	17
Bench opinions = 15		Opinions relating to orders = 2		In-chambers opinions = 0
Unanimous opinions: 1		Most joined by: Barrett (8)		Least joined by: Gorsuch (3)

Type	Case	Citation	Issues	Joined by	Other opinions
	Helix Energy Solutions Group, Inc. v. Hewitt	598 U.S. ___ (2023)		Alito	Kagan; Gorsuch
	New York v. New Jersey	598 U.S. ___ (2023)		Unanimous	
	Reed v. Goertz	598 U.S. ___ (2023)		Roberts, Sotomayor, Kagan, Barrett, Jackson	Thomas; Alito
	Türkiye Halk Bankası A.Ş. v. United States	598 U.S. ___ (2023)		Roberts, Thomas, Sotomayor, Kagan, Barrett, Jackson	Gorsuch
	National Pork Producers Council v. Ross	598 U.S. ___ (2023)			Gorsuch; Sotomayor; Barrett; Roberts
	Sackett v. EPA	598 U.S. ___ (2023)		Sotomayor, Kagan, Jackson	Alito; Thomas; Kagan
	Allen v. Milligan	599 U.S. ___ (2023)			Roberts; Thomas; Alito
	Haaland v. Brackeen	599 U.S. ___ (2023)			Barrett; Gorsuch; Thomas; Alito
	United States ex rel. Polansky v. Executive Health Resources, Inc.	599 U.S. ___ (2023)		Barrett	Kagan; Thomas
	Arizona v. Navajo Nation	599 U.S. ___ (2023)		Roberts, Thomas, Alito, Barrett	Thomas; Gorsuch
	Pugin v. Garland	599 U.S. ___ (2023)		Roberts, Thomas, Alito, Barrett, Jackson	Jackson; Sotomayor
	United States v. Texas	599 U.S. ___ (2023)		Roberts, Sotomayor, Kagan, Jackson	Gorsuch; Barrett; Alito
	Coinbase, Inc. v. Bielski	599 U.S. ___ (2023)		Roberts, Alito, Gorsuch, Barrett	Jackson
	Moore v. Harper	600 U.S. ___ (2023)			Roberts; Thomas
	Students for Fair Admissions, Inc. v. President and Fellows of Harvard College	600 U.S. ___ (2023)			Roberts; Thomas; Gorsuch; Sotomayor; Jackson
	McClinton v. United States	600 U.S. ___ (2023)		Gorsuch, Barrett	Sotomayor; Alito
Kavanaugh filed a statement respecting the Court's denial of certiorari.
	City of Tulsa v. Hooper	600 U.S. ___ (2023)		Alito	
Kavanaugh filed a statement respecting the Court's denial of application for stay.
