= 2022 term United States Supreme Court opinions of Samuel Alito =

The 2022 term of the Supreme Court of the United States began October 3, 2022, and concluded October 1, 2023. This was the eighteenth term of Associate Justice Samuel Alito's tenure on the Court.
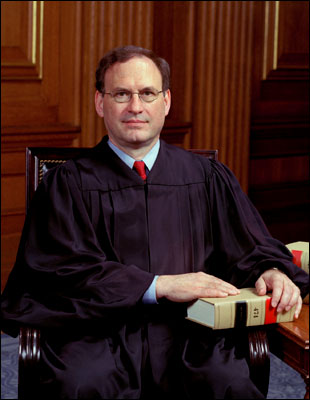

Samuel Alito 2022 term statistics

6	Majority or plurality	5	Concurrence	3	Other
10	Dissent	0	Concurrence/dissent	Total =	24
Bench opinions = 17		Opinions relating to orders = 7		In-chambers opinions = 0
Unanimous opinions: 3		Most joined by: Thomas (13)		Least joined by: Sotomayor, Kagan (4)

Type	Case	Citation	Issues	Joined by	Other opinions
	Antonyuk v. Nigrelli	598 U.S. ___ (2023)		Thomas	
Alito filed a statement respecting the Court's denial of application to vacate stay.
	West Virginia v. B. P. J.	598 U.S. ___ (2023)		Thomas	
Alito dissented from the Court's denial of application to vacate injunction.
	Reed v. Goertz	598 U.S. ___ (2023)		Gorsuch	Kavanaugh; Thomas
	Danco Laboratories, LLC v. Alliance for Hippocratic Medicine	598 U.S. ___ (2023)			
Alito dissented from the Court's grant of applications for stays.
	Ciminelli v. United States	598 U.S. ___ (2023)			Thomas
	Percoco v. United States	598 U.S. ___ (2023)		Roberts, Sotomayor, Kagan, Kavanaugh, Barrett; Jackson (in part)	Gorsuch
	Santos-Zacaria v. Garland	598 U.S. ___ (2023)		Thomas	Jackson
	Ohio Adjutant General's Department v. Federal Labor Relations Authority	598 U.S. ___ (2023)		Gorsuch	Thomas
	Sackett v. EPA	598 U.S. ___ (2023)		Roberts, Thomas, Gorsuch, Barrett	Thomas; Kagan; Kavanaugh
	Glacier Northwest, Inc. v. Teamsters	598 U.S. ___ (2023)		Thomas, Gorsuch	Barrett; Thomas; Jackson
	Allen v. Milligan	599 U.S. ___ (2023)		Gorsuch	Roberts; Kavanaugh; Thomas
	Health and Hospital Corporation of Marion County v. Talevski	599 U.S. ___ (2023)		Thomas	Jackson; Gorsuch; Barrett; Thomas
	Smith v. United States	599 U.S. ___ (2023)		Unanimous	
	Haaland v. Brackeen	599 U.S. ___ (2023)			Barrett; Gorsuch; Kavanaugh; Thomas
	Yegiazaryan v. Smagin	599 U.S. ___ (2023)		Thomas; Gorsuch (in part)	Sotomayor
	United States v. Texas	599 U.S. ___ (2023)			Kavanaugh; Gorsuch; Barrett
	Mallory v. Norfolk Southern Railway Co.	600 U.S. ___ (2023)			Gorsuch; Jackson; Barrett
	Abitron Austria GmbH v. Hetronic International, Inc.	600 U.S. ___ (2023)		Thomas, Gorsuch, Kavanaugh, Jackson	Jackson; Sotomayor
	Groff v. DeJoy	600 U.S. ___ (2023)		Unanimous	Sotomayor
	Department of Education v. Brown	600 U.S. ___ (2023)		Unanimous	
	McClinton v. United States	600 U.S. ___ (2023)			Sotomayor; Kavanaugh
Alito concurred in the Court's denial of certiorari.
	Kincaid v. Williams	600 U.S. ___ (2023)		Thomas	
Alito dissented from the Court's denial of certiorari.
	Roberts v. McDonald	600 U.S. ___ (2023)		Thomas	
Alito filed a statement respecting the Court's denial of certiorari.
	Thompson v. Henderson	600 U.S. ___ (2023)		Thomas	
Alito filed a statement respecting the Court's denial of certiorari.
	Moore v. United States	600 U.S. ___ (2023)			
Alito declined to recuse himself from a case.
