= 2022 term United States Supreme Court opinions of Elena Kagan =

The 2022 term of the Supreme Court of the United States began October 3, 2022, and concluded October 1, 2023. This was the thirteenth term of Associate Justice Elena Kagan's tenure on the Court.
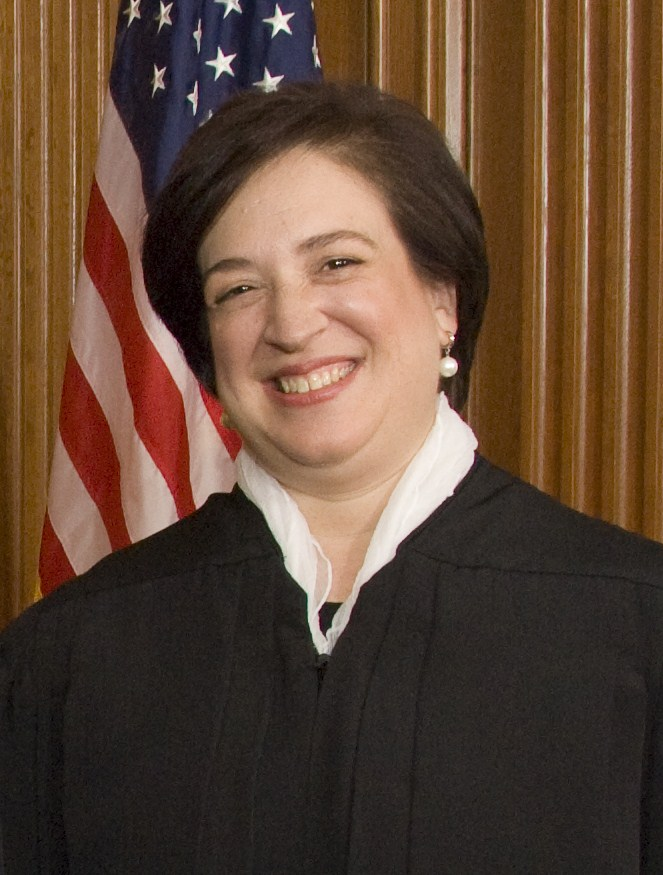

Elena Kagan 2022 term statistics

6	Majority or plurality	1	Concurrence	0	Other
4	Dissent	0	Concurrence/dissent	Total =	11
Bench opinions = 11		Opinions relating to orders = 0		In-chambers opinions = 0
Unanimous opinions: 1		Most joined by: Jackson (9)		Least joined by: Thomas, Gorsuch (3)

Type	Case	Citation	Issues	Joined by	Other opinions
	Helix Energy Solutions Group, Inc. v. Hewitt	598 U.S. ___ (2023)		Roberts, Thomas, Sotomayor, Barrett, Jackson	Gorsuch; Kavanuagh
	Axon Enterprise, Inc. v. Federal Trade Commission	598 U.S. ___ (2023)		Roberts, Thomas, Alito, Sotomayor, Kavanaugh, Barrett, Jackson	Thomas; Gorsuch
	Financial Oversight and Management Board for Puerto Rico v. Centro de Periodismo Investigativo, Inc.	598 U.S. ___ (2023)		Roberts, Alito, Sotomayor, Gorsuch, Kavanaugh, Barrett, Jackson	Thomas
	Andy Warhol Foundation for the Visual Arts, Inc. v. Goldsmith	598 U.S. ___ (2023)		Roberts	Sotomayor; Gorsuch
	Sackett v. EPA	598 U.S. ___ (2023)		Sotomayor, Jackson	Alito; Thomas; Kavanaugh
	Jack Daniel's Properties, Inc. v. VIP Products LLC	599 U.S. ___ (2023)		Unanimous	Sotomayor; Gorsuch
	United States ex rel. Polansky v. Executive Health Resources, Inc.	599 U.S. ___ (2023)		Roberts, Alito, Sotomayor, Gorsuch, Kavanaugh, Barrett, Jackson	Kavanaugh; Thomas
	Jones v. Hendrix	599 U.S. ___ (2023)			Thomas; Jackson
Signed jointly with Sotomayor.
	Samia v. United States	599 U.S. ___ (2023)		Sotomayor, Jackson	Thomas; Barrett; Jackson
	Counterman v. Colorado	600 U.S. ___ (2023)		Roberts, Alito, Kavanaugh, Jackson	Sotomayor; Thomas; Barrett
	Biden v. Nebraska	600 U.S. ___ (2023)		Sotomayor, Jackson	Roberts; Barrett
