= List of United States Supreme Court bankruptcy case law =

This is a list of Supreme Court of the United States cases in the area of bankruptcy.

This list is a list solely of United States Supreme Court decisions about applying law related to bankruptcy. Not all Supreme Court decisions are ultimately influential and, as in other fields, not all important decisions are made at the Supreme Court level. Many federal courts issue rulings that are significant or come to be influential, but those are outside the scope of this list.

== 20th Century ==
- Northern Pipeline Construction Co. v. Marathon Pipe Line Co., 458 U.S. 50 (1982)
- Granfinanciera, S.A. v. Nordberg, 492 U.S. 33 (1989)

== 21st Century ==
- Central Virginia Community College v. Katz, 546 U.S. 356 (2006)
- Stern v. Marshall, 564 U.S. 462 (2011)
- Exec. Benefits Ins. Agency v. Arkison, 573 U.S. 25 (2014)
- Wellness Int'l Network, Ltd. v. Sharif, 575 U.S. 665 (2015)
- Bank of America, N. A. v. Caulkett, 575 U.S. 790 (2015)
- Baker Botts L.L.P. v. ASARCO LLC, 576 U.S. 121 (2015)
- Czyzewski v. Jevic Holding Corp., No. 15-649, 580 U.S. ___ (2017)
- U.S. Bank N.A. v. Village at Lakeridge, LLC, No. 15-1509, 583 U.S. ___ (2018)
- Merit Management Group, LP v. FTI Consulting, Inc., No. 16-784, 583 U.S. ___ (2018)
- Lamar, Archer & Cofrin, LLP v. Appling, No. 16-1215, 584 U.S. ___ (2018)
- Mission Product Holdings, Inc. v. Tempnology, LLC, No. 17-1657, 587 U.S. ___ (2019)
- Taggart v. Lorenzen, No. 18-489, 587 U.S. ___ (2019)
- Ritzen Group, Inc. v. Jackson Masonry, LLC, No. 18-938, 589 U.S. ___ (2020)
- City of Chicago v. Fulton, No. 19-357, 592 U.S. ___ (2021)
- Siegel v. Fitzgerald, No. 21-441, 596 U.S. ___ (2022)
- MOAC Mall Holdings LLC v. Transform Holdco LLC, No. 21-1270, 598 U.S. ___ (2023)
- Bartenwerfer v. Buckley, No. 21-908, 598 U.S. ___ (2023)
- Lac du Flambeau Band of Lake Superior Chippewa Indians v. Coughlin, No. 22-227, 599 U.S. ___ (2023)
- Truck Insurance Exchange v. Kaiser Gypsum Co., No. 22-1079, 602 U.S. ___ (2024)
- Office of the United States Trustee v. John Q. Hammons Fall 2006, LLC, No. 22-1238, 602 U.S. ___ (2024)
- Harrington v. Purdue Pharma L.P., No. 23-124, 603 U.S. ___ (2024)
- United States v. Miller, No. 23-824, 604 U.S. ___ (2025)
