= 2022 term United States Supreme Court opinions of John Roberts =

The 2022 term of the Supreme Court of the United States began October 3, 2022, and concluded October 1, 2023. This was the eighteenth term of Chief Justice John Roberts's tenure on the Court.
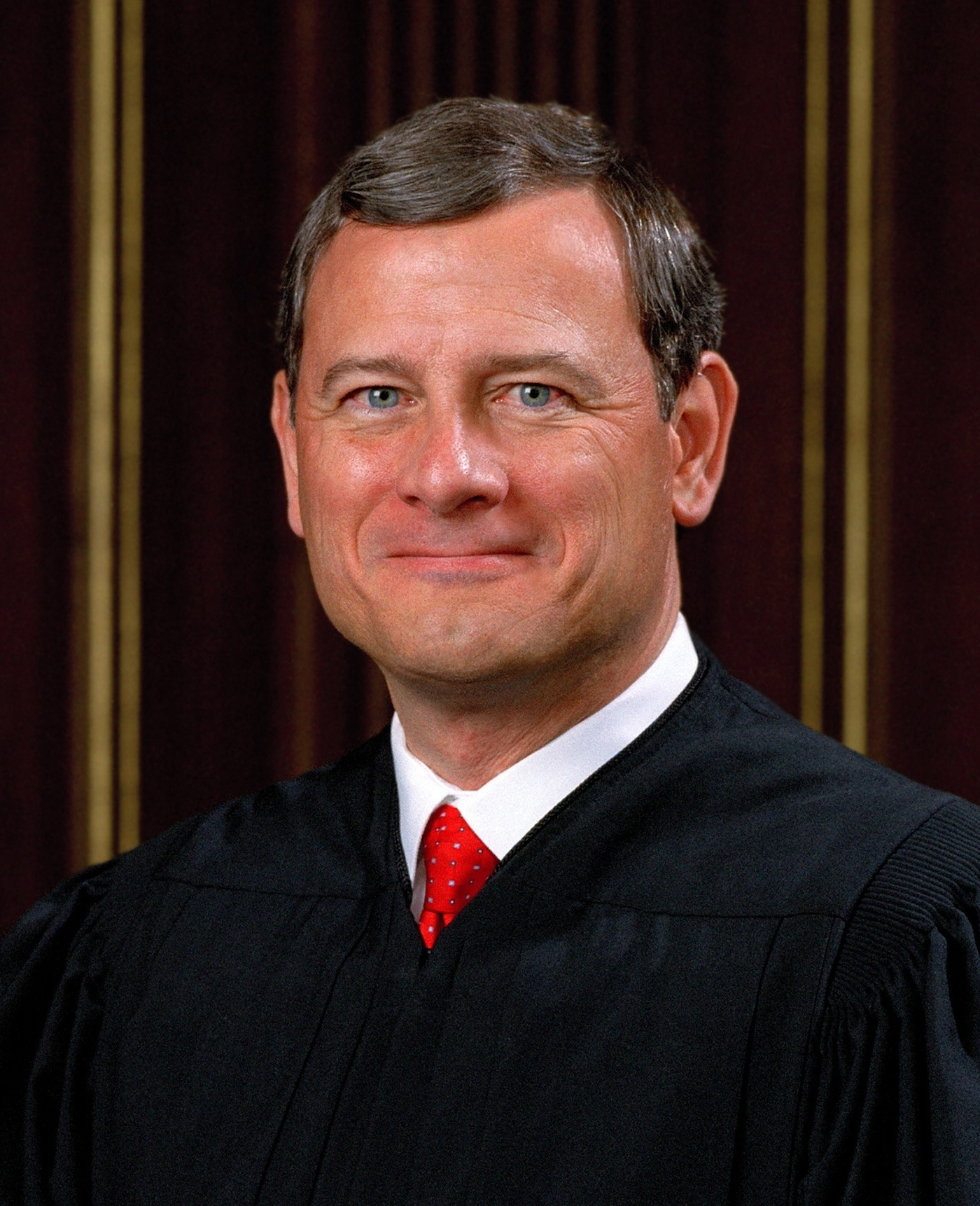

John Roberts 2022 term statistics

6	Majority or plurality	0	Concurrence	0	Other
0	Dissent	1	Concurrence/dissent	Total =	7
Bench opinions = 7		Opinions relating to orders = 0		In-chambers opinions = 0
Unanimous opinions: 2		Most joined by: Kavanaugh (6 in full, 1 in part)		Least joined by: Thomas, Sotomayor, Kagan, Gorsuch (4)

Type	Case	Citation	Issues	Joined by	Other opinions
	National Pork Producers Council v. Ross	598 U.S. ___ (2023)		Alito, Kavanaugh, Jackson	Gorsuch; Sotomayor; Barrett; Kavanaugh
	Polselli v. Internal Revenue Service	598 U.S. ___ (2023)		Unanimous	Jackson
	Tyler v. Hennepin County	598 U.S. ___ (2023)		Unanimous	Gorsuch
	Allen v. Milligan	599 U.S. ___ (2023)		Sotomayor, Kagan, Jackson; Kavanaugh (in part)	Kavanaugh; Thomas; Alito
	Moore v. Harper	600 U.S. ___ (2023)		Sotomayor, Kagan, Kavanaugh, Barrett, Jackson	Kavanaugh; Thomas
	Students for Fair Admissions, Inc. v. President and Fellows of Harvard College	600 U.S. ___ (2023)		Thomas, Alito, Gorsuch, Kavanaugh, Barrett	Thomas; Gorsuch; Kavanaugh; Sotomayor; Jackson
	Biden v. Nebraska	600 U.S. ___ (2023)		Thomas, Alito, Gorsuch, Kavanaugh, Barrett	Barrett; Kagan
