= Rogers v. Grimaldi =

American legal case

- Court: United States Court of Appeals for the Second Circuit
- Full case name: Ginger Rogers v. Alberto Grimaldi, et al
- Argued: December 22, 1988
- Decided: May 5, 1989
- Citations: 875 F.2d 994; 57 USLW 2692; 10 U.S.P.Q.2d 1825; 16 Media L. Rep. 1648

Case history
- Prior history: 695 F.Supp. 112 (S.D.N.Y. 1988)

Court membership
- Judges sitting: Jon O. Newman, Frank Altimari, Thomas P. Griesa (S.D.N.Y.)

Case opinions
- Majority: Newman, joined by Altimari
- Concurrence: Griesa

Laws applied
- Lanham Act

Rogers v. Grimaldi, 875 F.2d 994 (2d Cir. 1989) is a trademark and intellectual freedom case, known for establishing the "Rogers test" for protecting uses of trademarks that implicate intellectual freedom issues.

== Factual background ==
Actress Ginger Rogers sued Alberto Grimaldi and film company MGM for production and distribution of the 1986 Federico Fellini film Ginger and Fred, a film about Pippo and Amelia, two Italian cabaret performers whose routine emulated the more famous pairing of Fred Astaire and Ginger Rogers. Rogers claimed that the film violated her Lanham Act trademark rights, right of publicity, and was a "false light" defamation.

== Decision ==
The primary legal question in this case was whether the creator of an expressive work, which would be subject to First Amendment protection, could be liable under the Lanham Act (as well as state law) for using a celebrity's name as the title of the work. The Second Circuit, on appeal, noted:

This appeal presents a conflict between Rogers' right to protect her celebrated name and the right of others to express themselves freely in their own artistic work. Specifically, we must decide whether Rogers can prevent the use of the title Ginger and Fred for a fictional movie that only obliquely relates to Rogers and Astaire.

The lower court had previously found Grimaldi not liable, and had granted summary judgment to Grimaldi. The Second Circuit affirmed, with Judge Jon O. Newman writing for the panel that "suppressing an artistically relevant though ambiguous[ly] title[d] film" on trademark grounds would "unduly restrict expression." The court held that "In sum, we hold that section 43(a) of the Lanham Act does not bar a minimally relevant use of a celebrity's name in the title of an artistic work where the title does not explicitly denote authorship, sponsorship, or endorsement by the celebrity or explicitly mislead as to content."

Judge Thomas Griesa concurred in the judgment, but wrote separately to argue that the Second Circuit had not needed to establish a general rule, as the rule established was unlikely to suit future, more ambiguous cases.

== Impact ==
The "Rogers test", so-called, has since been cited by numerous courts, adopting its reasoning to protect the use of trademarks in works of creative expression. However, the Supreme Court limited the test's applicability in Jack Daniel's Properties, Inc. v. VIP Products LLC, holding unanimously that the test does not apply in cases where the alleged infringer uses the mark as a source designation for their own goods. Furthermore, a concurrence from Justice Gorsuch criticized the Rogers test for having an unclear legal basis. Some commentators have argued that Jack Daniel's could mean the end of the Rogers test, though the case did not actually overturn Rogers.
