= List of United States Supreme Court cases, volume 599 =

This is a list of all the United States Supreme Court cases from volume 599 of the United States Reports:

Note: As of July 2025, final bound volumes for the U.S. Supreme Court's United States Reports have been published through volume 582 (June 2017). Newer cases from subsequent future volumes do not yet have official page numbers and typically use three underscores in place of the page number; e.g., Example v. United States, 700 U.S. ___ (2050).

Case name	Docket no.	Date decided
Allen v. Milligan	21–1086	June 8, 2023
Plaintiffs demonstrated a reasonable likelihood of success on their claim that Alabama's redistricting plan violates Section 2 of the Voting Rights Act of 1965.
Dubin v. United States	22–10	June 8, 2023
Under §1028A(a)(1), a defendant “uses” another person’s means of identification “in relation to” a predicate offense when the use is at the crux of what makes the conduct criminal.
Jack Daniel's Properties, Inc. v. VIP Products LLC	22–148	June 8, 2023
When an alleged infringer uses a trademark as a designation of source for the infringer's own goods, the Rogers test does not apply.
Health and Hospital Corporation of Marion County v. Talevski	21–806	June 8, 2023
The provisions of the Federal Nursing Home Reform Act at issue unambiguously create rights enforceable under 42 U.S.C. §1983, and private enforcement under §1983 is compatible with the FNHRA’s remedial scheme. A plaintiff can file a federal civil rights claim because of violation of the Federal Nursing Home Reform Act.
Smith v. United States	21–1576	June 15, 2023
The Constitution permits the retrial of a defendant following a trial in an improper venue conducted before a jury drawn from the wrong district.
Haaland v. Brackeen	21–376	June 15, 2023
1. The Court declines to disturb the Fifth Circuit’s conclusion that ICWA is consistent with Congress’s Article I authority.; 2. Petitioners’ anticommandeering challenges, which address three categories of ICWA provisions, are rejected. 3. The Court does not reach the merits of petitioners’ two additional claims—an equal protection challenge to ICWA’s placement preferences and a nondelegation challenge to §1915(c), the provision allowing tribes to alter the placement preferences—because no party before the Court has standing to raise them.
Lac du Flambeau Band of Lake Superior Chippewa Indians v. Coughlin	22–227	June 15, 2023
Native American Nations are not immune from the automatic stay of the Bankruptcy Code
United States ex rel. Polansky v. Executive Health Resources, Inc.	21–1052	June 16, 2023
In a qui tam action filed under the False Claims Act, the United States may move to dismiss whenever it has intervened — whether during the seal period or later on.
Lora v. United States	22–49	June 16, 2023
Section 924(c)(1)(D)(ii)’s bar on concurrent sentences does not govern a sentence for a §924(j) conviction. A §924(j) sentence therefore can run either concurrently with or consecutively to another sentence.
Jones v. Hendrix	21–857	June 22, 2023
Section 2255(e) does not allow a prisoner asserting an intervening change in interpretation of a criminal statute to circumvent the Antiterrorism and Effective Death Penalty Act of 1996’s (AEDPA) restrictions on second or successive §2255 motions by filing a §2241 habeas petition
Yegiazaryan v. Smagin	22–381	June 22, 2023
A plaintiff alleges a domestic injury for purposes of §1964(c) when the circumstances surrounding the injury indicate it arose in the United States.
Pugin v. Garland	22–23	June 22, 2023
An offense may "relate to" obstruction of justice under the Immigration and Nationality Act even if the offense does not require that an investigation or proceeding be pending.
Arizona v. Navajo Nation	21–1484	June 22, 2023
The 1868 treaty establishing the Navajo Reservation reserved necessary water to accomplish the purpose of the Navajo Reservation but did not require the United States to take affirmative steps to secure water for the Tribe.
Samia v. United States	22–196	June 23, 2023
The Confrontation Clause was not violated by the admission of a non-testifying codefendant’s confession that did not directly inculpate the defendant and was subject to a proper limiting instruction.
United States v. Texas	22–58	June 23, 2023
Texas and Louisiana lack Article III standing to challenge the Guidelines.
Coinbase, Inc. v. Bielski	22–105	June 23, 2023
A federal district court must stay its proceedings while an interlocutory appeal on the question of arbitrability is ongoing.
United States v. Hansen	22–179	June 23, 2023
Because §1324(a)(1)(A)(iv) forbids only the purposeful solicitation and facilitation of specific acts known to violate federal law, the clause is not unconstitutionally overbroad.

== See also ==
- List of United States Supreme Court cases by the Roberts Court
- 2022 term opinions of the Supreme Court of the United States
