= Polselli v. Internal Revenue Service =

- Supreme Court of the United States

Decided May 18, 2023
- Full case name: Polselli v. Internal Revenue Service
- Docket no.: 21-1599
- Citations: 598 U.S. 432 (more)

Holding
- When the Internal Revenue Service issues a summons in aid of collecting a tax liability, the exception to the notice requirement in 26 U.S.C. § 7609(c)(2)(D)(i) applies even if the delinquent taxpayer has no legal interest in the accounts or records summoned.

Court membership
- Chief Justice John Roberts Associate Justices Clarence Thomas · Samuel Alito; Sonia Sotomayor · Elena Kagan; Neil Gorsuch · Brett Kavanaugh; Amy Coney Barrett · Ketanji Brown Jackson

Case opinions
- Majority: Roberts, joined by unanimous
- Concurrence: Jackson, joined by Gorsuch

Polselli v. Internal Revenue Service, 598 U.S. 432 (2023), was a United States Supreme Court case in which the Court held that when the Internal Revenue Service issues a summons in aid of collecting a tax liability, the exception to the notice requirement in 26 U.S.C. § 7609(c)(2)(D)(i) applies even if the delinquent taxpayer has no legal interest in the accounts or records summoned.
