= Percoco v. United States =

- Supreme Court of the United States

Argued November 28, 2022 Decided May 11, 2023
- Full case name: Joseph Percoco, Petitioner v. United States, et al.
- Docket no.: 21-1158
- Citations: 598 U.S. 319 (more)
- Argument: Oral argument
- Opinion announcement: Opinion announcement

Case history
- Prior: Defendants convicted. United States v. Percoco, No. 16-cr-776 (S.D.N.Y. 2018).; Judgment affirmed. 13 F.4th 180 (2d Cir. 2021).; Cert granted. 597 U.S. ___ (2022).

Questions presented
- Does a private citizen who holds no elected office or government employment, but has informal political or other influence over governmental decisionmaking, owe a fiduciary duty to the general public such that he can be convicted of honest-services fraud?

Holding
- Instructing the jury based on the Second Circuit's 1982 decision in Margiotta on the legal standard for finding that a private citizen owes the government a duty of honest services was error.

Court membership
- Chief Justice John Roberts Associate Justices Clarence Thomas · Samuel Alito; Sonia Sotomayor · Elena Kagan; Neil Gorsuch · Brett Kavanaugh; Amy Coney Barrett · Ketanji Brown Jackson

Case opinions
- Majority: Alito, joined by Roberts, Sotomayor, Kagan, Kavanaugh, Barrett; Jackson (all but Part II-C-2)
- Concurrence: Gorsuch (in judgment), joined by Thomas

Percoco v. United States, 598 U.S. 319 (2023), was a United States Supreme Court case regarding the federal honest services fraud statute. In the case, the Court held that a private citizen with significant influence over government decision-making cannot be convicted of honest services fraud for actions taken while not holding public office.

== Background ==
Joseph Percoco, a close aide to New York Governor Andrew Cuomo, served as the Governor's Executive Deputy Secretary from 2011 to 2016, except for an eight-month period in 2014 when he resigned to manage Cuomo's reelection campaign. During this hiatus, Percoco retained significant influence over state government operations despite not holding an official position.

During this time, a real estate developer, Steven Aiello, sought assistance with a requirement imposed by Empire State Development (ESD), a state agency, which mandated that Aiello's company sign a "Labor Peace Agreement" with local unions to receive state funding for a lucrative project. Aiello, through an intermediary, approached Percoco for help. In exchange for two payments totaling $35,000, Percoco contacted a senior ESD official to have the labor agreement requirement removed. The following day, ESD reversed its position and informed Aiello that the agreement was no longer necessary.

In the District Court, Joseph Percoco was charged with multiple offenses, including conspiracy to commit honest-services wire fraud. Before trial, Percoco filed a motion to dismiss the charges, arguing that as a private citizen during his hiatus from public office, he could not owe a fiduciary duty to the public. The court denied this motion, allowing the prosecution to proceed with its theory that Percoco retained influence over state government sufficient to create such a duty.

At trial, the prosecution presented evidence that Percoco had received $35,000 from Aiello in exchange for intervening with ESD. The court instructed the jury that they could find Percoco guilty if they determined that he "dominated and controlled" government business and that state officials relied on him due to a "special relationship." Over defense objections to these instructions, the jury convicted Percoco on one count of conspiracy to commit honest-services wire fraud. The court subsequently sentenced him to 72 months' imprisonment.

In the Second Circuit, Joseph Percoco appealed his conviction for conspiracy to commit honest-services wire fraud, arguing that as a private citizen during the relevant period, he could not owe a fiduciary duty to the public. The court rejected this argument and upheld the conviction, relying on its precedent from United States v. Margiotta, which held that private individuals could owe such a duty if they exerted substantial influence over government decision-making. The Second Circuit determined that the District Court's jury instructions, which required proof that Percoco "dominated and controlled" government business and that officials relied on him due to a "special relationship," were consistent with Margiotta and adequately supported by the evidence presented at trial.

== Supreme Court ==
The Supreme Court's analysis in Percoco v. United States centered on whether the jury instructions in the District Court accurately defined the conditions under which a private citizen could owe a fiduciary duty to the public for purposes of honest-services fraud under 18 U.S.C. § 1346. The Court evaluated the Second Circuit's reliance on United States v. Margiotta (1982), which held that a private individual could owe such a duty if they exerted substantial influence over governmental decision-making and were relied upon by public officials due to a special relationship. The Court concluded that this standard was unconstitutionally vague, as it failed to provide sufficient clarity to define prohibited conduct or to prevent arbitrary enforcement.

In reaching its decision, the Court emphasized the need to interpret § 1346 narrowly to avoid due process concerns. Drawing upon its prior decision in Skilling v. United States (2010), the Court reaffirmed that the statute applies to bribery and kickback schemes involving a clear and established fiduciary duty but does not extend to ill-defined categories of influence over government actions. The Court criticized the Margiotta standard for lacking precision, as it could potentially criminalize lawful and constitutionally protected activities such as lobbying or providing political advice.

The Court also considered the government's alternative arguments for affirming the conviction, including the theory that Percoco owed a duty because he was selected to return to public office and because he exercised government functions with the acquiescence of officials. The Court rejected these arguments as inconsistent with the jury instructions and the basis of the Second Circuit's decision. It noted that these alternative theories were not presented to the jury and did not form the foundation of the lower court's analysis.

Ultimately, the Supreme Court held that the jury instructions were erroneous because they failed to define the intangible right of honest services with sufficient specificity, violating constitutional requirements for criminal statutes. The Court reversed the Second Circuit's decision and remanded the case, underscoring the principle that criminal statutes must provide clear notice of the conduct they prohibit to ensure fairness and prevent arbitrary application.

== See also ==
- Ciminelli v. United States
