= Ian Millhiser =

American legal journalist

Ian Millhiser is an American legal journalist and senior correspondent for Vox. He previously wrote for ThinkProgress as a columnist and worked as a senior constitutional policy analyst at the Center for American Progress. Millhiser writes articles about the Supreme Court, and has criticized many of its decisions.

== Biography ==
Millhiser received his B.A. in philosophy from Kenyon College in 2000 and his J.D. magna cum laude from Duke University School of Law in 2006, where he was a member of the Order of the Coif and the senior note editor for the Duke Law Journal. He subsequently clerked for Judge Eric L. Clay of the United States Court of Appeals for the Sixth Circuit and served as a Teach For America corps member in the Mississippi Delta. He has also worked as an attorney at the National Senior Citizens Law Center’s Federal Rights Project and as assistant director for communications at the American Constitution Society.

Millhiser is the author of two books about the Supreme Court of the United States: Injustices: The Supreme Court's History of Comforting the Comfortable and Afflicting the Afflicted (2015) and The Agenda: How a Republican Supreme Court Is Reshaping America (2021). Reviews of The Agenda were published in the Guardian and the Washington Post.
