= Santos-Zacaria v. Garland =

- Supreme Court of the United States

Decided May 11, 2023
- Full case name: Santos-Zacaria v. Garland
- Docket no.: 21-1436
- Citations: 598 U.S. 411 (more)

Holding
- The requirement that a noncitizen facing a removal order must exhaust all administrative remedies before seeking judicial review of the removal order is not jurisdictional.

Court membership
- Chief Justice John Roberts Associate Justices Clarence Thomas · Samuel Alito; Sonia Sotomayor · Elena Kagan; Neil Gorsuch · Brett Kavanaugh; Amy Coney Barrett · Ketanji Brown Jackson

Case opinions
- Majority: Jackson, joined by unanimous
- Concurrence: Alito (in judgment), joined by Thomas

Santos-Zacaria v. Garland, 598 U.S. 411 (2023), was a United States Supreme Court case in which the court held that noncitizens (Note: The court used the term "noncitizen" instead of the statutory term "alien." These terms can be used interchangeably.) are not required to exhaust all possible discretionary appeals offered by the Board of Immigration Appeals (BIA) before contesting removal orders in federal courts. Instead, 8 U.S.C. § 1252(d)(1) requires only that they exhaust mandatory, non-discretionary administrative remedies—those they are entitled to by law.

== Background ==
Leon Santos-Zaccharia is a non-citizen. She fled Guatemala as a teenager, and has testified that she left the country after receiving death threats for being a transgender woman. She was removed from the United States by immigration authorities in 2008, and was detained in 2018 after re-entry. She applied for withholding of removal based on persecution but was denied.

The Fifth Circuit Court of Appeals declined jurisdiction under 8 U.S.C. § 1251 requiring exhaustion of "all administrative remedies available to the alien as of right", holding that the exhaustion requirement was jurisdictional.

The Supreme Court granted certiorari to resolve circuit conflicts around two questions:

1. whether § 1252(d)(1)'s exhaustion requirement is jurisdictional
2. whether § 1252(d)(1) requires seeking discretionary administrative review, like reconsideration by the Board of Immigration Appeals

== Opinion of the Court ==
Writing for the Court, Ketanji Brown Jackson held that the exhaustion requirement is not jurisdictional. According to the clear statement principle a rule is jurisdictional "only when Congress unmistakably has so instructed". The Court found no express language in the statute to that effect.

On the second question, the Court held that § 1252(d)(1) did not require exhaustion of discretionary forms of review. The statute only requires non-citizens to exhaust all administrative remedies available "as of right". The Court concluded that a discretionary agency process that is not available "as of right", like the Board of Immigration Appeals reconsideration process, is not required by § 1252(d)(1).

== Reactions ==
The case was widely considered low-profile and uncontroversial, although it received some attention because of Justice Jackson's decision to use the term "noncitizen" in place of "alien" and honor the petitioner's preferred name and pronouns. While LGBTQ+ and immigrant rights groups expressed support for Jackson's phrasing, conservative sources argued that "noncitizen" was legally inaccuate and admonished the Court's majority for signing onto the decision.
