= Wilkins v. United States =

- Supreme Court of the United States

Argued November 30, 2022 Decided March 28, 2023
- Full case name: Wilkins v. United States
- Docket no.: 21-1164
- Citations: 598 U.S. 152 (more)
- Argument: Oral argument

Case history
- Prior: United States Court of Appeals for the Ninth Circuit

Questions presented
- Is the Quiet Title Act's Statute of Limitations a jurisdictional requirement or a claim-processing rule?

Holding
- The 12-year statute of limitations in section 2409a(g) of the Quiet Title Act is a non-jurisdictional claims-processing rule.

Court membership
- Chief Justice John Roberts Associate Justices Clarence Thomas · Samuel Alito; Sonia Sotomayor · Elena Kagan; Neil Gorsuch · Brett Kavanaugh; Amy Coney Barrett · Ketanji Brown Jackson

Case opinions
- Majority: Sotomayor, joined by Kagan, Gorsuch, Kavanaugh, Barrett, Jackson
- Dissent: Thomas, joined by Roberts, Alito

Laws applied
- Quiet Title Act, 28 U.S.C. § 2409a

Wilkins v. United States, 598 U.S. 152 (2023), is a United States Supreme Court case that revolves around the dispute over the public use of Robbins Gulch Road, which serves as an access point to the Bitterroot National Forest in western Montana. The issue stems from the government's decision to allow public access to the road, resulting in disturbances and adverse effects on the adjacent private properties owned by Wilkins and other residents in the area.

Initially, the government had been granted an easement to facilitate access for government agents and contractors involved in timber harvesting. However, in 2006, the government extended an invitation to the general public to use the easement, leading to disruptions and incidents of vandalism, trespassing, and property theft, which significantly impacted the tranquility of the property owners in the area.

The petitioners argued that the scope of the easement exceeded the terms agreed upon previously and sought legal recourse through litigation. The district court dismissed the complaint, citing a lack of subject matter jurisdiction due to the failure to file the claim before the expiration of the twelve-year statute of limitations under the Quiet Title Act. The 9th Circuit Court of Appeals upheld this decision, which was later overturned by the U.S. Supreme Court. The Supreme Court reversed and remanded the ruling, holding that the 12-year statute of limitations in section 2409a(g) of the Quiet Title Act is a” non-jurisdictional claims-processing rule”.

== Background ==
The petitioners Larry (Wil) Wilkins and Jane Stanton lived along Robbins Gulch Road, a one-mile-long dirt road in western Montana, situated in the northern Rocky Mountains. This road served as an access point linking a public highway to an entryway into the Bitterroot National Forest, a 1.6-million-acre expanse that permits timber harvesting and enables public recreational activities, such as hunting, fishing, camping, and hiking along an extensive network of 1,600 miles of trails. Wilkins, a military veteran and nature enthusiast, acquired his property adjacent to the forest in 2004, captivated by the area's ambiance.

Approximately six decades ago, the previous landowners of the land on which Wilkins and Stanton currently reside granted the federal government an easement across their property to facilitate access for government agents and contractors, primarily those involved in timber harvesting, between the forest and the highway. The documentation regarding the government's acquisition of the easement explicitly specifies that the road was to be "...improved, used, operated, patrolled, and maintained as the Robbins Gulch Road, Project Number 446." Furthermore, an accompanying letter outlined the "...purpose of the road..." as being used primarily for "...timber harvest." For numerous years, until 2006, Wilkins and Stanton attested that the government adhered to the terms stipulated in the deeds and the magnitude of its easement, and its use of the road did not encroach on their property.

In 2006, the government placed a sign along the road stating "PUBLIC ACCESS THRU PRIVATE LANDS," essentially inviting the general public to use the government's easement for easier access to the national forest. As a result, increased vehicular activity led to disruptive noise, vandalism, trespassing, property theft, and soil erosion due to the unpaved road. One incident involved a hunter using the road who shot Wilkins' cat, and another driver intentionally ran over two of his neighbor's dogs. This led several of Wilkins' neighbors to leave due to the loss of peace and tranquility on their properties.

Despite Wilkins' persistent requests for the Forest Service to address the issues stemming from public use of the road, the Forest Service maintained that its easement empowered the government to grant public access to the road. Subsequently, Wilkins sought legal recourse under the Quiet Title Act, 28 U.S.C. § 2409a, asserting that the government had exceeded the scope of the easement by allowing public use of the road. The district court dismissed the complaint for lack of subject matter jurisdiction, citing the failure to file the claim within the Act's twelve-year statute of limitations. The Ninth Circuit upheld the dismissal, prompting Wilkins to appeal to the Supreme Court.

== Arguments of the petitioner ==
The petitioners contended that the Act's statute-of-limitations provision does not present a jurisdictional barrier preventing them from pursuing their claim against the government, but instead constitutes a "claim-processing rule" necessitating the moving party to demonstrate the statute of limitations and calling for the court to evaluate conflicting claims concerning the purported waiver of the statute of limitations.

== Arguments of the respondent ==
The government's position is that the claim should be dismissed due to the lack of subject matter jurisdiction, asserting that the claims are time-barred. This assertion is based on the failure to file the claim within the Act's twelve-year statute of limitations.

== Holding ==
In a 6–3 decision authored by Justice Sotomayor, the Supreme Court ruled that the 12-year time limit for an action under the Quiet Title Act is not jurisdictional. The Court emphasized the difference between restrictions on the types of cases a court can hear, known as subject-matter jurisdiction, and "nonjurisdictional claim-processing rules" designed to ensure the orderly progress of litigation by requiring parties to follow specific procedural steps at designated times. The Court ultimately found the Government's argument about legislative acquiescence to be unpersuasive, determining that Section 2409a(g) represents a “nonjurisdictional claims-processing rule”. This means that although the time limit rule is mandatory, it does not affect the court's jurisdiction and that the case can still be heard if the statute of limitations is waived or tolled. By ruling that the time limit is not jurisdictional, the Court left open the possibility that procedural defenses such as the doctrines of waiver or estoppel could allow a court to hear a case even if it was filed late. As a result, the Court overturned the previous judgment of the Court of Appeals and remanded the case for further proceedings consistent with the Court's opinion.

== See also ==
- Pacific Legal Foundation
