= Financial Oversight and Management Board for Puerto Rico v. Centro de Periodismo Investigativo, Inc. =

- Supreme Court of the United States

Decided May 11, 2023
- Full case name: Financial Oversight and Management Board for Puerto Rico v. Centro de Periodismo Investigativo, Inc.
- Docket no.: 22-96
- Citations: 598 U.S. 339 (more)

Holding
- Nothing in the Puerto Rico Oversight, Management, and Economic Stability Act categorically nullified any sovereign immunity the Board enjoys from legal claims.

Court membership
- Chief Justice John Roberts Associate Justices Clarence Thomas · Samuel Alito; Sonia Sotomayor · Elena Kagan; Neil Gorsuch · Brett Kavanaugh; Amy Coney Barrett · Ketanji Brown Jackson

Case opinions
- Majority: Kagan, joined by Roberts, Alito, Sotomayor, Gorsuch, Kavanaugh, Barrett, and Jackson
- Dissent: Thomas

Laws applied
- Puerto Rico Oversight, Management, and Economic Stability Act

Financial Oversight and Management Board for Puerto Rico v. Centro de Periodismo Investigativo, Inc., 598 U.S. 339 (2023), was a United States Supreme Court case in which the Court held that nothing in the Puerto Rico Oversight, Management, and Economic Stability Act categorically nullified any sovereign immunity the Board enjoyed from legal claims. The Court assumed without deciding that Puerto Rico was immune from suit in a United States district court, and that the Board had access to that immunity.
