= Bittner v. United States =

- Supreme Court of the United States

Argued November 2, 2022 Decided February 28, 2023
- Full case name: Bittner v. United States
- Docket no.: 21-1195
- Citations: 598 U.S. 85 (more)

Holding
- The penalty for non-willful failure to report a bank account under the Bank Secrecy Act applies once per failed report, not once per account.

Court membership
- Chief Justice John Roberts Associate Justices Clarence Thomas · Samuel Alito; Sonia Sotomayor · Elena Kagan; Neil Gorsuch · Brett Kavanaugh; Amy Coney Barrett · Ketanji Brown Jackson

Case opinions
- Majority: Gorsuch, joined by Jackson; Roberts, Alito, Kavanaugh (except part II-C)
- Dissent: Barrett, joined by Thomas, Sotomayor, Kagan

Bittner v. United States, 598 U.S. 85 (2023), was a United States Supreme Court case related to the penalty for multiple failures to report a foreign bank account. After the fall of communism in Romania, Alexandru Bittner, a naturalized American citizen, returned to his native country and became a businessman, but failed to report his foreign bank accounts to the Internal Revenue Service (IRS), as required by the Bank Secrecy Act. He later filed corrected reports for 2007-2011. Under statutory law, the government is authorized to fine a maximum penalty of $10,000 for non-willful failure to report a foreign bank account. Because the number of accounts over 5 years totaled 272, the government sought to fine Mr. Bittner $2.72 million. The case was notable for the resulting "strange lineup of justices" which did not split along traditional ideological lines.
