= United States ex rel. Polansky v. Executive Health Resources, Inc. =

- Supreme Court of the United States

Argued December 6, 2022 Decided June 16, 2023
- Full case name: United States ex rel. Polansky v. Executive Health Resources, Inc.
- Docket no.: 21-1052
- Citations: 599 U.S. 419 (more)

Holding
- In a qui tam action filed under the False Claims Act, the United States may move to dismiss whenever it has intervened — whether during the seal period or later on.

Court membership
- Chief Justice John Roberts Associate Justices Clarence Thomas · Samuel Alito; Sonia Sotomayor · Elena Kagan; Neil Gorsuch · Brett Kavanaugh; Amy Coney Barrett · Ketanji Brown Jackson

Case opinions
- Majority: Kagan, joined by Roberts, Alito, Sotomayor, Gorsuch, Kavanaugh, Barrett, and Jackson
- Concurrence: Kavanaugh, joined by Barrett
- Dissent: Thomas

Laws applied
- False Claims Act

United States ex rel. Polansky v. Executive Health Resources, Inc., 599 U.S. 419 (2023), was a United States Supreme Court case in which the Court held that in a qui tam action filed under the False Claims Act, the United States may move to dismiss whenever it has intervened – whether during the seal period or later on. In assessing a motion to dismiss an FCA action over a relator's objection, district courts should apply Federal Rule of Civil Procedure 41(a), the rule generally governing voluntary dismissal of suits in ordinary civil litigation.
