= United States v. Texas (2023) =

- Supreme Court of the United States

Argued November 29, 2022 Decided June 23, 2023
- Full case name: United States, et al. v. Texas, et al.
- Docket no.: 22-58
- Citations: 599 U.S. 670 (more) 143 S. Ct. 1964
- Argument: Oral argument
- Opinion announcement: Opinion announcement

Questions presented
- (1) Whether the state plaintiffs have Article III standing to challenge the Department of Homeland Security's Guidelines for the Enforcement of Civil Immigration Law; and (2) Whether the Guidelines are contrary to 8 U.S.C. § 1226(c) or 8 U.S.C. § 1231(a), or otherwise violate the Administrative Procedure Act; and (3) Whether 8 U.S.C. § 1252(f)(1) prevents the entry of an order to "hold unlawful and set aside" the Guidelines under 5 U.S.C. § 706(2).

Holding
- Texas and Louisiana lack Article III standing to challenge the Guidelines.

Court membership
- Chief Justice John Roberts Associate Justices Clarence Thomas · Samuel Alito; Sonia Sotomayor · Elena Kagan; Neil Gorsuch · Brett Kavanaugh; Amy Coney Barrett · Ketanji Brown Jackson

Case opinions
- Majority: Kavanaugh, joined by Roberts, Sotomayor, Kagan, Jackson
- Concurrence: Gorsuch (in judgment), joined by Thomas, Barrett
- Concurrence: Barrett (in judgment), joined by Gorsuch
- Dissent: Alito

Laws applied
- U.S. Const. art. III

United States v. Texas, 599 U.S. 670 (2023), is a United States Supreme Court case in which the Court held that Texas and Louisiana did not have Article III standing to challenge a Biden administration policy prioritizing "the apprehension and deportation of three specific groups of people: suspected terrorists, non-citizens who have committed crimes, and those caught recently at the border." In 2025, President Trump signed the Laken Riley Act which "authorizes state governments to sue for injunctive relief over certain immigration-related decisions or alleged failures by the federal government if the decision or failure caused the state or its residents harm, including financial harm of more than $100".

== Background ==
Many of the Biden administration's immigration policies have been subject to protracted litigation. Shortly after taking office in January 2021, the administration directed the U.S. immigration agency, ICE, to stop all deportations except those that posed a threat to "national security, public safety, and border security". The act was widely expected to reduce the number of deportations by the agency. Texas filed a lawsuit in the United States District Court for the Southern District of Texas soon after, and Judge Drew B. Tipton issued a temporary restraining order. The state soon dismissed the lawsuit, but filed a new suit with Louisiana in April 2021 after the administration issued modified interim guidance in February. Judge Tipton then issued a preliminary injunction in August 2021. The government appealed to the United States Court of Appeals for the Fifth Circuit, which stayed the injunction in part in September. In November, the 5th Circuit, sitting en banc, vacated the panel opinion. That appeal became moot as the administration had issued a final guidance document in September.

The court held a bench trial in February 2022 about the legality of the final guidance. On June 10, 2022, the court held the final guidance violated the Administrative Procedure Act, and vacated it. On July 6, 2022, a panel of the Fifth Circuit denied a stay pending appeal, holding the Supreme Court's intervening decision in Garland v. Gonzalez did not deprive the district court of jurisdiction over the suit.

Arizona, Montana, and Ohio separately challenged the permanent guidance in the United States District Court for the Southern District of Ohio. On March 22, 2022, Judge Michael J. Newman issued a preliminary injunction against the guidance, which the United States Court of Appeals for the Sixth Circuit stayed on April 12, 2022, and reversed on July 5, 2022.

== Supreme Court ==
After the 5th Circuit denied a stay pending appeal, the federal government sought a stay from the Supreme Court on July 8, 2022. On July 21, 2022, the Court denied the application for stay in a 5–4 vote, but granted certiorari before judgment and set the case for argument in the December sitting. Oral arguments were held on November 29, 2022. On June 23, 2023, the Supreme Court reversed the district court in an 8–1 decision.

The decision was described by Ian Millhiser as a "serious blow to Republican efforts to control federal immigration policy by seeking injunctions from sympathetic judges".

=== Majority opinion ===
Kavanaugh wrote:

Under Article II, the Executive Branch possesses authority to decide “how to prioritize and how aggressively to pursue legal actions against defendants who violate the law." The States’ novel standing argument, if accepted, would entail expansive judicial direction of the Department’s arrest policies. If the Court green-lighted this suit, we could anticipate complaints in future years about alleged Executive Branch under-enforcement of any similarly worded laws—whether they be drug laws, gun laws, obstruction of justice laws, or the like. (...) Our constitutional system of separation of powers "contemplates a more restricted role for Article III courts." (...) In holding that Texas and Louisiana lack standing, we do not suggest that federal courts may never entertain cases involving the Executive Branch’s alleged failure to make more arrests or bring more prosecutions. (...) in our system of dual federal and state sovereignty, federal policies frequently generate indirect effects on state revenues or state spending. And when a State asserts, for example, that a federal law has produced only those kinds of indirect effects, the State’s claim for standing can become more attenuated.

Kavanaugh’s opinion relied on Linda R. S. v. Richard D., which held that a private citizen generally has no judicially cognizable interest in the prosecution of another person and therefore lacks standing to challenge a prosecutor's enforcement decisions when the citizen is neither prosecuted nor threatened with prosecution. The Court further noted that the absence of supporting precedent or historical practice weighed heavily against recognizing standing for the States' lawsuit.

The Court explained that the Executive Branch must make arrest and prosecution decisions in light of limited resources and changing public-safety and public-welfare priorities, requiring it to balance numerous competing considerations. Because courts lack meaningful standards for evaluating those policy judgments, they are generally not the proper forum for claims that the Executive Branch should undertake more enforcement actions. Accordingly, the Court reiterated its longstanding view that decisions not to arrest, prosecute, or otherwise enforce the law are ordinarily unsuitable for judicial review.

=== Alito dissent ===
Alito wrote:

If States are also barred from bringing suit even when they satisfy our established test for Article III standing, they are powerless to defend their vital interests. If a President fails or refuses to enforce the immigration laws, the States must simply bear the consequences. That interpretation of executive authority and Article III’s case or controversy requirement is deeply and dangerously flawed. (...) shall means shall; it does not mean “may.” (...) [M]any of the costs in this case are not indirect. When the Federal Government refuses or fails to comply with §§1226(a) and (c) as to criminal aliens, the direct result in many cases is that the State must continue its supervision. As noted, the District Court made specific findings about the financial cost that Texas incurred as a result of DHS’s failure to assume custody of aliens covered by §§1226(a) and (c). And the costs that a State must bear when it is required to assume the supervision of criminal aliens who should be kept in federal custody are not only financial. Criminal aliens whom DHS unlawfully refuses to detain may be placed on state probation, parole, or supervised release, and some will commit new crimes and end up in a state jail or prison. Probation, parole, and corrections officers are engaged in dangerous work that can put their lives on the line. (...) In Massachusetts v. EPA, the Court suggested that allowing Massachusetts to protect its sovereign interests through litigation compensated for its inability to protect those interests by the means that would have been available had it not entered the Union. In the present case, Texas’s entry into the Union stripped it of the power that it undoubtedly enjoyed as a sovereign nation to police its borders and regulate the entry of aliens. The Constitution and federal immigration laws have taken away most of that power, but the statutory provisions at issue in this case afford the State at least some protection—in particular by preventing the State and its residents from bearing the costs, financial and non-financial, inflicted by the release of certain dangerous criminal aliens. Our law on standing should not deprive the State of even that modest protection. We should not treat Texas less favorably than Massachusetts. And even if we do not view Texas’s standing argument with any “special solicitude,” we should at least refrain from treating it with special hostility by failing to apply our standard test for Article III standing.
