= Bartenwerfer v. Buckley =

- Supreme Court of the United States

Argued December 6, 2022 Decided February 22, 2023
- Full case name: Kate Marie Bartenwerfer v. Kieran Buckley
- Docket no.: 21-908
- Citations: 598 U.S. 69 (more)
- Argument: Oral argument
- Opinion announcement: Opinion announcement
- Decision: Opinion

Case history
- Prior: Bartenwerfer v. Buckley, 860 Fed. App’x. 544 (9th Cir. 2021)

Questions presented
- Whether an individual may be subject to liability for the fraud of another that is barred from discharge in bankruptcy under 11 U.S.C. § 523(a)(2)(A), by imputation, without any act, omission, intent or knowledge of her own.

Holding
- Section 523(a)(2)(A) precludes someone from discharging in bankruptcy a debt obtained by fraud, regardless of their own culpability.

Court membership
- Chief Justice John Roberts Associate Justices Clarence Thomas · Samuel Alito; Sonia Sotomayor · Elena Kagan; Neil Gorsuch · Brett Kavanaugh; Amy Coney Barrett · Ketanji Brown Jackson

Case opinions
- Majority: Barrett, joined by unanimous
- Concurrence: Sotomayor, joined by Jackson

Laws applied
- United States Bankruptcy Code

Bartenwerfer v. Buckley, 598 U.S. 69 (2023), is a United States Supreme Court case in which the court held that debts incurred by fraud cannot be discharged in bankruptcy, regardless of whether the debtor committed the fraud.

== Background ==
In 2012, the petitioner, Kate Bartenwerfer, and her husband lost a jury verdict after allegedly failing to disclose defects in a house that they sold in San Francisco, California. In 2013, they declared a Chapter 7 bankruptcy. The petitioner argued in the bankruptcy court that she should be permitted to discharge debts relating to the fraud because she had no knowledge of the fraud by which the debt was incurred; instead, the fraud was allegedly done by her husband without her knowledge. The bankruptcy court adopted the "known or should have known" test arising out of Walker v. Citizens Bank, 726 F.2d 452 (8th Cir. 1984). Under that test, a court should permit the discharge of debt unless the debtor knew or should have known that the debt was incurred through fraud. Because the petitioner demonstrated that she did not know the debt was incurred by fraud, and had no reason to know, the court concluded that the debt that she had incurred should be discharged.

In 2021, the Ninth Circuit overruled the bankruptcy court, holding that the "knew or should have known" test applied by the bankruptcy court was inconsistent with Supreme Court precedent in Strang v. Bradner, 114 U.S. 555 (1885). and circuit precedent in In re Cecchini, 780 F.2d 1440 (9th Cir. 1986). Instead, the Ninth Circuit refused to discharge the debt because the debt itself was incurred through fraud, despite that the petitioner had no knowledge of it. The ruling widened a circuit split with the Ninth, Fifth, and Eleventh Circuits on the one hand and the Seventh and Eighth Circuits on the other.

The petitioner sought certiorari to the Supreme Court later that year, and certiorari was granted in 2022.

== Supreme Court ==
=== Oral argument ===
The Supreme Court heard oral argument on December 6, 2022. The justices focused on the language of 11 U.S.C § 523(a)(2)(A), which excepts from discharge debts incurred by "money... obtained by... actual fraud." A SCOTUSblog analyst argued that the justices' questions to counsel for the petitioner were more hostile than those to counsel for the respondent or the United States; they drew a distinction between the fraudulent origin of a debt and whether the debtor knows of that fraud.

=== Decision ===
On February 22, 2023, the Supreme Court unanimously held that fraudulently obtained debts cannot be discharged in bankruptcy. In so holding, the Court reasoned that the exception is triggered by whether the money was obtained by fraud; the question of who committed the fraud is irrelevant.

In her concurrence, Justice Sotomayor argued that the decision should apply only to debts obtained through the fraud of a partner or agent of the bankrupt.

=== Representation ===
The petitioner was represented by Sarah Harris and Lisa Blatt of Williams & Connolly; Iain Macdonald of Macdonald Fernandez; and Reno Fernandez of the Complex Appellate Litigation Group.

The respondent was represented by Zachary Tripp of Weil, Gotshal & Manges; and Janet Marie Brayer of the Law Offices of Janey Brayer.
