= Arizona v. Navajo Nation =

- Supreme Court of the United States

Argued March 20, 2023 Decided June 22, 2023
- Full case name: Arizona, et al. v. Navajo Nation, et al. Department of the Interior, et al. v. Navajo Nation, et al.
- Docket nos.: 21-1484; 22-51
- Citations: 599 U.S. 555 (more) 143 S.Ct. 1804, 216 L. Ed. 2d 540
- Argument: Oral argument

Holding
- The 1868 treaty establishing the Navajo Reservation reserved necessary water to accomplish the purpose of the Navajo Reservation but did not require the United States to take affirmative steps to secure water for the Tribe.

Court membership
- Chief Justice John Roberts Associate Justices Clarence Thomas · Samuel Alito; Sonia Sotomayor · Elena Kagan; Neil Gorsuch · Brett Kavanaugh; Amy Coney Barrett · Ketanji Brown Jackson

Case opinions
- Majority: Kavanaugh, joined by Roberts, Thomas, Alito, Barrett
- Concurrence: Thomas
- Dissent: Gorsuch, joined by Sotomayor, Kagan, Jackson

Laws applied
- Treaty of Bosque Redondo

Arizona v. Navajo Nation, 599 U.S. 555 (2023), was a United States Supreme Court case which determined that the Treaty of Bosque Redondo did not require the U.S. Government to take affirmative steps to secure water for the Navajo Nation.

== Background ==
In 1864, following conflicts between the Navajo and U.S. forces, roughly eight to ten thousand Navajo were forced to relocate from their native lands in the Four Corners region to Bosque Redondo, in what became known as the Long Walk. Although the land at Bosque Redondo, in New Mexico, was provided by the U.S. Government as a "permanent home," it proved inhospitable due to very poor soil quality. Soon after the Navajo were relocated there, starvation occurred and their population declined sharply. The United States and the Navajo consequently entered into the 1868 Treaty of Bosque Redondo, which allowed the Navajo to return to their native land in a newly established reservation along the Arizona–New Mexico border, and supplied them with seeds and equipment for farming. It provided that this land would be a "permanent home" for the Navajo.

A 1908 Supreme Court case, Winters v. United States, held that treaties establishing reservations should be construed to include water rights to support necessary agriculture. Further cases conceived of these Winters rights as held in trust along with other property rights of Tribes, in a "general trust relationship" between the U.S. government and tribal nations. In response to water scarcity later in the 20th century, the Navajo Nation began to assert its water rights in federal court. Notably, it attempted to have its water rights adjudicated in Arizona v. California, the long-running litigation over the lower Colorado River, but the U.S. government ultimately declined to assert its rights.

In 2003, the Navajo began the litigation that would eventually give rise to Arizona v. Navajo Nation by suing the U.S. government to obtain an assessment of the water rights and a plan to meet them. The Navajo alleged that the government had not fulfilled its trust obligations. The states of Arizona, Colorado, and Nevada intervened against the Navajo Nation to protect their interests over the Colorado River. The United States District Court for the District of Arizona initially dismissed the Navajo Nation's complaint, but on appeal, the Ninth Circuit reversed, ruling for the Navajo.

== Supreme Court ==
Oral arguments were heard on March 20, 2023. The U.S. Government, represented by Assistant to the Solicitor General Frederick Liu, participated as an amicus in support of the States. He argued that under the treaty, a Winters right to water is no more than a "stick in the bundle" of property rights that make up the Navajo Reservation, and the U.S. has no further responsibility to assist the Navajo in obtaining it. The States were represented by Rita P. Maguire, whose argument largely overlapped with that of the U.S. government. Shay Dvoretzky, representing the Navajo Nation, argued that the "general trust relationship" of the U.S. government to Indian tribes, which the Court had recognized in earlier cases, meant that the government did have additional responsibilities. He said that at this stage the tribe was only asking the government, as trustee of its water rights, to perform its fiduciary duties by determining the extent of the tribe's water rights in the lower Colorado River.

=== Majority ===
By a vote of 5–4, the Court ruled for Arizona; the opinion was by Justice Brett Kavanaugh. He wrote that the treaties were stipulations of property rights rather than obligations of the Federal Government to fulfill any proposed purposes of said treaty, and that the U.S. Government has no obligation to assist Tribes in securing the resources promised by treaties unless explicitly required by treaty terms.

=== Concurrence ===
Justice Clarence Thomas, who joined the majority opinion in full, concurred separately to suggest overruling prior cases in which the Court had adopted the canons of construction of Indian treaties.

=== Dissent ===
Justice Neil Gorsuch wrote the dissent, which was joined by Justices Elena Kagan, Sonia Sotomayor, and Ketanji Brown Jackson. He argued that the canons of Indian treaty construction, in light of the historical context of the treaty at issue, implied that some affirmative steps were required of the government. Gorsuch wrote that the U.S. government had been refusing to fulfill the treaty's promises since "Elvis was still making his rounds on The Ed Sullivan Show." Towards the end of the dissent, he also offered suggestions about how the Navajo Nation could continue to pursue water rights to the Colorado River.
