= Jack Daniel's Properties, Inc. v. VIP Products LLC =

- Supreme Court of the United States

Argued March 22, 2023 Decided June 8, 2023
- Full case name: Jack Daniel's Properties, Inc. v. VIP Products LLC
- Docket no.: 22-148
- Citations: 599 U.S. 140 (more)
- Argument: Oral argument
- Opinion announcement: Opinion announcement
- Decision: Opinion

Questions presented
- 1. Whether humorous use of another's trademark as one's own on a commercial product is subject to the Lanham Act's traditional likelihood-of-confusion analysis, or instead receives heightened First Amendment protection from trademark-infringement claims.; 2. Whether humorous use of another's mark as one’s own on a commercial product is "noncommercial" under 15 U.S.C. § 1125(c)(3)(C), thus barring as a matter of law a claim of dilution by tarnishment under the Trademark Dilution Revision Act.

Holding
- When an alleged infringer uses a trademark as a designation of source for the infringer's own goods, the Rogers test does not apply.

Court membership
- Chief Justice John Roberts Associate Justices Clarence Thomas · Samuel Alito; Sonia Sotomayor · Elena Kagan; Neil Gorsuch · Brett Kavanaugh; Amy Coney Barrett · Ketanji Brown Jackson

Case opinions
- Majority: Kagan, joined by unanimous
- Concurrence: Sotomayor, joined by Alito
- Concurrence: Gorsuch, joined by Thomas, Barrett

Laws applied
- 15 U.S.C. § 1125(c)(3)(C)

Jack Daniel's Properties, Inc. v. VIP Products LLC, 599 U.S. 140 (2023), was a United States Supreme Court case in which the court held that, when an alleged infringer uses a trademark as a designation of source for the infringer's own goods, the Rogers test does not apply. The case deals with a dog toy shaped similar to a Jack Daniel's whiskey bottle and label, but with parody elements, which Jack Daniel's asserted violated trademark law. The Court held in favor of Jack Daniel's because the toy company used its parody as its trademark, and the court left the Rogers test on parody intact.

== Background ==
VIP Products specializes in making dog toys. Among their line is a series of "Silly Squeakers": dog toys that are shaped and look like well known alcoholic beverages, but using dog-related puns. One of these was a product called "Bad Spaniels" which was shaped similarly to the Jack Daniel's whiskey bottle and label, with the dog puns in certain places, such as replacing the "Old No. 7 Brand Tennessee Sour Mash Whiskey" portion of the label with "Old No. 2 on your Tennessee carpet". The toy also included language that it was not associated with Jack Daniel's.

Jack Daniel's filed suit against VIP Products alleging:

1. Trademark infringement under the federal Lanham Act's likelihood-of-confusion framework
2. Trademark dilution by tarnishment, damaging Jack Daniel's mark by negatively associating it with dog poop

In the United States District Court for the District of Arizona, Judge Stephen M. McNamee ruled in favor of Jack Daniel's, finding that VIP's use of the trademarked elements were not protected by the First Amendment, and diluted Jack Daniel's trademarks, and enjoined VIP from selling the toy.

VIP appealed to the United States Court of Appeals for the Ninth Circuit, which reversed most of Judge McNamee's ruling in a unanimous decision. The Ninth Circuit agreed that a more demanding test was required to dismiss the dog toy as an expressive work covered by the First Amendment. It found that the Rogers test applied to the claim of infringement, and remanded for the district court to determine whether either prong of that test was satisfied. The ninth circuit reversed the finding of dilution by tarnishment, invoking the Trademark Dilution Revision Act's exception for "noncommercial use of a mark".

== Supreme Court ==
Jack Daniel's filed a petition for a writ of certiorari in the Supreme Court, asking it to hear the case. Jack Daniel's argued that while VIP's product might have First Amendment protections, they are making them at the expense of the Jack Daniel's trademark and public image. Several companies provided amicus briefs urging the Court to take the case, seeking the Court to rule in favor of protecting their trademarks from parody uses. In November 2022, the Court agreed to hear the case. Oral argument took place on March 22, 2023.

The court issued its unanimous ruling on June 8, 2023. The opinion, written by Justice Elena Kagan, dismissed the arguments over the Rogers test, and instead found for Jack Daniel's as VIP was using the parody of Jack Daniel's trademark as its own trademark, a violation of trademark law.
