= Helix Energy Solutions Group, Inc. v. Hewitt =

- Supreme Court of the United States

Argued October 12, 2022 Decided February 22, 2023
- Full case name: Helix Energy Solutions Group, Inc., et al. v. Michael J. Hewitt
- Docket no.: 21-984
- Citations: 598 U.S. 39 (more)
- Argument: Oral argument
- Opinion announcement: Opinion announcement

Holding
- Regardless of income level, workers are not considered salaried unless the conditions set out in the Fair Labor Standards Act of 1938 are met.

Court membership
- Chief Justice John Roberts Associate Justices Clarence Thomas · Samuel Alito; Sonia Sotomayor · Elena Kagan; Neil Gorsuch · Brett Kavanaugh; Amy Coney Barrett · Ketanji Brown Jackson

Case opinions
- Majority: Kagan, joined by Roberts, Thomas, Sotomayor, Barrett, Jackson
- Dissent: Gorsuch
- Dissent: Kavanaugh, joined by Alito

Laws applied
- Fair Labor Standards Act of 1938

Helix Energy Solutions Group, Inc. v. Hewitt, 598 U.S. 39 (2023), was a United States Supreme Court case in which the court held that, regardless of income level, workers are not considered salaried unless the conditions set out in the Fair Labor Standards Act of 1938 are met.

== Background ==
Michael Hewitt was a toolpusher and a supervisor on oil rigs for Helix Energy Solutions Group from 2014 to 2017. He was paid over $200,000 each year he worked for the company, at a flat daily rate. Hewitt was fired from the company in 2017, and the reasons are in dispute. He then filed a collective action under the Fair Labor Standards Act (FLSA) against Helix, asserting he was entitled to overtime pay. Various FLSA regulations exempt employees from overtime if they (1) perform managerial duties, (2) earn $100,000 or more each year, and (3) receive a weekly salary of $455 or higher on a salary basis. Hewitt fulfilled the first two conditions, but not the third, as he was paid daily. The United States District Court for the Southern District of Texas rejected Hewitt's claim, but the United States Court of Appeals for the Fifth Circuit reversed in a 2–1 opinion. The court later granted rehearing en banc and again reversed, this time in a 12–6 vote in an opinion by Judge James C. Ho.

Helix filed a petition for a writ of certiorari.

== Supreme Court ==
The U.S. Supreme Court granted certiorari on May 2, 2022. Oral arguments were held on October 12, 2022. On February 22, 2023, the Supreme Court affirmed the Fifth Circuit in a 6–2–1 decision.
