= Pugin v. Garland =

- Supreme Court of the United States

Decided June 22, 2023
- Full case name: Pugin v. Garland
- Docket no.: 22-23
- Citations: 599 U.S. 600 (more)

Holding
- An offense may "relate to" obstruction of justice under the Immigration and Nationality Act even if the offense does not require that an investigation or proceeding be pending.

Court membership
- Chief Justice John Roberts Associate Justices Clarence Thomas · Samuel Alito; Sonia Sotomayor · Elena Kagan; Neil Gorsuch · Brett Kavanaugh; Amy Coney Barrett · Ketanji Brown Jackson

Case opinions
- Majority: Kavanaugh
- Concurrence: Jackson
- Dissent: Sotomayor, joined by Gorsuch, Kagan (in part)

Laws applied
- Immigration and Nationality Act

Pugin v. Garland, 599 U.S. 600 (2023), was a United States Supreme Court case in which the Court held that an offense may "relate to" obstruction of justice under the Immigration and Nationality Act even if the offense does not require that an investigation or proceeding be pending.
