= Reed v. Goertz =

- Supreme Court of the United States

Argued October 11, 2022 Decided April 19, 2023
- Full case name: Reed v. Goertz
- Docket no.: 21-442
- Citations: 598 U.S. 230 (more) 143 S.Ct. 955, 215 L.Ed.2d 218
- Argument: Oral argument
- Opinion announcement: Opinion announcement

Case history
- Prior: United States Court of Appeals, Fifth Circuit No. 19-70022

Questions presented
- Did the statute of limitations begin to run when Reed's motion was denied or when the Texas Court of Criminal Appeals denied to rehear the trial?

Holding
- When a prisoner pursues state post-conviction DNA testing through the state-provided litigation process, the statute of limitations for a §1983 procedural due process claim begins to run when the state litigation ends, in this case when the Texas Court of Criminal Appeals denied Reed’s motion for rehearing.

Court membership
- Chief Justice John Roberts Associate Justices Clarence Thomas · Samuel Alito; Sonia Sotomayor · Elena Kagan; Neil Gorsuch · Brett Kavanaugh; Amy Coney Barrett · Ketanji Brown Jackson

Case opinions
- Majority: Kavanaugh, joined by Roberts, Sotomayor, Kagan, Barrett, Jackson
- Dissent: Thomas
- Dissent: Alito, joined by Gorsuch

Laws applied
- US Constitutional Amendment V, 42 U.S. Code § 1983

Reed v. Goertz, 598 U.S. 230 (2023), is a United States Supreme Court case in which the court held that, when a prisoner pursues state post-conviction DNA testing through the state-provided litigation process, the statute of limitations for a Section 1983 procedural due process claim begins to run when the state litigation ends.

== Background ==
A Texas jury found Rodney Reed guilty of the murder of Stacey Stites. During the penalty phase several women testified that Reed had raped and assaulted them. He was sentenced to death. In 2014, Reed filed a motion in Texas state court under the state's post-conviction DNA testing law. He requested DNA testing on certain pieces of evidence, including the belt used to strangle Stites. The state court denied Reed's motion, reasoning that the items Reed requested to be tested were not preserved through an adequate chain of custody. The Texas Court of Criminal Appeals agreed and denied Reed's motion for a rehearing. Reed then sued in federal court under 42 U.S. Code §1983, a federal law allowing citizens to sue state officials for violating their federally protected rights, claiming that Texas's post-conviction DNA testing law failed to provide procedural due process. Reed also argued that the law's strict chain of custody requirements was unconstitutional. The District Court dismissed his complaint while The Fifth Circuit affirmed on the ground that Reed’s §1983 claim was filed too late, after the applicable 2-year statute of limitations had run. The Fifth Circuit held that the limitations period began to run when the Texas trial court denied Reed’s motion, not when the Texas Court of Criminal Appeals denied rehearing.

== Supreme Court decision ==
Reed sought review of the Fifth Circuit decision by the Supreme Court and filed a writ of certiorari. The Supreme Court decided 6-3 that the limitations began when state litigation ended, which was when the Texas Court of Criminal Appeals denied Reed's motion for rehearing on the DNA testing claim, reversing the Fifth Circuit's decision. It is unclear when Reed's execution will occur.
