= Abitron Austria GmbH v. Hetronic International, Inc. =

- Supreme Court of the United States

Argued March 21, 2023 Decided June 29, 2023
- Full case name: Abitron Austria GmbH, et al. v. Hetronic International, Inc.
- Docket no.: 21-1043
- Citations: 600 U.S. 412 (more)
- Argument: Oral argument
- Opinion announcement: Opinion announcement

Case history
- Prior: Hetronic International, Inc. v. Hetronic Germany GmbH, et al., No. CIV-14-650-F (W.D. Okla. 2020), Hetronic International, Inc. v. Hetronic Germany GmbH, et al., 10 F.4th 1016 (10th Cir. 2021)

Questions presented
- Whether the court of appeals erred in applying the Lanham Act extraterritorially to petitioners' foreign sales, including purely foreign sales that never reached the United States or confused U.S. consumers.

Holding
- The Lanham Act does not apply to foreign conduct.

Court membership
- Chief Justice John Roberts Associate Justices Clarence Thomas · Samuel Alito; Sonia Sotomayor · Elena Kagan; Neil Gorsuch · Brett Kavanaugh; Amy Coney Barrett · Ketanji Brown Jackson

Case opinions
- Majority: Alito, joined by Thomas, Gorsuch, Kavanaugh, Jackson
- Concurrence: Jackson
- Concurrence: Sotomayor (in judgment), joined by Roberts, Kagan, Barrett

Laws applied
- Lanham Act

Abitron Austria GmbH v. Hetronic International, Inc., 600 U.S. 412 (2023), was a United States Supreme Court case regarding provisions of the Lanham Act. The Court decided whether or not the Act applies to foreign sales.

== Background ==
In the 1980s, German engineer Max Heckl founded Hetronic Steuersysteme GmbH. (HS), a German company. In 2000, Heckl would go on to form Hedtronic International, Inc. (HII), a U.S. company. HS and HII entered into an agreement that provided, among other things, that HS (and its two co-developers) were “sole owner[s]” of “all” intellectual property developed by any party, including “designs, product descriptions, trade marks, [and] trade names.”

In 2006, HS sold the "Hetronic" mark to HII. In 2008, Heckl would sell HII to the U.S. electronics company Methode Electronics, after which reorganized as respondent, Hedtronic International, Inc. This sale did not include the German company Hedtronic Steuersysteme, which had since been renamed Hedtronic Deutschland. Heckl sold Hedtronic Deutschland to Hedtronic Germany in 2010. Hetronic Germany was owned by Albert Fuchs and HydronicSteuersysteme GmbH, an Austrian company later renamed Hetronic Central Eastern Europe (HCEE).

Hetronic Germany and Hydronic-Steuersysteme licensed the “Hetronic” name from respondent (the reorganized Hectronic International, Inc.) and acted as its distributors. By this point, Fuchs was still unaware of the research and development agreement stating that Hetronic Steuersysteme (and its successor, Hetronic Germany) owned the intellectual property rights for the distributed products, as distinct from the "Hedtronic" trademark. Respondent later terminated this agreement.

Hetronic Germany and HCEE later reorganized as petitioners, Abitron Germany and Abitron Austria. Petitioners informed customers of the reorganization and new name – and their dissociation with other “Hetronic locations” like respondent – in letters sent on stationery containing “Hetronic Germany” and “Hetronic Central Eastern Europe” marks.

Understanding themselves to be in possession of the relevant trademarks, Abitron began competing against respondent (International). Abitron considered vying for the U.S. market, but the vast majority of Abitron's business remained in Germany and Austria.

== Lower Court Decisions ==
=== District Court ===
International sued Abitron under the Lanham Act. In their complaint, International alleged that Abitron's sale of radio controls violated International's U.S. registered trademarks, unregistered trademarks, and trade dress. Of Abitron's roughly $90 million "worldwide" sales, about $88 million (97%) were "purely foreign" – that is, sales of goods in foreign countries by foreign vendors to foreign buyers to be used in foreign countries. International also accused Abitron of $2 million in sales of products that "could have ended up in" the U.S. For example, this included sales to foreign buyers who used the radio controls in cranes that may have later reached the United States. Lastly, International accused Abitron of roughly $240 thousand of sales to U.S. customers, though the majority of those sales were to either International or one of its affiliates.

Petitioners sough summary judgment on the grounds that the Lanham Act did not apply extraterritorially to foreign sales. The United States District Court for the Western District of Oklahoma barred Abitron from introducing evidence that their "purely foreign" sales caused no consumer confusion among U.S. buyers. When a witness for respondents testified to domestic consumer confusion, petitioners were prevented from cross-examining this witness from clarifying that these examples involved non-U.S. buyers.

A jury awarded International roughly $90 million for violations of the Lanham Act, an amount equal to what International asserted Abitron's profits amounted to. This was despite the fact that a vast majority of these profits occurred outside the United States, and a great majority of the involved products never reached the United States. The District Court enjoined Abitron from using International's marks anywhere in the world.

=== Court of Appeals ===
The United States Court of Appeals for the Tenth Circuit affirmed in part. It decided not to limit the damages or the injunction to Abitron's solely U.S. sales. The court rested heavily on Steele v. Bulova Watch Co., 344 U.S. 280 (1952), which stated that the Lanham Act applied to conduct “consummated in a foreign country by a citizen and resident of the United States,” where the U.S. defendant took “essential steps” “in the United States.” The Tenth Circuit held that Steel implied some extraterritorial applications of the Lanham Act, but that many relevant details were still unclear. Other Courts of Appeals had developed tests for determining when the Act should apply extraterritorially, but instead developed its own two-step test for the purposes of this case. At the first step of the test, the court considered whether the defendants were U.S. citizens. If so, then the Lanham Act applies extrateritorially without further inquiry. If not, then the court proceeds to the second step of the test, which asks whether " the defendant’s conduct had a substantial effect on U.S. commerce.”

At step one, the court concluded that petitioners were not U.S. citizens. At step two, however, the court concluded that petitioner's acts had a “substantial effect on U.S. commerce”, and that the Lanham Act should thus apply extraterritorially. Moreover, it held that the Act applied extraterritorially to all of petitioners’ foreign sales, based on the 3% that may have reached the U.S. The Court suggested that if any foreign conduct confused U.S. consumers, then the Act should apply to all of Abitron's foreign conduct. The Tenth Circuit did, however, restrict the injunction to only “countries in which [International] currently markets or sells its products.”

== Supreme Court ==
Abitron petitioned the Supreme Court to hear its case on January 21, 2022. On November 4, 2022, the Court granted certiorari. Oral arguments were held on March 21, 2023. On June 29, 2023, the Supreme Court vacated the Tenth Circuit's judgment and remanded for further proceedings in a unanimous decision that fractured 5–4 on the reasoning.

== See also ==
- List of United States Supreme Court cases by the Roberts Court
