= United States v. Hansen =

- Supreme Court of the United States

Argued March 27, 2023 Decided June 23, 2023
- Full case name: United States v. Helaman Hansen
- Docket no.: 22-179
- Citations: 599 U.S. 762 (more) 143 S. Ct. 1932
- Argument: Oral argument
- Opinion announcement: Opinion announcement

Case history
- Prior: Defendant convicted, and motion to dismiss two counts denied (E.D. Cal. 2017); vacated and remanded in part, 25 F.4th 1103 (9th Cir. 2022); rehearing denied, 40 F.4th 1049 (9th Cir. 2022); cert. granted (Dec. 9, 2022)

Questions presented
- Whether the federal criminal prohibition against encouraging or inducing unlawful immigration for commercial advantage or private financial gain, in violation of 8 U.S.C. 1324(a)(1)(A)(iv) and (B)(i), is facially unconstitutional on First Amendment overbreadth grounds.

Holding
- Because §1324(a)(1)(A)(iv) forbids only the purposeful solicitation and facilitation of specific acts known to violate federal law, the clause is not unconstitutionally overbroad.

Court membership
- Chief Justice John Roberts Associate Justices Clarence Thomas · Samuel Alito; Sonia Sotomayor · Elena Kagan; Neil Gorsuch · Brett Kavanaugh; Amy Coney Barrett · Ketanji Brown Jackson

Case opinions
- Majority: Barrett, joined by Roberts, Thomas, Alito, Kagan, Gorsuch, Kavanaugh
- Concurrence: Thomas
- Dissent: Jackson, joined by Sotomayor

Laws applied
- U.S. Const. amend. I

United States v. Hansen, 599 U.S. 762 (2023), was a United States Supreme Court case about whether a federal law that criminalizes encouraging or inducing illegal immigration is unconstitutionally overbroad, violating the First Amendment right to free speech.

== Background ==
Helaman Hansen operated an adult adoption program which he falsely claimed would lead to citizenship for undocumented immigrants. He persuaded victims to illegally come to the United States or overstay their visas. In a 2017 federal court trial, a jury convicted him of multiple counts of mail fraud, wire fraud, and encouraging or inducing illegal immigration for financial gain. The district court sentenced Hansen to 20 years in prison.

The two counts of encouraging or inducing were for violations of 8 U.S.C. § 1324(a)(1)(A)(iv), which states that it is a crime to "encourage[] or induce[] an alien to come to, enter, or reside in the United States, knowing or in reckless disregard of the fact that such coming to, entry, or residence is or will be in violation of law". Hansen appealed to the U.S. Court of Appeals for the Ninth Circuit, arguing that this provision was unconstitutionally overbroad under the First Amendment.

Meanwhile, the Court of Appeals was considering another case, United States v. Sineneng-Smith, involving the same First Amendment question, and put Hansen's case on hold. Sineneng-Smith went to the Supreme Court, but the Supreme Court in 2020 decided that case on a procedural issue without deciding the First Amendment question.

Afterwards, the court of appeals decided Hansen's case, ruling in Hansen's favor that the law was overbroad and unconstitutional. The court subsequently denied a petition for rehearing en banc. The government petitioned to the Supreme Court, which agreed to hear the case.

== Supreme Court ==
The Supreme Court granted certiorari on December 9, 2022. Oral arguments were held on March 27, 2023. On June 23, 2023, the Supreme Court upheld the law in a 7–2 vote, holding that it did not violate the First Amendment right to free speech.

=== Opinion of the court ===
Writing for the court, Justice Amy Coney Barrett interpreted the key words "encourages or induces" narrowly. The government had argued that those words were terms of art, meaning criminal law concepts of solicitation and facilitation (or aiding and abetting). Hansen and the court of appeals below, on the other hand, had interpreted the words in their ordinary meaning, which would potentially include a broad range of protected speech. The court agreed with the government that Congress used the words "encourages or induces" in the specialized sense. This implicitly includes the requirement of intent (mens rea) traditionally associated with solicitation and facilitation. The court added that the canon of constitutional avoidance favored the narrower reading if it was at least "fairly possible". Under this reading, various hypothetical examples of overbroad applications would not meet the elements of the crime.

The court applied the overbreadth doctrine as expressed in United States v. Williams (2008): a law is unconstitutional if it "prohibits a substantial amount of protected speech" relative to its "plainly legitimate sweep". Here, the law's "plainly legitimate sweep" covers nonexpressive conduct, for example smuggling, not implicating the freedom of speech at all. The only kind of speech it might cover is limited to "speech integral to unlawful conduct", and such speech is an exception to the First Amendment.

Lastly, the court acknowledged but did not rule on the "'mismatch' theory" advanced by Hansen. Under that theory, the First Amendment does not allow criminalizing speech that solicits or facilitates a civil violation, and illegal immigration is often only a civil violation, not a crime. The court held that, regardless of whether that argument is correct, the ratio of invalid to valid applications of the law would not be high enough for the court to strike it down as overbroad.

=== Dissent ===
Justice Ketanji Brown Jackson dissented, joined by Justice Sonia Sotomayor, accusing the majority of rewriting the text. Jackson argued that, although "encourages" or "induces" often appear together with other terms like soliciting or facilitating or aiding-and-abetting, that does not mean they can be conflated or incorporate the same implications. She also disagreed with the majority's analysis of the history of the statute. The text had been revised several times by Congress and formerly included the words "solicit" and "assist". Jackson argued that the removal of those words was a significant change in meaning; the majority argued that Congress was only streamlining unnecessary language rather than making a sweeping expansion to the law. Jackson further argued that use of constitutional avoidance was especially inappropriate in the context of an overbreadth challenge.

=== Thomas's concurrence ===
Justice Clarence Thomas joined the majority in full, but also wrote a separate concurrence. He reiterated his general opposition to the doctrine of overbreadth, similar to his previous solo opinions in United States v. Sineneng-Smith (2020) and Americans for Prosperity Foundation v. Bonta (2021).
