= Lac du Flambeau Band of Lake Superior Chippewa Indians v. Coughlin =

- Supreme Court of the United States

Argued April 24, 2023 Decided June 15, 2023
- Full case name: Lac du Flambeau Band of Lake Superior Chippewa Indians v. Coughlin
- Docket no.: 22-227
- Citations: 599 U.S. 382 (more)
- Argument: Oral argument

Holding
- Native American Tribes are not immune from the automatic stay of the Bankruptcy Code

Court membership
- Chief Justice John Roberts Associate Justices Clarence Thomas · Samuel Alito; Sonia Sotomayor · Elena Kagan; Neil Gorsuch · Brett Kavanaugh; Amy Coney Barrett · Ketanji Brown Jackson

Case opinions
- Majority: Jackson, joined by Roberts, Alito, Sotomayor, Kagan, Kavanaugh, Barrett
- Concurrence: Thomas (in judgment)
- Dissent: Gorsuch

Laws applied
- U.S. Bankruptcy Code

Lac du Flambeau Band of Lake Superior Chippewa Indians v. Coughlin, 599 U.S. 382 (2023), was a United States Supreme Court case which determined that Native Americans Tribes are not immune from the automatic stay of the Bankruptcy Code.

== Background ==
Brian Coughlin obtained a payday loan from Lendgreen, an online small high-interest loan provider indirectly owned by the Lac du Flambeau Band of Lake Superior Chippewa. Soon after, Coughlin filed a Chapter 13 bankruptcy case before the Bankruptcy Court. Despite the automatic stay of collection efforts imposed by section 362 of the Bankruptcy Code, Lendgreen continued to request repayment of the loan provided. In response to this, Coughlin would move to file a motion before the Bankruptcy Court requesting an automatic stay while the Tribe opted to file a 'motion to dismiss' Coughlin's respective motion. The Bankruptcy Court would go on to deny Coughlin's stay motion arguing that, given the Tribes were sovereign nations, they were subsequently immune from such a suit. Coughlin would go on to appeal the decision to the First Circuit Court of Appeals who subsequently reversed the Bankruptcy Court's ruling siding in favor of Coughlin. Following this, the Tribe appealed the case to the Supreme Court who agreed to rehear the case.

== Supreme Court ==
=== Majority ===
On June 15, 2023, Justice Jackson issued the majority opinion for the court. In her opinion, Jackson noted that abrogation of sovereign immunity by Congress is only applicable provided "unmistakably clear" language within the provided congressional statute. In doing so, Jackson commented that "sovereign immunity is abrogated as to a governmental unit" and that a tribe is considered to be covered under such a description as a "'governmental unit' exudes comprehensiveness from beginning to end". According to Jackson, section 362's phrasing of the automatic stay as it relates to 'other foreign or domestic government[s]' indicated a comprehensive inclusion of the varied "list of governments" and their respective subdivided components that Congress had established. Given Tribes are considered to be governments, they subsequently fall underneath the Code's jurisdiction as the statute "unequivocally abrogates the sovereign immunity of all governments, categorically". A 'governmental unit', as understood by Jackson, could therefore not be read to exclude "certain governments … from those provisions’ reach, notwithstanding the fact that they engage in tax and regulatory activities". In emphasizing that the terminology of 'other foreign or domestic government[s]' was truly categorical, Jackson noted that "[f]ew phrases in the English language express all-inclusiveness more than the pairing of two extremes" and that a deliberate inclusion of such in the statute indicated an "unmistakabl[e] intent to cover all governments".

=== Concurrence ===
Justice Thomas issued a concurring opinion agreeing in judgment with the majority. In his opinion, Thomas expressed hesitancy towards the belief "that tribes possess sovereign immunity at all", arguing that if immunity did exist for the tribes, it would not extend outside of their territory nor on a level equal to those of the states. Thomas further contended that the development of tribal sovereign immunity was a judicial construct that should be abandoned as it was brought about "almost by accident" and with "little analysis". According to Thomas, sovereign immunity, to the extent a tribe had any, was "unjustified" as it developed through common law interpretation rather than Constitutional interpretation, and would further inflame the relationships between the Tribes and states.

=== Dissent ===
Justice Gorsuch issued a dissenting opinion arguing that, given there was no explicit mention of the Tribes being covered by the code, the tribes were not under obligation to follow the code's regulations. In his dissent, Gorsuch contended that the code's phrasing of 'other foreign or domestic government[s]' was not applicable to the Tribes as, "properly understood, Tribes are neither of those things", with such an assumption only able to come through a generalized reading of the statute as "every government, everywhere". Given this perceived lack of clear language, Gorsuch argued that "If Congress wishes to abrogate tribal immunity, its 'decision must be clear.' And the Legislature must 'unequivocally express' its decision in the text of a statute".
