= Samia v. United States =

- Supreme Court of the United States

Argued March 29, 2023 Decided June 23, 2023
- Full case name: Adam Samia, aka Sal, aka Adam Samic v. United States
- Docket no.: 22-196
- Citations: 599 U.S. 635 (more)
- Argument: Oral argument
- Opinion announcement: Opinion announcement

Questions presented
- Whether the admission of a codefendant's redacted out-of-court confession that immediately inculpates a defendant based on the surrounding context violates the defendant's rights under the Confrontation Clause of the Sixth Amendment.

Holding
- The Confrontation Clause was not violated by the admission of a non-testifying codefendant’s confession that did not directly inculpate the defendant and was subject to a proper limiting instruction.

Court membership
- Chief Justice John Roberts Associate Justices Clarence Thomas · Samuel Alito; Sonia Sotomayor · Elena Kagan; Neil Gorsuch · Brett Kavanaugh; Amy Coney Barrett · Ketanji Brown Jackson

Case opinions
- Majority: Thomas, joined by Roberts, Alito, Gorsuch, Kavanaugh; Barrett (all but Part II–A)
- Concurrence: Barrett (in part)
- Dissent: Kagan, joined by Sotomayor, Jackson
- Dissent: Jackson

Laws applied
- U.S. Const. amend. VI

Samia v. United States, 599 U.S. 635 (2023), was a United States Supreme Court case related to the Confrontation Clause of the Sixth Amendment to the United States Constitution.

== Background ==
Adam Samia was tried along with two codefendants for the murder of a real-estate agent that took place in the Philippines. Both of Samia's codefendants admitted to participating in the murder, but disputed the government's jurisdiction over the crime. Samia, however, maintained his innocence.

The United States District Court for the Southern District of New York denied Samia's motion to sever his trial and permitted the introduction of an out-of-court confession that had been given by his codefendant. In this confession, the codefendant identified Samia as the person who pulled the trigger. Due to clear concerns regarding the Sixth Amendment, the court required the government to redact Samia's name from the confession, and to replace it with references to the "other person". The government, in its opening statement, had stated that the evidence contained in this confession would be some of the "most crucial" evidence that would incriminate Samia. At trial, the confession was introduced through the testimony of one of the government's agents. The government questioned the agent about the "other person" mentioned in the confession, eliciting additional details about that person's role. Over Samia's objections, the district court held that the redactions were sufficient to avoid a violation of the Sixth Amendment. The trial jury convicted Samia of, among other crimes, murder for hire, and conspiracy to commit murder for hire.

Samia appealed to the United States Court of Appeals for the Second Circuit, which affirmed the lower court's decision. In its decision, the appellate court applied existing precedent from the Second Circuit that instructs trial courts to assess the redacted confession in isolation from all other evidence in determining whether it incriminates the defendant. At the time the Second Circuit handed down its affirmation, United States Courts of Appeals had split on the question of whether a codefendant's redacted out-of-court confession must be assessed in isolation or in a broader context when determining when a violation of the Confrontation Clause has occurred.

On August 30, 2022, Samia petitioned the United States Supreme Court for a writ of certiorari, which was granted on December 13, 2022. Oral arguments were held on March 29, 2023. On June 23, 2023, the Supreme Court affirmed the Second Circuit in a 6–3 decision.

== See also ==
- Bruton v. United States (1968), a case outlawing the introduction of a codefendant's incriminating confession.
