= National Pork Producers Council v. Ross =

- Supreme Court of the United States

Argued October 11, 2022 Decided May 11, 2023
- Full case name: National Pork Producers Council, et al. v. Karen Ross, in Her Official Capacity as Secretary of the California Department of Food & Agriculture, et al.
- Docket no.: 21-468
- Citations: 598 U.S. 356 (more)
- Argument: Oral argument
- Opinion announcement: Opinion announcement

Case history
- Prior: Motion to dismiss and motion for judgment on the pleadings granted, 456 F.Supp.3d 1201 (S.D. Cal. 2020); affirmed, 6 F.4th 1021 (9th Cir. 2021); cert. granted, 596 U.S. ___ (2022).

Holding
- Affirmed the lower courts, dismissing the case and allowing the law to stand.

Court membership
- Chief Justice John Roberts Associate Justices Clarence Thomas · Samuel Alito; Sonia Sotomayor · Elena Kagan; Neil Gorsuch · Brett Kavanaugh; Amy Coney Barrett · Ketanji Brown Jackson

Case opinions
- Majority: Gorsuch (Parts I, II, III, IV–A, and V), joined by Thomas, Sotomayor, Kagan, Barrett
- Plurality: Gorsuch (Parts IV–B and IV–D), joined by Thomas and Barrett
- Plurality: Gorsuch (Part IV–C), joined by Thomas, Sotomayor, Kagan
- Concurrence: Sotomayor (in part), joined by Kagan
- Concurrence: Barrett (in part)
- Concur/dissent: Roberts, joined by Alito, Kavanaugh, Jackson
- Concur/dissent: Kavanaugh

Laws applied
- U.S. Const. art I, § 8, cl. 3

National Pork Producers Council v. Ross, 598 U.S. 356 (2023), is a United States Supreme Court case related to the Dormant Commerce Clause.

== Background ==
In 2018, California's voters approved Proposition 12, which sought to better the treatment of pigs kept for livestock by barring the sale of pork produced in conditions common in the industry. Much of the pork consumed in the state was imported from other parts of the United States, so the proposition affected the national pork industry as a whole. A group of farmers and corporations in the pork industry, led by the National Pork Producers Council (NPPC) and the American Farm Bureau Federation (AFBF), sued the California Department of Food and Agriculture, led by Karen Ross. They asserted that the proposition violated the Dormant Commerce Clause, which prohibits state laws that discriminate against or have an undue impact on interstate commerce.

The United States District Court for the Southern District of California dismissed the lawsuit, with judge Thomas J. Whelan stating that Proposition 12 did not attempt to fully regulate the pork industry in other states. The ruling was upheld in a 3–0 decision at the United States Court of Appeals for the Ninth Circuit.

NPPC filed a petition for a writ of certiorari. Certiorari was granted on March 28, 2022, and oral arguments were heard on October 11, 2022.

The Biden administration asked the court to overturn the law in order to protect the country's pork industry.

== Judgment ==
The Supreme Court issued its decision on May 11, 2023. In a 5–4 ruling, the court upheld the lower court ruling in dismissing the lawsuit and ruling that Proposition 12 was legal. The majority opinion was written by Justice Neil Gorsuch, joined by Justices Thomas, Sotomayor, Kagan, and Barrett. Gorsuch accepted that states do have an interest in protecting the public health and welfare, and that this may extend to behavior occurring outside of the state. However, Gorsuch continued that while the Constitution does outline specific behavior that cannot be overridden by state laws, the requirements of Proposition 12 fell well outside that.

Gorsuch addressed the Supreme Court's 1970 Pike v. Bruce Church, Inc. ruling, agreeing with the judgment but stating that its standard of prohibiting "clearly excessive" effects on interstate commerce was too vague. The court did not have a majority opinion regarding the weighing of noneconomic benefits such as animal welfare against economic costs. In Section IV-B, joined only by a plurality, Gorsuch suggested that courts should only be able to use the comparative balancing test from Pike when the variables to be balanced can be measured and compared directly. He argued that the comparison of economic cost to humane treatment was "incommensurable."

Proposition 12 was upheld by a 5–4 majority. However, while the majority upheld Proposition 12, no single rationale for that outcome was joined by a majority of the justices. Three of the five majority justices (Gorsuch, Thomas, and Barrett) upheld Proposition 12 because they believed that the burdens and benefits at issue in the case were not capable of being balanced by a court. That plurality would not apply Pike to cases in which the burdens and benefits are incommensurate. A separate but overlapping group of four of the five majority justices (Gorsuch, Thomas, Sotomayor and Kagan) believed that the petitioners had failed to plausibly allege a burden on interstate commerce in the first place. Justices Sotomayor and Kagan wrote a separate concurrence to clarify that they did believe that it was possible for such burdens and benefits to be weighed in a Pike analysis.

A minority believed that the case should be remanded to the lower court for further factual development in order to decide whether the petitioners had sufficiently stated a claim under Pike and decide whether the "'burden . . . [was] clearly excessive in relation to the putative local benefits.'"

Legal journalist Ian Millhiser wrote that the case was a rare instance of the Court reducing the judiciary's ability to block state laws.

== See also ==
- Baldwin v. G.A.F. Seelig, Inc.
