= Jones v. Hendrix =

- Supreme Court of the United States

Argued November 1, 2022 Decided June 22, 2023
- Full case name: Markus Deangelo Jones v. Dewayne Hendrix, Warden
- Docket no.: 21-857
- Citations: 599 U.S. 465 (more)
- Argument: Oral argument
- Opinion announcement: Opinion announcement

Questions presented
- Whether federal inmates who did not — because established circuit precedent stood firmly against them — challenge their convictions on the ground that the statute of conviction did not criminalize their activity may apply for habeas relief under 28 U.S.C. § 2241 after the Supreme Court later makes clear in a retroactively applicable decision that the circuit precedent was wrong and that they are legally innocent of the crime of conviction.

Holding
- Section 2255(e) does not allow a prisoner asserting an intervening change in interpretation of a criminal statute to circumvent the Antiterrorism and Effective Death Penalty Act of 1996’s (AEDPA) restrictions on second or successive §2255 motions by filing a §2241 habeas petition

Court membership
- Chief Justice John Roberts Associate Justices Clarence Thomas · Samuel Alito; Sonia Sotomayor · Elena Kagan; Neil Gorsuch · Brett Kavanaugh; Amy Coney Barrett · Ketanji Brown Jackson

Case opinions
- Majority: Thomas, joined by Roberts, Alito, Gorsuch, Kavanaugh, Barrett
- Dissent: Sotomayor and Kagan
- Dissent: Jackson

Laws applied
- Antiterrorism and Effective Death Penalty Act of 1996

Jones v. Hendrix, 599 U.S. 465 (2023), was a landmark United States Supreme Court case related to habeas corpus.

== Background ==
Markus Jones was convicted in 2000 of being a felon in possession of a firearm, a federal crime. His first habeas petition was resolved in 2006. In 2019, in Rehaif v. United States, the Supreme Court held that people convicted of prohibited possession crimes under § 922(g) must be aware of their unlawful status, in addition to knowingly possessing firearms. Under the Antiterrorism and Effective Death Penalty Act of 1996, prisoners are barred from filing "second or successive" petitions for habeas corpus unless they meet certain exceptions, including if the Supreme Court has set forth a "new rule of constitutional law." However, there is no analogous exception for changes in the interpretation of criminal statutes. Jones tried to seek relief under 28 U.S.C. § 2241, but was unsuccessful. The United States Court of Appeals for the Eighth Circuit held that no provision of federal habeas law allowed for review of his revised Rehaif claim, as he had already filed his first habeas petition a decade earlier.

Jones filed a petition for a writ of certiorari.

== Supreme Court ==
Certiorari was granted in the case on May 16, 2022. On June 17, 2022, the Solicitor General of the United States announced she would not defend the Eighth Circuit's judgment. On June 28, 2022, the Supreme Court appointed Morgan L. Ratner to argue as amicus curiae in support of the judgment below. Oral arguments were held on November 1, 2022. On June 22, 2023, the Supreme Court affirmed the Eighth Circuit in a 6–3 decision.
