= Mallory v. Norfolk Southern Railway Co. =

- Supreme Court of the United States

Argued November 8, 2022 Decided June 27, 2023
- Full case name: Robert Mallory v. Norfolk Southern Railway Co.
- Docket no.: 21-1168
- Citations: 600 U.S. 122 (more)
- Argument: Oral argument
- Opinion announcement: Opinion announcement

Case history
- Prior: Dismissed (Court of Common Pleas of Philadelphia County); affirmed, 266 A.3d 542 (Pa. 2021); certiorari granted (April 25, 2022)

Questions presented
- Whether the Due Process Clause of the Fourteenth Amendment prohibits a state from requiring a corporation to consent to personal jurisdiction to do business in the state.

Holding
- A Pennsylvania law requiring out-of-state companies that register to do business in Pennsylvania to agree to appear in Pennsylvania courts is consistent with Due Process.

Court membership
- Chief Justice John Roberts Associate Justices Clarence Thomas · Samuel Alito; Sonia Sotomayor · Elena Kagan; Neil Gorsuch · Brett Kavanaugh; Amy Coney Barrett · Ketanji Brown Jackson

Case opinions
- Majority: Gorsuch (Parts I and III–B), joined by Thomas, Alito, Sotomayor, Jackson
- Plurality: Gorsuch (Parts II, III–A, and IV), joined by Thomas, Sotomayor, Jackson
- Concurrence: Jackson
- Concurrence: Alito (in part and in judgment)
- Dissent: Barrett, joined by Roberts, Kagan, Kavanaugh

Laws applied
- U.S. Const. amend. XIV

Mallory v. Norfolk Southern Railway Co., 600 U.S. 122 (2023), was a United States Supreme Court case in which the court held that a Pennsylvania law is consistent with Due Process. That law requires out-of-state companies to agree to appear, for all lawsuits against them, in Pennsylvania courts as a prerequisite to registering for business in the state.

== Background ==
Robert Mallory sued Norfolk Southern Railway in the Pennsylvania Court of Common Pleas in and for Philadelphia County under the Federal Employers Liability Act, asserting his work for the corporation exposed him to carcinogens. Mallory had worked for the railroad in Ohio and Virginia, and both he and the company resided in Virginia at the time as well. The sole basis for personal jurisdiction over the company in Pennsylvania was that it had implicitly consented by registering to do business in the commonwealth. In Pennoyer v. Neff, the Supreme Court delivered a major ruling on personal jurisdiction, which was later upended by the International Shoe Co. v. Washington decision. The Supreme Court of Pennsylvania sided against Mallory, ruling that consent-by-registration jurisdiction does violate the Due Process Clause of the Fourteenth Amendment to the United States Constitution.

Mallory filed a petition for a writ of certiorari.

== Supreme Court ==
Certiorari was granted in the case on April 25, 2022. Oral arguments were heard on November 8, 2022. On June 27, 2023, the U.S. Supreme Court vacated the Supreme Court of Pennsylvania's decision and remanded for further proceedings in a 4–1–4 decision.

=== Majority ===
Pennsylvania requires out-of-state companies that register to do business in the Commonwealth to agree to appear in its courts on “any cause of action” against them. 42 Pa. Cons. Stat. § 5301(a)(2)(i), (b) (2019)

The issue in this case was "whether the Due Process Clause of the Fourteenth Amendment prohibits a State from requiring an out-of-state corporation to consent to personal jurisdiction to do business there". The majority ruled against Norfolk Southern and the Pennsylvania Supreme Court, finding that Pennsylvania courts did possess personal jurisdiction and that the Due Process Clause was not violated.

The Majority denied the request to overturn Pennsylvania Fire Ins. Co. of Philadelphia v. Gold Issue Mining & Milling Co., 243 U.S. 93 (1917) and found that precedent comparable with International Shoe Co. v. Washington.

=== Concurrences ===
Justice Ketanji Brown Jackson wrote separately to discuss the precedent of Insurance Corp. of Ireland v. Compagnie des Bauxites de Guinee, 456 U.S. 694 (1982) and explain that the railroad did waive its personal jurisdiction. She also mentions that the railroad was not coerced into waiving its personal jurisdiction; rather, Norfolk Southern wanted to do business in Pennsylvania and so willingly chose to waive its personal jurisdiction.

Justice Samuel Alito, who concurred in part and in the judgment, expressed concern about the Dormant Commerce Clause, writing "I am not convinced, however, that the Constitution permits a State to impose such a submission-to-jurisdiction requirement". To Alito, "there is a good prospect that Pennsylvania’s assertion of jurisdiction here—over an out-of-state company in a suit brought by an out-of-state plaintiff on claims wholly unrelated to Pennsylvania—violates the Commerce Clause"

Alito also explicitly mentioned "we have never held that the Due Process Clause protects against forum shopping".

=== Dissent ===
Justice Amy Coney Barrett dissented, expressing concern that the Majority's decision would make specific jurisdiction "superfluous" for corporation because these state laws require corporations who do any business in the state to consent to personal jurisdiction.

Barrett wrote that "while our [Supreme Court's] due process precedent permits States to place reasonable conditions on foreign corporations in exchange for access to their markets, there is nothing reasonable about a State extracting consent in cases where it has "'no connection whatsoever'".

Barrett also disagreed that Pennsylvania Fire represented controlling precedent, differentiating it by explaining that in that case, the company had explicitly consented to waive personal jurisdiction. Here, Norfolk Southern never explicitly consented; rather, it was deemed to have waived personal jurisdiction by registering in the state.
