= Health & Hospital Corp. of Marion County v. Talevski =

- Supreme Court of the United States

Argued November 8, 2022 Decided June 8, 2023
- Full case name: Health and Hospital Corporation of Marion County, et al. v. Ivanka Talevski, Personal Representative of the Estate of Gorgi Talevski, Deceased
- Docket no.: 21-806
- Citations: 599 U.S. 166 (more)
- Argument: Oral argument
- Opinion announcement: Opinion announcement

Questions presented
- (1) Whether, in light of compelling historical evidence to the contrary, the Supreme Court should reexamine its holding that Spending Clause legislation gives rise to privately enforceable rights under 42 U.S.C. § 1983; and (2) Whether, assuming Spending Clause statutes ever give rise to private rights enforceable via Section 1983, the Federal Nursing Home Amendments Act of 1987's transfer and medication rules do so.

Holding
- The provisions of the Federal Nursing Home Reform Act at issue unambiguously create rights enforceable under 42 U.S.C. §1983, and private enforcement under §1983 is compatible with the FNHRA’s remedial scheme. A plaintiff can file a federal civil rights claim because of violation of the Federal Nursing Home Reform Act.

Court membership
- Chief Justice John Roberts Associate Justices Clarence Thomas · Samuel Alito; Sonia Sotomayor · Elena Kagan; Neil Gorsuch · Brett Kavanaugh; Amy Coney Barrett · Ketanji Brown Jackson

Case opinions
- Majority: Jackson, joined by Roberts, Sotomayor, Kagan, Gorsuch, Kavanaugh, Barrett
- Concurrence: Gorsuch
- Concurrence: Barrett, joined by Roberts
- Dissent: Thomas
- Dissent: Alito, joined by Thomas

Health & Hospital Corp. of Marion County v. Talevski, 599 U.S. 166 (2023), was a United States Supreme Court case related to private enforcement of Spending Clause statutes. It relates to whether third parties can initiate lawsuits against public institutions for violations of Congressional spending bills under claims of Section 1983, which was established to protect individual rights from constitutional violations from public institutions.

== Background ==
Gorgi Talevski had dementia and his family placed him in a nursing home operated by the Health and Hospital Corporation of Marion County (HHC). As Talevski's condition declined, HHC transferred him between various facilities, and modified his course of medication. Talevski's family objected to these changes, and eventually sued under Section 1983 of the Ku Klux Klan Act (codified at 42 U.S.C. § 1983) to enforce the Federal Nursing Home Amendments Act of 1987 (FNHRA) against HHC. Talevski asserted he could enforce the FNHRA, which specifies conditions for facilities to receive federal Medicaid funding, against HHC, because it confers federal rights that Section 1983 provides a venue to vindicate; the Supreme Court has generally upheld that private citizens can sue under Section 1983, including for Medicare programs, if the government had deprived them of "any rights, privileges, or immunities secured by the Constitution and laws" as recently as Edelman v. Jordan (1974). The United States District Court for the Northern District of Indiana disagreed and dismissed his complaint, but the United States Court of Appeals for the Seventh Circuit reversed.

HHC filed a petition for a writ of certiorari, asserting a conflict with cases like Gonzaga University v. Doe and Blessing v. Freestone.

== Supreme Court ==
Certiorari was granted in the case on May 2, 2022. Amici briefs on in support of HHC were submitted by the National Conference of State Legislatures and the American Healthcare Association. Amici in support of Talevski were submitted by Public Citizen, the Constitutional Accountability Center, and the AARP. The case was argued on November 8, 2022.
