= 2022 term opinions of the Supreme Court of the United States =

October 2022 to October 2023 opinions

The 2022 term of the Supreme Court of the United States began October 3, 2022, and concluded October 1, 2023. The table below illustrates which opinion was filed by each justice in each case and which justices joined each opinion.

== Table key ==
Delivered the court's opinion

Joined the court's opinion

Filed a concurrence

Joined a concurrence

Filed a dissent

Joined a dissent

Filed a concurrence/dissent

Joined a concurrence/dissent

Filed a statement

Joined a statement

Did not participate in the decision
- Decisions that do not note an argument date were decided without oral argument. Decisions that do not note a justice delivering the court's opinion are per curiam.
- Multiple concurrences and dissents within a case are numbered, with joining votes numbered accordingly. Justices frequently join multiple opinions in a single case; each vote is subdivided accordingly.
- An asterisk ( * ) in the court's opinion denotes that it was only a majority in part or a plurality. An asterisk in a joining vote denotes that the justice joined it only in part.
- A dash ( - ) denotes that the justice voted without filing or joining an opinion.

== 2022 term opinions ==
#	Case name and citation	Argued	Decided	Roberts	Thomas	Alito	Sotomayor	Kagan	Gorsuch	Kavanaugh	Barrett	Jackson
1	Arellano v. McDonough, 598 U.S. 1	October 4, 2022	January 23, 2023									
2	In re Grand Jury, 598 U.S. 15	January 9, 2023	January 23, 2023									
3	Cruz v. Arizona, 598 U.S. 17	November 1, 2022	February 22, 2023									
4	Helix Energy Solutions Group, Inc. v. Hewitt, 598 U.S. 39	October 12, 2022	February 22, 2023			2			1	2		
5	Bartenwerfer v. Buckley, 598 U.S. 69	December 6, 2022	February 22, 2023									
6	Bittner v. United States, 598 U.S. 85	November 2, 2022	February 28, 2023	*		*			*	*		
7	Delaware v. Pennsylvania, 598 U.S. 115	October 3, 2022	February 28, 2023		*	*			*		*	
8	Luna Perez v. Sturgis Public Schools, 598 U.S. 142	January 18, 2023	March 21, 2023									
9	Wilkins v. United States, 598 U.S. 152	November 30, 2022	March 28, 2023									
10	Axon Enterprise, Inc. v. Federal Trade Commission, 598 U.S. 175	November 7, 2022	April 14, 2023		1				2			
11	New York v. New Jersey, 598 U.S. 218	March 1, 2023	April 18, 2023									
12	Reed v. Goertz, 598 U.S. 230	October 11, 2022	April 19, 2023		1	2			2			
13	Türkiye Halk Bankası A.Ş. v. United States, 598 U.S. 264	January 17, 2023	April 19, 2023									
14	MOAC Mall Holdings LLC v. Transform Holdco LLC, 598 U.S. 288	December 5, 2022	April 19, 2023									
15	Ciminelli v. United States, 598 U.S. 306	November 28, 2022	May 11, 2023									
16	Percoco v. United States, 598 U.S. 319	November 28, 2022	May 11, 2023									*
17	Financial Oversight and Management Board for Puerto Rico v. Centro de Periodismo Investigativo, Inc., 598 U.S. 339	January 11, 2023	May 11, 2023									
18	National Pork Producers Council v. Ross, 598 U.S. 356	October 11, 2022	May 11, 2023	1		1	* / 1	* / 1	*	1 / 2	* / 2	1
19	Santos-Zacaria v. Garland, 598 U.S. 411	January 17, 2023	May 11, 2023									
20	Polselli v. Internal Revenue Service, 598 U.S. 432	March 29, 2023	May 18, 2023									
21	Ohio Adjutant General's Department v. Federal Labor Relations Authority, 598 U.S. 449	January 9, 2023	May 18, 2023									
22	Twitter, Inc. v. Taamneh, 598 U.S. 471	February 22, 2023	May 18, 2023									
23	Andy Warhol Foundation for the Visual Arts, Inc. v. Goldsmith, 598 U.S. 508	October 12, 2022	May 18, 2023									
24	Amgen Inc. v. Sanofi, 598 U.S. 594	March 27, 2023	May 18, 2023									
25	Gonzalez v. Google LLC, 598 U.S. 617	February 21, 2023	May 18, 2023									
26	Calcutt v. FDIC, 598 U.S. 623	Not argued	May 22, 2023									
27	Tyler v. Hennepin County, 598 U.S. 631	April 26, 2023	May 25, 2023									
28	Sackett v. EPA, 598 U.S. 651	October 3, 2022	May 25, 2023		1		2 / 3	2 / 3	1	3		2 / 3
29	Dupree v. Younger, 598 U.S. 729	April 24, 2023	May 25, 2023									
30	United States ex rel. Schutte v. Supervalu Inc., 598 U.S. 739	April 18, 2023	June 1, 2023									
31	Slack Technologies, LLC v. Pirani, 598 U.S. 759	April 17, 2023	June 1, 2023									
32	Glacier Northwest, Inc. v. Teamsters, 598 U.S. 771	January 10, 2023	June 1, 2023		1 / 2	2			1 / 2			
33	Allen v. Milligan, 599 U.S. 1	October 4, 2022	June 8, 2023	*	1	1* / 2			1 / 2	*	1*	
34	Dubin v. United States, 599 U.S. 110	February 27, 2023	June 8, 2023									
35	Jack Daniel's Properties, Inc. v. VIP Products LLC, 599 U.S. 140	March 22, 2023	June 8, 2023		2	1	1		2		2	
36	Health and Hospital Corporation of Marion County v. Talevski, 599 U.S. 166	November 8, 2022	June 8, 2023	2	1 / 2	2			1		2	
37	Smith v. United States, 599 U.S. 236	March 28, 2023	June 15, 2023									
38	Haaland v. Brackeen, 599 U.S. 255	November 9, 2022	June 15, 2023		1	2	1*		1	2		1*
39	Lac du Flambeau Band of Lake Superior Chippewa Indians v. Coughlin, 599 U.S. 382	April 24, 2023	June 15, 2023									
40	United States ex rel. Polansky v. Executive Health Resources, Inc., 599 U.S. 419	December 6, 2022	June 16, 2023									
41	Lora v. United States, 599 U.S. 453	March 28, 2023	June 16, 2023									
42	Jones v. Hendrix, 599 U.S. 465	November 1, 2022	June 22, 2023				1	1				2
43	Yegiazaryan v. Smagin, 599 U.S. 533	April 25, 2023	June 22, 2023						*			
44	Arizona v. Navajo Nation, 599 U.S. 555	March 20, 2023	June 22, 2023									
45	Pugin v. Garland, 599 U.S. 600	April 17, 2023	June 22, 2023					*				
46	Samia v. United States, 599 U.S. 635	March 29, 2023	June 23, 2023				1	1			*	1 / 2
47	United States v. Texas, 599 U.S. 670	November 29, 2022	June 23, 2023		1				1 / 2		1 / 2	
48	Coinbase, Inc. v. Bielski, 599 U.S. 736	March 21, 2023	June 23, 2023		*							
49	United States v. Hansen, 599 U.S. 762	March 27, 2023	June 23, 2023									
50	Moore v. Harper, 600 U.S. 1	December 7, 2022	June 27, 2023			*						
51	Counterman v. Colorado, 600 U.S. 66	April 19, 2023	June 27, 2023		1 / 2				*		2	
52	Mallory v. Norfolk Southern Railway Co., 600 U.S. 122	November 8, 2022	June 27, 2023			* / 2			*			1
53	Students for Fair Admissions, Inc. v. President and Fellows of Harvard College, 600 U.S. 181	October 31, 2022	June 29, 2023		1 / 2		1 / 2	1 / 2	2	3		1* / 2
54	Abitron Austria GmbH v. Hetronic International, Inc., 600 U.S. 412	March 21, 2023	June 29, 2023	2			2	2			2	1
55	Groff v. DeJoy, 600 U.S. 447	April 18, 2023	June 29, 2023									
56	Biden v. Nebraska, 600 U.S. 477	February 28, 2023	June 30, 2023									
57	Department of Education v. Brown, 600 U.S. 551	February 28, 2023	June 30, 2023									
58	303 Creative LLC v. Elenis, 600 U.S. 570	December 5, 2022	June 30, 2023									
#	Case name and citation	Argued	Decided	Roberts	Thomas	Alito	Sotomayor	Kagan	Gorsuch	Kavanaugh	Barrett	Jackson

== 2022 term membership and statistics ==
This was the eighteenth term of Chief Justice Roberts's tenure and the first term for Justice Jackson.

Justice		Appointment history		Agreement with judgment		Opinions filed				
Seniority	Name	President	Date confirmed	%	#					Total
Chief Justice	John Roberts	George W. Bush	September 29, 2005	93.1%	54/58	6	0	1	0	7
Associate Justice	Clarence Thomas	George H. W. Bush	October 15, 1991	77.6%	45/58	6	7	0	9	22
Associate Justice	Samuel Alito	George W. Bush	January 31, 2006	77.6%	45/58	6	4	0	7	17
Associate Justice	Sonia Sotomayor	Barack Obama	August 6, 2009	82.8%	48/58	5	6	0	4	15
Associate Justice	Elena Kagan	Barack Obama	August 7, 2010	81%	47/58	6	1	0	4	11
Associate Justice	Neil Gorsuch	Donald Trump	April 7, 2017	81%	47/58	7	10	1	3	21
Associate Justice	Brett Kavanaugh	Donald Trump	October 6, 2018	94.8%	55/58	7	6	1	1	15
Associate Justice	Amy Coney Barrett	Donald Trump	October 26, 2020	91.4%	53/58	6	5	0	4	15
Associate Justice	Ketanji Brown Jackson	Joe Biden	April 7, 2022	82.8%	48/58	6	5	0	6	17
Notes on statistics: Opinion counts only include the bench opinions listed above; opinions relating to orders or in-chambers opinions are not included.; Agreement with the Court's judgment does not guarantee agreement with the reasoning expressed in its opinion. A justice is not considered in agreement if they dissented even in part. Agreement percentages are based only on the listed cases in which a justice participated and are rounded to the nearest one-tenth of one percentage point.; Individual opinion counts will not match the Court's totals; Sotomayor and Kagan's jointly authored dissent in Jones v. Hendrix is counted separately for both justices but counted only once in the Court's totals.						Totals				
						55	44	3	37	139
