= 2022 term per curiam opinions of the Supreme Court of the United States =

The Supreme Court of the United States handed down three per curiam opinions during its 2022 term, which began October 3, 2022 and concluded October 1, 2023.

Because per curiam decisions are issued from the Court as an institution, these opinions all lack the attribution of authorship or joining votes to specific justices. All justices on the Court at the time the decision was handed down are assumed to have participated and concurred unless otherwise noted.

== Court membership ==
Chief Justice: John Roberts

Associate Justices: Clarence Thomas, Samuel Alito, Sonia Sotomayor, Elena Kagan, Neil Gorsuch, Brett Kavanaugh, Amy Coney Barrett, Ketanji Brown Jackson

== Gonzalez v. Google LLC ==
- Full caption: Reynaldo Gonzalez, et al. v. Google LLC
- Citations: 598 U.S. 617
- Prior history: Gonzalez v. Google LLC, 2 F.4th 871 (9th Cir. 2021)
- Full text of the opinion: official slip opinion · Oyez

598 U.S. 617
Argued February 22, 2023.
Decided May 18, 2023.
In the wake of the November 2015 Paris attacks, the family of one of the victims sued Google, alleging that ISIS' use of YouTube (which is owned by Google) to spread their messages and recruit members violated the Justice Against Sponsors of Terrorism Act. The district court dismissed the case for failure to state a claim. The plaintiffs appealed to the Ninth Circuit Court of Appeals, which held that their claims were barred by Section 230 of the Communications Decency Act. Plaintiffs again appealed, and the United States Supreme Court granted certiorari. In light of their decision in Twitter, Inc. v. Taamneh, which also regarded JASTA and Section 230, the Supreme Court vacated and remanded this case for further proceedings.

== Calcutt v. FDIC ==
- Full caption: Hary C. Calcutt, III v. Federal Deposit Insurance Corporation
- Citations: 598 U.S. 623
- Full text of the opinion: official slip opinion · Oyez

598 U.S. 623
Decided May 22, 2023.
Harry C. Calcutt III was the CEO of Northwestern Bank during the Great Recession, when their relationship with one of their customers was allegedly mismanaged. The FDIC opened an investigation, and ordered him removed from his position, banned from further management positions with banks, and to pay a $125,000 fine. Calcutt appealed this decision to the Sixth Circuit Court of Appeals, which held that the FDIC had made two errors in their investigation of Calcutt. Instead of remanding the case to be re-investigated, the Sixth Circuit conducted their own review of the record and concluded that enough evidence existed to support the FDIC's conclusion. Calcutt appealed this decision to the United States Supreme Court, which held that the Sixth Circuit erred in conducting their own review of the facts of Calcutt's case. The Court revered the decision of the Sixth Circuit and remanded the case to the FDIC for re-investigation.

== See also ==
- List of United States Supreme Court cases, volume 598
