= Justice Against Sponsors of Terrorism Act =

US law vetoed by Obama but overridden

- Long title: An act to deter terrorism, provide justice for victims, and for other purposes.
- Enacted by: the 114th United States Congress

Citations
- Public law: Pub. L. 114–222 (text) (PDF)

Codification
- Acts amended: Foreign Sovereign Immunities Act; Anti-Terrorism and Effective Death Penalty Act of 1996

Legislative history
- Introduced in the Senate as S. 2040 by John Cornyn (R-TX) on September 16, 2015; Committee consideration by Senate Judiciary; Passed the Senate on May 17, 2016 (voice vote); Passed the House on September 9, 2016 (voice vote); Vetoed by President Barack Obama on September 23, 2016; Overridden by the Senate on September 28, 2016 (97–1); Overridden by the House of Representatives and became law on September 28, 2016 (348–77)

United States Supreme Court cases
- Twitter, Inc. v. Taamneh, No. 21-1496, 598 U.S. ___ (2023); Gonzalez v. Google LLC, No. 21-1333, 598 U.S. ___ (2023)

The Justice Against Sponsors of Terrorism Act (JASTA) (Pub. L. 114–222 (text) (PDF)) is a law enacted by the United States Congress that narrows the scope of the legal doctrine of foreign sovereign immunity, and establishes secondary liability for aiding and abetting in an act of international terrorism committed, planned, or authorized by a designated terrorist organization. It amends the Foreign Sovereign Immunities Act, the Anti-Terrorism Act, and the Anti-Terrorism and Effective Death Penalty Act in regard to civil claims against a foreign state for injuries, death, or damages from an act of international terrorism on U.S. soil.

The bill passed the Senate with no opposition in May 2016 and, in September 2016, was unanimously passed by the House of Representatives. On September 28, 2016, both houses of Congress passed the bill into law after overriding a veto from President Obama which had occurred five days earlier. This was the only presidential veto override of Obama's administration.

The practical effect of the legislation was to allow the continuation of a longstanding civil lawsuit brought by families of victims of the September 11 attacks against Saudi Arabia for its government's alleged role in the attacks, though the law does not mention Saudi Arabia by name. The legislation also enabled civil claims for "material support" and liability for acts of terrorism committed partially or entirely outside the United States that cause injury inside the United States, leading to a wide array of suits against private actors for aiding and abetting in international acts of terrorism that harmed United States citizens.

== Background: Legislative and doctrinal framework before JASTA ==
=== The Anti-Terrorism Act of 1987 ===
The U.S. Congress first provided for civil remedies for injuries stemming from international acts of terrorism in the Anti-Terrorism Act of 1987 (ATA). The Act, in its relevant parts, establishes that "[a]ny national of the United States injured in his or her person, property, or business by reason of an act of international terrorism, or his or her estate, survivors, or heirs, may sue therefor in any appropriate district court of the United States and shall recover threefold the damages he or she sustains and the cost of the suit, including attorney's fees."

=== Early litigation and the limits of primary liability ===
The first claims under this Act by private litigants generally targeted the foreign terrorist organizations that committed the acts of terrorism, as primarily liable for such. Given the difficulty of bringing foreign terrorist organizations to court, however, the chances of recovery for plaintiffs were low, even where default judgments were entered by the courts. To overcome this difficulty and to provide for higher chances of recovery, plaintiffs thus began bringing suit against different parties who allegedly aided and abetted those who committed international acts of terrorism. Multinational financial institutions were a primary target, against whom plaintiffs would typically bring suit alleging "substantial assistance" to foreign terrorist organizations through the provision of banking services and different financial tools.

=== Secondary liability and material support ===
Circuit courts were divided over whether the ATA provided for secondary liability claims. In Holder v. Humanitarian Law Project, the Supreme Court clarified that providing material support for organizations designated as foreign terrorist organizations was explicitly barred by the ATA, the PATRIOT Act, and 18 U.S.C. § 2339B ("providing material support for FTOs"), regardless of the use of such support. However, the Court did not clarify whether individuals or organizations found to provide such support could be held liable for furthering terrorism after the occurrence of an international act of terrorism.

=== Early judicial recognition of secondary liability ===
In 2002, the Seventh Circuit, in Boim I, first interpreted the existence of secondary liability under the ATA, finding that several humanitarian institutions could be found liable for aiding and abetting in international acts of terrorism where they funneled money to Hamas. The Second Circuit followed suit in Linde v. Arab Bank, PLC, where the court found that a bank providing services to a Hamas and Palestinian Islamic Jihad charity went beyond regular banking activities and could be found liable for providing substantial assistance to such organizations. Courts throughout the country applied the Boim I principle to find that secondary liability could be interpreted from the text of the statute.

=== The circuit split ===
However, six years later, in Boim III, the Seventh Circuit reversed itself, finding that no secondary liability could be interpreted from the ATA. In Rothstein v. UBS AG, the Second Circuit adopted the same positions, reversing its prior holding in Linde v. Arab Bank, PLC. Disregarding the reasoning in Boim III, in Wultz v. Islamic Republic of Iran, the D.C. Circuit found secondary liability could be established from the statutory language.

== Adoption of JASTA: Congressional support, Obama veto and override ==
=== Legislative background ===
In 2016, following a bipartisan initiative to amend the Foreign Sovereign Immunities Act and the ATA, Congress adopted JASTA. The lead sponsors of the legislation in the United States Senate were John Cornyn, Republican of Texas, and Chuck Schumer, Democrat of New York. The bill was originally introduced in December 2009, and was last reintroduced to the Senate on September 16, 2015, and passed by the Senate on May 17, 2016, by a voice vote. In the House of Representatives, the bill's lead sponsors were Representative Peter T. King, Republican of New York, and Representative Jerrold Nadler, Democrat of New York; the legislation had more than 50 cosponsors.

=== Scope and purpose ===
According to Senator Schumer, the initiative came in direct response to the "need to cut off the flow of money to terrorists by shutting down the reservoir-not just turning off the faucet." Senator Schumer further argued that JASTA would "restore the rights of the victims of terrorism," and "enabl[e] the victims of the September 11 Attack to proceed with their case, as Congress had intended." The Act established liability "to any person who aids and abets, by knowingly providing substantial assistance, or who conspires with the person who committed such an act of international terrorism," while limiting liability to individuals or organizations aiding and abetting designated foreign terrorist organizations. Through JASTA, Congress expanded the ATA and substantially changed the scope of liability, by formally establishing liability for aiding and abetting in international acts of terrorism.

=== Passage, veto, and override ===
White House Press Secretary Josh Earnest stated, shortly before the Senate voted on the legislation, that the White House was concerned that the JASTA could put the United States, its taxpayers, its service members, and its diplomats at "significant risk" if a similar law is to be adopted by other countries. On September 12, 2016, the bill unanimously passed the House of Representatives. On the same day the House passed the bill, Josh Earnest confirmed that President Obama was very likely to utilize his power to veto, which he did on September 23, 2016. An override requires a recorded vote of the positions of all lawmakers. On September 28, 2016, the Senate voted to override the veto with 97 senators voting in favor, with Senate Minority Leader Harry Reid being the sole no vote and with Senators Tim Kaine and Bernie Sanders not voting. The House followed suit later the same day, passing the bill into law over the president's objections by a 348–77 vote. The veto override was the only override during Obama's presidency.

== The Halberstam v. Welch framework ==
In adopting JASTA, Congress followed the seminal D.C. Circuit case on aiding and abetting liability in civil suits, Halberstam v. Welch. According to Halberstam, aiding and abetting liability includes the following 3 elements: (1) the party whom the defendant aids must perform a wrongful act that causes an injury; (2) the defendant must be generally aware of his role as part of an overall illegal or tortious activity at the time that he provides the assistance; and (3) the defendant must knowingly and substantially assist the principal violation.

As established by the D.C. Circuit in Halberstam, liability often turns on the third element, and specifically determining how much assistance constitutes "substantial assistance." To establish this element, and following the Restatement (Second) of Torts, the court provides six factors which may be considered: (1) the nature of the act encouraged; (2) the amount of assistance given by the defendant; (3) his presence or absence at the time of the tort; (4) his relation to the tortfeasor; (5) his state of mind; and (6) the duration of the assistance provided. The court further argued that foreseeability is not a hard line to establish liability for aiding and abetting torts.

== Predicted impact ==
=== United States–Saudi Arabia relationship ===
In the lead-up to the passage of JASTA, Saudi Arabia worked hard to oppose the legislation. When the bill was introduced, the Saudi government "threatened" to sell up to $750 billion in United States Treasury securities and other U.S. assets if the bill is passed. A number of independent economic analysts told the New York Times that Saudi Arabia would be unlikely to follow through on such threats, "saying that such a sell-off would be difficult to execute and would end up crippling the kingdom's economy". There is no evidence that the Saudis ever followed through on these threats.

An official at Saudi Arabia's Ministry of Foreign Affairs told the state-run Saudi Press Agency on September 29, 2016, that the U.S. Congress must correct the 9/11 bill to avoid "serious unintended consequences", adding the law is of "great concern" to the Kingdom.

=== Status of sovereign immunity ===
Scholars and practitioners of international law expressed concerns about JASTA. For example, John B. Bellinger III, former Legal Adviser of the Department of State warned that the bill could encourage other countries to enact measures that limit sovereign immunity, including that of the United States. Law professor Curtis Bradley at Duke University told ABC News that the bill could result in U.S. citizen lawsuits against potentially any country. Bradley also said that it could lead to legal response in other countries against U.S. activities such as drone strikes and military aid to Israel. Government attorney Joshua Claybourn argued in The American Spectator that international sovereign immunity benefits the United States more than other nations due to significant U.S. foreign activity — diplomatic, economic, and military. Moreover, Claybourn noted America's "relatively deep pockets also make the United States a particularly attractive target".

On September 30, 2016, the law went into effect when the first lawsuit was officially filed against the Kingdom of Saudi Arabia. Stephanie Ross DeSimone alleged the kingdom provided material support to al Qaeda and its leader, Osama bin Laden, in a complaint which was filed at a U.S. court in Washington, D.C. Her suit was also filed on behalf of the couple's daughter. DeSimone was two months pregnant when her husband, United States Navy Commander Patrick Dunn, was killed while working at the Pentagon during the September 11 attacks.

The new law was also expected to allow up to 9,000 plaintiffs from the New York area to sue Saudi Arabia as well. Soon after the law was passed, a group of lawyers stated that they expected that a federal judge would once again take up the cases originally filed in courtrooms across the U.S., but that several years ago were consolidated into one suit in the Southern District of New York.

== Lawsuit against Saudi Arabia under JASTA ==
On March 20, 2017, 1,500 injured survivors and 850 family members of 9/11 victims filed a lawsuit against the Kingdom of Saudi Arabia. Plaintiffs allege that the government of Saudi Arabia had prior knowledge that some of its officials and employees were al Qaeda operatives or sympathizers. The complaint alleged that Saudi Arabia "knowingly provided material support and resources to the al Qaeda terrorist organization and facilitating the September 11th Attacks".

On March 2, 2020, the plaintiff in the lawsuit filed a letter stating that potential witnesses have received numerous threats. Saudi Arabia is seeking to obtain the identity of all witnesses to the case.

== Judicial trend after JASTA ==
=== Judicial interpretation and the circuit split ===
Given Congress's authorization that JASTA may apply retroactively to cases already filed in federal courts, numerous plaintiffs took leave to amend their complaints to include a cause of action for aiding and abetting under JASTA. However, the courts' interpretation of JASTA and the Halberstam factors has led to limited liability under the amended statute. Varying interpretations of "substantial assistance" led to a Circuit split in where liability may be found under JASTA.

In Siegel v. HSBC N. Am. Holdings, Inc., the Second Circuit held that, in interpreting aiding and abetting liability under JASTA, it is necessary to apply theories that relate to principal liability under the ATA, meaning that the private actor must possess general awareness of their furtherance of violent or life-endangering activities, "knowingly providing substantial assistance." The court further interpreted the statute in Honickman v. BLOM Bank SAL, establishing that aiding and abetting requires more than the provision of material support to a designated terrorist organization to establish substantial assistance. The court also stated that "substantial assistance" does not require a direct relationship between the defendant and a foreign terrorist organization, or that the organization receive funds from the defendant. However, the court later in Freeman ex rel. est. Freeman v. HSBC Holdings PLC, clarified that a direct link between the defendant and the foreign terrorist organization was needed to establish liability under JASTA.

In Atchley v. AstraZeneca UK Ltd., the D.C. Circuit adopted a broader interpretation of JASTA, leading to one of few instances where a court has found liability under the Act. The Court has devised a "culpability" standard based on the "knowing and substantial assistance" element, which is measured based on both requirements working in tandem, to permit a court to infer conscious and culpable assistance, with a lesser showing of one demanding a greater showing of the other. The Court also rejected a "direct traceability" test, which would require the defendants to have known all the particulars of the primary actor's plan, placing foreseeability as the primary standard. The court has identified departure from generally accepted business practices as a basis for liability under JASTA.

The Ninth Circuit has adopted a broader standard to find liability for aiding and abetting international acts of terrorism under JASTA. In Gonzalez v. Google LLC, which consolidated three separate appeals arising from district court dismissals of claims under the ATA, including Twitter v. Taamneh, the court found plausible a claim that Twitter permitted the use of its platforms for the promotion of ISIS propaganda, even with extensive media coverage and complaints. Given how integral Twitter, YouTube, and Google were to ISIS operations, and the requirement of foreseeability to establish general awareness, as well as knowingly providing substantial assistance, the court found that liability could be found, and remanded the case.

=== The Supreme Court's clarification ===
In Twitter v. Taamneh, the Supreme Court sought to provide more clarity in this area of law by addressing the knowledge requirement and establishing the meaning of "substantial assistance" as understood under Halberstam v. Welch, the two main points of contention.

== Supreme Court interpretation in Twitter v. Taamneh ==
See also: Twitter, Inc. v. Taamneh; Gonzalez v. Google LLC; BLOM Bank SAL v. Honickman.

=== The knowledge and substantial assistance requirements ===
Twitter v. Taamneh (2023) was the first time the Supreme Court directly addressed JASTA's aiding and abetting provision. The Court granted certiorari specifically to decide whether the use of services available to the public at large and unconnected to the specific attack itself could support JASTA liability.

In the case, the court held that the Halberstam factors should be understood "in light of the common law and applied as a framework designed to hold defendants liable when they consciously and culpably participated in a tortious act in such a way as to help make it succeed." To provide for secondary liability under JASTA, the Court determined it is necessary for there to be a nexus between the aider or abettor's acts and the specific attack under which suit is brought.

The Court further emphasized the need for foreign terrorist organization designation for secondary liability to potentially carry. Similarly, the Court determined the need to meet the ATA requirement of injury "by reason of" an international act of terrorism.

In sum, the Court stated that for secondary liability for aiding and abetting in international acts of terrorism to be attached to a defendant's actions under JASTA, the plaintiff must prove conscious, voluntary and culpable participation in another's wrongdoing, satisfying the following elements: (1) the defendant knowingly assisted the specific act, with general awareness of links or assistance to a foreign terrorist organization being insufficient; (2) the defendant provided substantial assistance, with passive, neutral, or algorithmic services available to all users being insufficient; and (3) the defendant had a culpable mental state tied to the actual attack, with a direct and concrete nexus between the defendant's conduct and the specific terrorist act at issue.

=== Subsequent developments ===
The Supreme Court revisited JASTA in 2025, in BLOM Bank SAL v. Honickman. There, the Court limited the possibility of relief from judgment under Federal Rule of Civil Procedure (FRCP) 60(b), requiring extraordinary circumstances to be proved for relief to be granted, replacing the more liberal approach of leave to amend under FRCP 15(a). The Court has since not revisited the statute.

== See also ==
- Alleged Saudi role in the September 11 attacks
- 9/11 Commission Report
- The 28 pages
- Foreign Sovereign Immunities Act
- Anti-Terrorism Act of 1987
- Twitter, Inc. v. Taamneh
- Gonzalez v. Google LLC
- BLOM Bank SAL v. Honickman
