= Delaware v. Pennsylvania =

U.S. Supreme Court case from 2023

- Supreme Court of the United States

Argued October 3, 2022 Decided February 28, 2023
- Full case name: Delaware v. Pennsylvania and Wisconsin
- Docket no.: 22O145
- Citations: 598 U.S. 115 (more)
- Argument: Oral argument
- Opinion announcement: Opinion announcement

Holding
- Unclaimed MoneyGram payments constitute "money orders" or "similar written instruments" subject to escheatment under the Federal Disposition Act, 12 U.S.C. § 2503.

Court membership
- Chief Justice John Roberts Associate Justices Clarence Thomas · Samuel Alito; Sonia Sotomayor · Elena Kagan; Neil Gorsuch · Brett Kavanaugh; Amy Coney Barrett · Ketanji Brown Jackson

Case opinion
- Majority: Jackson, joined by unanimous (Parts I, II, III, and IV–A); Roberts, Sotomayor, Kagan, Kavanaugh (Part IV–B)

Laws applied
- Disposition of Abandoned Money Orders and Travelers Check Act (Federal Disposition Act or FDA) 12 U.S.C. § 2503

Delaware v. Pennsylvania, 598 U.S. 115 (2023), was a United States Supreme Court case related to unclaimed money and check escheatment. This case was Justice Ketanji Brown Jackson's first majority opinion on the Supreme Court. It was also the first case the Supreme Court had taken on unclaimed property in over 30 years.

== Background ==
States are entitled to take custody of abandoned personal property through escheatment. MoneyGram reports that hundreds of millions of dollars in abandoned funds are in dispute, with more than $500 million in dispute in recent years. The state of Delaware used the escheatment of "assets like bank and brokerage accounts, unclaimed life insurance policies, uncashed paychecks, traveler's checks, and gift cards" as a source of the state's revenue. It was Delaware's third-largest source of revenue, representing 10% of incoming funds. Delaware is home to over 2 million businesses.

Multiple states filed suit to petition the Supreme Court to resolve a dispute between the states regarding whether abandoned proceeds are subject to the Disposition of Abandoned Money Orders and Travelers Check Act (Federal Disposition Act or FDA), 12 U.S.C. § 2503.

MoneyGram is a Delaware corporation that provides prepaid financial instruments that are sold to consumers to pay their own obligations. MoneyGram International, Inc. is the second-largest money transfer business in the world, with revenues of over $1 billion. MoneyGram sells two products: "Official Checks" and "Retail Money Orders". The retail money orders are not the instrument in dispute in this case. Images of the disputed items can be viewed in the two affidavits from Jennifer Whitlock, head of global supply chain for MoneyGram.

There are two types of MoneyGram "official checks": "Agent Checks" and "Teller's Check" These checks are sold only by financial institution banks and credit unions. They are not sold at retail locations.

Many large companies in the United States incorporate in Delaware for the legal and tax protections that the state offers.

Delaware sought to have this issue be a matter of common law, rather than the Federal Disposition Act covers disputed instruments in dispute. The rules came from the case of Texas v. New Jersey, 379 U.S. 674, 675 (1965).

== Supreme Court of the United States Special Master ==
On May 26, 2016, a motion was filed for leave to file a bill of complaint. The special master heard oral arguments on the case on March 10, 2021.

=== First Interim Order ===
The Supreme Court appointed special master Pierre N. Leval to the case. On July 23, 2021, the special master issued the First Interim Report, ruling that disputed instruments are covered by the Federal Disposition Act. Leval split the case into two parts: a liability and a damage phase.

There are two ways laws that the special master was asked consider: the Disposition of Abandoned Money Orders and Travelers Check Act (Federal Disposition Act or FDA) 12 U.S.C. § 2503, and the federal common law rule in which debts left unclaimed by creditors would escheat "to the State of the Creditor's last known address as shown by the debtor's books and records."

MoneyGram's two instruments, "Agent Checks" and "Teller's Checks", are the case's disputed instruments. If the common law related to escheatment applies to the disputed instruments, the abandoned property escheats to the state of incorporation. However, if the FDA applies, the abandoned property goes to the state of purchase.

The special master covered the historical precedent of escheatment. Under English common law, all land titles and property originated from the Crown. "[T]he process by which tenurial land returned to the lord of the fee upon the occurrence of an event obstructing the normal course of descent."

Under American law, escheatment has been justified under the public policy that unclaimed and abandoned assets should be "used for the general good rather than for the chance enrichment of particular individuals or organizations", per Standard Oil Co. v. New Jersey 341 U.S. 428, 436 (1951).

The special master then evaluated the Uniform Disposition of Unclaimed Property Act, drafted by the Uniform Law Commission, first published in 1954. The act was not universally adopted and did not resolve claims between the states. The revised Uniform Disposition of Unclaimed Property Act, published in 1966, included "money orders and traveler's checks". However, the act did not define these terms.

The FDA applies only to money payable on "a money order, traveler's check, or other similar written instruments (excluding third-party bank check).

The special master highlighted the congressional findings in the FDA that noted:

"(1) the books and records of banking and financial organizations and business associations engaged in issuing and selling money orders and traveler’s checks do not, as a matter of business practice, show the last known addresses of purchasers of such instruments;

(2) a substantial majority of such purchasers reside in the states where such instruments are purchased;

(3) the states wherein the purchasers of money orders and traveler’s checks reside should, as a matter of equity among the several states, be entitled to the proceeds of such instruments in the event of abandonment;"

— 12 U.S.C. § 2501(1)–(3).

=== Second Interim Order ===
The special master held oral arguments on December 8, 2022. On December 13, 2022, he issued a Second Interim Report, in which the special master issued an apology to the Supreme Court, stating: "Upon reading the arguments before the Supreme Court and returning to the record in the case, I can no longer subscribe to the entirety of the recommendations I made to the Supreme Court."

The special master stated that he read the oral arguments before the Supreme Court, where he felt that Delaware was "emphasizing a circumstance that, if correct, would distinguish between rights and obligations, at least comparing the disputed instruments with those that MoneyGram labels as 'money orders.'" The special master notified the court clerk and ordered an expedited briefing. After briefing and oral arguments, the special master revised his recommendation to the court.

The special master concluded that the disputed instruments did fall in the category of "other similar written instruments", but were not "money orders". However, because some of the disputed instruments are drawn by a bank, they fell within the exclusion of the "third-party bank checks". FDA 12 U.S.C. 2503.

== Delaware exception to the Supreme Court of the United States Special Master ruling ==
Once the special master's First Interim Report concluded that the disputed instruments were covered under the FDA, Delaware filed an exception.

The court accepted briefs and oral arguments, then the special master announced that the proceedings before the court had caused him to "reassess his conclusion". He subsequently issued a Second Interim Report, which concluded that many of the disputed instruments were or could be "third-party bank check[s]" and would thereby be "excluded from the FDA".

The special master recommended to the Supreme Court that any of the "Disputed Instruments that are checks issued by banks as drawers (on which banks are thus liable) are 'third party bank checks,' which are excluded from the scope of the 'other similar written instrument' clause and from the disposition of the act."

The special master concluded the Teller's Checks marked by MoneyGram are, indeed, teller's checks. However, the "so labeled Agent Checks" and "unlabeled Agent Checks" are not drawers.

== Supreme Court of the United States ==
The court held that the disputed instruments are "sufficiently similar" to money orders to fall under the FDA. The court did not decide whether the disputed instruments are" money orders. The court ruled that they were similar to money orders under 12 U.S.C. 2503. They fall into the FDA's "other similar written instrument" category.

The Supreme Court's opinion addresses the first phase of the bifurcated process from the special master's liability phases. The Court left the special master to decide the damages in the second phase.

The court looked at the common-law it created by the court's own case law of two rules.

According to the primary rule (default), the proceeds of abandoned financial produce should escheat "to the State of the creditor's last known address as shown by the debtor's books." The secondary rule did not resolve the question of escheatment when the creditors' addresses were unknown or because the state did not have a law allowing escheatment. Thus, the secondary rule served to allow the abandoned property to default to the state of incorporation.

The court acknowledged that it created the default rule to escheat to the state of the creditor's last known address because it "tend[ed] to distribute escheats among States in the proportion of the commercial activities of their residents." The court acknowledged that the regulations it had established were leading to an uneven distribution of benefits among certain financial instruments. It specifically drew attention to Western Union's failure to maintain records of the addresses of consumers who purchased its financial products.

The court discussed the case of Pennsylvania v. New York, 407 U. S. 206 (1972). In this case, Pennsylvania asked for the Supreme Court to change its rules for escheatment because it was creating an unfair "windfall" to states where money orders are purchased, moving money to the state of New York. In the Pennsylvania case, the court refused to change its rule for escheatment.

In a direct response to the court's holding in Pennsylvania v. New York, Congress created a more equitable rule and passed the FDA. Congress stated "as a matter of equity among the several States", the states “wherein the purchasers of money orders and traveler's checks reside should ... be entitled to the proceeds of such instruments in the event of abandonment" § 2501(3).

Both Congress and the court recognized that the common-law rules the court established were failing to achieve an equitable distribution of resources among the states. "A variety of dictionary definitions contemporaneous with the Act's passage universally define a 'money order' as a prepaid financial instrument used to transmit a specified amount of money to a named payee. And this Court's common-law precedents—the backdrop against which the FDA was enacted—are in accord with that definition."

The court noted that the FDA was passed to change the court's prior common-law rule on the escheatment of these instruments. The court went on to note one reason that the FDA was passed was to "prevent [...] a 'windfall' to the State of incorporation by instead adopting a place-of-purchase escheatment rule." This was done as a matter of equity between the states.

The court dismissed Delaware's argument that the special master's reading and the court's view of section 2503 would "creat[e] surplusage and [sweep] in all sorts of unintended financial product ... [would] go too far."

The court looked at Delaware and the special master's view that "even if the Disputed Instruments qualify as 'other similar written instrument[s]' under the FDA, they are also 'third party bank check[s],' which are expressly excluded from the FDA." However, the court noted that the FDA does not define the term "third-party bank check", nor does it have a commonly accepted meaning.

=== Section IV B ===
The majority opinion held that nothing in the legislature's history supported Delaware's view that the disputed instruments were "third-party bank checks". The court acknowledged that the term "third-party bank check" has "myriad alternative definitions and is generally unknown".

The court considered the view of the letter the Treasury Department sent to Congress about the bill. The letter warned that the proposed wording of the FDA before its passage could be interpreted to cover "third-party payment bank checks", so the Treasury recommended excluding "third-party payment bank checks from the FDA". Congress adopted this recommendation. The court also considered the statements of committee chair Senator Sparkman, who reviewed the addition of the "third-party payment bank check" exclusion as a "minor" change.

The court held that, based on the history and text of the FDA, "it would be strange to interpret the 'third party bank check' language to exempt from the statute entire swaths of prepaid financial instruments that are otherwise similar to money orders in that they operate in generally the same fashion and would likewise escheat inequitably pursuant to the common law due to the business practice of company holding the funds."

The court adopted the special master's First Interim Report and the proposed order, overruling Delaware's exception to the First Interim Report, before returning it to the special master.

== Reaction and aftermath ==
Pennsylvania Treasurer Stacy Garrity believes that Delaware may owe up to $400 million to the plaintiff states as a result of the court's ruling.

This ruling means that Pennsylvania residents will have a real opportunity to reclaim millions of dollars in unclaimed property. The Supreme Court rejected Delaware's attempt to gain an unfair windfall and struck a strong blow in favor of consumers. I'm eager to get to the business of returning this money to the hardworking people it rightfully belongs to.

— Pennsylvania State Treasurer Stacy Garrity.

The case now returns to the special master for the second part of the bifurcated action to assess damages.
