= Ingersoll-Rand Co. v. McClendon =

- Supreme Court of the United States

Argued October 9, 1990 Decided December 3, 1990
- Full case name: Ingersoll-Rand Company v. McClendon
- Citations: 498 U.S. 133 (more) 111 S. Ct. 478; 112 L. Ed. 2d 474

Court membership
- Chief Justice William Rehnquist Associate Justices Byron White · Thurgood Marshall; Harry Blackmun · John P. Stevens; Sandra Day O'Connor · Antonin Scalia; Anthony Kennedy · David Souter

Case opinion
- Majority: O'Connor, joined by unanimous (parts I and II-B); Rehnquist, White, Scalia, Kennedy, Souter (part II-A)

Laws applied
- Employee Retirement Income Security Act of 1974, 29 U.S.C. § 1001 et seq.

Ingersoll-Rand Co. v. McClendon, 498 U.S. 133 (1990), is a US labor law case, concerning the scope of labor rights in the United States.

== Facts ==
Mr. McClendon claimed his job was terminated to prevent his pension benefits from "vesting" (full rights becoming irrevocable if the employment contract ended) under the Employee Retirement Income Security Act of 1974. He argued this violated Texas state law public policy and sought damages for wrongful termination, mental anguish, including punitive damages. He sought to avoid a question of preemption of his claim by ERISA 1974 §514(a), by not claiming lost pension benefits, or referring to pension plan details, and instead basing a claim solely upon state law.

The Texas Courts held that he had a claim.

== Judgment ==
Justice O’Connor held that Mr McClendon’s claim was pre-empted. The Texas public policy ‘referred to’ a pension plan, to protect its integrity against employer misconduct. The state action would also be preempted by implication as it conflicted potentially by the anti-discrimination provisions of ERISA (29 USC §1140).

O'Connor J said the following, with which the whole court concurred.

B

Even if there were no express pre-emption in this case, the Texas cause of action would be pre-empted because it conflicts directly with an ERISA cause of action. McClendon's claim falls squarely within the ambit of ERISA § 510, which provides:

"It shall be unlawful for any person to discharge, fine, suspend, expel, discipline, or discriminate against a participant or beneficiary for exercising any right to which he is entitled under the provisions of an employee benefit plan . . . or for the purpose of interfering with the attain- ment of any right to which such participant may become entitled under the plan. . . ." 29 U.S.C. § 1140 (emphasis added).

By its terms § 510 protects plan participants from termination motivated by an employer's desire to prevent a pension from vesting. Congress viewed this section as a crucial part of ERISA because, without it, employers would be able to circumvent the provision of promised benefits. S.Rep. No. 93-127, pp. 35-36 (1973); H.R.Rep. No. 93-533, p. 17 (1973). We have no doubt that this claim is prototypical of the kind Congress intended to cover under § 510.

This meant, in the court's view, that a civil action under §502(a) - not including punitive damages, potentially available in state law - was the only available remedy.

In addition, Justice O'Connor offered an opinion that McClelland's claim was preempted in general. Justice Rehnquist, Justice White, Justice Scalia, Justice Kennedy, Justice Souter joined. Justice Marshall, Justice Blackmun and Justice Stevens offered no view.

A

[...]

The key to § 514(a) is found in the words "relate to." Congress used those words in their broad sense, rejecting more limited pre-emption language that would have made the clause "applicable only to state laws relating to the specific subjects covered by ERISA." Shaw, supra, 463 U.S., at 98, 103 S.Ct., at 2900-01. Moreover, to underscore its intent that § 514(a) be expansively applied, Congress used equally broad language in defining the "State law" that would be pre-empted. Such laws include "all laws, decisions, rules, regulations, or other State action having the effect of law." § 514(c)(1), 29 U.S.C. § 1144(c)(1).

"A law 'relates to' an employee benefit plan, in the normal sense of the phrase, if it has a connection with or reference to such a plan." Shaw, supra, at 96-97, 103 S.Ct., at 2900. Under this "broad common-sense meaning," a state law may "relate to" a benefit plan, and thereby be pre-empted, even if the law is not specifically designed to affect such plans, or the effect is only indirect. Pilot Life, supra, 481 U.S., at 47, 107 S.Ct., at 1552-53. See also Alessi v. Raybestos-Manhattan, Inc., supra, 451 U.S., at 525, 101 S.Ct., at 1907. Pre-emption is also not precluded simply because a state law is consistent with ERISA's substantive requirements. Metropolitan Life Ins. Co. v. Massachusetts, [1985] USSC 140; 471 U.S. 724, 739[1985] USSC 140; 105 S.Ct. 2380, 2388-89[1985] USSC 140; 85 L.Ed.2d 728 (1985).

Notwithstanding its breadth, we have recognized limits to ERISA's pre-emption clause. In Mackey v. Lanier Collection Agency & Service, Inc., 486 U.S. 825, 108 S.Ct. 2182, 100 L.Ed.2d 836 (1988), the Court held that ERISA did not pre-empt a State's general garnishment statute, even though it was applied to collect judgments against plan participants. Id., at 841, 108 S.Ct., at 2191. The fact that collection might burden the administration of a plan did not, by itself, compel pre-emption. Moreover, under the plain language of § 514(a) the Court has held that only state laws that relate to benefit plans are pre-empted. Fort Halifax Packing Co. v. Coyne, 482 U.S. 1, 23[1987] USSC 99; 107 S.Ct. 2211, 2223-24[1987] USSC 99; 96 L.Ed.2d 1 (1987). Thus, even though a state law required payment of severance benefits, which would normally fall within the purview of ERISA, it was not pre-empted because the statute did not require the establishment or maintenance of an ongoing plan. Id., at 12, 107 S.Ct., at 2217-18.

Neither of these limitations is applicable to this case. We are not dealing here with a generally applicable statute that makes no reference to, or indeed functions irrespective of, the existence of an ERISA plan. Nor is the cost of defending this lawsuit a mere administrative burden. Here, the existence of a pension plan is a critical factor in establishing liability under the State's wrongful discharge law. As a result, this cause of action relates not merely to pension benefits, but to the essence of the pension plan itself.

We have no difficulty in concluding that the cause of action which the Texas Supreme Court recognized here—a claim that the employer wrongfully terminated plaintiff primarily because of the employer's desire to avoid contributing to, or paying benefits under, the employee's pension fund—"relate[s] to" an ERISA-covered plan within the meaning of § 514(a), and is therefore pre-empted.

[...]

McClendon argues that § 514(c)(2)'s limiting language causes § 514(a) to pre-empt only those state laws that affect plan terms, conditions, or administration. Since the cause of action recognized by the Texas court does not focus on those items but rather on the employer's termination decision, McClendon claims that there can be no pre-emption here.

The flaw in this argument is that it misreads § 514(c)(2) and consequently misapprehends its purpose. The ERISA definition of "State" is found in § 3(10), which defines the term as "any State of the United States, the District of Columbia, Puerto Rico, the Virgin Islands, American Samoa, Guam, Wake Island, and the Canal Zone." 29 U.S.C. § 1002(10). Section 514(c)(2) expands, rather than restricts, that definition for pre-emption purposes in order to "include " state agencies and instrumentalities whose actions might not otherwise be considered state law. Had Congress intended to restrict ERISA's pre-emptive effect to state laws purporting to regulate plan terms and conditions, it surely would not have done so by placing the restriction in an adjunct definition section while using the broad phrase "relate to" in the pre-emption section itself.

[...]

The conclusion that the cause of action in this case is pre-empted by § 514(a) is supported by our understanding of the purposes of that provision. Section 514(a) was intended to ensure that plans and plan sponsors would be subject to a uniform body of benefits law; the goal was to minimize the administrative and financial burden of complying with conflicting directives among States or between States and the Federal Government. Otherwise, the inefficiencies created could work to the detriment of plan beneficiaries.
