= United States v. R. Enterprises, Inc. =

United States v. R. Enterprises
- Supreme Court of the United States

Argued October 29, 1990 Decided January 22, 1991
- Full case name: United States v. R. Enterprises
- Citations: 498 U.S. 292 (more) 111 S. Ct. 722; 112 L. Ed. 2d 795; 1991 U.S. LEXIS 489

Holding
- When a grand jury subpoena is challenged on relevancy grounds, the motion to quash must be denied unless the district court determines that there is no reasonable possibility that the materials sought will produce information relevant to the grand jury's investigation.

Court membership
- Chief Justice William Rehnquist Associate Justices Byron White · Thurgood Marshall; Harry Blackmun · John P. Stevens; Sandra Day O'Connor · Antonin Scalia; Anthony Kennedy · David Souter

Case opinions
- Majority: O'Connor, joined by unanimous (Parts I, II); Rehnquist, White, Scalia, Kennedy, Souter (Parts III-A, IV); Rehnquist, White, Kennedy, Souter (Part III-B)
- Concurrence: Stevens (in part), joined by Marshall, Blackmun

United States v. R. Enterprises, Inc., 498 U.S. 292 (1991), was a United States Supreme Court case in which the court held that the three prong test for the issuance of a subpoena in United States v. Nixon does not apply to subpoenas issued by a grand jury. The Court concluded by stating that when a grand jury subpoena is challenged on relevancy grounds, the motion to quash must be denied "unless the district court determines that there is no reasonable possibility that the materials sought will produce information relevant to the grand jury's investigation."

== Case background ==
A federal grand jury was investigating the shipment of pornographic materials from the state of New York into Virginia.

R. Enterprises, Inc. (a pornographic distributor) filed a motion to quash the grand jury subpoenas duces tecum (document production orders). The judge of the United States District Court for the Eastern District of Virginia denied the defendant's motion to quash. Nevertheless, the United States Court of Appeals for the Fourth Circuit reversed the District Court's decision.

== Holding ==
The Supreme Court held that the trial standard of United States v. Nixon doesn't apply to grand juries.
