= BLOM Bank SAL v. Honickman =

- Supreme Court of the United States

Argued March 3, 2025
- Full case name: BLOM Bank SAL v. Michal Honickman, et al.
- Docket no.: 23-1259

Case history
- Prior: Summary judgment for the defendant, Honickman, et al. v. BLOM Bank SAL, No. 19CV-00008-KAM-SMG (E.D. New York, January 15, 2020). Affirmed, No. 20-575 (2d Cir.). Denied motion to vacate (E.D. New York, April 8, 2022). District Court's judgment vacated and remanded, February 29, 2024, No. 22-1039 (2d Cir.).

Questions presented
- Does Federal Rule of Civil Procedure 60(b)(6)’s stringent standard apply to a post-judgment request to vacate for the purpose of filing an amended complaint?

Holding
- Relief under Rule 60(b)(6) requires extraordinary circumstances, and this standard does not become less demanding when the movant seeks to reopen a case to amend a complaint. A party must first satisfy Rule 60(b) before Rule 15(a)'s liberal amendment standard can apply.

Court membership
- Chief Justice John Roberts Associate Justices Clarence Thomas · Samuel Alito; Sonia Sotomayor · Elena Kagan; Neil Gorsuch · Brett Kavanaugh; Amy Coney Barrett · Ketanji Brown Jackson

Case opinions
- Majority: Thomas, joined by Roberts, Alito, Sotomayor, Kagan, Gorsuch, Kavanaugh, and Barrett; Jackson (except Part III)
- Concur/dissent: Jackson

Laws applied
- Federal Rules of Civil Procedure

BLOM Bank SAL v. Honickman, 605 U.S. 204 (2025), is a Supreme Court of the United States case in which the court held that relief under Rule 60(b)(6) of the Federal Rules of Civil Procedure requires extraordinary circumstances, and this standard does not become less demanding when the movant seeks to reopen a case to amend a complaint. A party must first satisfy Rule 60(b) before Rule 15(a)'s liberal amendment standard can apply.

== Parties ==
The petitioner, BLOM Bank SAL, is one of the largest banking firms in Lebanon. Founded as the Banque du Liban et D’Outre Mer in 1951, it is today headquartered in Beirut and its securities are traded on the Beirut Stock Exchange.

The respondents are victims and family of victims of terrorist activity perpetrated by Hamas. In 2019, they filed a complaint against BLOM Bank accusing the bank of knowingly providing financial services to Hamas and its affiliates such that the bank had aided and abetted Hamas in carrying out acts of terrorism. Specifically, the respondents alleged in their complaint that BLOM Bank had provided services to organizations that fundraised for Hamas such as Sanabil, the Holy Land Foundation, and the Union of Good.

== Procedural history ==
On January 1, 2019, a complaint was filed in the Eastern District of New York by victims and family of victims of a series of terror attacks perpetrated by Hamas between 2001 and 2003. These plaintiffs alleged a cause of action against BLOM Bank for having aided and abetted Hamas in its terrorist activity. They did so under the auspices of the Anti-Terrorism and Effective Death Penalty Act and the Justice Against Sponsors of Terrorism Act (18 U.S.C. § 2333). These allow for plaintiffs to seek civil remedy from US courts against those who conspire with or materially support terrorist organizations for damages suffered pursuant to the commission of acts of terrorism. The district court dismissed the case on a motion from BLOM Bank for failure to state plausibly that the bank was aware of affiliations with Hamas of its clients.

The dismissal was appealed to the Second Circuit Court of Appeals. There, the court agreed with the dismissal, but disagreed with its application of the standards for aiding and abetting under 18 U.S.C. § 2333(d)(2). From there, the respondents returned to the district court, where they moved to vacate the dismissal and amend their pleading. This was denied by the district court and the respondents once again appealed to the Second Circuit.

Upon this second arrival at the Second Circuit, the court reversed and remanded the matter back to the district court. The Second Circuit stated that "the district court exceeded its discretion by basing its ruling on an erroneous view of the law because it failed to balance Rule 60(b)(6)’s finality principles and Rule 15(a)’s liberal pleading principles." This was in keeping with the Second Circuit's earlier ruling in Mandala v. NTT Data, Inc., issued in December, 2023. The Mandala case saw the Second Circuit first give firm support to this practice of balancing competing interests found between Rule 60(b)(6) and Rule 15(a). The Second Circuit's holding in Mandala thus created a "circuit split", an incongruity in a reading of the law between the different federal appellate circuits.

The resolution of disparities like the above-described circuit split is one of the primary functions of the Supreme Court's judicial review. BLOM Bank filed a Petition for Writ of Certiorari with the Supreme Court on May 29, 2024. Their petition claims that the Second Circuit's holding is a "dilution" of Rule 60(b)(6)'s strict requirements and that it creates "a dangerous loophole out of step with the other federal circuits." The Supreme Court granted certiorari on October 4, 2024.

== Oral arguments ==
Oral arguments took place at the Supreme Court on March 3, 2025. Arguments were given by Michael H. McGinley (for the petitioner) and by Michael J. Radine (for the respondents). These were McGinley's second oral arguments before the Supreme Court, and Radine's first.

McGinley began his argument by describing the Second Circuit's approach as an "outlier view" with "no basis in law or logic". He asserted that the Second Circuit had created "an inherently contradictory test" and he asked that the Court reverse. After McGinley's opening statement, questions began with Justice Thomas. Over the course of the oral argument, McGinley had extended colloquies with Justices Sotomayor, Gorsuch, Kagan, and Jackson.

Following McGinley, Radine rose to the podium to present his arguments. Whereas McGinley had primarily focused on the Federal Rules of Civil Procedure themselves in his argument, Radine instead highlighted the atypical procedural history of the case and argued that the respondents "did everything you'd want litigants to do." He concluded his opening statement by referencing "extraordinary circumstances" pertaining to this case that merit the sort of balancing of Rules 60(b)(6) and 15(a) that the Second Circuit had engaged in. Questions once again began with Justice Thomas, this time followed up shortly by Justice Kavanaugh. More extended colloquies were engaged with Justices Kagan, Gorsuch, Barrett, and Jackson. Additionally, Justices Sotomayor and Alito had brief exchanges with Radine during the final round of questions moderated by the Chief Justice.

Arguments concluded with McGinley's rebuttal. He once again called for the Court to reverse entirely upon the Second Circuit's ruling, and he described the respondents' arguments regarding procedural irregularities as "inexcusable neglect" that courts should not be rescuing litigants from. He concluded by reminding the Court that this case relates to events that ultimately happened twenty-five years prior and described the matter as a "zombie case that should have been over years ago."

The total duration of the oral arguments was 52 minutes and 41 seconds.

== Holding ==
The opinion of the court was authored by Justice Thomas. The opinion given by Thomas was joined in toto by all of the other justices, except for Justice Jackson who joined to all parts of the opinion save for Part III and gave a separate concurrence expressing her divergence.

The holding reversed the Second Circuit's approach to balancing the interests of Rules 60(b) and 15(a). In its stead, the Court reasserted the necessity of the standards set in Rule 60(b). In particular, the Court explained that the relationship between the two rules is governed by an "order of operations": Rule 60(b)'s requirements must be satisfied first before Rule 15(a)'s liberal pleading amendment policy can come into consideration. The Court rejected the Second Circuit's notion that Rule 15(a)'s liberal amendment policy would bear any weight on determining whether it was appropriate to reopen a case via Rule 60(b).

Specifically at issue in this case was Rule 60(b)(6), which the Court describes as a "catchall" for any matters of judicial fairness that fall outside of the circumstances expressly allowed for in Rule 60(b)(1)-(5). The Court reaffirmed the catchall status of 60(b)(6) and that it is only available in "extraordinary circumstances" by referencing their earlier holding in the 2022 case Kemp v. United States. The Court also gave an overview of its previous jurisprudence on the matter dating back to 1949 in order to illustrate how it is important that the party moving for relief under Rule 60(b)(6) must be faultless in the extraordinary circumstances they allege. This was not apparent for the plaintiffs in the present case, which the trial court describes as having “had ample opportunity to pursue all legal avenues available to them for relief."

The Court in its holding also took issue with the Second Circuit's decision to weigh in on the matter of the plaintiffs' Rule 60(b)(6) motion at all. Rulings on Rule 60(b) motions are only reviewable on an abuse-of-discretion standard. The District Court here applied the correct legal standard and gave adequate rationale for its decision based on the present facts. Therefore, the Second Circuit erred in finding this matter appropriate for their review in the first place.
