= Babcock v. Kijakazi =

- Supreme Court of the United States

Decided January 13, 2022
- Full case name: Babcock v. Kijakazi
- Docket no.: 20-480
- Citations: 595 U.S. 77 (more)

Holding
- Civil-service pension payments based on employment as a dual-status military technician are not payments based on "service as a member of a uniformed service."

Court membership
- Chief Justice John Roberts Associate Justices Clarence Thomas · Stephen Breyer; Samuel Alito · Sonia Sotomayor; Elena Kagan · Neil Gorsuch; Brett Kavanaugh · Amy Coney Barrett

Case opinions
- Majority: Barrett, joined by Roberts, Thomas, Breyer, Alito, Sotomayor, Kagan, Kavanaugh
- Dissent: Gorsuch

Laws applied
- 42 U.S.C. § 415(1)(7)(A)(III)

Babcock v. Kijakazi, 595 U.S. 77 (2022), was a United States Supreme Court case in which the Court held that civil-service pension payments based on employment as a dual-status military technician are not payments based on "service as a member of a uniformed service" under 42 U.S.C. § 415(1)(7)(A)(III).

== Description ==
Babcock worked as a dual-status technician for the National Guard from 1975 to 2009, and he was hired on as a civilian before some staffing organization changes in 1984. As part of his job, he was required to wear a uniform every day.

In essence, the government's position was that Babcock was hired as a civilian and was never a member of the National Guard. Accordingly, the government reduced his Social Security benefits because an exception that shielded service members from the reduction did not cover Babcock. The Supreme Court agreed with the government's position, saying the requirement that the employee wear a uniform is not what makes one a member of a uniformed service.

== See also ==
- Ohio Adjutant General's Department v. Federal Labor Relations Authority
