= Air Courier Conference of America v. American Postal Workers Union =

- Supreme Court of the United States

Decided February 26, 1991
- Full case name: Air Courier Conference of America v. American Postal Workers Union
- Citations: 498 U.S. 517 (more)

Holding
- A plaintiff challenging government action that does not regulate their own conduct must show that they are within the statute's "zone" of protection to have Article III standing.

Court membership
- Chief Justice William Rehnquist Associate Justices Byron White · Thurgood Marshall; Harry Blackmun · John P. Stevens; Sandra Day O'Connor · Antonin Scalia; Anthony Kennedy · David Souter

Case opinions
- Majority: Rehnquist
- Concurrence: Stevens (in judgment), joined by Marshall, Blackmun

Air Courier Conference of America v. American Postal Workers Union, 498 U.S. 517 (1991), was a United States Supreme Court case in which the court held that a plaintiff challenging government action that does not regulate their own conduct must show that they are within the statute's "zone" of protection to have Article III standing.

== Background ==
The United States Postal Service's monopoly over the carriage of letters in and for the United States is codified in a group of statutes known as the Private Express Statutes (PES). The monopoly was created by Congress as a revenue protection measure for the Postal Service vis-a-vis private competitors. Pursuant to a PES provision allowing it to suspend PES restrictions as to any mail route where the public interest so requires, the Postal Service issued a regulation authorizing a practice called "international remailing," which entails bypassing the Service and using private couriers to deposit with foreign postal services letters destined for foreign addresses. Unions representing Postal Service employees sued in federal District Court, challenging the regulation pursuant to the judicial review provisions of the Administrative Procedure Act (APA) and claiming that the rulemaking record was inadequate to support a finding that the regulation's suspension of the PES was in the public interest. The D.C. Circuit Court of Appeals vacated the District Court's grant of summary judgment in favor of the Postal Service and the Air Courier Conference of America (ACCA), holding that the unions satisfied the zone-of-interests requirement for APA review under Clarke v. Securities Industry Ass'n, 479 U. S. 388. On the merits, the D.C. Circuit ruled that the PES suspension was not justified by the public interest.

== Opinion of the court ==
The Supreme Court issued an opinion on February 26, 1991.
