= List of United States Supreme Court cases, volume 498 =

This is a list of all the United States Supreme Court cases from volume 498 of the United States Reports:

Case name	Citation	Date decided
Shell v. Mississippi	498 U.S. 1	1990
Temple v. Synthes Corp.	498 U.S. 5	1990
United States v. Louisiana	498 U.S. 9	1990
Mississippi v. United States	498 U.S. 16	1990
Miles v. Apex Marine Corp.	498 U.S. 19	1990
Perry v. Louisiana	498 U.S. 38	1990
Cage v. Louisiana	498 U.S. 39	1990
Langenkamp v. Culp	498 U.S. 42	1990
Palmer v. BRG of Ga., Inc.	498 U.S. 46	1990
FMC Corp. v. Holliday	498 U.S. 52	1990
Arcadia v. Ohio Power Co.	498 U.S. 73	1990
Irwin v. Department of Veterans Affairs	498 U.S. 89	1990
Moskal v. United States	498 U.S. 103	1990
Ingersoll-Rand Co. v. McClendon	498 U.S. 133	1990
Minnick v. Mississippi	498 U.S. 146	1990
Groves v. Ring Screw Works, Ferndale Fastener Div.	498 U.S. 168	1990
In re Sindram	498 U.S. 177	1991
Demarest v. Manspeaker	498 U.S. 184	1991
Cheek v. United States	498 U.S. 192	1991
Mobil Oil Exploration & Producing Southeast, Inc. v. United Distribution Cos.	498 U.S. 211	1991
In re Berger	498 U.S. 233	1991
Board of Ed. of Oklahoma City Public Schools v. Dowell	498 U.S. 237	1991
Firstier Mortgage Co. v. Investors Mortgage Ins. Co.	498 U.S. 269	1991
Grogan v. Garner	498 U.S. 279	1991
United States v. R. Enterprises, Inc.	498 U.S. 292	1991
Parker v. Dugger	498 U.S. 308	1991
United States v. France	498 U.S. 335	1991
Ohio v. Huertas	498 U.S. 336	1991
Dismissed as improvidently granted.
McDermott Int'l, Inc. v. Wilander	498 U.S. 337	1991
Trinova Corp. v. Michigan Dept. of Treasury	498 U.S. 358	1991
Gozlon-Peretz v. United States	498 U.S. 395	1991
Ford v. Georgia	498 U.S. 411	1991
Freeport-McMoRan Inc. v. K N Energy, Inc.	498 U.S. 426	1991
Lozada v. Deeds	498 U.S. 430	1991
Burden v. Zant	498 U.S. 433	1991
Dennis v. Higgins	498 U.S. 439	1991
Masters, Mates & Pilots v. Brown	498 U.S. 466	1991
McNary v. Haitian Refugee Center, Inc.	498 U.S. 479	1991
Oklahoma Tax Comm'n v. Citizen Band of Potawatomi Tribe of Okla.	498 U.S. 505	1991
Air Courier Conference v. Postal Workers	498 U.S. 517	1991
Business Guides, Inc. v. Chromatic Communications Enterprises, Inc.	498 U.S. 533	1991
Feist Publications, Inc., v. Rural Telephone Service Co.	498 U.S. 808	1990
Madden v. Texas	498 U.S. 1301	1991
Mississippi v. Turner	498 U.S. 1306	1991
