= Buffalo Billion =

Development project by state government of New York

Buffalo is a city known for snow. It is not the first place one would think to build a solar panel factory. But the city will soon be the home of the largest such manufacturing facility in the Western Hemisphere, according to SolarCity, the San Mateo, Calif.–based company that is set to begin moving into the complex later this year.

— Engineering News-Record,
July 16, 2015

Buffalo Billion is a New York state government project led by former Governor Andrew Cuomo that aims to invest $1 billion in the Buffalo, New York area economy. The project uses a combination of state grants and tax breaks to spur economic development. Governor Cuomo first announced the program in his 2012 "State of the State" address. The program is modeled on a similar program implemented in the Albany, New York area. A key project in the program is a $750 million SolarCity solar panel factory, that was taken over by Tesla in 2016 and is called Gigafactory New York.

An example of projects developing under Buffalo Billion include:

- Solar panel factories
- A solar panel array at a former Bethlehem Steel plant in Lackawanna built by BQ Energy, a renewable energy development company

Some components of the project came to fruition before Cuomo's term ended in 2021. Some parts are still pending, and with some aspects of the project, corruption allegations have emerged.

On May 15, 2023, Athenex, which was part of the project, filed for Chapter 11 bankruptcy protection.

== Development projects ==
Name	Funds from Buffalo Billion	Project	Completion date
SolarCity solar panel factory	$750 million	Solar panel factory	Summer 2017
Athenex high-tech drug research	$200 million	Research facility in Dunkirk, N.Y. and labs in Buffalo	Ongoing from 2016 to 2026
Buffalo High Tech Manufacturing Innovation Hub at RiverBend	$225 million	Facility to host clean energy businesses	2015
Buffalo Medical Innovation and Commercialization Hub	$50 million	Biomedical research equipment and facilities center	2015
Genomic research partnership	$50 million	Partnership between the University at Buffalo and the New York Genome Center in Manhattan. Goal is to use genomic medical research to find new ways to treat, prevent, and manage serious diseases.	Unknown
Workforce training and development	Approximately $10 million	Train new workers going into manufacturing jobs	"2015 and beyond"
Buffalo Niagara Institute for Advanced Manufacturing Competitiveness	"Unspecified, but likely to be "tens of millions" of dollars. The state has spent $8 million to buy a temporary site and is paying $800,000 to the facility's operator."	Institute to help local manufacturing companies create new products	Spring 2014
Downtown Niagara Falls development challenge	$20 million	Revitalize downtown Niagara Falls	Ongoing from 2014 to 2019
Robert Moses Parkway removal	$11.5 million	"Remove a roughly one-mile stretch of the Robert Moses Parkway along the upper rapids of the Niagara River as part of a bid to bolster Niagara Falls as a tourist destination and remove a barrier between the waterfront and downtown Niagara Falls"	Spring 2016
Daemen College/ Empire Visual Effects	$4.5 million	Create a visual effects industry in Buffalo	Unspecified
Rainbow Centre Mall	Unknown	Fill the empty mall with businesses	Unknown

== SolarCity ==
In 2016 SolarCity was the largest rooftop solar installer in the United States, headquartered in San Mateo, California. Under Buffalo Billion, SolarCity received $750 million in incentives in exchange for building a factory. According to The New York Times, after the factory is complete, SolarCity will create 1,500 new jobs on site; an additional 1,500 new jobs are expected to be created among suppliers in the area.

SolarCity's Buffalo plant, in figures
Component	Number
Acres	88
Building size (sq. ft.)	1,200,000
Project schedule (months)	18
Buffalo Billion incentives	$750,000,000

In mid-May 2016, the New York legislature had planned to take a vote on a measure that would have given an extra $500 million to the SolarCity project. However, legislators pulled back the vote. The New York Times wrote that legislators "hinted they would exercise more oversight of the governor's banner economic initiative."

== Panasonic and Tesla factory ==
Up through August 2018, the company Tesla bought all of the solar modules manufactured by Panasonic in Buffalo, New York. According to an August 2018 report in the Wall Street Journal, Tesla is no longer buying all of the solar modules produce there. Over 600 people work at the factory in Buffalo.

A $750 million state subsidy from the Buffalo Billion program helped build and equip the factory. Tesla took over the factory in 2016 when it acquired SolarCity. At that time, Tesla said that it was partnering with Panasonic. In December 2016, the two companies announced a deal. The deal included a commitment from Tesla to buy all of the Panasonic output at the factory. The Wall Street Journal report wrote that the deal to buy all the Panasonic output is no longer the case. Earlier in 2018, Tesla revised the contract to remove the exclusivity clause. Since that time, Panasonic has been selling solar modules manufactured at the Buffalo plant to other companies that make solar panels.

In early August 2018, Reuters reported that there were issues with production at the Buffalo factory. The report said that there were delays caused by assembly-line problems.

=== Production issues and state subsidies to Tesla ===
There have been repeated holdups at the Buffalo factory since it opened in 2017. The holdups have forced Panasonic to seek out other buyers for the components it built that it had planned to sell to Tesla.

The production issues have also "rattled the face of state officials" regarding the ability of Tesla to deliver on investment and employment promises. Tesla had made those promises to the state in exchange for $750 million in state subsidies. The state gave Tesla $350 million to build a factory. The state also provided $274.7 million for equipment and $125.3 million for additional costs. The state subsidy package requires that Tesla employs 1460 people in Buffalo; 500 of those people must be employed at the Buffalo plant. The deal also requires Tesla to spend $5 billion in New York over a decade. Empire State Development, which is New York's economic development agency, oversees the agreement between New York and Tesla.

According to Reuters, Tesla's solar operations are cash-strapped.

Tesla is also seeing production delays in its electric vehicles.

In 2016, Tesla acquired SolarCity in a controversial $2.6 billion purchase. SolarCity was founded by two of Elon Musk's cousins. (Musk is the CEO of Tesla).

At the Buffalo factory, Tesla produces the Solar Roof product. The roof is designed to look like a normal roof while generating electricity from solar energy. The combination functionality of the rooftop "has proved challenging."

As of May 31, 2018, in all of California, which is the country's leading solar market, there were only 12 Tesla roof systems connected to the grid. For those systems, the cost per watt was nearly 6 dollars. That amount is double the national average for solar systems. However that comparison is misleading since the Solar Roof system replaces the roof sheathing as well as providing solar power.

== Government investigations ==
According to the New York Post, "[Governor Andrew] Cuomo's Buffalo Billion did generate a whole mountain of corruption."

Cuomo's top aide, Joe Percoco, was convicted in March 2018 of bribery and wire fraud. However, in May 2023, Percoco and western New York developer Louis Ciminelli had their convictions reversed by the United States Supreme Court.

In July 2018, four men were convicted of rigging bids for state contracts worth hundreds of millions of dollars, including Buffalo Billion: Alain Kaloyeros, former SUNY Polytechnic Institute head; Steven Aiello and Joseph Gerardi, executives at Syracuse-based COR Development Co.; and Louis Ciminelli, the CEO of LPCiminelli Inc. Peter Galbraith Kelly Jr., the son of high-profile Connecticut-based lobbyist Peter G. Kelly was sentenced to 14 months in prison in October 2018 after pleading guilty to one charge of conspiracy to commit wire fraud when he oversaw the development of the Oxford Power Plant.

=== Federal investigation ===
The federal government investigated the distribution of Buffalo Billion project money and contracts. The office of Preet Bharara, the United States Attorney for the Southern District of New York, headed the investigation.

Federal prosecutors filed charges in September 2016. In November 2016, a federal grand jury indicted Cuomo's former aide Joseph Percoco and the former president of the SUNY Polytechnic Institute, Alain Kaloyeros, for bribery and bid rigging, alongside six government contractors. Percoco was accused of taking at least $315,000 in bribes. In March 2018, a federal jury in Manhattan convicted Percoco on felony charges of honest services fraud and soliciting bribes from Competitive Power Ventures, an energy company, and COR Development, a real estate developer. Cuomo's former aide Todd Howe had already pleaded guilty to eight corruption charges relating to COR Development and LPCiminelli.

A handful of people connected closely to each other have dominated the process of planning, building and promoting the majority of Buffalo Billion's projects. Some include developers who have contributed to Cuomo's campaign. The New York Times wrote on May 24, 2016:

...federal investigators' interest seems to lie less with whether the people of Buffalo will ultimately benefit than with those who already have: a tangle of well-connected players — including developers and frequent donors to the governor — who have feasted on Buffalo Billion money.

==== LPCiminelli ====
In November 2013, the CEO of LPCiminelli, Louis P. Ciminelli, hosted a fundraiser for Cuomo three weeks before submitting his company's bid to the Buffalo Billion program. According to the New York Times:

... the state's request for proposals was worded in a way that appeared to exclude all bidders except the eventual winner, LPCiminelli. State officials later said that was the result of a "typographical error." LPCiminelli is a prominent builder in the city whose chief executive, Louis P. Ciminelli, has generously supported Mr. Cuomo: Mr. Ciminelli and his associates and relatives have given nearly $150,000 to his campaigns over the years.

Ciminelli personally contributed $96,500 to Cuomo's gubernatorial campaigns.

In late 2014, Cuomo increased the state's pledge to the SolarCity construction project from $225 million to $750 million. Bharara's office has issued LPCiminelli a subpoena in the investigation, but LPCiminelli was not the target of the investigation. Although Ciminelli may not have been the target of this investigation, he was arrested for his company's role in the scandal in September 2016, and indicted in November 2016.

Louis Ciminelli has had legal issues in the past. In 1991 he was listed as a co-defendant in a Racketeer Influenced and Corrupt Organizations (RICO) suit against long time mob controlled Laborers' International Union of North America (LIUNA) Local 210 in Buffalo. His name appears with known soldiers and associates of the Buffalo Crime family including Leonard Falzone, Dan Sansanese, Joseph Pieri, Peter Gerace, and Salvatore Caci. The Ciminelli family has been under investigation more than once. In 1986, LIUNA was going to bring a lawsuit against 20 Buffalo area contractors and Ron Fino was told by Buffalo Family underboss Joe Todaro, Jr and consigliere Leonard Falzone that Frank Ciminelli (Louis' father) was connected and all his companies were "off limits".

It now appears L.P. Ciminelli is being investigated on another possible bid rigging charge involving the Culinary Institute project for Niagara County Community College.

==== Empire State Development Corporation ====
Federal prosecutors are investigating the Empire State Development Corporation (ESD); specifically, how ESD chose companies to give award fund to for the Buffalo Billion project. The U.S. Attorney's office asked ESD to assist it by providing documentation. To aid in that process, ESD has hired a Washington, D.C. law firm at the rate of $800 per hour. WGRZ asked the U.S. Attorney Bharara to comment about the case, but Bharara declined.

==== Competitive Power Ventures ====
Another federal investigation also involved the son of Peter G. Kelly. In October 2018, Competitive Power Ventures (CPV) executive Peter G. Kelley Jr., who oversaw the development of the regional Oxford Power Plant, was sentenced to 14 months in prison after pleading guilty to conspiracy to commit wire fraud. The charge involved funneling $285,000 to Percoco after hiring his wife for a “low-show” job with Competitive Power Ventures. Kelley Jr. was also ordered to pay $250,000 in restitution to CPV and serve three years of supervised release.

=== New York state investigation ===
==== McGuire Development and SUNY Polytechnic Institute ====
McGuire Development, which was awarded contracts to build a technology hub, donated $25,000 to Cuomo's campaigns. However, Cuomo's office said that the State University of New York (SUNY) and its non-profit was in charge of the bidding process, and the governor's office did not play a role.

The head of SUNY Polytechnic Institute, Alain Kaloyeros, is a point person for Buffalo Billion. On May 4, 2016, media reported that New York Attorney General Eric Schneiderman has been investigating Kaloyeros in a possible alleged "bid-rigging" violation related to the development of a dorm constructed at SUNY Polytechnic. One developer (Columbia) submitted a bid for the dormitory. Both Kaloyeros and Columbia have close ties with Governor Andrew Cuomo; Kaloyeros has served as an advisor and Columbia has contributed a substantial sum of campaign money.

==== Excelsior Jobs Program ====
As of June 2016, New York state comptroller Thomas DiNapoli has been conducting a year-long audit of the Excelsior Jobs Program. Within that audit is, DiNapoli's office has been investigating tax breaks that the program gave to companies who participated in the Buffalo Billion program. Two legislators asked DiNapoli to conduct a full audit of all Buffalo Billion spending; DiNapoli declined their request. According to the Buffalo News, DiNapoli is considering reviewing some of the spending that took place within Buffalo Billion.

== See also ==
- Ciminelli v. United States
