= Ortiz v. Jordan =

- Supreme Court of the United States

Decided January 24, 2011
- Full case name: Ortiz v. Jordan
- Citations: 562 U.S. 180 (more)

Holding
- A party may not appeal a denial of summary judgment after a district court has conducted a full trial on the merits.

Court membership
- Chief Justice John Roberts Associate Justices Antonin Scalia · Anthony Kennedy; Clarence Thomas · Ruth Bader Ginsburg; Stephen Breyer · Samuel Alito; Sonia Sotomayor · Elena Kagan

Case opinion
- Majority: Ginsburg, joined by unanimous

Laws applied
- Federal Rules of Civil Procedure

Ortiz v. Jordan, 562 U.S. 180 (2011), was a United States Supreme Court case in which the Court held that a party may not appeal a denial of summary judgment after a district court has conducted a full trial on the merits.

== See also ==
- Dupree v. Younger
