= List of United States Supreme Court cases, volume 598 =

This is a list of all the United States Supreme Court cases from volume 598 of the United States Reports:

Note: As of July 2025, final bound volumes for the U.S. Supreme Court's United States Reports have been published through volume 582 (June 2017). Newer cases from subsequent future volumes do not yet have official page numbers and typically use three underscores in place of the page number; e.g., Example v. United States, 700 U.S. ___ (2050).

Case name	Docket no.	Date decided
Arellano v. McDonough	21–432	January 23, 2023
38 U.S.C. § 5110(b)(1), a provision relating to VA disability compensations, is not subject to equitable tolling.
In re Grand Jury	21–1397	January 23, 2023
Dismissed as improvidently granted.
Cruz v. Arizona	21–846	February 22, 2023
The Arizona Supreme Court's holding that Lynch v. Arizona was not a significant change in the law is an exceptional case where a state-court judgment rests on such a novel and unforeseeable interpretation of a state-court procedural rule that the decision is not adequate to foreclose review of the federal claim.
Helix Energy Solutions Group, Inc. v. Hewitt	21–984	February 22, 2023
Regardless of income level, workers are not considered salaried unless the conditions set out in the Fair Labor Standards Act of 1938 are met.
Bartenwerfer v. Buckley	21–908	February 22, 2023
Section 523(a)(2)(A) precludes someone from discharging in bankruptcy a debt obtained by fraud, regardless of their own culpability.
Bittner v. United States	21–1195	February 28, 2023
The penalty for non-willful failure to report a bank account under the Bank Secrecy Act applies once per failed report, not once per account.
Delaware v. Pennsylvania	22o145	February 28, 2023
Unclaimed MoneyGram payments constitute "money orders" or "similar written instruments" subject to escheatment under the Federal Disposition Act, 12 U.S.C. § 2503.
Luna Perez v. Sturgis Public Schools	21–887	March 21, 2023
An Americans with Disability Act suit seeking compensatory damages for denial of a Free and Appropriate Public Education (FAPE) can proceed without exhausting the administrative procedures of the Individuals with Disabilities Education Act (IDEA).
Wilkins v. United States	21–1164	March 28, 2023
The 12-year statute of limitations in section 2409a(g) of the Quiet Title Act is a non-jurisdictional claims-processing rule.
Axon Enterprise, Inc. v. Federal Trade Commission	21–86	April 14, 2023
The statutory review schemes set out in the Securities Exchange Act and Federal Trade Commission Act do not displace a district court's federal-question jurisdiction over claims challenging as unconstitutional the structure or existence of the SEC or FTC.
New York v. New Jersey	22o156	April 18, 2023
New Jersey has the unilateral right to withdraw from the Waterfront Commission of New York Harbor.
Reed v. Goertz	21–442	April 19, 2023
When an incarcerated person pursues state post-conviction DNA testing through the state-provided litigation process, the statute of limitations for a §1983 procedural due process claim begins to run when the state litigation ends, in this case when the Texas Court of Criminal Appeals denied Reed’s motion for rehearing.
Türkiye Halk Bankası A.Ş. v. United States	21–1450	April 19, 2023
The Foreign Sovereign Immunities Act's comprehensive scheme governing claims of sovereign immunity in civil actions against foreign states and their instrumentalities does not cover criminal cases.
MOAC Mall Holdings LLC v. Transform Holdco LLC	21–1270	April 19, 2023
Section 363(m) of the Bankruptcy Code, which restricts the effects of certain successful appeals of judicially authorized sales or leases of bankruptcy-estate property, is not a jurisdictional provision.
Ciminelli v. United States	21–1170	May 11, 2023
Not being rooted in a traditional property right, the "right to control" theory cannot be used to criminally convict someone.
Percoco v. United States	21–1158	May 11, 2023
Instructing the jury based on the Second Circuit's 1982 decision in Margiotta on the legal standard for finding that a private citizen owes the government a duty of honest services was error.
Financial Oversight and Management Board for Puerto Rico v. Centro de Periodismo Investigativo, Inc.	22–96	May 11, 2023
Nothing in the Puerto Rico Oversight, Management, and Economic Stability Act categorically nullified any sovereign immunity the Board enjoys from legal claims.
National Pork Producers Council v. Ross	21–468	May 11, 2023
Affirmed the lower courts, dismissing the case and allowing the law to stand.
Santos-Zacaria v. Garland	21–1436	May 11, 2023
The requirement that a noncitizen facing a removal order must exhaust all administrative remedies before seeking judicial review of the removal order is not jurisdictional.
Polselli v. Internal Revenue Service	21–1599	May 18, 2023
When the Internal Revenue Service issues a summons in aid of collecting a tax liability, the exception to the notice requirement in 26 U.S.C. § 7609(c)(2)(D)(i) applies even if the delinquent taxpayer has no legal interest in the accounts or records summoned.
Ohio Adjutant General's Department v. Federal Labor Relations Authority	21–1454	May 18, 2023
The Federal Labor Relations Authority had jurisdiction over a State National Guard labor dispute because a state National Guard acts as a federal agency for the purpose of the Federal Service Labor-Management Relations Statute when it hires and supervises dual-status technicians serving in their civilian role.
Twitter, Inc. v. Taamneh	21–1496	May 18, 2023
Respondents' allegations that Twitter aided and abetted ISIS in its terrorist attack on the Reina nightclub fail to state a claim under 18 U.S.C. § 2333(d)(2).
Andy Warhol Foundation for the Visual Arts, Inc. v. Goldsmith	21–869	May 18, 2023
Minor alterations to a copyrighted work are not transformative under fair use where altered work was used commercially for substantially similar purpose as original; courts must analyze the specific use of an allegedly infringing work before determining whether that use was transformative.
Amgen Inc v. Sanofi	21–757	May 18, 2023
Petitioner Amgen’s two patent applications—purporting to cover all antibodies that bind and block the PCSK9 receptor involved in LDL cholesterol metabolism—fail to satisfy the Patent Act’s enablement clause.
Gonzalez v. Google LLC	21–1333	May 18, 2023
Vacated and remanded for reconsideration in light of the Court’s decision in Twitter, Inc. v. Taamneh.
Calcutt v. FDIC	22–714	May 22, 2023
An administrative agency's discretionary order may be upheld in court only on the same basis articulated in the order by the agency itself.
Tyler v. Hennepin County	22–166	May 25, 2023
The retention of the excess value of a home above a person's tax debt violates the Takings Clause of the Fifth Amendment.
Sackett v. EPA	21–454	May 25, 2023
Only wetlands and permanent bodies of water with a "continuous surface connection" to "traditional interstate navigable waters" are covered by the Clean Water Act.
Dupree v. Younger	22–210	May 25, 2023
A post-trial motion under Federal Rule of Civil Procedure 50 is not required to preserve for appellate review a purely legal issue resolved at summary judgment.
United States ex rel. Schutte v. Supervalu Inc.	21–1326	June 1, 2023
The False Claims Act's scienter element, which requires a defendant to "knowingly" give a "false" claim to the government, refers to a defendant’s knowledge and subjective beliefs. It does not refer to what an objectively reasonable person may have known or believed.
Slack Technologies, LLC v. Pirani	22–200	June 1, 2023
To state a claim under Section 11(a) of the Securities Act of 1933, a plaintiff must plead and prove that he purchased "such security" that is "traceable to the allegedly defective registration statement".
Glacier Northwest, Inc. v. Teamsters	21–1449	June 1, 2023
The National Labor Relations Act did not preempt Glacier’s state tort claims related to the destruction of company property during a labor dispute where the union failed to take reasonable precautions to avoid foreseeable and imminent danger to the property.

== See also ==
- List of United States Supreme Court cases by the Roberts Court
- 2022 term opinions of the Supreme Court of the United States
