= Arellano v. McDonough =

Arellano v. Mcdonough
- Supreme Court of the United States

Argued October 4, 2022 Decided January 23, 2023
- Full case name: Adolfo R. Arellano v. Denis R. McDonough, Secretary of Veterans Affairs
- Docket no.: 21-432
- Citations: 598 U.S. 1 (more)
- Argument: Oral argument
- Opinion announcement: Opinion announcement

Holding
- 38 U.S.C. § 5110(b)(1) is not subject to equitable tolling.

Court membership
- Chief Justice John Roberts Associate Justices Clarence Thomas · Samuel Alito; Sonia Sotomayor · Elena Kagan; Neil Gorsuch · Brett Kavanaugh; Amy Coney Barrett · Ketanji Brown Jackson

Case opinion
- Majority: Barrett, joined by unanimous

Arellano v. McDonough, 598 U. S. 1 (2023), is a United States Supreme Court case in which the Court held that 38 U.S.C. § 5110(b)(1), a provision relating to VA disability compensations, is not subject to equitable tolling.

== Background ==
38 U.S.C. § 5110 outlines the procedures for a veteran to receive compensation for service-caused disability. Section 5110(a)(1) specifies that veterans should be awarded compensations from the time their application was received, unless "specifically provided otherwise" in 16 following enumerated provisions. One such exception is § 5110(b)(1), which states that "the effective date of an award... shall be the day following the date of the veteran's discharge or release if application... is received within one year from such date."

Adolfo Arellano served in the U.S. Navy from 1977 to 1981. He experienced prolonged psychiatric problems such as schizoaffective disorder and bipolar disorder as a result of his service. In 2011, he applied for disability benefits and was awarded benefits with the date of his application as the effective date. Arellano, represented by his brother, appealed to the Board of Veterans' Appeals, arguing that the one-year deadline of 5110(b)(1) should be equitably tolled. This would allow Arellano to receive retroactive benefits back to the date of his discharge, citing his mental disabilities which purportedly prevented him from applying for benefits within a year of his discharge.

The Board of Veterans' Appeals dismissed Arellano's claim for equitable tolling. The Court of Appeals for Veterans Claims also dismissed the claim, holding that Andrews, an earlier Federal Circuit decision, had already rejected equitable tolling as applied to 5110. Arellano then appealed to the Federal Circuit, which dismissed his claim, splitting 6-6 on the rationale. Half the Court agreed with Andrews, while the other half sought to overrule Andrews, but deny equitable tolling in Arellano's case. Arellano petitioned the Supreme Court for certiorari, which was granted on February 22, 2022.

The Court had also previously considered interpretation of equitable tolling in Irwin v. Department of Veterans Affairs (1990), although had not tackled the issue of interpretation under the (b)(1) statute. Prior to the argument being heard in the SCOTUS, a brief from the Department of Justice stated that the court ruling in favor of Arellano's argument on equitable tolling would cause "immense practical problems" to an "overburdened system".

Amicus curiae briefs were filed by multiple organizations, including the AARP and the Constitutional Accountability Center.

== Supreme Court ==
The court's opinion was authored by Justice Barrett, and fully joined by all members of the court. The court did not address the question of whether § 5110(b)(1) is a statute of limitations or not, but rather found equitable tolling rebutted even if it was. With emphasis on the "[u]nless specifically provided otherwise" clause, the court concluded that the chapter's provisions are an exhaustive list of exceptions to the regular rule. Therefore, additional exceptions, like the application of equitable tolling, would defy the statute's intent. This determination is strengthened, according to the court, by the character of the provisions, which set detailed instructions for particular situations in which benefits qualify for an earlier date. Moreover, these limits are not merely set in terms of time, but also mention the amount of recovery due, suggesting Congress' interest in capping retroactive benefits.

In response to Arellano's structural counter-claims, the court asserted that (b)(1) could not be understood independently of (a)(1), and so it may not be analyzed separately for exceptions. And with regards to Arellano's insistence that (b)(4) help rather than weaken his case, the court responded that presence of equity in a scheme "supplements...principles of equitable tolling" only "where equity would not otherwise have permitted [the exception]." Here however, the court found that "§5110(b)(4) does not authorize tolling that equity would not otherwise have allowed. If anything, its conditional and narrow applicability limits tolling that might otherwise have occurred."
