= Malwarebytes, Inc. v. Enigma Software Group USA, LLC =

Federal Court Case challenging section 230 of the Communications Decency Act

Malwarebytes, Inc. v. Enigma Software Group USA, LLC was a 2020 United States federal court case concerning the legal immunity given to internet companies under section 230 of the Communications Decency Act. It was denied certiorari to the U.S. Court of Appeals for the Ninth Circuit, but Justice Clarence Thomas of the Supreme Court of the United States made a statement respecting the denial of certiorari. He opined that section 230 had been interpreted too broadly, and could be narrowed or eliminated in a future case, which he urged his colleagues to hear.

Courts have…departed from the most natural reading of the text by giving Internet companies immunity for their own content ... Section 230(c)(1) protects a company from publisher liability only when content is 'provided by another information content provider.' Nowhere does this provision protect a company that is itself the information content provider.

Justice Thomas cited Judge Robert Katzman's dissent from the majority ruling in Force v. Facebook Inc.
