= Pennsylvania v. New York =

- Supreme Court of the United States

Argued March 29, 1972 Decided June 19, 1972
- Full case name: Pennsylvania v. New York, et al.
- Citations: 407 U.S. 206 (more) 92 S. Ct. 2075; 32 L. Ed. 2d 693; 1972 U.S. LEXIS 35

Case history
- Subsequent: Decree entered, 407 U.S. 206 (1972).

Court membership
- Chief Justice Warren E. Burger Associate Justices William O. Douglas · William J. Brennan Jr. Potter Stewart · Byron White; Thurgood Marshall · Harry Blackmun; Lewis F. Powell Jr. · William Rehnquist

Case opinions
- Majority: Brennan, joined by Burger, Douglas, Stewart, White, Marshall
- Dissent: Powell, joined by Blackmun, Rehnquist

Pennsylvania v. New York was a case that was heard in 1972 before the U.S. Supreme Court. The initial filing was allowed at 407 U.S. 206 and the final decision was ordered at 407 U.S. 223 (1972).

When two states have a controversy between each other, the case is filed for original jurisdiction with the United States Supreme Court. This is one of the very limited circumstances where the court acts as original jurisdiction, e.g., a trial court. In all other cases, the court acts as the highest level appellate court in the United States.

In this case, Western Union had issued money orders that were either never redeemed or erroneously underpaid (e.g., a money order for $500 paid as $300), and enough time had passed that the value of the money orders was considered unclaimed property. In such a case, unclaimed money escheats to the state. The question of the case was, which state should get the money, the state where the money order was purchased, or the state where Western Union was incorporated? Pennsylvania argued for the former, stating that if it were the latter, then New York (where Western Union was then incorporated) would receive a financial windfall.

As is the practice in original jurisdiction cases, the Supreme Court had a special master hear the case and make a decision. The Special Master decided to rely on the logic of the previous decision of the U.S. Supreme Court in Texas v. New Jersey. The court approved the decision of the special master.

The final decision ruled that if a money order is never redeemed or is under-redeemed, if Western Union knows who the purchaser or redeemer is, and a money order is never redeemed or is under-redeemed, the remaining money escheats to the state where that purchaser resides, subject to that state's rules for escheat of unclaimed money or property. However, if Western Union does not know who the purchaser or the person who redeemed it is, the money escheats to the state where Western Union is incorporated (e.g., New York at that time; it later reincorporated in Delaware).

== Later congressional legislation ==
Congress would weigh in on the matter two years later by passing the Disposition of Abandoned Money Orders and Traveler’s Checks Act (also known as the Federal Disposition Act or FDA), which decreed (in line with Pennsylvania's arguments) that the state where the money order was purchased should be the state to which unclaimed proceeds escheat, as most people purchase these items in the state of their residence.

== See also ==
- List of United States Supreme Court cases, volume 407
