= Northwestern Bank =

- Industry: Banking
- Founded: 1955; 71 years ago
- Defunct: 2014; 12 years ago
- Fate: Acquired by Chemical Financial Corporation
- Headquarters: Traverse City, Michigan
- Key people: Daniel W. Terpsma, CEO

Northwestern Bank was a community bank based in Traverse City, Michigan that served northern Michigan. In 2014, it was acquired by Chemical Financial Corporation.

== History ==
The bank was established in 1955.

From 2000 to 2013, Harry C. Calcutt III served as CEO of the bank. During that period, the bank established its largest lending relationship with Nielson Entities, a real estate and oil conglomerate. Amid the Great Recession, Nielson Entities defaulted on their loans. In August 2013, the Federal Deposit Insurance Corporation (FDIC) removed Calcutt and two other executives from their corporate positions, prohibiting them from future work in the banking sector and assessing civil fines. The government alleged that the bank's negotiations with Nielson Entities violated its internal loan policy and involved making false statements to the board of directors and federal government. In Calcutt v. FDIC (2025), the United States Supreme Court reversed a Sixth Circuit decision affirming the FDIC's penalties, leaving him under continued investigation.

On October 31, 2014, CEO Daniel W. Terpsma oversaw the bank's acquisition by the Chemical Financial Corporation for $121 million in cash, which has been further merged into the TCF Financial Corporation.
