= FDA v. Wages and White Lion Investments, L.L.C. =

- Supreme Court of the United States

Argued December 2, 2024 Decided April 2, 2025
- Full case name: Food and Drug Administration v. Wages and White Lion Investments, L.L.C., dba Triton Distribution, et al.
- Docket no.: 23-1038
- Citations: 604 U.S. 542 (more)
- Argument: Oral argument
- Decision: Opinion

Case history
- Prior: Stay pending review granted, 16 F.4th 1130 (5th Cir. 2021); petitions for review denied, 41 F.4th 427 (5th Cir. 2022); FDA denial orders set aside, 90 F.4th 357 (5th Cir. 2024) (en banc); cert. granted (July 2, 2024)

Holding
- The FDA's denial of authorization to market flavored electronic cigarettes was not arbitrary and capricious

Court membership
- Chief Justice John Roberts Associate Justices Clarence Thomas · Samuel Alito; Sonia Sotomayor · Elena Kagan; Neil Gorsuch · Brett Kavanaugh; Amy Coney Barrett · Ketanji Brown Jackson

Case opinions
- Majority: Alito, joined by unanimous
- Concurrence: Sotomayor

Laws applied
- Administrative Procedure Act

FDA v. Wages and White Lion Investments, L.L.C., 604 U.S. 542 (2025), is a United States Supreme Court decision which held that the Food and Drug Administration's denial of authorization to market flavored electronic cigarette products was not arbitrary and capricious under the Administrative Procedure Act (APA).

== Background ==
Two makers of electronic cigarette liquids, Wages and White Lion Investments (doing business as Triton Distribution) and Vapetasia, applied to the Food and Drug Administration in 2020 for authorization to market their flavors, which have names like "Suicide Bunny Mother's Milk and Cookies" and "Iced Pineapple Express". The FDA denied these applications, finding no evidence that the flavors' potential benefit to adult smokers did not outweigh the risk to youth.

In January 2024, an en banc panel of the Fifth Circuit voted 10–6 in favor of the companies, setting aside the denial orders. On July 2, 2024, the Supreme Court agreed to hear the FDA's appeal to resolve circuit conflict.

== Supreme Court ==
Recognizing that the Family Smoking Prevention and Tobacco Control Act granted broad power over tobacco products to the FDA, Associate Justice Samuel Alito wrote for a unanimous Supreme Court in reversing the Fifth Circuit's decision. Given that this act explicitly requires the FDA to assess the likelihood that tobacco marketing will reduce tobacco usage, the Supreme Court declined to fault the agency for abandoning its initial inclusion of marketing plans in the nonbinding guidance it provided. Courts "must exercise appropriate deference" and cannot "substitute their own judgment for that of the agency", Alito said. Also, the FDA did not challenge this part of the Fifth Circuit decision. Instead, the agency argued that consideration of the marketing plans would not have made a difference.

In SEC v. Chenery Corp. (1943) and Calcutt v. FDIC (2023), the Supreme Court required courts to assess discretionary regulatory decisions using the same standards originally used by that agency. The Court said the Fifth Circuit read Calcutt too broadly:

Judge Friendly accurately captured the core of the remand rule when he wrote, "[w]here the agency has rested decision on an unsustainable reason, the court should generally reverse and remand even though it discerns a possibility, even a strong one, that by another course of reasoning the agency might come to the same result".

The Court vacated the Fifth Circuit decision and remanded to the court to reconsider remanding back to the agency.

=== Concurrence ===
Associate Justice Sonia Sotomayor wrote a concurring opinion reiterating that failure of these companies to provide scientific evidence that their products would not entice underage use was dispositive, making the change-in-position doctrine irrelevant.

Justice Elena Kagan said the agency had already determined that the non-tobacco flavors were disproportionately attractive to children.

== Reaction ==
Ian Millhiser said Fifth Circuit judge Andy Oldham's decision was "truly shoddy work" that was "riddled with very basic factual errors".

President-elect Donald Trump vowed to "save vaping" in a TruthSocial post.

== See also ==
- FDA v. Brown & Williamson Tobacco Corp.
- Family Smoking Prevention and Tobacco Control Act
