= Dupree v. Younger =

- Supreme Court of the United States

Decided May 25, 2023
- Full case name: Dupree v. Younger
- Docket no.: 22-210
- Citations: 598 U.S. ___ (more)

Holding
- A post-trial motion under Federal Rule of Civil Procedure 50 is not required to preserve for appellate review a purely legal issue resolved at summary judgment.

Court membership
- Chief Justice John Roberts Associate Justices Clarence Thomas · Samuel Alito; Sonia Sotomayor · Elena Kagan; Neil Gorsuch · Brett Kavanaugh; Amy Coney Barrett · Ketanji Brown Jackson

Case opinion
- Majority: Barrett, joined by unanimous

Laws applied
- Fed. R. Civ. P. 50

Dupree v. Younger, 598 U.S. 729 (2023), was a United States Supreme Court case in which the Court held that a post-trial motion under Federal Rule of Civil Procedure 50 is not required to preserve for appellate review a purely legal issue resolved at summary judgment.

== See also ==
- Ortiz v. Jordan
