= Ciminelli v. United States =

- Supreme Court of the United States

Argued November 28, 2022 Decided May 11, 2023
- Full case name: Louis Ciminelli v. United States, et al.
- Docket no.: 21-1170
- Citations: 598 U.S. 306 (more)
- Argument: Oral argument
- Opinion announcement: Opinion announcement

Case history
- Prior: United States v. Percoco: 13 F. 4th 158 (2d Cir. 2021); 16-CR-776 (VEC) (S.D.N.Y. Dec. 11, 2017)

Questions presented
- 1. Is the "right to control" theory a valid reason for criminal liability under federal wire fraud law?; 2. If not, can the conviction still stand on another theory?

Holding
- 1. No. Not being rooted in a traditional property right, the "right to control" cannot be used to criminally convict someone.; 2. No.

Court membership
- Chief Justice John Roberts Associate Justices Clarence Thomas · Samuel Alito; Sonia Sotomayor · Elena Kagan; Neil Gorsuch · Brett Kavanaugh; Amy Coney Barrett · Ketanji Brown Jackson

Case opinions
- Majority: Thomas, joined by unanimous
- Concurrence: Alito

Laws applied
- Title 18 United States Code, Chapter 63 Federal Rules of Criminal Procedure

Ciminelli v. United States, (Note: Pronunciation in the IPA: /tʃimiˈnɛlli/) 598 U.S. 306 (2023), is a decision by the Supreme Court of the United States that rejected the "right-to-control" theory as a valid basis for convictions under the federal wire fraud statute, 18 U.S.C. § 1343. In the six months after the Ciminelli decision, two out of twelve appeals up to that point making arguments based on it succeeded.

== Background ==
In 2012, in an attempt to encourage development in Buffalo, then-Governor of New York Andrew Cuomo announced the Buffalo Billion project in his annual State of the State address. This scheme aimed to invest one billion US dollars in the economy of Buffalo, primarily via green energy projects such as solar panel factories.

A handful of people connected closely to each other dominated the process of planning, building and promoting the majority of Buffalo Billion projects. Some were developers who had contributed to Cuomo's campaign. The New York Times wrote about the project on May 24, 2016:

…federal investigators' interest seems to lie less with whether the people of Buffalo will ultimately benefit than with those who already have: a tangle of well-connected players — including developers and frequent donors to the governor — who have feasted on Buffalo Billion money.

As of May 15, 2023, the last remaining company started with its funding, Athenex, filed for Chapter 11 bankruptcy.

Alain Kaloyeros, an American physicist, was then CEO and president of the SUNY Polytechnic Institute, and became instrumental to deciding how the funds from the project would be allocated. He, along with others charged, including construction contracting firm owner Louis Ciminelli, are alleged to have bribed Cuomo aide Joseph Percoco and engaged in bid rigging.

Percoco was accused of taking at least US$315,000 in bribes; Kaloyeros was alleged to be paying US$25,000 monthly to a lobbyist for his help in rigging the bids. In March 2018, a federal jury in Manhattan convicted Percoco on felony charges of honest services fraud and soliciting bribes from Competitive Power Ventures, an energy company, and COR Development, a real estate developer.

For his part, Louis Ciminelli was convicted of wire fraud for his role in the scheme which ensured his construction company, LPCiminelli, would be awarded a contract from public infrastructure funds. Percoco was convicted in another case, Percoco v. United States.

== Case ==
Louis Ciminelli appealed his conviction to the Supreme Court of the United States, arguing that the "right to control" theory used to convict him under federal wire fraud statutes was not a valid basis for such a conviction. The "right to control" theory, as elucidated by the United States Court of Appeals for the Second Circuit, posited that depriving a party of potentially valuable economic information could constitute a scheme to defraud.

=== Decision ===
On May 11, 2023, the Supreme Court unanimously ruled in favor of Ciminelli. In the opinion, authored by Justice Clarence Thomas, the Court held that the "right to control" is not a valid basis for federal wire fraud charges because it is not rooted in a traditional common law property right. The Court emphasized that wire fraud must involve a scheme to fraudulently obtain money or other tangible property, not merely interfere with a party's right to make informed economic decisions.

== Impact ==
In the six months after the Ciminelli decision, two out of twelve appeals up to that point making arguments based on it succeeded.

== See also ==
- McNally v. United States (1987)
- Cleveland v. United States (2000)
- Skilling v. United States (2010)
