= MOAC Mall Holdings LLC v. Transform Holdco LLC =

- Supreme Court of the United States

Decided April 19, 2023
- Full case name: MOAC Mall Holdings LLC v. Transform Holdco LLC
- Docket no.: 21-1270
- Citations: 598 U.S. ___ (more)

Holding
- Section 363(m) of the Bankruptcy Code, which restricts the effects of certain successful appeals of judicially authorized sales or leases of bankruptcy-estate property, is not a jurisdictional provision.

Court membership
- Chief Justice John Roberts Associate Justices Clarence Thomas · Samuel Alito; Sonia Sotomayor · Elena Kagan; Neil Gorsuch · Brett Kavanaugh; Amy Coney Barrett · Ketanji Brown Jackson

Case opinion
- Majority: Jackson, joined by unanimous

MOAC Mall Holdings LLC v. Transform Holdco LLC, 598 U.S. 288 (2023), was a United States Supreme Court case in which the Court held that Section 363(m) of the Bankruptcy Code, which restricts the effects of certain successful appeals of judicially authorized sales or leases of bankruptcy-estate property, is not a jurisdictional provision.

== Background ==
During the Chapter 11 bankruptcy of Sears, Roebuck and Co., Sears sold most of its pre-bankruptcy assets to Transform Holdco LLC, including the right to designate to whom a lease between Sears and MOAC Mall Holdings LLC should be assigned. MOAC leases space to tenants at the Minnesota Mall of America. The agreement with Transform required Sears to assign the lease to any assignee duly designated by Transform. When Transform later designated the Mall of America lease for assignment to its wholly owned subsidiary, MOAC filed an objection with the Bankruptcy Court, arguing that Sears had not shown "adequate assurance of future performance by the assignee" as the Code requires.

The Bankruptcy Court disagreed with MOAC's adequate-assurance argument and issued an order authorizing the lease assignment (Assignment Order). The Code contemplates that interested parties like MOAC may appeal such an order, but the effect of a successful appeal is limited by §363(m), which states that "[t]he reversal or modification on appeal of an authorization under [§363(b) or §363(c)] of a sale or lease of property does not affect the validity of a sale or lease under such authorization to an entity that purchased or leased such property in good faith... unless such authorization and such sale or lease were stayed pending appeal." Fearing the implications of §363(m) on an appeal, MOAC sought to stay the Assignment Order. The Bankruptcy Court denied the stay, reasoning that an appeal of the Assignment Order did not qualify as an appeal of an authorization described in §363(m), and emphasizing Transform's explicit representation that it would not invoke §363(m) against MOAC's appeal. After the Assignment Order became effective, Sears assigned the lease to Transform's designee, and MOAC appealed the Assignment Order.

The federal district court sided with MOAC on the adequate-assurance issue. Transform filed for rehearing, arguing that §363(m) deprived the district court of jurisdiction. The district court determined that Second Circuit Court of Appeals precedent bound it to treat §363(m) as jurisdictional and dismissed the appeal. The Second Circuit affirmed.
