= Lora v. United States =

- Supreme Court of the United States

Argued March 28, 2023 Decided June 16, 2023
- Full case name: Efrain Lora v. United States
- Docket no.: 22-49
- Citations: 599 U.S. 453 (more)
- Argument: Oral argument
- Opinion announcement: Opinion announcement

Questions presented
- Whether 18 U.S.C. § 924(c)(l)(D)(ii), which provides that "no term of imprisonment imposed ... under this subsection shall run concurrently with any other term of imprisonment," is triggered when a defendant is convicted and sentenced under 18 U.S.C. § 924(j).

Holding
- Section 924(c)(1)(D)(ii)’s bar on concurrent sentences does not govern a sentence for a §924(j) conviction. A §924(j) sentence therefore can run either concurrently with or consecutively to another sentence.

Court membership
- Chief Justice John Roberts Associate Justices Clarence Thomas · Samuel Alito; Sonia Sotomayor · Elena Kagan; Neil Gorsuch · Brett Kavanaugh; Amy Coney Barrett · Ketanji Brown Jackson

Case opinion
- Majority: Jackson, joined by unanimous

Laws applied
- 18 U.S.C. § 924

Lora v. United States, 599 U.S. 453 (2023), was a United States Supreme Court case regarding Title 18 of the United States Code, the main federal criminal code of the United States. The Court held that a provision of one subsection of Title 18 barring concurrent sentences does not govern sentences pursuant to a different part of the same section.

== Background ==
Efrain Lora was a drug trafficker in the Bronx. In 2002, Lora and his associates, including Oscar Palmer, conspired to kill a rival trafficker who had threatened to kill Palmer. Palmer, along with a fellow associate, were driven to the house of the rival trafficker and subsequently killed him. Over ten years later, federal prosecutors indicted Lora and his associates in the United States District Court for the Southern District of New York under 18 U.S.C. § 924(j) for possessing or using a firearm "during and in relation to, and in furtherance of, a conspiracy to distribute cocaine, and … us[ing] the firearm to cause the death” of a person. Additionally, Lora was indicted under 18 U.S.C. §§ 841(b)(1)(A), 846, and 848(e)(1)(A) for conspiring to traffic drugs and for causing a homicide in furtherance of that conspiracy.

At trial, Lora was found guilty on all counts. However, the judge vacated the § 848 charge due to insufficient evidence proving the quantity of drugs. At sentencing, the judge insisted that § 924(j) requires that the sentences for the remaining charges be served consecutively. The District Court ultimately sentenced Lora to 30 years of imprisonment: 25 years on the drug-distribution-conspiracy count and, consecutively, five years on the § 924(j) count. Lora also received five years of supervised release. The United States Court of Appeals for the Second Circuit affirmed, which had established a precedent in its case law that 924(j) "incorporates the entirety of [subsection 924(c)],” including the bar on consecutive sentences at § 924(c)(1)(D)(ii).

== Supreme Court ==
On July 15, 2022, Lora petitioned the Supreme Court to hear his case. On December 9, 2022, the Court granted certiorari. Oral arguments were held on March 28, 2023. On June 16, 2023, the Supreme Court unanimously vacated the Second Circuit's judgment and remanded.

In an opinion authored by Justice Ketanji Brown Jackson, the Court held that Section 924(c)(1)(D)(ii)'s bar on concurrent sentences does not govern a sentence for a § 924(j) conviction. Lora's sentence could therefore run concurrently or consecutively with another sentence.

Sections 924(c) and 924(j), Jackson points out, criminalize the use, carrying, and possession of firearms in connection with certain crimes. Subsections (c) and (j) both describe different offenses and their corresponding penalties. However, subsection (c) contains a provision requiring consecutive sentences, while subsection (j) does not. Subsection (c)'s mandate does not apply to crimes existing wholly outside of it in subsection (j). Additionally, Jackson argues, Congress did not intend to incorporate § 924(c) as a whole into § 924(j). She points out that the crimes outlined in subsection (c) defines more serious offenses than subsection (j), and therefore that one subsection having more harsh sentence requirements than another is plausible.
