= New York v. New Jersey =

- Supreme Court of the United States

Argued March 1, 2023 Decided April 18, 2023
- Full case name: New York v. New Jersey
- Docket no.: 22O156
- Citations: 598 U.S. 218 (more)
- Argument: Oral argument
- Opinion announcement: Opinion announcement

Holding
- New Jersey has the unilateral right to withdraw from the Waterfront Commission of New York Harbor.

Court membership
- Chief Justice John Roberts Associate Justices Clarence Thomas · Samuel Alito; Sonia Sotomayor · Elena Kagan; Neil Gorsuch · Brett Kavanaugh; Amy Coney Barrett · Ketanji Brown Jackson

Case opinion
- Majority: Kavanaugh, joined by unanimous

Laws applied
- Compact Clause

New York v. New Jersey, 598 U.S. 218 (2023), is a United States Supreme Court case in which the Court held that New Jersey had the right to unilaterally withdraw from the Waterfront Commission of New York Harbor.

== Background ==
In 1953, New York and New Jersey entered a compact establishing the Waterfront Commission of New York Harbor, a bistate commission for regulating and enforcing the law in the Port of New York and New Jersey shared by the states. For approximately 60 years, the states collaborated through the commission to combat lawlessness and disinfect the port of charlatans and malign opportunists. However, by the 2010s, New Jersey lost interest in continued participation in the commission, as it became irrelevant and costly in their view. In 2018, the New Jersey Legislature passed, and Governor of New Jersey Chris Christie subsequently signed, legislation authorizing the state's withdrawal from the commission. New York moved to enjoin the withdrawal, arguing that New Jersey could not unilaterally withdraw from the compact. The Supreme Court temporarily enjoined the withdrawal, and exercised its original jurisdiction to adjudicate the case.

== Supreme Court ==
In a unanimous decision, Justice Kavanaugh delivered the opinion of the Court, holding that New Jersey had the right to unilaterally withdraw from the compact. Two important principles underlay the Court's decision: (1) Interstate compacts are viewed as contracts, and are interpreted using the procedures thereof. (2) Waiver of sovereign immunity should not be treated lightly, and any expansion of such waiver must be undertaken diligently and meticulously.

The first principle establishes the framework for interpreting the compact. Absent express instructions, contracts may be terminated by any party at any time the party sees fit. Thus, given the compact's silence regarding unilateral withdrawal, a state may unilaterally withdraw from an interstate compact. State sovereignty principles, which look askance at any diminishment of state self-governance, support this conclusion. However, the Court maintained that some compacts are not subject to the same analysis, for example, compacts conveying property interests, compacts not indefinite in their validity, or compacts with express instructions as to withdrawal. As the Court explained, the circumstances of such compacts suggest or directly express the intent of the party, and thus, in those cases, the parties’ intent should control.
