= Twitter, Inc. v. Taamneh =

- Supreme Court of the United States

Argued February 22, 2023 Decided May 18, 2023
- Full case name: Twitter, Inc., et al., v. Mehier Taamneh, et al.
- Docket no.: 21-1496
- Citations: 598 U.S. 471 (more)
- Argument: Oral argument
- Opinion announcement: Opinion announcement

Holding
- Respondents' allegations that Twitter aided and abetted ISIS in its terrorist attack on the Reina nightclub fail to state a claim under 18 U.S.C. § 2333(d)(2).

Court membership
- Chief Justice John Roberts Associate Justices Clarence Thomas · Samuel Alito; Sonia Sotomayor · Elena Kagan; Neil Gorsuch · Brett Kavanaugh; Amy Coney Barrett · Ketanji Brown Jackson

Case opinions
- Majority: Thomas, joined by unanimous
- Concurrence: Jackson

Laws applied
- Justice Against Sponsors of Terrorism Act

Twitter, Inc. v. Taamneh, 598 U.S. 471 (2023), was a case of the Supreme Court of the United States. The case considered whether Internet service providers are liable for "aiding and abetting" a designated foreign terrorist organization in an "act of international terrorism", on account of recommending such content posted by users, under Section 2333 of the Antiterrorism Act of 1992, as amended by the Justice Against Sponsors of Terrorism Act in 2016. Along with Gonzalez v. Google LLC, Taamneh is one of two cases where social media companies are accused of aiding and abetting terrorism in violation of the law. The cases were decided together in a ruling by the United States Court of Appeals for the Ninth Circuit, which ruled that Taamneh's case could proceed. The cases challenge the broad liability immunity for hosting and recommending terrorist content that websites have enjoyed.

The unanimous court ruled in May 2023 that the charges brought against Twitter and other companies were not permissible under the Antiterrorism Act, and did not address the Section 230 question. This decision also supported the Court's per curiam decision in Gonzalez returning that case to the lower court for review in light of the Twitter decision.

== History ==
Jordanian citizen Nawras Alassaf died in 2017 during an Islamic State-affiliated attack in Istanbul. Alassaf's family sued Twitter, Google and Facebook arguing that the companies failed to control terrorist content on their sites. They won at the district court level.

Twitter appealed the district court ruling to the Ninth Circuit arguing that the lower court decision improperly expanded the scope of the Anti-Terrorism Act, 18 U.S.C. § 2333.

On appeal, the Ninth Circuit did not consider protections under Section 230 in the case and affirmed the lower court ruling that stated that Twitter, Google, and Facebook could be liable. Twitter subsequently appealed to the Supreme Court.

== Supreme Court ==
The Supreme Court granted certiorari for the case in October 2022, alongside the related case Gonzalez v. Google LLC. Free speech organizations like the Center for Democracy and Technology, the American Civil Liberties Union, the Electronic Frontier Foundation, and the Knight First Amendment Institute at Columbia University, as well as technology industry trade groups like the Computer & Communications Industry Association, and the US Chamber of Commerce filed amicus briefs in support of the petitioner. The Anti-Defamation League, Senator Chuck Grassley, former US national security officials, and retired American military generals filed amicus briefs in support of the respondent.

The Court heard oral arguments in Twitter on February 22, 2023. The questions and debate among the Justices and counsels for the parties focused more on the language of the Anti-Terrorism Act, particularly the language of "knowingly providing substantial assistance" to terrorism organisms, and what role Twitter and other services had in regards. Observers to the Court believed that the Justices were not looking for broad changes to the Anti-Terrorism Act or Section 230 that would upend the Internet.

The Court gave its decision on May 18, 2023. The unanimous opinion, authored by Justice Clarence Thomas, found that "the allegations are insufficient to establish that these defendants aided and abetted ISIS in carrying out the relevant attack" under the Anti-Terrorism Act, as there was a "lack of concrete nexus" between the tech companies and terrorist groups like ISIS. The opinion purposely did not consider the impact of Section 230. Separately, in a per curiam decision, the Court ordered the Gonzalez case back to the Ninth Circuit, requesting that court to consider the case in light of the Twitter decision and making no additional rulings in that case.

Justice Ketanji Brown Jackson wrote a concurrence stating that the decision was "narrow in important respects", and suggested there may be other routes for family to seek relief.

== See also ==
- Force v. Facebook, Inc. (2019)
