= Anti-Terrorism Act of 1987 =

United States Law of 1987

- Long title: A bill to make unlawful the establishment or maintenance within the United States of an office of the Palestine Liberation Organization, and for other purposes.
- Nicknames: Foreign Relations Authorization Act of 1988
- Enacted by: the 100th United States Congress
- Effective: March 21, 1988

Citations
- Public law: Pub. L. 100–204
- Statutes at Large: 101 Stat. 1406

Codification
- Titles amended: 22 U.S.C.: Foreign Relations and Intercourse
- U.S.C. sections created: 22 U.S.C. ch. 61 § 5201 et seq.

Legislative history
- Introduced in the House as H.R. 2548 by Wally Herger (R–CA) on May 28, 1987; Committee consideration by U.S. House Foreign Affairs; Signed into law by President Ronald Reagan on December 22, 1987

Anti-Terrorism Act of 1987 originated in the 100th United States Congress as four articles of anti-terrorism legislation. The United States House of Representatives bill H.R. 2587 was endorsed by eighty cosponsors while the United States Senate bill S. 1203 was endorsed by forty-nine cosponsors of the 100th United States Congress. The Act of Congress designated the Palestine Liberation Organization (PLO) as a terrorist organization, and prohibited the establishment of offices or other facilities at the behest of or to further the interests of the PLO. It also prohibited American citizens from receiving "anything of value except informational material from the PLO".

The Anti-Terrorism Act is Title X of the Foreign Relations Authorization Act of 1988 and 1989. The Foreign Relations Authorization Act was codified as Public Law 100-204 bound as statute 101 Stat. 1331. The United States House bill H.R. 1777 was authorized by the 100th United States Congress and enacted into law by Ronald Reagan on December 22, 1987.

== History ==
=== United States Foreign Policy Statute of 1969 ===
Foreign Assistance Act of 1969, (Pub. L. 91–175, 22 U.S.C. ch. 32, subch. I § 2221), was a United States federal statute enacted into law by the 37th President of the United States Richard Nixon on December 30, 1969. The Act of Congress was the first United States legislative article to acknowledge the Palestine Liberation Organization as a militant force venerating the tactics of terrorism in the Fertile Crescent and Levant geographies of the Eastern Mediterranean or Mediterranean Basin.

==== 22 U.S.C. § 2221 ~ Palestine Refugees; Conditions for Furnishing Assistance ====
International Organizations and Programs

No contributions by the United States shall be made to the United Nations Relief and Works Agency for Palestine Refugees in the Near East except on the condition that the United Nations Relief and Works Agency take all possible measures to assure that no part of the United States contribution shall be used to furnish assistance to any refugee who is receiving military training as a member of the so-called Palestine Liberation Army or any other guerrilla type organization or who has engaged in any act of terrorism.

— Thomas E. Morgan, United States House Representative of Pennsylvania

91st United States Congress - 83 Stat. 805 ~ H.R. 14580
October 29, 1969

== Declaration of the Act ==
Anti-Terrorism Act of 1987 was penned as five sections establishing reprehensible conditions with regards to Palestine Liberation Organization relations and conducting anarchist activities within the United States. The public law is declared as Title X - Anti-Terrorism Act of 1987.

Anti-Terrorism Act of 1987 as short title - 101 Stat. 1406 § 1001

Determinations and Findings - 101 Stat. 1406-1407 § 1002

- By 1985, sixty percent of Middle East terrorism accounted for total international terrorism ― Patterns of Global Terrorism
- Palestine Liberation Organization (PLO) assisted activities in the Achille Lauro hijacking of October 7, 1985
- Palestine Liberation Organization implicated in the fatality of United States ambassador to Lebanon Francis E. Meloy Jr.
- PLO and constituent groups implicated in the fatality of dozens of American citizens abroad
- Palestinian National Covenant issues a governing truth of armed struggle to liberate Palestine
- During April 1987 in Algiers, Palestinian National Council meeting reaffirmed the ideology of the struggle in all its armed forms
- United States Attorney General affirms that various elements of the Palestine Liberation Organization and its allies and affiliates are in the thick of international terror

Determinations - 101 Stat. 1407 § 1002

United States Congress determines the Palestine Liberation Organization and affiliates are a terrorist organization. The anarchist organization poses a peril threat to the interests of the United States, its allies, and international law. The Palestine Liberation Organization should not benefit from operating in the United States.

Prohibitions Regarding the PLO - 101 Stat. 1407 § 1003

For the purpose of the Anti-Terrorism Act of 1987, it is unlawful to further the interests of the Palestine Liberation Organization, any constituent groups, any successor to any of those, and any agents thereof;

(1) To receive anything of value except informational material from the PLO or any of its constituent groups, any successor thereto, or any agents thereof;
(2) To expend funds from the PLO or any of its constituent groups, any successor thereto, or any agents thereof;
(3) Notwithstanding any provision of law to the contrary, to establish or maintain an office, headquarters, premises, or other facilities or establishments within the jurisdiction of the United States at the behest or direction of, or with funds provided by the Palestine Liberation Organization or any of its constituent groups, any successor to any of those, or any agents thereof.

Enforcement - 101 Stat. 1407 § 1004

United States Attorney General shall institute the necessary legal action to effectuate the policies and provisions of this title
Any district court of the United States for a district in which a violation of this title occurs shall have authority, upon petition of relief by the United States Attorney General, to grant injunctive and such other equitable relief as it shall deem necessary to enforce the provisions of this title

Effective Date - 101 Stat. 1407 § 1005

Provisions of this title shall take effect 90 days after the date of enactment of this Act

Termination - 101 Stat. 1407 § 1005

Provisions of this title shall cease to have effect if the President certifies in writing to the' President pro tempore of the Senate and the Speaker of the House that the Palestine Liberation Organization, its agents, or constituent groups thereof no longer practice or support terrorist actions anywhere in the world

== Enactment ==
The Reagan Administration sought to negotiate with Congress to prevent closure of the PLO mission at the United Nations, in fear that doing so would spark worldwide criticism. Legal Advisor to the State Department, Abraham Sofaer, sent a memorandum to Secretary of State George Shultz, explaining that, although the PLO was not legally entitled to an office at the UN, the U.S. should prevent its closure. More specifically, Sofaer's memorandum explained that the legal status of permanent UN observers (like the PLO) was not clarified in the 1947 Headquarters Agreement, meaning that the US could argue it had no legal obligations to treat observer missions with any immunities. However, the memo concluded, closing the PLO mission would run contrary to 40 years of practice under the Agreement.

In a later interview with the New York Times, Sofaer, speaking on behalf of the Administration, said that closing the PLO UN office would violate the 1947 Headquarter Agreements and result in a suit against the United States in the International Court of Justice. He added that the ongoing congressional debate “has the clear implication that Congress does not care if it violates international law.”

Ultimately, despite the Administration's objections. Congress enforced closure of the PLO mission. The New York Times recognized Sofaer as someone who understood the foolishness of this decision:

"Abraham D. Sofaer, the State Department's legal adviser, has understood the serious implications of this political foolishness. He has urged that action be held up, pending a legal ruling, lest American peace efforts in the Middle East be undermined. He sees the risk of damage to the interests of the United States and Israel."

== See also ==
- 1969 Jerusalem bombings
- 1973 Rome airport attacks and hijacking
- 1982 Lebanon War
- 1983 Beirut barracks bombings
- Black September
- Boycotts of Israel
- Entebbe raid
- Intifada
- Israeli Declaration of Independence
- Israeli–Palestinian conflict
- Madrid Conference of 1991
- Munich massacre
- Palestine and the United Nations
- Saudi Embassy Attack in Khartoum
- TWA Flight 840 bombing
- TWA Flight 840 hijacking

=== Associated Statutes of United States ===
- Middle East Peace Facilitation Act of 1993
- Taylor Force Act of 2018

=== Resolutions of United Nations Security Council ===
- United Nations Resolutions concerning Palestine
- United Nations Security Council Resolution 242
- United Nations Security Council Resolution 338
