= Irwin v. Department of Veterans Affairs =

- Supreme Court of the United States

Argued October 1, 1990 Decided December 3, 1990
- Full case name: Shirley W. Irwin, Petitioner v. Department of Veterans Affairs et al.
- Citations: 498 U.S. 89 (more) 111 S.Ct. 453, 112 L.Ed.2d 435
- Argument: Oral argument

Case history
- Prior: 874 F.2d 1092 (CA5 1989)

Holding
- Statutes of limitations in actions against the Government are subject to the same rebuttable presumption of equitable tolling applicable to suits against private defendants.

Court membership
- Chief Justice William Rehnquist Associate Justices Byron White · Thurgood Marshall; Harry Blackmun · John P. Stevens; Sandra Day O'Connor · Antonin Scalia; Anthony Kennedy · David Souter

Case opinions
- Majority: Rehnquist, joined by Blackmun, O'Connor, Scalia, Kennedy
- Concurrence: White (in part and in judgment), joined by Marshall
- Concur/dissent: Stevens
- Souter took no part in the consideration or decision of the case.

Irwin v. Department of Veterans Affairs, 498 U.S. 89 (1990), was a 1990 United States Supreme Court case concerning tolling of statute of limitations in litigation against the federal government. The Court held that suits against the government were subject to the same presumption of equitable tolling as are suits against private parties.
