= Smith v. United States (2023) =

- Supreme Court of the United States

Argued March 28, 2023 Decided June 15, 2023
- Full case name: Timothy J. Smith v. United States
- Docket no.: 21-1576
- Citations: 599 U.S. 236 (more)
- Argument: Oral argument
- Opinion announcement: Opinion announcement

Questions presented
- Whether the proper remedy for the government's failure to prove venue is an acquittal barring re-prosecution of the offense, as the Fifth and Eighth Circuits have held, or whether instead the government may re-try the defendant for the same offense in a different venue, as the Sixth, Ninth, Tenth, and Eleventh Circuits have held.

Holding
- The Constitution permits the retrial of a defendant following a trial in an improper venue conducted before a jury drawn from the wrong district.

Court membership
- Chief Justice John Roberts Associate Justices Clarence Thomas · Samuel Alito; Sonia Sotomayor · Elena Kagan; Neil Gorsuch · Brett Kavanaugh; Amy Coney Barrett · Ketanji Brown Jackson

Case opinion
- Majority: Alito, joined by unanimous

Laws applied
- U.S. Const. Art. III, amends. V, VI

Smith v. United States, 599 U.S. 236 (2023), is a United States Supreme Court case pertaining to Article III and the Sixth Amendment. The Court held that a defendant may be retried following a jury trial conducted in the improper venue before a jury drawn from the incorrect district.

== Background ==
Timothy J. Smith is a software engineer who resides in Mobile, Alabama (which is situated within the Southern District of Alabama). An avid fisherman, Smith would often fish in the Gulf of Mexico. In 2018, Smith discovered StrikeLines, a Florida company that used sonar equipment to detect artificial reefs constructed to attract fish. StrikeLines would sell the coordinates of these reefs to interested parties. StrikeLines' offices were located in Pensacola (which is situated within the Northern District of Florida) but their web servers were located in Orlando (which is situated within the Middle District of Florida).

Smith used a web application to harvest StrikeLines' data and invited others to contact him and "see what ree[f] coordinates StrikeLines had discovered". When contacted by StrikeLines, Smith offered to remove social media posts regarding the company on the condition that, in exchange, they disclose to him the coordinates of certain "deep grouper spots" that he had been unable to obtain from the website. These negotiations eventually failed, and StrikeLines contacted law-enforcement.

== Lower court ==
Smith was indicted in the Northern District of Florida on charges of, among others, theft of trade secrets. Before trial, he moved to dismiss the charges for lack of venue, citing Article III's Venue Clause, and the Sixth Amendment's Vicinage Clause. Smith's home was situated within the Southern District of Alabama, and StrikeLines' web servers (where the theft was alleged to have taken place) was situated within the Middle District of Florida. The District Court concluded that factual disputes regarding venue were for the jury to resolve, and denied Smith's motion. After being convicted, Smith moved for a judgment of acquittal based on improper venue, which was denied.

On appeal, the United States Court of Appeals for the Eleventh Circuit determined that the venue for the trade secrets charge was improper, but concluded that this error did not bar reprosecution, saying that the "Double Jeopardy [C]lause is not implicated by a retrial in a proper venue".

== Supreme Court ==
On June 16, 2022, Smith petitioned the Supreme Court to hear his case. On December 13, 2022, the Court granted certiorari. On June 15, 2023, Justice Samuel Alito issued a unanimous opinion affirming the Eleventh Circuit.

Justice Alito begins his opinion by outlining the Court's longstanding rule stating that defendants who have had their convictions reversed may typically be retried on the same charges. The Court has recognized one exception to this rule: violations of the Speedy Trial Clause, since if the first trial violated this right then no subsequent trial could possibly be more speedy.

Text and tradition, Alito says, do not provide support for granting another exception to the rule in a case like Smith's. The text of the Venue Clause reads:

Trial of all Crimes . . . shall be held in the State where the . . . Crimes shall have been committed.

Alito reasons that the purpose of the clause is not to prevent the infliction of harm upon a defendant who has undergone trial in an improper venue, for any criminal trial presents unique burdens and hardships. Additionally, criticizes Smith's argument that the clause is intended to prevent logistical difficulties present when a case is tried in the improper venue. He says:

For example, a resident of New York charged with committing a crime during a short visit to Hawaii may be tried in Hawaii under the Venue Clause even though that trial may be very inconvenient. Equally telling, the Clause would preclude trial for that crime in New York unless it somehow extended to the State.

Nor, he argues, does the text of the Vicinage Clause support Smith's contentions. It specifies that jurors in a trial must be drawn from the place where the crime is alleged to have been committed. It is, however, more narrow than the Venue Clause, as the Vicinage Clause demands that jurors be drawn from the state and district where the crime has taken place. Alito argues that any remedy offered by the text of the Vicinage Clause must therefore be at least as narrow as any remedy offered by the Venue Clause.

Alito goes on to argue that the history regarding the two clauses does not support Smith's assertion that they should be exempt from the retrial rule. In his survey of the common law (and of the years immediately following the adoption of the Constitution), he finds no example of a court barring retrial based on a successful venue or vicinage objection. Courts in fact uniformly allowed retrials amid such objections. Alito concludes his opinion by stating that the Double Jeopardy Clause does not preclude the possibility for retrial in the case of venue or vicinage objections.
