= Ohio Adjutant General's Department v. Federal Labor Relations Authority =

- Supreme Court of the United States

Decided May 18, 2023
- Full case name: Ohio Adjutant General's Department v. Federal Labor Relations Authority
- Docket no.: 21-1454
- Citations: 598 U.S. 449 (more)

Holding
- The Federal Labor Relations Authority had jurisdiction over a State National Guard labor dispute because a state National Guard acts as a federal agency for the purpose of the Federal Service Labor-Management Relations Statute when it hires and supervises dual-status technicians serving in their civilian role.

Court membership
- Chief Justice John Roberts Associate Justices Clarence Thomas · Samuel Alito; Sonia Sotomayor · Elena Kagan; Neil Gorsuch · Brett Kavanaugh; Amy Coney Barrett · Ketanji Brown Jackson

Case opinions
- Majority: Thomas, joined by Roberts, Sotomayor, Kagan, Kavanaugh, Barrett, Jackson
- Dissent: Alito, joined by Gorsuch

Laws applied
- Federal Service Labor-Management Relations Statute

Ohio Adjutant General's Department v. Federal Labor Relations Authority, 598 U.S. 449 (2023), was a United States Supreme Court case in which the Court held that the Federal Labor Relations Authority had jurisdiction over a state National Guard labor dispute because a state National Guard acts as a federal agency for the purpose of the Federal Service Labor-Management Relations Statute when it hires and supervises dual-status technicians serving in their civilian role.

== See also ==
- Babcock v. Kijakazi
