= Texas v. New Jersey =

Texas v New Jersey
- Supreme Court of the United States

Argued November 9, 1964 Decided February 1, 1965
- Full case name: Texas v. New Jersey et al.
- Citations: 380 U.S. 518 (more) 85 S. Ct. 1136; 14 L. Ed. 2d 49

Case history
- Prior: 379 U.S. 674 (1965)

Holding
- Jurisdiction to escheat abandoned intangible personal property lies in the State of the creditor's last known address on the debtor's books and records or, absent such address or an escheat law, in the State of corporate domicile - but subject to later escheat to the former State if it proves such an address to be within its borders and provides for escheat of such property.

Court membership
- Chief Justice Earl Warren Associate Justices Hugo Black · William O. Douglas; Tom C. Clark · John M. Harlan II; William J. Brennan Jr. · Potter Stewart; Byron White · Arthur Goldberg

Case opinions
- Majority: Black, joined by Warren, Douglas, Clark, Harlan, Brennan, White, Goldberg
- Dissent: Stewart

Texas v. New Jersey, 380 U.S. 518 (1965), is a United States Supreme Court decision handed down on February 1, 1965. Concerning the authority of the state to escheat, or take title to, unclaimed personal property, the Court was petitioned, under its power of original jurisdiction, to adjudicate a disagreement between three states, Texas, New Jersey, and the Commonwealth of Pennsylvania, over which state had the jurisdiction to escheat intangible personal property, such as uncashed checks. Recognizing the lack of any extant constitutional or statutory formula to decide jurisdiction, the Warren Court accepted the case, assigning a Special Master to compile evidence and recommend a solution that the states could use for similar cases in the future. Adopting the Special Master's suggestions, the Court, in a decision authored by Justice Hugo Black, ruled that the authority to escheat intangible personal property lay with the state of the creditor's last known address, rather than the state of the debtor's incorporation or headquarters, a formula used in previous cases.

== The players ==
The case for the plaintiff was argued before the court by W. O. Shultz II, the Assistant Attorney General of Texas. He was joined by Waggoner Carr, Attorney General of Texas. The three defendants, the state of New Jersey, the Commonwealth of Pennsylvania, and the Sun Oil Company, were represented by Charles J. Kehoe, Deputy Attorney General of New Jersey, joined by Arthur J. Sills, Attorney General of New Jersey, and Theodore I. Botter, First Assistant Attorney General of New Jersey, Joseph H. Resnick, Assistant Attorney General of Pennsylvania, and Augustus S. Ballard, representing the Sun Oil Company.

Fred M. Burns, Assistant Attorney General of Florida, represented the state as an intervenor, joined by James W. Kynes, Attorney General of Florida, and Jack W. Harnett, Assistant Attorney General. Ralph W. Oman, represented the Life Insurance Association of America as an amicus curiae.

To gather evidence and present a report and recommendations to all parties, the Court appointed the Honorable Walter A. Huxman, former Kansas Governor and U.S. Federal Judge, as Special Master for the case.

== Background ==
The case revolved around the question of what state had the right to escheat, or take title to, unclaimed intangible personal property, and on what grounds. While common law had for years recognized that tangible property, real or personal, could only be claimed by the state in which the property was located, there had never been a set rule for the escheat of intangible personal property, such as debts. By 1964, the Sun Oil Co. had on the books of its Texas offices intangible personal property, mainly checks unclaimed or uncashed by creditors, worth $26,461.65. These payments, which included unclaimed checks for wages and expenses, payments to suppliers or vendors, royalty checks for oil-and-gas producing lands, and payment for fractional mineral interests, dated from 7 to 40 years before the case was presented, and were owed to “approximately 1,730 small creditors” whose last known address was in Texas.

== Case history ==
While the state of Texas argued that “this intangible property should be treated as situated in Texas, so as to permit that State to escheat,” two other areas, the state of New Jersey, where Sun Oil Co. was incorporated, and the Commonwealth of Pennsylvania, where their corporate offices were located, argued for their own right to escheat. Since the Supreme Court had ruled three years previously, in Western Union Co. v Pennsylvania (1961), that one state had “no power to render a judgment of escheat which would bar...any other State from escheating the same property”, the state of Texas petitioned the court, under Art. III, 2, of the Constitution, which gave the Court original jurisdiction over cases between states, for a definitive declaration of rights on the subject. Noting that “since the States separately are without constitutional power to provide a rule to settle this interstate controversy and since there is no applicable federal statute,” the Court accepted the case, arguing that it was their responsibility “in the exercise of our original jurisdiction to adopt a rule which will settle the question of which State will be allowed to escheat this intangible property.”

== The arguments ==
The plaintiff, the state of Texas, argued that the State with “the most significant ‘contacts’ with the debt should be allowed exclusive jurisdiction to escheat it,” and that under this test the state of Texas had the best claim to jurisdiction over the unclaimed property. The plaintiffs also argued that Texas had a superior claim to escheat on the grounds that at least the part of the intangible obligations were “royalties, rents, and mineral proceeds derived from land located in Texas.” The state of New Jersey countered with the argument that the State with power to escheat was the state that was the domicile of the debtor, in this case New Jersey, where Sun Oil Co. was incorporated. Pennsylvania, in a similar vein to New Jersey, argued that it was the location of the debtor's “principal offices,” rather than state of incorporation, that had jurisdiction to escheat the property.

The state of Florida, given leave to act as an intervenor due to its claim on intangible property Sun Oil Co. owed to creditors whose last known address was in Florida, argued that the debt was the property of the creditor, not the debtor, and that “fairness among the States requires that the right and power to escheat the debt should be accorded to the State of the creditor's last known address as shown by the debtor's books and records.”

== The decision ==
In a decision authored by Justice Hugo Black, the Court adopted the finding of the Special Master assigned to the case, whose report agreed with the argument put forward by the state of Florida, namely that the power to escheat should reside in the state of the creditor's last known address, rather than any physical address associated with the debtor. Addressing the position of the state of Texas, the Court categorically rejected the “contacts” argument, declaring that “it is simply a phrase suggesting that this Court should examine the circumstances surrounding each particular item of escheatable property on its own peculiar facts and then try to make a difficult, often quite subjective, decision as to which State's claim to those pennies or dollars seems stronger than another's.” The adoption of such a standard Black wrote “might in the end create so much uncertainty and threaten so much expensive litigation that the States might find that they would lose more in litigation expenses than they might gain in escheats.”

While noting that the plan offered by the state of New Jersey, that power to escheat should reside in the debtor's state of incorporation, had the “obvious virtues of clarity and ease of application,” the Court concluded “that in deciding a question which should be determined primarily on principles of fairness, it would too greatly exalt a minor factor to permit escheat of obligations incurred all over the country by the State in which the debtor happened to incorporate itself.” Addressing Pennsylvania's argument that jurisdiction resided in the state of the debtor's “principal offices,” Black's decision noted the inherently subjective nature of terms such as “main offices”. “principal offices,” and “principal place of business.” Arguing that the determination of this locale would require case-by-case examination, the Court rejected the Commonwealth's argument, declaring that “any rule leaving so much for decision on a case-by-case basis should not be adopted unless none is available which is more certain and yet still fair.”

Accepting the logic that the debt in question was the property of the creditor rather than the debtor, the Court adopted the plan offered by the state of Florida, that power to escheat should reside in the state of the creditor's last known address. “Adoption of such a rule,” Black wrote, “involves a factual issue simple and easy to resolve, and leaves no legal issue to be decided.” “By using a standard of last known address,” the Court concluded, “rather than technical legal concepts of residence and domicile, administration and application of escheat laws should be simplified.”

To address situations in which there is no last address for the creditor, the Court decided that the property was “subject to escheat by the State of corporate domicile, provided that another State could later escheat upon proof that the last known address of the creditor was within its borders.” In instances where the state of the creditor's last known address did not provide for escheat by the state, the Court declared that intangible personal property was “subject to the right of the State of the last known address to recover it if and when its law made provision for escheat of such property,” with the provision that the state could retain “the property for itself only until some other State comes forward with proof that it has a superior right to escheat.”

== Dissent ==
In a dissenting opinion Justice Potter Stewart adhered to the rule established in previous cases that the power to escheat lay with the state of the debtor's incorporation. Noting three previous cases in which this rule had been used, Standard Oil Co. v. New Jersey, 341 U.S. 428; Anderson Nat. Bank v. Luckett, 321 U.S. 233; Security Savings Bank v. California, 263 U.S. 282. Stewart refused to overturn these precedents, noting that “adherence to settled precedent seems to me far better than giving the property to the State within which is located the one place where we know the creditor is not.”
