= Calcutt v. FDIC =

- Supreme Court of the United States

Decided May 22, 2023
- Full case name: Calcutt v. FDIC
- Docket no.: 22-714
- Citations: 598 U.S. 623 (more)

Holding
- An administrative agency's discretionary order may be upheld in court only on the same basis articulated in the order by the agency itself.

Court membership
- Chief Justice John Roberts Associate Justices Clarence Thomas · Samuel Alito; Sonia Sotomayor · Elena Kagan; Neil Gorsuch · Brett Kavanaugh; Amy Coney Barrett · Ketanji Brown Jackson

Case opinion
- Per curiam

Calcutt v. FDIC, 598 U.S. 623 (2023), was a United States Supreme Court case in which the court held that an administrative agency's discretionary order may be upheld in court only on the same basis articulated in the order by the agency itself.

== Background ==
As CEO of Northwestern Bank, Harry C. Calcutt III allegedly mismanaged a loan during the Great Recession. The Federal Deposit Insurance Corporation removed Calcutt from his position, prohibited him from working in the banking sector, and assessed a civil fine. On appeal, the US Court of Appeals for the Sixth Circuit ruled that despite the FDIC's legal errors, the court found substantial evidence of Calcutt's mismanagement.

== Supreme Court ==
Reaffirming its decision in SEC v. Chenery Corp. (1943), the Supreme Court issued a unanimous per curiam decision holding that courts must assess discretionary regulatory decisions using the same standards originally used by that agency. The Supreme Court remanded the case to the FDIC to restart its investigation of Calcutt.

== Narrowing ==
In FDA v. Wages and White Lion Investments, L.L.C. (2025), the Supreme Court narrowed the scope of this decision. While the Calcutt decision reaffirms SEC v. Chenery Corp. (1943), the 1946 Administrative Procedure Act requires courts to use a prejudicial error standard that allows agencies to make minor changes to their regulatory processes consistent with the statutory standard.
