= Force v. Facebook, Inc. =

2019 US appeals court decision

Force v. Facebook
- Court: US Court of Appeals for the Second Circuit
- Decided: 2019
- Docket nos.: No. 18-397

Case history
- Appealed to: Petition for Certiorari before the US Supreme Court, denied
- Related action: Petition for Certiorari denied to Dryoff v. Ultimate Software Group, Inc.
- Argument: Oral argument

Court membership
- Judges sitting: Katzmann, CJ., and Droney and Sullivan, JJ.

Case opinions
- Decision by: Droney, joined by Sullivan
- Concur/dissent: Katzmann

Force v. Facebook, Inc., 934 F.3d 53 (2nd Cir. 2019) was a 2019 decision by the US Second Circuit Appeals Court holding that Section 230 bars civil terrorism claims against social media companies and internet service providers, the first federal appellate court to do so.

The court ruled that the recommender system remains as part of the role of the distributor of the content and not the publisher, since these automated tools were essentially neutral. The US Supreme Court declined in 2020 to hear an appeal of the case.

Judge Robert Katzman gave a 35-page dissenting opinion in the Force case, stating "Mounting evidence suggests that providers designed their algorithms to drive users toward content and people the users agreed with – and that they have done it too well, nudging susceptible souls ever further down dark paths." Katzman's dissent was cited by Judge Clarence Thomas statement in respect of denying certiorari to Malwarebytes, Inc. v. Enigma Software Group USA, LLC.

The Electronic Frontier Foundation filed an amicus curaie brief in the case, arguing for platform immunity.

The court that year also declined to hear Dyroff v. Ultimate Software Group Inc., a related case that cited Force.

== Case History ==
Oral arguments

== See also ==
- Lawsuits involving Meta Platforms
