= Economic policy of the Biden administration =

The economic policy of the Joe Biden administration, colloquially known as Bidenomics (a portmanteau of Biden and economics), was characterized by relief measures and vaccination efforts to address the COVID-19 pandemic, investments in infrastructure, and strengthening the social safety net, funded by tax increases on higher-income individuals and corporations. Other goals include increasing the national minimum wage and expanding worker training, narrowing income inequality, expanding access to affordable healthcare, and forgiveness of student loan debt. The March 2021 enactment of the American Rescue Plan to provide relief from the economic impact of the COVID-19 pandemic was the first major element of the policy. Biden's Infrastructure Investment and Jobs Act was signed into law in November 2021 and contains about $550 billion in additional investment, to repair infrastructure like roads, bridges and water pipes and expand passenger rail and broadband. Biden signed two additional major pieces of longer-term economic legislation to boost semiconductor investments and public basic research, and expand green energy and health insurance subsidies.

The first year of the Biden presidency (2021) saw strong growth in real GDP, wages, employment, stock market returns, and household net worth, coupled with an increase in inflation, as the economy recovered from the pandemic recession of 2020. During 2022–2023, the unemployment rate averaged 3.6%. By April 2024, the unemployment rate had remained below 4.0% for the longest sustained period since 1953. Monthly job creation averaged a robust 402,000 from inauguration through February 2024, or 273,000 from June 2022, when the pre-pandemic jobs level was regained. However, past this point unemployment continued to increase to 4.3% in July 2024. Inflation increased up to 9.0% (measured vs. a year earlier) in June 2022, then began falling. By June 2023 inflation was 3.1% and remained around that level through June 2024. As of November 2024, the inflation rate was 2.7%, with rent price increases contributing roughly half. While inflation was similar to peer countries, the U.S. has outgrown its peers. The Federal Reserve rapidly raised a key interest rate from March 2022 until August 2023, and is expected to lower interest rates in the second half of 2024. The stock market repeatedly broke record highs in 2024.

The New Republic praised Biden's economic record in July 2024, highlighting how record low unemployment led to wage growth at the lower half of the distribution. In October 2024, 35% of households with incomes below $50,000 a year were living paycheck to paycheck, up from 32% in 2019. The expansion of the Affordable Care Act, the child tax credit, $1400 stimulus checks, and the expansion of SNAP benefits also boosted balance sheets for low and middle-income Americans. New business formation rose 30% from pre-pandemic levels, with a disproportionate rise among women, including women of color. Biden appointed Lina Khan as chair of the FTC; her initiatives involved an expansion of antitrust enforcement. The administration also pursued lower drug prices by allowing Medicare to negotiate the prices it pays and capping the price of insulin.

Surveys have also found most Americans view their own economic situation positively and rate their local and state economies as doing better than the national economy, hinting at a disconnect fueled more by media narrative. For example, a March 2024 CBS News poll found that 65% of Americans viewed the economy under Biden's predecessor (and eventual successor), Donald Trump, as good, whereas only 38% expressed a similar positive opinion of the current economy under Biden. However, exit polls of voters in the 2024 presidential election found that 45% of voters stated their personal financial situation was worse than in 2020, which exceeded the 42% number in the 2008 election and was the highest since the question was asked. Only 24% of voters said their personal economic situation was better. This negative perception was credited for Trump's reelection.

== Overview ==
President Biden described his economic philosophy via Twitter in June 2023: "Bidenomics is about growing the economy from the middle out and the bottom up, not the top down. It's an economic vision where we make smart investments in America, educate and empower American workers, and promote competition to lower costs and help small businesses."

=== 2021 ===
President Biden inherited a challenging economic and budgetary situation from President Donald Trump, due significantly to the COVID-19 pandemic. As of December 2020, the jobs level was nearly 10 million (6%) below the early 2020 peak, and the unemployment rate was an elevated 6.7%. There was a record budget deficit in fiscal year 2020 of $3.1 trillion, or 14.9% GDP.

Biden's first major legislative response was the American Rescue Plan Act enacted in March 2021, a $1.9 trillion package that included $1,400 checks per adult, an expanded child tax credit for a year with $250–300 monthly checks per child expected to drastically reduce child poverty, extended unemployment benefits, and expanded eligibility for healthcare benefits, among others. The primary impact was in fiscal year (FY) 2021, with a smaller impact in FY 2022. No Republicans in the House of Representatives or the Senate voted for the Rescue Act.

Biden followed-up with the Infrastructure Investment and Jobs Act, signed into law in November 2021. It authorized infrastructure investment of $1 trillion total over a decade for roads, bridges, airports, sea ports, rail, broadband, water, and public transit, among others. CBO estimated the deficit impact at $250 billion total, as they considered prior infrastructure investment trends as a baseline for comparison. The law passed the Senate in bi-partisan fashion, 69–30.

Real GDP grew 5.9% during Biden's first year, the fastest rate since 1984. Amid record job creation, the unemployment rate fell at the fastest pace on record during Biden's first year, from 6.4% in January 2021 to 3.9% by December 2021. However, inflation significantly increased in 2021 relative to 2020 in the U.S. and Europe, attributed to factors such as strong consumer demand for goods (empowered by government relief programs), supply restrictions in port capacity and microchips, and lower 2020 prices.

Inflation was partially offset by strong wage growth; by one measure, worker wages and benefits increased at the fastest rate in at least 20 years. The administration noted that high inflation was also present in the Eurozone, Canada and the United Kingdom, though economists said the $5 trillion in government stimulus spending in the United States during 2020 and 2021 was disproportionately large compared to that of other countries and was a significant contributor to domestic inflation.

Despite the pandemic and inflation challenges, Bloomberg News reported in November 2021 that the S&P 500 stock market return of 37.4% in Biden's first year (measured from election day) was the highest of any modern president. The stock market gains and significant housing price increases contributed to record household net worth of $142 trillion by Q4 2021.

The budget deficit in fiscal year (FY) 2021, the last year budgeted by President Trump, was $2.8 trillion, down from $3.1 trillion in FY 2020.

=== 2022 ===
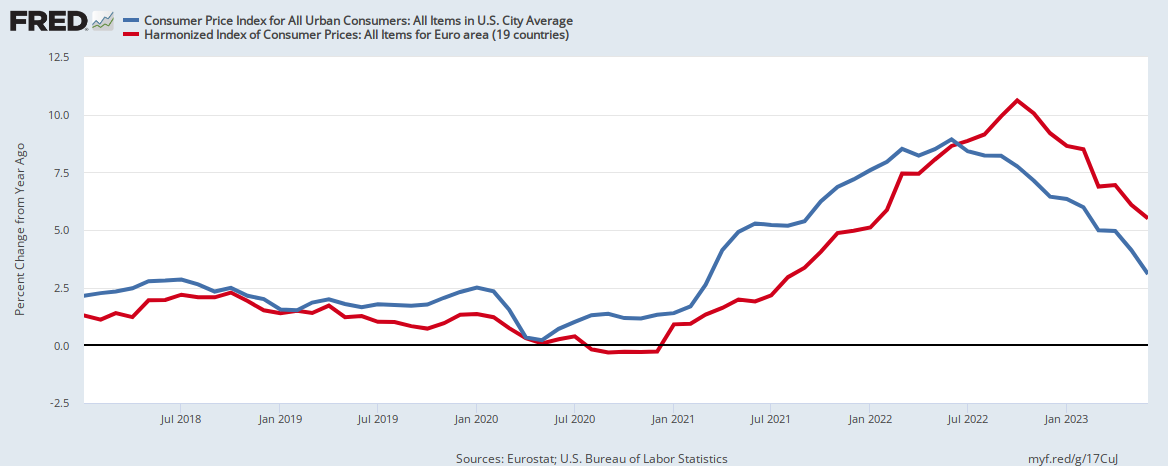
Inflation rate, United States and eurozone, January 2018 through June 2023

A global inflation surge that began in 2021 and peaked in June 2022 before declining through 2023 and into 2024.

The unemployment rate averaged 3.6% in 2022, the lowest since 1969. The number of persons working regained the pre-pandemic peak in June 2022 after revisions, and continued to set records monthly thereafter, reaching 154.5 million by December 2022, with monthly job creation averaging a robust 400,000.

In July 2022, The Wall Street Journal reported that "Household finances are as strong as they've been in decades, thanks to money saved during the pandemic, debt paid off over the past decade and a strong job market." As of Q1 2022, households had also accumulated $5 trillion more in deposit, savings and money market accounts than pre-pandemic. However, some measures of consumer sentiment indicated near record low satisfaction with the economy, mainly due to inflation.

Biden said in May 2022 that "Bringing down the deficit is one way to ease inflationary pressures in an economy." The budget deficit fell by $350 billion in FY 2021. It fell by $1.4 trillion in FY 2022, about 50%, or $1.8 trillion (66%) excluding student loan forgiveness of $425 billion, which CBO had scored as spending but later was blocked by court rulings.

During July 2022, there was much media discussion regarding whether the U.S. had entered a recession, despite a strong labor market with low unemployment and robust job creation. The real (inflation-adjusted) GDP level fell slightly during Q1 and Q2 2022, but then rebounded in Q3 2022 to surpass the previous record level set in Q4 2021. Some countries use two negative quarters as the definition of a recession. However, the National Bureau of Economic Research (NBER) is the organization that declares an economic peak and starting point of recessions in the U.S. They reference six key measures in their analyses. All six measures increased from December 2021 to November 2022, signs of growth rather than recession. Predictions of an imminent recession continued through 2023, but by October indicators showed economic acceleration and analysts revised their economic forecasts upward; a Wall Street Journal survey of economists that month found a recession was not foreseen in the coming twelve months.

During August 2022, Biden signed into law the CHIPS and Science Act and Inflation Reduction Act.

Concerns regarding inflation resulted in the Federal Reserve raising interest rates significantly during 2022, to slow the economy, specifically the "very strong" labor market. Strong household financial positions, rapid wage growth, low unemployment, and a record ratio of open jobs to unemployed were cited by Fed officials as key inflationary concerns. The December 2022 Fed forecast projected an increase in unemployment from 3.7% in November 2022 to 4.6% by the end of 2023, with the Fed driving unemployment higher through raising interest rates and other measures.

The number of persons without health insurance under age 65 fell from 31.2 million in 2020 under President Trump, to 27.0 million during the first half of 2022 under President Biden, a reduction of 3.2 million or 13%. The percentage of uninsured fell from 11.5% to 9.9% during that time. Both the number and % were record lows for data back to 1997.

=== 2023 ===
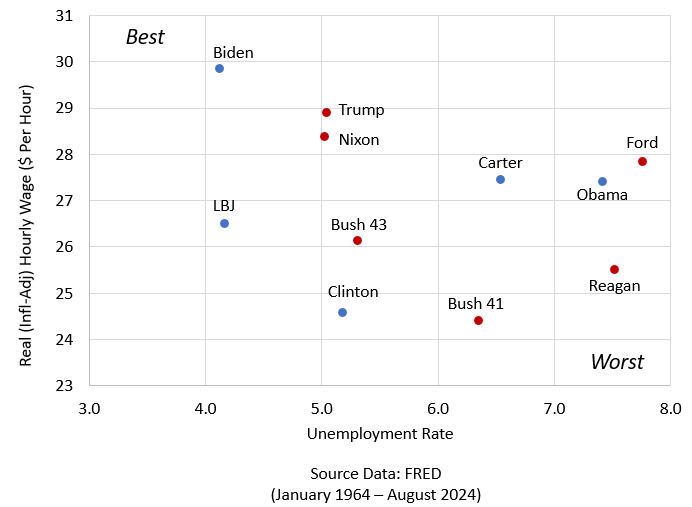
Average unemployment rate and real (inflation-adjusted) hourly wages by U.S. president, LBJ to Biden. As of August 2024, Biden had the best average readings for both measures among these presidents.

Widespread predictions of the economy entering a recession in 2023 proved unfounded. Real gross domestic product grew 2.5% in 2023, significantly outpacing growth in all other G7 nations. Real GDP growth averaged a robust 3.4% during the first three years of the Biden presidency.

The labor market was strong in 2023. The unemployment rate averaged a very low 3.6% in 2023, as it had in 2022; the last year with an average 3.5% unemployment rate was 1969. The number of persons with jobs continued setting records monthly as it had since June 2022 when the pre-pandemic peak was regained, reaching 157.3 million in December 2023. An average of 251,000 jobs per month were added in 2023, a total of 3.0 million.

Wage gains exceeded inflation in 2023, with real (inflation-adjusted) hourly earnings for all employees increasing 0.8% from December 2022 to December 2023. The inflation rate measured vs. one year earlier was 6.4% in January 2023 and 3.1% in December as the inflation rate slowed. Census data released in January 2024 showed that record-high new business applications were filed in 2023, the third consecutive annual record high.

CBO reported the budget deficit increased from $1,376 billion (5.4% GDP) in fiscal year (FY) 2022 to $1,695 billion (6.3% GDP) in FY 2023, an increase of $319 billion or 23%.

During May, Republicans threatened to not raise the U.S. debt ceiling, risking a possible debt default. President Biden signed the Fiscal Responsibility Act of 2023 on June 3, 2023, to avert a potential crisis. The law restricts some spending for two years, imposes new work requirements on older Americans receiving food aid, and reduces barriers to some infrastructure and energy projects.

With Republicans in control of the House of Representatives, no significant economic legislation was passed. Only 27 bills were signed into law during 2023, the least since the Great Depression.

In 2023, the administration also pursued lower drug prices by allowing Medicare to negotiate the prices it pays and capping the price of insulin.

=== 2024 ===
In 2024, the number of persons with jobs continued setting records monthly, reaching 159.3 million in November, about 7.0 million jobs above the pre-pandemic peak, which had been regained in June 2022. The unemployment rate increased from 3.7% in January to 4.2% in November. The stock market (S&P 500 Index) increased 29% from December 2023 to November 2024, using monthly average levels. Real (inflation-adjusted) hourly wages increased from $30.29 in January to $30.57 in November, among the highest readings for data back to 1964, indicating robust purchasing power despite inflation in 2021–2022.

For data through November 2024, President Biden on average had the lowest unemployment rate (4.12%) and highest real hourly wages for production & non-supervisory workers ($30.11) among presidents back to 1964.

In 2024, Biden pushed to limit junk fees through the FTC, FCC and CFPB. Biden has taken antitrust more seriously than presidents in recent memory, as seen by the work of Lina Khan at the FTC, a historic court victory against Google's search monopoly, and a lawsuit to break-up Live Nation and Ticketmaster.

In February 2024, the total federal government debt grew to $34.4 trillion after having grown by approximately $1 trillion in both of two separate 100-day periods since the previous June. However, the ratio of debt held by the public to GDP fell from 97.1% in Q1 2021 when Biden started to 95.2% in Q2 2024, as growth outpaced debt increases.

In August 2024, the DOJ filed an anti-trust lawsuit against RealPage alleging that it was allowing landlords across the United States to engage in price fixing.

CBO reported in July 2024 that Biden's immigration surge was forecast to add nearly 9 million immigrants to the economy between 2021 and 2026, above the pre-2020 trend. CBO estimated this would add about $9 trillion to GDP or national income ($65,000 per household) over the 2024-2034 period, with wages 3% cumulatively higher by 2034 than without the surge. The budget deficits would be reduced by nearly $1 trillion, with $1.2 trillion more revenue partially offset by $0.3 trillion more spending.

The Census Bureau reported that real (inflation-adjusted) median household income was $83,730 in 2024, the highest on record. The 2024 poverty rate of 10.6% was the second lowest on record and one of only two years with a poverty rate below 11.0%. The uninsured rate of 8.0% was tied for 2nd lowest on record.

== Key legislation ==
=== American Rescue Plan Act ===
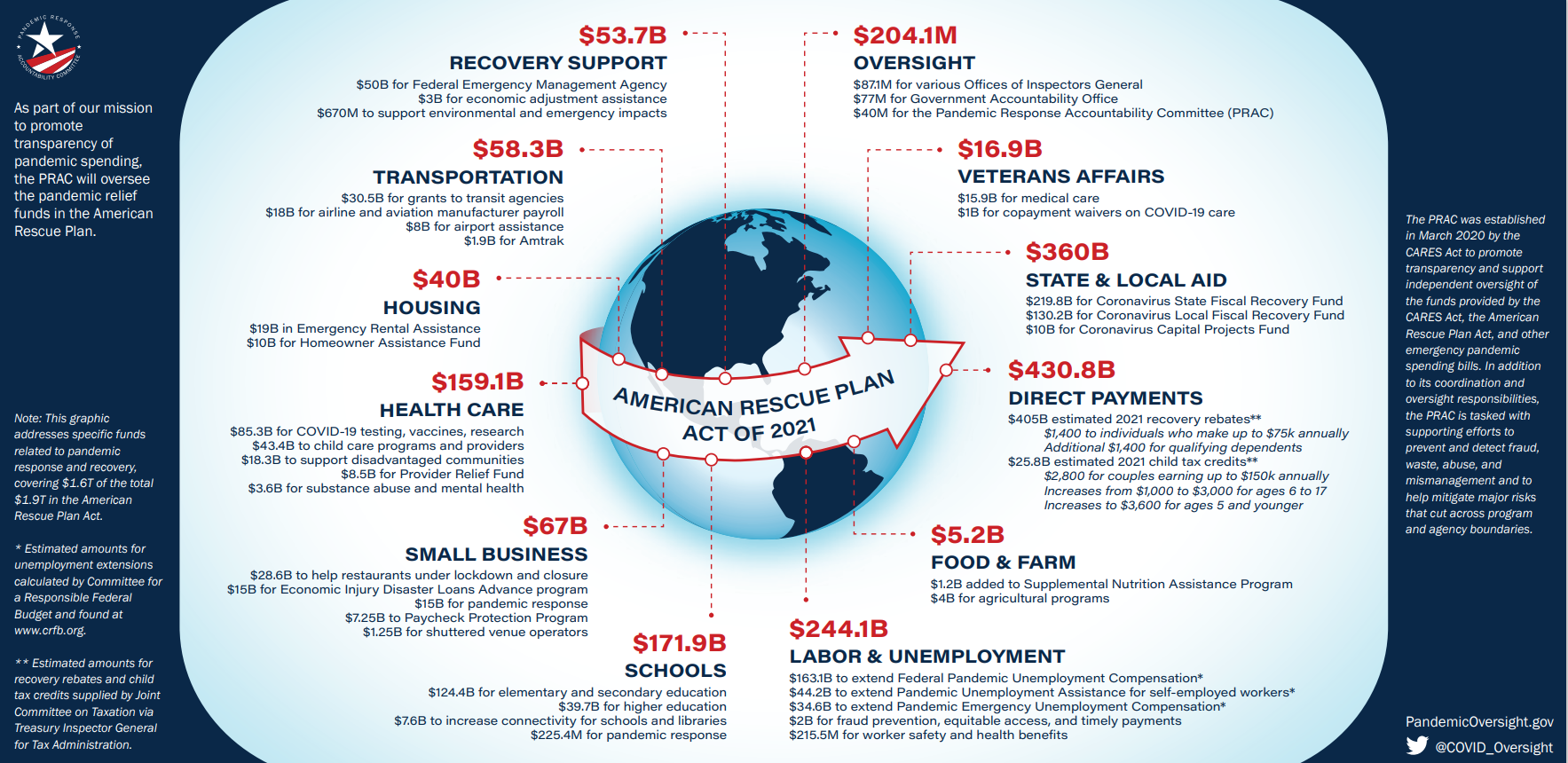
American Rescue Plan Act of 2021 – Infographic

Biden's $1.9 trillion relief package, the American Rescue Plan Act, was signed into law in March 2021. Many observers identified it to be the largest social welfare initiative undertaken by the federal government in decades, and economists predict low income households will benefit the most from the plan. Analysts also predict that the adult poverty rate could be cut by a quarter, and the child poverty rate cut by half as a result of its passage.

The key elements of the Rescue Act include:

- $1,400 direct payments to individuals earning up to $75,000 a year;
- Extending expanded unemployment benefits through the end of September 2021;
- Increased the value and expanded eligibility for the child tax credit; to $3,600 per child under age 6 and $3,000 per child ages 6–17, up from $2,000. An estimated 39 million families with children will receive the additional benefits. Payments are scheduled monthly for July to December 2021, with the remaining six months of benefits due when the tax return is filed for 2021. The credit was changed from non-refundable to refundable, meaning those with low income who previously didn't have sufficient tax liability to receive the credit, will now receive the payment. This is a one-year program, that the administration hopes to make permanent.
- $130 billion to primary and secondary schools;
- $45 billion in rental, mortgage, and utility assistance;
- Billions for small businesses;
- $14 billion for a national vaccine program, including preparation of community vaccination centers;
- $350 billion to help state, local, and tribal governments bridge budget shortfalls.

The Tax Policy Center reported that the law would cut taxes by an average of $3,000 per household and raise after-tax incomes by an average of 3.8% in 2021, with 70% of the benefit going to lower- and middle-income households. This is in sharp contrast to the Tax Cuts and Jobs Act, in which half of the benefits went to the top 5% highest income households.

=== Infrastructure Investment and Jobs Act ===
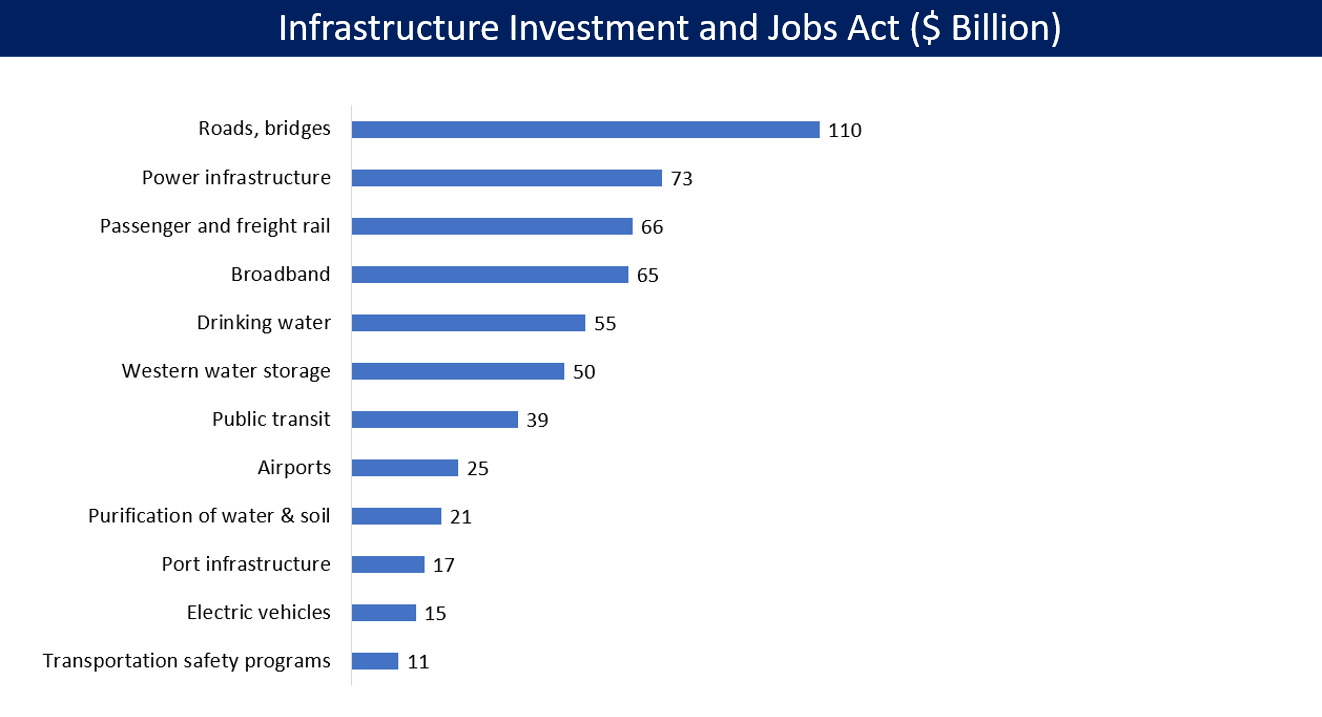
Investment categories ($ billion) in the Infrastructure Investment and Jobs Act of 2021, adding to about $550 billion

The Infrastructure Investment and Jobs Act is a key pillar in Biden's American Jobs Plan. It passed the House and Senate and was signed into law on November 15, 2021. While referred to as the $1 trillion infrastructure plan, it includes $550 billion in additional spending beyond previous legislation and was scored by the CBO to add about $250 billion to the deficit over a decade. It includes investments for: Roads and bridges ($110B), power infrastructure ($73B), passenger and freight rail ($66B), broadband ($65B), clean drinking water ($55B), western water storage ($50B), public transit ($39B), Airports ($25B), water & soil purification ($21B), ports ($17B), electric vehicles ($15B) and transportation safety programs ($11B). As of September 2024, over 60,000 projects funded by the law were underway across the U.S.

=== CHIPS and Science Act ===
The CHIPS and Science Act passed the House and Senate with bi-partisan support during July 2022 and was signed into law by Biden on August 9, 2022. Biden said: “America invented the semiconductor. It’s time to bring it home.” The New York Times reported that it is valued at $280 billion and is designed to help strengthen America's manufacturing and technology capabilities, including "$200 billion for scientific research, especially into artificial intelligence, robotics, quantum computing, and a variety of other technologies."

CNBC reported that it includes $52 billion for U.S. companies producing computer chips, plus additional tax credits to encourage chip manufacturing in the U.S. This was in response to a pandemic-related chip shortage, disrupting auto production and driving up car prices and inflation. Further, most chips are manufactured in Taiwan, which increases the risk of disruption should China intervene there.

The White House issued a press release stating: "The CHIPS and Science Act is exactly what we need to be doing to grow our economy right now. By making more semiconductors in the United States, this bill will increase domestic manufacturing and lower costs for families. And, it will strengthen our national security by making us less dependent on foreign sources of semiconductors. This bill includes important guardrails to ensure that companies receiving tax payer dollars invest in America and that union workers are building new manufacturing plants across the country."

=== Inflation Reduction Act ===
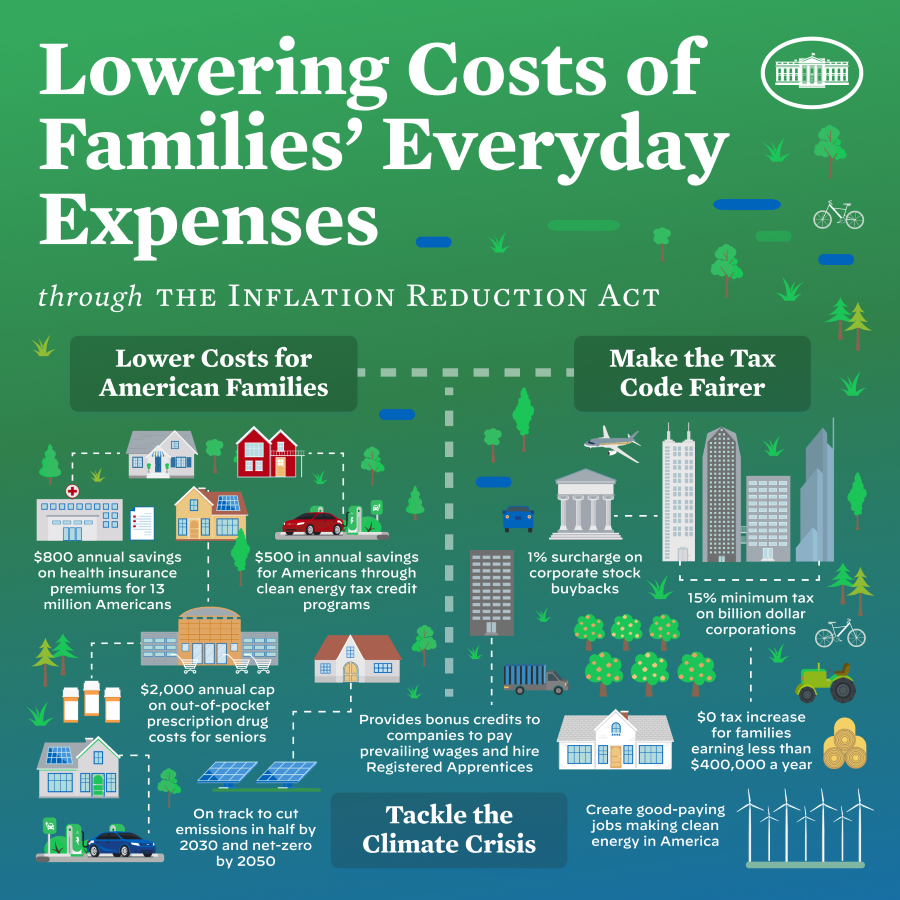
Inflation Reduction Act (IRA) Summary

The Inflation Reduction Act passed the House and Senate using reconciliation along party lines in August 2022. President Biden signed it into law on August 16. Vox reported that key objectives include:

- Reduce carbon emissions significantly through climate protection incentives. This includes tax credits and rebates for renewable technologies (e.g., solar, wind and electric vehicles). It uses incentives rather than penalties primarily.
- Improve health insurance coverage and affordability, by extending ACA subsidy enhancements scheduled to expire in 2022 by three years through 2025. These helped an estimate 7 million people get free health insurance.
- Lower healthcare costs by allowing Medicare to negotiate drug prices for key drugs and cap insulin costs for Medicare patients at $35 per month. This does not apply to private insurance.
- Enhance tax enforcement, by investing $80B in the IRS over a decade on systems and personnel. CBO estimates an additional $200B in collections over a decade.
- Increase corporate taxes, by implementing a 15% minimum tax applied to accounting income and a 1% tax on stock buybacks. The Act does not directly increase taxes on individuals.

The CBO estimated the Act would reduce the budget deficit by about $100 billion over a decade, or $300 billion if enhanced IRS collections are included. CBO also reported that the Act would have little impact on inflation, as shifting money from corporations to healthcare subsidies would boost the economy approximately as much as the deficit decrease would slow it.

The Tax Policy Center estimated that the bottom 80% tax filers by income would receive a net benefit, if ACA premium tax credits (subsidies) are included. The 80th–99th percentile would incur a small cost (0-0.1% increase in average federal tax rate) while the top 1% would incur a 0.2% increase. The costs mainly are imposed indirectly as corporations facing higher taxes may reduce the wage increases or levels for workers; individual tax rates were not changed.

== Statistical summary ==
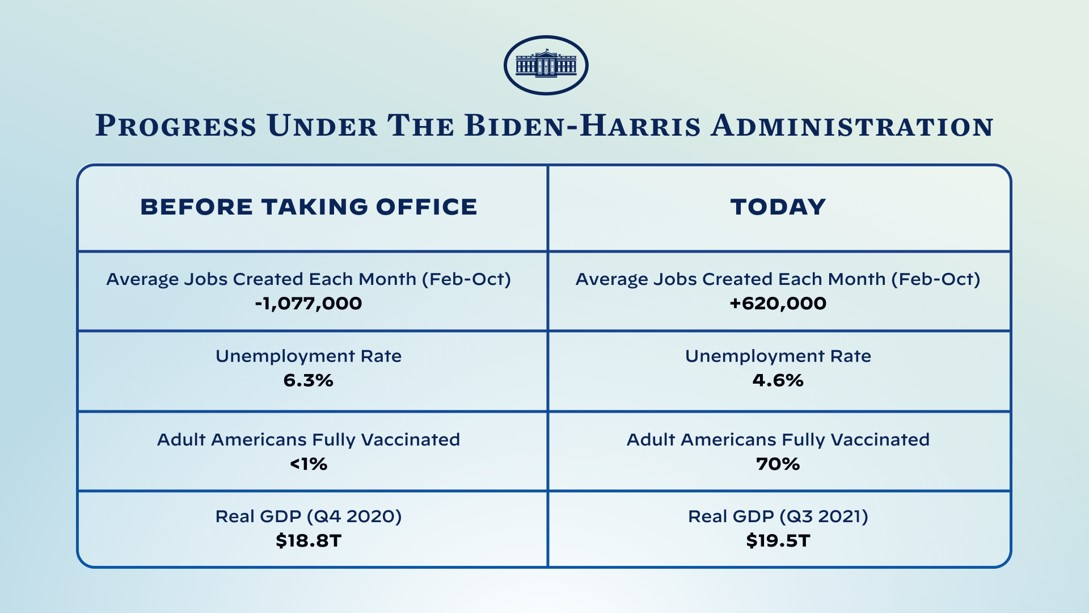
Summary of economic statistics comparing start of Biden administration vs. October 2021

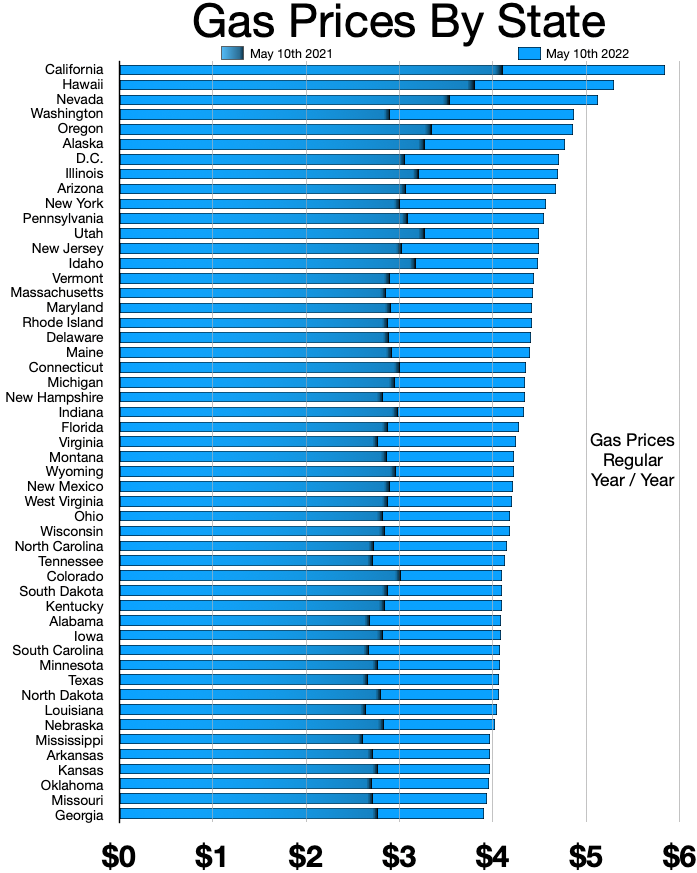
Gas prices by state — difference from 1 year prior — May 10, 2021, to May 10, 2022

The following tables include comparisons for a variety of measures. The term "real" means inflation-adjusted, to improve comparability.

=== First year: January 2021 to January 2022 ===
Variable	January 2021	January 2022	Change	% Change
Jobs, level (millions)	143.0	149.6	+6.6	+4.6%
Unemployment rate %	6.4%	4.0%	−2.4%	−37.5%
Number unemployed (millions)	10.1	6.5	−3.6	−36%
Real GDP level ($ trillions)	19.06 Q1 '21	19.81 Q4 '21	+0.75	+3.9%
Inflation (CPI-All Index)	262.20	281.93	+19.73	+7.5%
Wages ($/Hour Production & Non-Supv.)	$25.18	$26.92	+1.74	+6.9%
Budget deficit ($ billions)	2,772 FY '21	1,153 FY '22 F	−1,619	−58%
Stock market (S&P 500 monthly index average)	3,794	4,573	+ 664	+21%
Debt held by public ($ trillions)	21.6	23.6	+1.9	+8.8%

=== January 2021 to January 2025 ===
This analysis compares the start of the Biden administration to the end. Monthly starting measures are for January 2021, while quarterly measures are for Q1 2021. Ending measures are January 2025 or Q4 2019. The 2021 starting point was impacted by the pandemic, with employment statistics such as the jobs level and unemployment rate worse than pre-pandemic 2019, while real wages had been artificially increased by millions of lower-wage workers losing their jobs, driving up the average.

Variable	January 2021	January 2025	Change	% Change
Jobs, level (millions)	143.0	159.1	+16.1	+11.3%
Unemployment rate %	6.4%	4.0%	−2.4pp	n/a
Employment to population ratio, age 25–54	76.4%	80.7%	+4.3pp	n/a
Real wages ($/Hour Production & Non-Supv; June 2025$)	$30.81	$31.03	+0.22	0.7%
Real GDP per capita (Chained 2017 Dollars)	$63,418	$69,006	+5,588	+8.8%
Stock market (S&P 500 Index monthly avg.)	3,794	5,980	+2,186	+57.6%
Real net worth per household, bottom 50% group (2025 Q1$)	$55,795	$60,628	+$4,833	+8.7%
Real net worth per household, 50th to 90th percentile group (2025 Q1$)	$873,218	$922,631	+$49,413	+5.7%
Debt held by public % GDP	97.3%	97.1%	-0.2%	n/a
Crude oil production, level (000's of Barrels/Day)	11,137	13,248 (Apr '24)	+2,111	+19.0%

=== Pre-pandemic peak to January 2025 ===
Analyzing from pre-pandemic helps avoid the economic distortions of the pandemic in 2020–2021, which made the traditional starting point for evaluation (the month of inauguration) analytically misleading. The pre-pandemic peak for quarterly measures was Q4 2019, and the monthly peak was February 2020 for most measures. The jobs level regained the pre-pandemic peak in June 2022.

Variable	Pre-Pandemic (Q4 '19 or Feb '20)	Jan 2025 or Q4 '24	Change	% Change
Jobs, level (millions)	152.3	159.1	+6.8	+4.5%
Unemployment rate %	3.5%	4.0%	+0.5pp	n/a
Employment to population ratio, age 25–54	80.4%	80.7%	+0.3pp	n/a
Real wages ($/Hour Production & Non-Supv; June 2025$)	$29.80	$31.03	+1.23	+4.1%
Real GDP per capita ($)	$63,360	$69,006	+5,646	+8.9%
Stock market (S&P 500 Index monthly avg.)	3,277	5,980	+2,703	+82.5%
Real net worth per household, bottom 50% group (2025 Q1$)	$37,873	$60,628	+$22,755	+60.1%
Real net worth per household, 50th to 90th percentile group (2025 Q1$)	$752,273	$922,631	+$170,358	+22.6%
Debt held by public % GDP	78.5%	97.1%	+23.7pp	n/a
Crude oil production, level (000's of Barrels/Day)	12,844	13,248 (Apr '24)	+404	+3.1%

== Plans and legislative strategies ==
=== American Jobs Plan ===
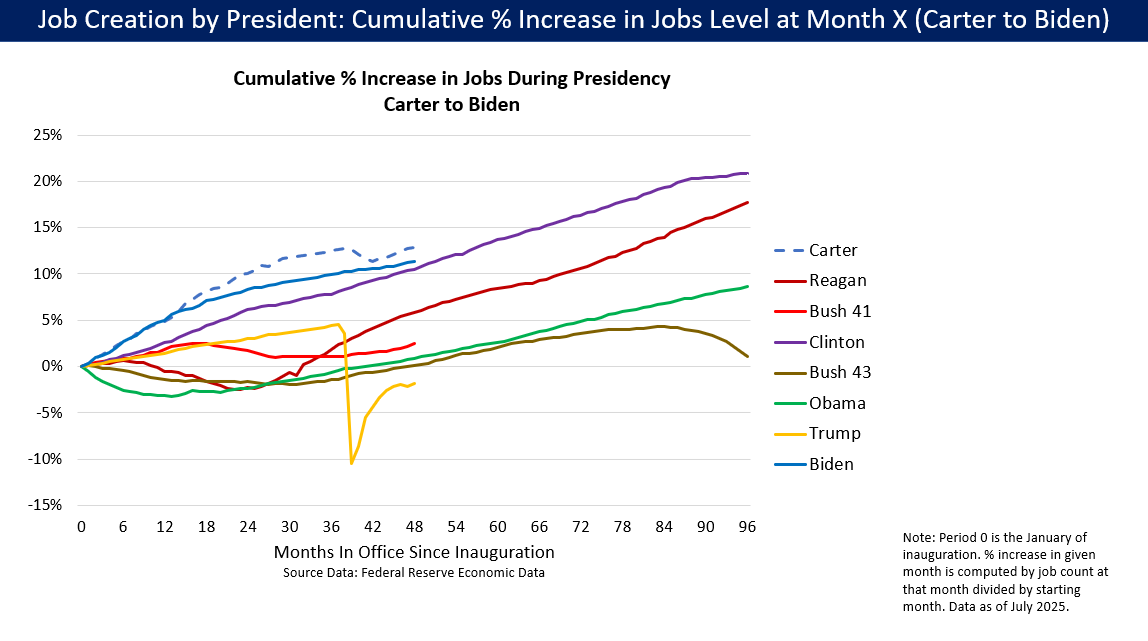
Job growth by U.S. president, measured as cumulative percentage change from month of inauguration (period 0) to end of term. Measured through the end of his term, President Biden had the second fastest cumulative job creation at month 48 of any president from Carter to present, at +11.3%, behind Carter at +12.8%.

In March 2021, Biden proposed a $2.65 trillion infrastructure package known as the American Jobs Plan with investments over 10 years, fully paid for by corporate tax increases over 15 years. A White House fact sheet described the plan: "This is the moment to reimagine and rebuild a new economy. The American Jobs Plan is an investment in America that will create millions of good jobs, rebuild our country's infrastructure, and position the United States to out-compete China." The fact sheet further described the U.S. as ranking 13th in the world in infrastructure, with a vulnerable electrical grid. It expands the concept of infrastructure from physical assets like roads and bridges, to human infrastructure investments like caregiving and training.

The Committee for a Responsible Federal Budget (CRFB) summarized the investments as follows ($ in billions):

- Climate $782
- Transportation $447
- Health & Childcare $443
- Housing & Buildings $258
- Jobs & economic development $196
- Research & Development $159
- Manufacturing $154
- Clean water $111
- Broadband $100

CRFB also summarized the revenue elements over 15 years:

- Increase corporate tax rate from 21% to 28%, generating $1,300 billion in revenue. The rate had been lowered from 35% in 2017 to 21% in 2018 by the Tax Cuts and Jobs Act.
- Implement a global minimum tax, raising $750 billion.
- Several other elements to address corporate tax loopholes and shelters, raising $680 billion.

=== American Families Plan ===
In April 2021, Biden proposed "The American Families Plan", which a White House fact sheet described as: "[A]n investment in our children and our families – helping families cover the basic expenses that so many struggle with now, lowering health insurance premiums, and continuing the American Rescue Plan's historic reductions in child poverty." The plan elements include:

- Adding at least four years of free education, including two years of pre-school for 3–4 year-olds, and two years of community college. The Biden administration estimates the pre-school program will benefit 5 million children each year and save the average family $13,000. The community college program will help about 5.5 million students per year pay $0 in fees, about $109 billion over a decade.
- Providing child care subsidies to limit spending of low- and middle-income families to 7% of income.
- Creating national paid family and medical leave program, comparable to other developed nations.
- Expanding food assistance, including in schools to reduce child hunger.
- Extending tax cuts in the American Rescue plan indefinitely, including the Child Tax Credit, Earned Income Tax Credit, and the Dependent Care Tax Credit.
- Expanding healthcare subsidies in the American Rescue plan indefinitely, including $50/month subsidies (on average) received by nine million people.

The New York Times estimated the American Families Plan would invest about $1.8 trillion over 10 years, with about $800 billion in tax credits, $545 billion in child and family support, $511 billion for education, and $80 billion to expand the ability of the Internal Revenue Service to collect taxes from the wealthy.

=== Build Back Better Act ===
The Build Back Better Act, a reconciliation package including about $2.2 trillion in spending/investments and $2.0 trillion in additional revenue over a decade, passed the House of Representatives November 19, 2021, and is pending before the Senate. Most of the bill's provisions have finite duration.

The New York Times reported that enacting the bill would fund benefits such as:

- Child care program for children up to five years of age, capping family expenses at 7% of income ($273 billion).
- Paid family and medical leave of four weeks ($205 billion).
- Child tax credit extension through 2023 ($185 billion).
- Universal preschool for 3- and 4-year-olds ($109 billion).
- Healthcare programs, such as funds for home health care under Medicaid ($150 billion), and expansion to ACA eligibility and subsidies ($74 billion).
- Climate programs with various tax incentives, pollution controls, and financial assistance ($495 billion).
- Housing programs such as public housing, rental assistance, and affordable housing ($166 billion).

The revenue or cost reduction sources include:

- Corporate tax increases of $814 billion, including new methods such as an alternative minimum tax on accounting profits and taxing stock buybacks.
- Individual tax increases of $655 billion, focused on high-income households, including surtaxes for incomes over $10 million or $25 million.
- Allowing government to negotiate prices for Medicare prescriptions (cost reduction of $76 billion).
- Limiting prescription drug price increases (cost reduction of $84 billion).

The CBO estimated the bill would add $350 billion total to the national debt over the 2022–2031 period, excluding about $200 billion in estimated collections from stronger IRS enforcement (bringing the net impact closer to $150 billion), overall a relatively minor net impact on the national debt.

== Biden's first budget FY 2022 ==
President Biden published his first budget for fiscal year 2022, covering the FY 2022–2031 decade. The Committee for a Responsible Federal Budget (CRFB) summarized it as follows: "The President's budget proposes about $5 trillion of new spending and tax breaks, reflecting the previously proposed American Jobs Plan, American Families Plan, and nondefense discretionary spending increases. These provisions would be partially offset with nearly $3.6 trillion of new revenue and over $200 billion of budget cuts and savings. The budget would also add $163 billion of interest costs.” CRFB estimated this as a net $1.354 trillion increase in the budget deficit over a decade, or $135 billion/year. This budget is incremental to the $2.0 trillion impact of the American Rescue Plan, which was enacted in March 2021 and already included in the baseline forecast used for the CRFB computations. For scale, Trump's Tax Cuts and Jobs Act represented about $2 trillion in deficit additions over a decade, or $200 billion/year.

CRFB also commented on the economic assumptions in the budget as being comparable to other major forecasts: "The budget's growth assumptions of 2.2 percent per year over the decade and 1.9 percent per year in the second half of the decade are somewhat higher than CBO's projections of 2.0 and 1.6 percent and the Federal Reserve's 2.0 and 1.8 percent estimates. However, they are in line with the Blue Chip consensus, which is also 2.2 percent per year over the next decade and 1.9 percent per year in the longer term." CRFB commented that Biden's budget is somewhat more optimistic on unemployment rates than these other forecasters.

== COVID-19 ==
=== January 2021 ===
In January 2022, President Biden said there was no federal solution to the pandemic as cases were climbing dramatically, and that the situation should be handled at the state level. He then issued an executive order intended to deliver economic relief to families and businesses. This included:

- Increasing access to food for students missing meals due to school closures and enhancing SNAP (food stamps) benefits;
- Improving delivery of direct stimulus payments;
- Request Department of Labor to clarify that workers could still access unemployment insurance if employment would have jeopardized their health due to COVID-19;
- Develop support network to help families and businesses access government benefits; and
- Require federal contractors to pay $15 minimum wage.

== Minimum wage ==
Biden's COVID-19 stimulus package, the American Rescue Plan, originally included raising the minimum wage to $15 per hour, but this was later removed after moderate Senate Democrats and Republicans objected to the proposal. A CBO study in 2019 estimated that raising the minimum wage to $15 by 2025 would increase wages for 17 million directly in that year, although the number of persons with jobs could be reduced in a range of zero to 3.7 million.

Three months into office, Biden signed an executive order to increase the minimum wage for federal contractors by nearly 37%, to $15 per hour. The order went into effect for 390,000 workers in January 2022.

== Trade ==
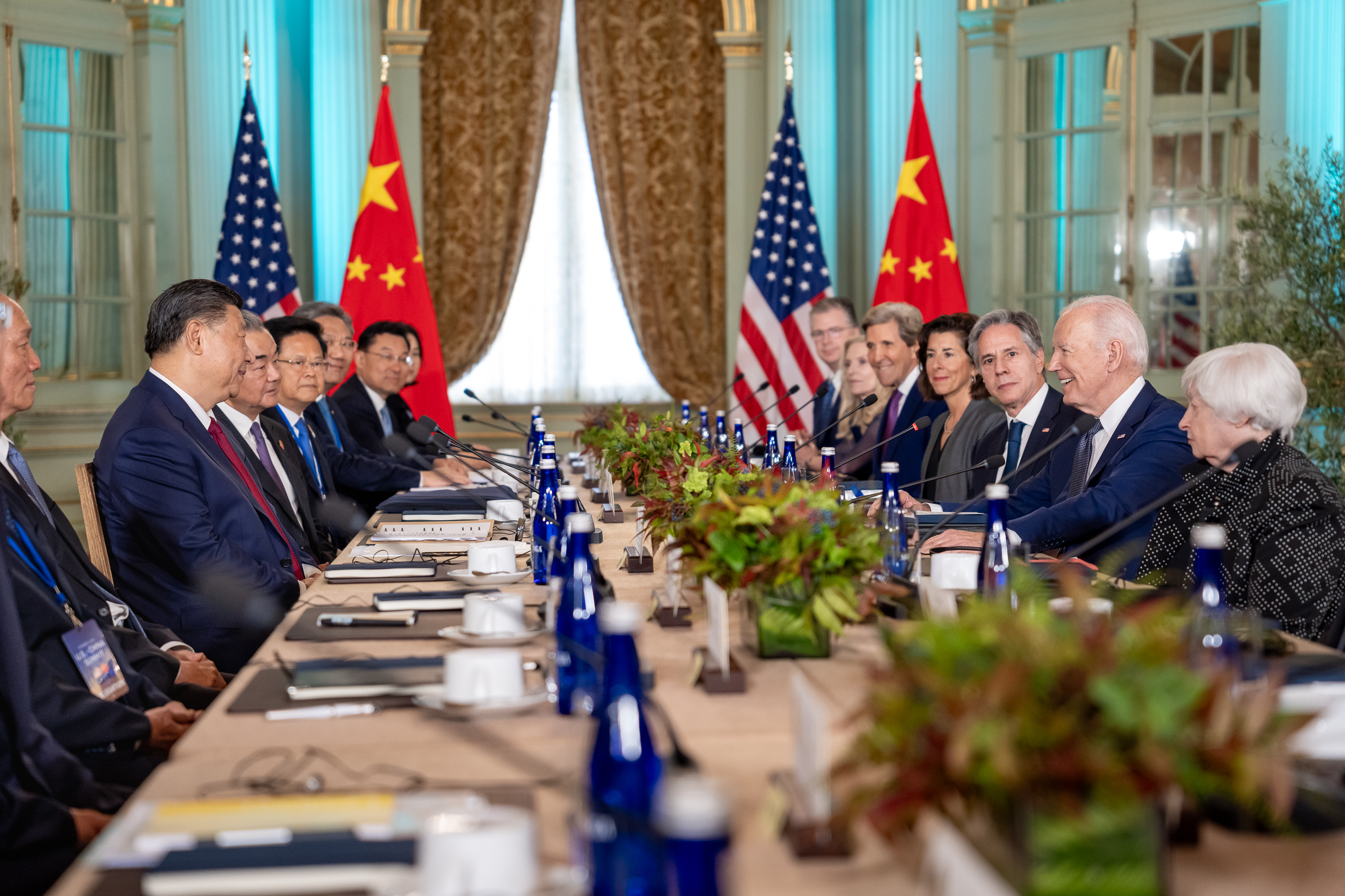
Talks between U.S. delegation headed by Biden and Chinese delegation headed by Xi at the Filoli Estate in Woodside, California, November 2023

The Wall Street Journal reported that instead of negotiating access to Chinese markets for large American financial-service firms and pharmaceutical companies, the Biden administration focused on trade policies that boost exports or domestic jobs. U.S. Trade Representative Katherine Tai said the administration wants a "worker-centered trade policy". U.S. Secretary of Commerce Gina Raimondo said she planned to aggressively enforce trade rules to combat unfair practices by China.

In March 2021, Katherine Tai said that the U.S. would not lift tariffs on Chinese imports in the near future, despite lobbying efforts from "free traders," including former Secretary of Treasury Hank Paulson and the Business Roundtable, that pressed for tariff repeal.

At the October 2021 G20 Rome summit, the Biden administration and the European Union reached agreement to roll back the steel and aluminum tariff regime that had been imposed by the Trump administration in 2018. The agreement retained some protection for American steel and aluminum producers by adopting a tariff-rate quota regime. It also ended retaliatory tariffs on American goods the EU had imposed and canceled a scheduled tariff increase by the EU.

China failed by a wide margin to purchase American goods and services as agreed under the January 2020 Phase One trade deal, which expired on December 31, 2021. The Biden administration continued to formulate its China trade policy and faced a decision as to whether to reinstate some tariffs and risk retaliation, or to ignore China's breach amid elevated inflation that might be exacerbated by additional tariffs.

As of December 2023, Biden has largely maintained Trump's protectionist trade policies, and has not negotiated any new free trade agreements. Labor unions, an important constituency for Biden's re-election, opposed removing Trump's tariffs. In May 2024, the Biden administration doubled tariffs on solar cells imported from China and more than tripled tariffs on lithium-ion electric vehicle batteries imported from China. It also raised tariffs on imports of Chinese steel, aluminum, and medical equipment. The tariff increases will be phased in over a period of three years.

== Clean energy ==
Despite Biden's promotion of clean energy, and Republican assertions he was waging "war on American energy," by the end of his third year the United States was producing more crude oil than any country in history.

== Education ==
Biden has proposed paying for college tuition and pre-K for middle-class families. He also attempted to forgive some student loans, with mixed success.

=== Student loan forgiveness ===
Biden supported canceling student loan debt up to $10,000 during 2020, for some borrowers. Other prominent Democrats (Senators Warren and Schumer) co-authored a resolution including cancelations up to $50,000 for all borrowers. There is an active debate about whether legislation or executive order is sufficient to cancel student loans. Critics argued that canceling student loans is regressive rather than progressive, as most with student loans are college educated and earn more. Further, the impact on college tuition pricing and access is unclear.

The Federal Reserve Bank of New York reported that student loans totaled $1.5 trillion in 2019, with 43 million borrowers. The average balance was $33,500. About 14 million borrowers (33%) had balances below $10,000; 20 million (47%) had balances $10,000–50,000, and 9 million (20%) had balances over $50,000.

The Committee for a Responsible Federal Budget reported in November 2020 that canceling student loans had several pros and cons, but was a relatively ineffective economic stimulus. While household net worth would rise by $1.5 trillion if all loans were canceled, in terms of monthly spending the typical household with student loan debt would be avoiding a $200–300 monthly payment. Re-directing this savings to other spending would have limited economic impact of about $100 billion/year. One important consideration is the tax treatment of the forgiven debt; if treated as a gain (income), it would likely be taxable in the absence of legislation negating the gain, offsetting the small positive economic impact.

CNBC reported that forgiving $10,000 in student debt for all borrowers would cost the government $377 billion, but forgiving $10,000 just for those with debt below $10,000 (about a third of borrowers) would cost $75 billion. Debtors in the latter category tend to be those struggling to pay off their debt.

By the end of Biden's first year in office, the Department of Education had forgiven $15 billion in debt for 675,000 borrowers.

In August 2022, Biden announced a U.S. Department of Education program to cancel certain federally owned student loan debt under the HEROES Act. Borrowers earning under $125,000 per year, or under $250,000 for married couples who file jointly, would have been eligible for up to $10,000 in loan forgiveness. Borrowers who received a Pell Grant while attending college would have qualified for up to an additional $10,000 in loan forgiveness, for a total of $20,000. The administration estimated that about 43 million borrowers would have been covered by the plan, including about 20 million individuals whose student debt would be completely forgiven. Estimates had stated that the plan would cost as much as $519 billion for the "debt cancellation alone", and critics characterized Biden's plans to cancel hundreds of billions of dollars in debt as a "disaster".

After 6 state governments filed lawsuits challenging the program, the Supreme Court held in Biden v. Nebraska (2023) that the program exceeded the authority delegated to the Department of Education under the HEROES Act. In April 2024, Biden announced a revised student loan forgiveness program citing statutory authority under the Higher Education Act of 1965.

Under the American Rescue Plan Act of 2021, student loan forgiveness was designated as tax-exempt income through the end of 2025, and Biden proposed making the tax exemption permanent in March 2024. In June 2022, the Department of Education agreed to forgive the student loans of approximately 200,000 borrowers (amounting to approximately $6 billion) to settle a class-action lawsuit the students filed against the Department in June 2019 for refusing to process their waivers under Borrower Defense to Repayment from debt owed to for-profit institutions that misled the students about the financial remuneration, the quality of vocational training, and the career advancement they would receive by attending the institutions. In August 2022, the Department of Education announced that it would cancel the student loans of 208,000 borrowers who attended ITT Technical Institute (amounting to $3.9 billion). In October 2022, the department released final regulations to expand and streamline targeted debt relief programs for students that were defrauded by the institutions they attended, as well as changes to the Public Service Loan Forgiveness (PSLF) program which led to 360,000 borrowers qualifying for $24 billion in debt relief.

In July 2023, the Biden administration announced that it would forgive $39 billion in student loan debt for 804,000 borrowers on income-driven repayment plans that had been repaying student loans for 20 to 25 years. In August 2023, the Biden administration announced that it would forgive $72 million in student loan debt for 2,300 borrowers that attended Ashford University who were defrauded by the institution, then an $37 million in student loan debt to 1,200 borrowers that attended the University of Phoenix who were misled by false advertising by the institution related to post-graduation employment. In October 2023, the Department of Education announced that it would withhold $7.2 million in payment to the Missouri Higher Education Loan Authority (MOHELA) for failing to send billing statements on a timely basis to 2.5 million borrowers that caused 800,000 borrowers to fall into delinquency and the Department directed MOHELA to place all affected borrowers into forbearance, while Biden announced $9 billion in student loan debt forgiveness to 125,000 borrowers due to further fixes to income-based repayments system of the PSLF program. In December 2023, the Biden administration announced another $4.8 billion in student loan debt forgiveness for 80,000 borrowers due to further fixes to income-based repayments system of the PSLF program.

In January 2024, the Department of Education also announced that it would forgive $4.9 billion in student loan debt for 73,600 borrowers due to further fixes to the income-based repayments system of the PSLF program. In February 2024, the Biden administration announced that it would forgive $1.2 billion in student loan debt for 150,000 borrowers through its Saving on a Valuable Education loan repayment program. In March 2024, the Biden administration announced that it would forgive $5.8 billion in student loan debt to 78,000 borrowers under the PSLF program, and then an additional $7.4 billion in student loan debt for 277,000 borrowers from additional changes to the PSLF program the next month, which brought the total dollar amount of student loan debt forgiven by the administration to $153 billion and the total number of borrowers with debt forgiven to 4.3 million. In May 2024, the Biden administration announced that it would forgive $6.1 billion in student loan debt for 317,000 borrowers who attended The Art Institutes, a defunct for-profit university system of art schools, due to "pervasive and substantial" misrepresentations to prospective students about post-graduation employment rates, salaries, and career services. In the same month, the Department of Education announced that it would transfer potentially more than 1 million borrowers from MOHELA to different loan servicers, and extended a student loan consolidation application deadline that had expired on April 30 to June 30.

== Healthcare ==
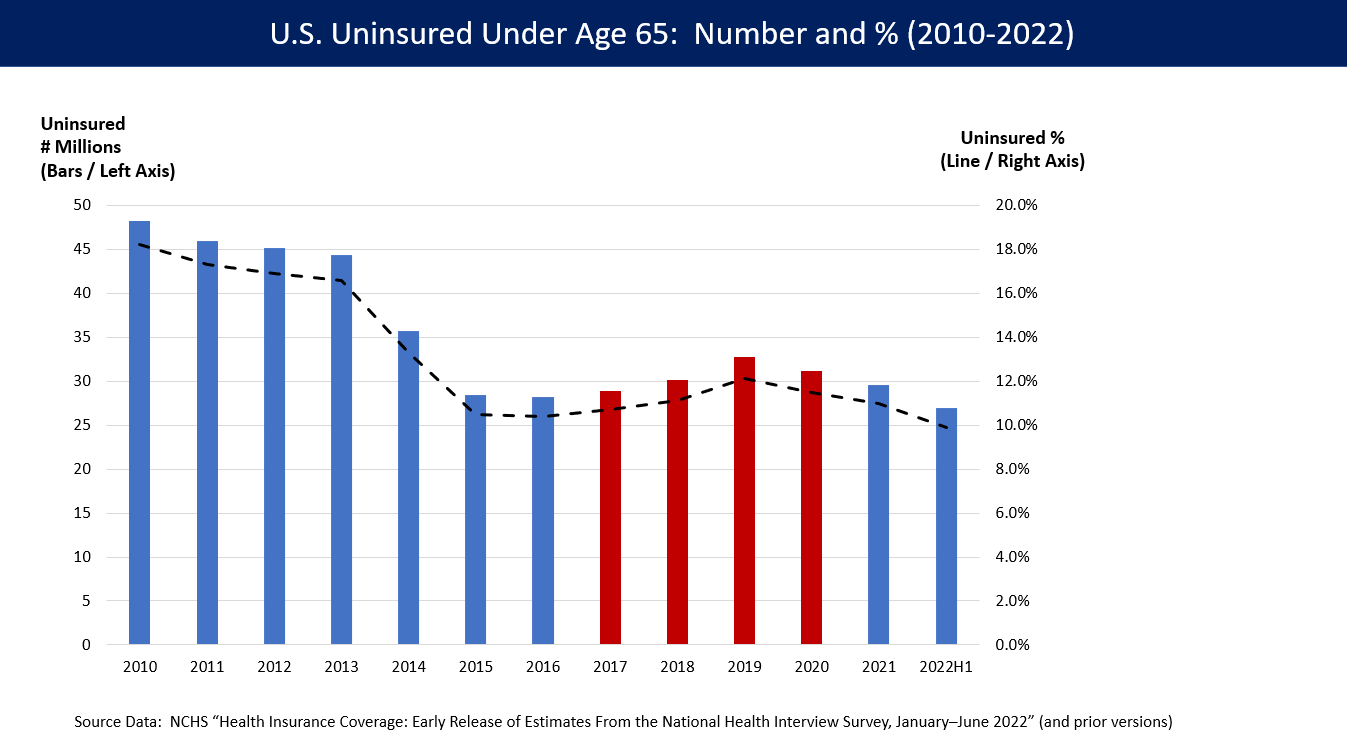
U.S. Uninsured under age 65, number (left axis in millions) and % (right axis) from 2010 to 2022 first half (H1). Blue shows Democratic party president, red a Republican party president. The number and % uninsured under Biden fell to lowest levels since 1997.

Biden has proposed lowering the Medicare age from 65 to 60, and expanding the Affordable Care Act subsidies and eligibility. Some 23 million persons age 60–64 who could directly benefit, either by paying lower insurance premiums or no longer needing to obtain their insurance through an employer. There are about 1.7 million in the 60–64 age range who are uninsured, and 3.2 million who buy coverage because they are not covered by an employer. Hospitals would receive lower reimbursement rates for age 60–64 patients that enroll in Medicare. This plan would also increase the budget deficit, although the CBO has not officially scored the proposal as of January 2021. Lowering the Medicare age is popular, with one poll indicating 85% of Democrats and 69% of Republicans support lowering the eligibility age to as young as 50.

The number of uninsured under age 65 fell from 31.2 million in 2020 under President Trump, to 27.0 million during the first half of 2022 under President Biden, a reduction of 3.2 million or 13%. The percentage of uninsured fell from 11.5% to 9.9% during that time.

== Cryptocurrency ==
In January 2021, Biden suspended any federal regulatory proposal related to cryptocurrency until they can be reviewed by the new administration. This change was part of a freeze for all last-minute regulations put in place by the Trump administration. On November 23, U.S. Senator Sherrod Brown (D–OH), Chairman of the U.S. Senate Committee on Banking, Housing, and Urban Affairs, sent a letter to Tether issuer Bitfinex requesting information about company operations due to concerns that the company was engaged in fraud. On March 9, 2022, Biden issued Executive Order 14067 to federal departments and agencies to assess the benefits and risks of cryptocurrencies, and directed the Federal Reserve to continue its research, development, and assessment efforts for a central bank digital currency (CBDC) for the U.S. dollar. On June 6, the U.S. Office of Government Ethics issued a directive barring federal employees from working on any regulation that could influence the value of digital currencies that they hold. When Voyager Digital filed for Chapter 11 bankruptcy protection on July 6, the Federal Deposit Insurance Corporation (FDIC) began investigating marketing claims made by Voyager that its customer dollar deposit accounts were insured by the agency.

Elizabeth Warren's anti-cryptocurrency stance faced significant opposition within her party in 2024, as dozens of Democrats, including Chuck Schumer, supported efforts to overturn SEC guidelines restricting banks from holding digital assets. This defiance also opposed Biden's veto threat. Amidst 2024 campaign dynamics, with Trump courting crypto supporters, crypto super PACs planned major spending to influence elections and policy. Despite concerns over money laundering and financial risks, key Democrats, including Maxine Waters, remained opposed to the pro-crypto legislation.

=== CFTC ===
On January 3, 2022, the Commodity Futures Trading Commission (CFTC) issued an order requiring Blockratize, Inc. pay a $1.4 million fine for failing to register as a swap execution facility, for offering illegal binary option contracts using cryptocurrency on its prediction market website Polymarket, and to close betting markets in violation of the Commodity Exchange Act. On February 9, CFTC Chairman Rostin Behnam asked the 117th U.S. Congress for the authority to regulate certain cryptocurrencies in testimony before the U.S. Senate Committee on Agriculture, Nutrition, and Forestry. On June 2, the CFTC filed a lawsuit against Gemini alleging that the executive staff of the cryptocurrency exchange made false and misleading statements and omissions in communications with regulators about market manipulation of a bitcoin futures contract the company proposed offering in 2017.

On June 7, U.S. Senators Kirsten Gillibrand (D–NY) and Cynthia Lummis (R–WY) introduced a bill to create a regulatory framework for cryptocurrencies that would treat most digital assets as commodities subject to oversight from the CFTC and would not have cryptocurrencies subject to oversight from the SEC unless a cryptocurrency's holders were entitled to the same privileges as corporate investors. On June 8, Behnam announced support for the bill. At a conference hosted by The Wall Street Journal on June 14, U.S. Securities and Exchange Commission (SEC) Chairman Gary Gensler expressed concern that the Lummis-Gillibrand bill could inadvertently undermine stock market and mutual fund protections, noted that cryptocurrency companies were already engaging in behaviors overseen by the SEC, and argued that some digital assets are securities necessitating oversight from the SEC rather than commodities (even if the overwhelming majority of tokens offered by cryptocurrency exchanges are commodities).

=== Federal Reserve ===
At a conference held by the Bank for International Settlements on March 22, 2021, Federal Reserve Chairman Jerome Powell stated that the Federal Reserve would not issue a central bank digital currency (CBDC) without explicit congressional authorization. On April 28, Powell stated in a press conference following a Federal Open Market Committee (FOMC) policy meeting that the CBDC system that exists in China could not exist in the United States due to privacy concerns. On May 20, Powell issued a press statement announcing that the Board of Governors would release a white paper on a CBDC for the U.S. dollar. On July 14, Powell testified before the U.S. House Financial Services Committee about CBDC, stated that the white paper on creating a CBDC for the U.S. dollar would be released in a few months, and that stablecoins and cryptocurrencies would not be needed if there was a CBDC for the U.S. dollar. At a press conference following an FOMC policy meeting on September 22, Powell stated that the Federal Reserve was continuing work on the white paper. On October 14, United Wholesale Mortgage announced that it would cease a company pilot to accept mortgage loan repayments in bitcoin.

On January 18, 2022, U.S. Representative Tom Emmer (GOP; MN-6) introduced a bill (HR 6415) to prohibit Federal Reserve Banks from issuing a CBDC. On January 20, the Federal Reserve released its CBDC white paper with a 120-day public comment window. On February 18, Federal Reserve Vice Chair Lael Brainard gave a speech arguing in favor of a CBDC at a University of Chicago Booth School of Business forum on monetary policy in the United States. On May 19, House Republican Conference members on the Financial Services Committee sent a letter to Powell expressing concerns about CBDC and its potential effects on monetary policy and privacy rights. On May 26, Brainard testified before the House Financial Services Committee in favor of a CBDC and argued that it could exist alongside stablecoins. At a conference on the role of the U.S. dollar in the international economy hosted by the Federal Reserve Bank of New York on June 17, Powell noted in an opening statement that the public comment window for the Federal Reserve CBDC white paper was still open. On June 22, the office of U.S. Representative Jim Himes (DEM; CT-4) released a white paper supporting a CBDC. On July 8, Brainard called for greater regulation of cryptocurrencies before the industry's size threatens the financial system. In April 2023, Federal Reserve Board Governor Michelle Bowman expressed skepticism for the need of a CBDC for the U.S. dollar in a speech at Georgetown University McDonough School of Business.

=== Justice and homeland security departments ===
On March 5, 2021, McAfee Corp. founder John McAfee was indicted in the Southern New York U.S. District Court for promoting a cryptocurrency pump-and-dump scheme on his Twitter account that he made $23 million from (after being indicted by the Justice Department for tax evasion on money earned from the scheme and sued by the SEC for promoting the scheme the previous October). On May 13, Binance was reportedly under investigation by the U.S. Justice Department and the Internal Revenue Service for usage by users for money laundering and tax evasion. On February 8, 2022, the U.S. Justice Department arrested businessman Ilya Lichtenstein and rapper Heather R. Morgan for attempting to launder and seized $3.6 billion of the $4.5 billion worth of bitcoin allegedly stolen in the 2016 Bitfinex hack, while the U.S. Justice Department immediately filed a request with District of Columbia U.S. District Court Chief Judge Beryl A. Howell to reverse the bail decision made by Southern New York U.S. District Court Magistrate Judge Debra C. Freeman for Lichtenstein and Morgan due to flight risk concerns (with Lictenstein being jailed and Morgan remaining under house arrest with ankle bracelet monitoring instead of allowing both to go free on $5 million and $3 million bail respectively).

On February 24, BitMEX founders Arthur Hayes and Ben Delo plead guilty to charges of violating the anti-money laundering provisions of the Bank Secrecy Act and each agreed to pay a $10 million fine (after the company agreed to pay a $100 million fine in a settlement with the CFTC the previous August). On March 8, the owners and operators of the cryptocurrency companies EmpowerCoin, ECoinPlus, and Jet-Coin were indicted in the Eastern New York U.S. District Court for conspiracy to commit wire fraud and money laundering and for defrauding investors of $40 million. On March 18, the Southern New York U.S. District Court (with Senior Judge P. Kevin Castel presiding) convicted the operator of the World Sports Alliance, a cryptocurrency scam that offered a token called IGObit and claimed to be affiliated with the United Nations, of defrauding 60 investors of hundreds of thousands of dollars. On March 24, the U.S. Justice Department charged two operators of a $1.1 million non-fungible token rug pull called "Frosties" with conspiracy to commit wire fraud and money laundering. On April 25, Alliance of American Football and former Minnesota Vikings minority owner Reggie Fowler plead guilty to charges of bank fraud in a $600 million crypto scheme.

On May 6, the U.S. Justice Department charged the CEO of Mining Capital Coin with operating a fraudulent $62 million crypto scheme. On the same day, FTX CEO Sam Bankman-Fried defined an industry practice known as "yield farming" in an interview with Bloomberg News journalists Matt Levine, Joe Weisenthal, and Tracy Alloway that Levine and Weisenthal stated met the definition of a Ponzi scheme. On May 12, the CEO of EminiFX was charged by the Federal Bureau of Investigation with operating a fraudulent $59 million crypto scheme in Southern New York U.S. District Court. On June 1, a former product manager at OpenSea, a non-fungible token marketplace, was arrested by the Southern New York U.S. Attorney's Office on charges of wire fraud and money laundering in connection with an insider trading scheme that he was dismissed by the company for the previous September. On June 3, the Federal Trade Commission issued a report showing that approximately 46,000 investors lost more than $1 billion in cryptocurrency scams from January 2021 through March 2022 (with $329 million in the first quarter of 2022).

On June 6, Reuters reported that Binance had facilitated $2.35 billion in money laundering from 2017 to 2021. On June 29, a Freedom of Information Act request stated that Coinbase had shared blockchain technology for investigating financial crimes with U.S. Immigration and Customs Enforcement. On June 30, the U.S. Justice Department filed securities fraud charges against the leaders of EmpiresX, a more than $100 million cryptocurrency exchange Ponzi scheme. On the same day, the Federal Bureau of Investigation (FBI) added Ruja Ignatova to its Ten Most Wanted Fugitives List for the $4 billion OneCoin Ponzi scheme. On July 19, the FBI issued a public warning that stated that fraudulent cryptocurrency mobile phone applications had defrauded 244 investors of $42 million since the previous October. On July 21, three former Coinbase employees were indicted in the Southern New York U.S. District Court for an alleged insider trading scheme involving $1.5 million worth of cryptocurrency assets listed on the exchange, while the SEC filed an insider trading lawsuit against the same employees in the Western Washington U.S. District Court.

=== Treasury and labor departments ===
During Janet Yellen's confirmation hearing for Secretary of the Treasury, U.S. Senator Maggie Hassan (D-NH) asked about the use of cryptocurrency by terrorists and other criminals. "Cryptocurrencies are a particular concern," Yellen responded. "I think many are used—at least in a transactions sense—mainly for illicit financing." She said she wanted to "examine ways in which we can curtail their use and make sure that [money laundering] doesn't occur through those channels." On May 13, 2021, Binance was reportedly under investigation by the U.S. Justice Department and the Internal Revenue Service (IRS) for usage by users for money laundering and tax evasion. On August 4, IRS officials stated that the agency had seized $1.2 billion worth of bitcoin during fiscal year 2021.

On August 6, the Biden administration released a press statement announcing support for the cryptocurrency tax reporting amendment to the Infrastructure Investment and Jobs Act proposed by U.S. Senators Rob Portman (R–OH), Kyrsten Sinema (D–AZ), and Mark Warner (D–VA) rather than the amendment proposed by U.S. Senators Cynthia Lummis (R–WY), Pat Toomey (R–PA), and Ron Wyden (D–OR). On August 9, a compromise amendment proposed by Toomey, Warner, Lummis, Sinema, and Portman (No. 2656) failed to pass on a unanimous consent vote called by Toomey when Senator Richard Shelby (R–AL) objected to the amendment if it did not include a defense infrastructure spending amendment he introduced (No. 2535), which Toomey agreed to but Senators Bernie Sanders (I–VT) and Tom Carper (D–DE) objected to.

On November 15, President Biden signed the Infrastructure Investment and Jobs Act into law with the original language in the bill related to cryptocurrency tax reporting and definition of cryptocurrency brokers. On March 10, 2022, the Employee Benefits Security Administration of the U.S. Labor Department issued a compliance assistance release warning financial services companies against including cryptocurrencies in 401(k)s and other retirement plans and to use extreme caution if doing so. On April 20, the U.S. Treasury Department sanctioned Russian bitcoin miners as the 2022 Russian invasion of Ukraine entered its third month. On May 6, the Treasury Department sanctioned Blender.io, a cryptocurrency mixer, from the U.S. financial system due to its usage by the Lazarus Group (a cybercrime organization operated by the North Korean government) to launder $20.5 million of cryptocurrency associated with Axie Infinity.

== Unions ==
On January 22, 2021, Biden issued Executive Order 14003 that removed Schedule F, overturning a number of Trump's policies that limited the collective bargaining power of federal unions. He called on Amazon workers to vote for union representation in a closely watched election in Alabama. This was stronger support than any president has given unions in decades. However the workers defeated the proposal 71% to 29%, enhancing Amazon's reputation as a leading bulwark against unionization. Labor activists said Biden's advocacy would build his support in the working class, fighting off Republican inroads there.

He was criticized by some union activists for signing a bill to force an end to the 2022 United States railroad labor dispute that did not contain the union's target of paid sick leave. However, the Biden administration was also influential in securing a later deal to provide paid sick leave to those rail workers.

Biden appointed two of the five members of the National Labor Relations Board, which enacted many policies that boosted unions during his presidency. These were seen as a factor in an increase in labor strikes in 2023, which won unions several wins, such as increased pay and better working conditions.

In September 2023, Biden became the first United States president to ever march in a picket line with a union, when he joined a strike with the United Auto Workers.

== Taxation and deficits ==
=== Individual taxes ===
Biden has pledged to raise taxes only on individual persons earning over $200,000, or $400,000 for married couples filing jointly. Treasury Secretary nominee Janet Yellen reiterated Biden's pledge in her answers during her Senate confirmation hearing process in January 2021. The individual tax cuts in President Trump's Tax Cuts and Jobs Act are scheduled to expire after 2025, for all income levels. This means they automatically revert to the higher rates of the Obama administration, in the absence of new legislation.

=== Corporate taxes ===
Biden has proposed raising the corporate tax rate from 21% to 28%. This rate was lowered by the Republican's 2017 Tax Cuts and Jobs Act from 35% to 21%, so Biden's proposal represents a partial reversal. The 21% tax rate does not expire, in contrast to the individual rates, so legislation would be required to raise it.

=== International taxation ===
Finance officials from 130 countries agreed on July 1, 2021, to plans for a new international taxation policy. All the major economies agreed to pass national laws that would require corporations to pay at least 15% income tax in the countries they operate. This new policy would end the practice of locating world headquarters in small countries with very low taxation rates. Governments hope to recoup some of the lost revenue, estimated at $100 billion to $240 billion each year. The new system was promoted by the Biden administration and the Organization for Economic Cooperation and Development (OECD). Secretary-General Mathias Cormann of the OECD said, "This historic package will ensure that large multinational companies pay their fair share of tax everywhere."

== Budget deficit ==
The first year that President Biden budgeted is fiscal 2022, which runs from October 1, 2021, to September 30, 2022. CBO forecast in July 2021 that the budget deficit in fiscal year 2022 will be $1.2 trillion, or 4.7% GDP. This would be a significant reduction to the budget deficits of $3.1 trillion (15.0% GDP) in FY2020 (the last fiscal year fully budgeted by President Trump) and $2.8 trillion (12.4% GDP) in FY2021. Those two record annual budget deficits were unusually high, primarily due to response measures to the Coronavirus pandemic.

During February 2021, the CBO forecast budget deficits for 2021–2031, based on legislation in effect as of January 12, 2021, prior to the American Rescue Plan Act (ARPA). This represents the deficit trajectory inherited by Biden; the deficit impact of his policies may be measured against that baseline. CBO later published a baseline including the impact of ARPA. OMB then published its forecast for Biden's fiscal 2022 budget, which includes ARPA plus Biden's American Jobs Plan and American Families Plan. These amounts are shown in the following table:

Federal budget deficit ($ Billions)	2020A	2021F	2022F	2023F	2024F	2025F	2026F	2027F	2028F	2029F	2030F	2031F	Total 2022-2031F
CBO February 2021 Baseline	3,132	2,258	1,056	963	905	1,037	1,026	1,048	1,352	1,346	1,650	1,883	12,266
CBO Baseline Including ARPA	3,132	3,423	1,589	1,083	972	1,080	1,036	1,060	1,375	1,371	1,674	1,913	13,153
Budget FY2022 per OMB	3,129	3,669	1,837	1,372	1,359	1,470	1,414	1,303	1,424	1,307	1,477	1,568	14,531

Deficits in fiscal 2021 and 2022 will be significantly increased by ARPA, although the impact falls thereafter. The budget deficit is expected to fall mid-decade as pandemic-related spending fades and the economy returns to normal. Thereafter, deficits rise due to the long-term trends of an aging country (e.g., fewer workers per retiree) and healthcare costs rising faster than GDP growth.

== Theoretical economic perspectives ==
In terms of theoretical economic perspectives, Bidenomics stands in striking contrast to the previously dominant economic model, known globally as the Washington consensus, or (among its opponents) as neoliberalism. Milton Friedman was the intellectual godfather, with a base in the Chicago school of economics. It was the dominant economic policy of Western nations from Ronald Reagan in the United States in the 1980s through the presidencies of George H.W. Bush, Bill Clinton, George W. Bush, and Barack Obama, as well as the British leaders Margaret Thatcher, Tony Blair and David Cameron. According to Greg Ip of the Wall Street Journal, "Bidenomics Seeks to Remake the Economic Consensus: Declaring end to neoliberalism, new thinkers play down constraints of deficits, inflation and incentives"

Bidenomics draws on an even older economic heritage going back to John Maynard Keynes in the 1930s, and including Americans Walter Heller, James Tobin, and Arthur Okun in the 1960s. Versions of Keynesianism were the dominant American and British economic theory before the 1970s. Politically, American liberals and Democrats have leaned toward Keynes; Republicans and conservatives favored the Chicago School, though Trump also widely used tariffs, which are at odds with conventional wisdom among the advocates of Chicago School.

=== Macroeconomics ===
The traditional view is that the economy is built around scarcity, because the demand for labor and capital and everything else is unlimited. To achieve full employment and faster growth, more work is needed and more incentives to work. Monetary and fiscal policy is seldom needed, since the market system naturally produces optimum results. Bidenomics argues that slack is the main problem, not scarcity. The market system is typically stuck below optimal levels. Full employment and growth is held back by a lack of demand, and needs the stimulation of aggressive fiscal policies such as deficit spending, as well as monetary policies to keep cash flowing.

=== Budget deficits ===
Bidenomics holds that the developed world is awash in surplus savings, which has produced very low interest rates. Absorbing some of this huge pool of savings through large deficits will not divert private investments, and will not raise interest rates. As for tax rates, the very low interest rates makes covering the national debt much easier.

=== Welfare state ===
Bidenomics says the government should be promoting the national welfare, and a critical ingredient in our society is caring for dependents – especially children and elderly parents. It is a technical flaw in the definition of Gross Domestic Product that unpaid household care is not included, even though it is so important. The Biden American Rescue Plan that became law in March 2021 includes a greatly expanded child tax credit.

=== Taxation and globalization ===
The old view strongly emphasized the wisdom of lowering income taxes, arguing that high rates discourage work, discourage investment, slow growth, and render the U.S. less competitive in a globalized world. Furthermore, the minimum wage reduces employment. The new view is that more danger comes from monopoly power, especially as exerted by the giant high tech companies such as Facebook, Google, and Amazon. Taxation, regulation and anti-trust laws should be used to control them. Furthermore, the status quo is creating many multi-billionaires, who largely evade taxation. The result is rapidly growing inequality that is politically and socially destabilizing.

The old view warns that labor unions were the monopolies to worry about and fight against; Biden has been a strong supporter of labor unions. The new view cites research to show that people paying higher tax rates do not make less effort, and high minimum wages do not reduce employment. However the minimum wage does pull millions of families out of poverty. As for globalization, the new view warns that while globalization raises total world output, it also moves American jobs to China and elsewhere; the new view warns against China as a threat to long-term American economic interests. Tariffs, which were strongly opposed in the old view, now become a useful weapon.

Regarding China, Bidenomics is somewhat parallel to the Trump administration policy. The old view called for lowering American tax rates to remain competitive internationally, while in April 2021 Biden proposed a different approach: the United States would work with the European Community, Britain, Japan and other friendly nations to form a standardized international minimum income tax. The goal is to stop the globalization process whereby companies relocate headquarters into the international host with the lowest tax.

=== Unemployment ===
Unemployment has had its longest run under 4% in 70 years, leading to wage growth at the bottom of the income distribution and reversing some income inequality.

== Public perceptions of economy ==
Inflation peaked at 9.0% in June 2022 began swiftly abating and by November 2023 the inflation rate stood at 3.2% and summer 2024 had returned near target levels. GDP growth, job creation and wage growth remained strong under Biden, with a sustained nearly 50-year-low unemployment rate. Polls, however, indicated broad public discontent with the Biden economy, though data showed consumers continued spending, taking vacations and changing jobs as though they believed the economy was good.

A March 2024 CBS News poll found that 65% of Americans viewed the economy under Biden's predecessor, Donald Trump, as good, whereas only 38% expressed a similar positive opinion of the current economy under Biden.

People tend to see their own economic reality and that of their local and state economies as doing better than the national economy, hinting at a disconnect fueled more by media narrative.

In the 2024 presidential election, two thirds of voters called the economy "not-so-good" or "poor" in exit polls, with 69% of them voting for Donald Trump, who defeated Biden's vice president, Kamala Harris. An exit poll found 45% of voters stated their personal finances were in worse shape than four years prior. The high inflation under Biden, compared to Trump, has been credited for Trump's victory.

== See also ==
- Economic policy of the first Donald Trump administration
- Economic policy of the second Donald Trump administration
- Federal Trade Commission#Biden administration
- Net neutrality in the United States#Under the Biden administration (2021–present)
- Political positions of Joe Biden § Economic issues
