= What Did I Miss (disambiguation) =

"What Did I Miss?" is a 2025 song by Drake.

What Did I Miss may also refer to:

- "What Did I Miss?", episode 5b in the eighth season of Trolls: The Beat Goes On!
- What Did I Miss, a defunct Headgum podcast
- "What Did I Miss?", a 2008 song by Devon Werkheiser
- A catchphrase of the character Harry Solomon from the TV series 3rd Rock from the Sun

== See also ==
- "What'd I Miss?", a song from the 2015 musical Hamilton
- "What'd I Miss?", episode 14 of season 8 of The Next Step
- "What'd I Miss?", episode 34 of Phineas and Ferb season 3
- "What Did You Miss?", a song from Spamilton, a 2016 musical parody
- What'd You Miss, a TV show hosted by Joe Weisenthal
