= Carnegie Classification of Institutions of Higher Education =

Classification system in the United States

The Carnegie Classification of Institutions of Higher Education, or simply the Carnegie Classification, is a framework for classifying colleges and universities in the United States. It was created in 1970 by the Carnegie Foundation for the Advancement of Teaching. It is managed by the American Council on Education.

The framework primarily serves educational and research purposes, where it is often important to identify groups of roughly comparable institutions. The classification generally focuses on types of degrees awarded and related level of activity such as research. The classification includes all accredited, degree-granting colleges and universities in the United States that are represented in the National Center for Education Statistics' Integrated Postsecondary Education Data System (IPEDS).

== History ==
The Carnegie Classification was created by the Carnegie Commission on Higher Education in 1970. The classification was first published in 1973 with updates in 1976, 1987, 1994, 2000, 2005, 2010, 2015, 2018 and 2021. To ensure continuity of the classification framework and to allow comparison across years, the 2015 Classification update retains the same structure of six parallel classifications, initially adopted in 2005. The 2005 report substantially reworked the classification system, based on data from the 2002–2003 and 2003–2004 school years.

In 2015, the Carnegie Foundation transferred responsibility for the Carnegie Classification of Institutions of Higher Education to the Center for Postsecondary Research of the Indiana University School of Education in Bloomington, Indiana. The voluntary Classification on Community Engagement was managed by the Public Purpose Institute at Albion College in Albion, Michigan. In March 2022, both the universal and elective Carnegie classifications moved to the nonprofit American Council on Education in Washington, D.C.

The Carnegie Classifications underwent a significant update in 2025, overhauling their Basic Classification and replacing it with a new Institutional Classification. This new structure evaluates institutions based on multiple factors instead of categorizing institutions based on the highest degree awarded as was done under the prior framework.

Information used in these classifications comes primarily from IPEDS and the College Board.

== Basic classification ==
The number of institutions in each category is indicated in parentheses.

=== Associate colleges ===
Associate's colleges are institutions that primarily award associate degrees.

- Mixed Associate Large (78)
- Mixed Associate Medium (265)
- Mixed Associate Small (204)
- Professions-focused Associate Large/Medium (193)
- Professions-focused Associate Small (168)

=== Associate/Baccalaureate ===
Institutions that primarily award associate degrees, but that also award bachelor’s or graduate degrees.

- Mixed associate/baccalaureate (50)
- Professions-focused associate/baccalaureate (51)

=== Baccalaureate ===
Baccalaureate institutions primarily award bachelor's degrees and do not have notable graduate programs.

- Mixed baccalaureate (82)
- Professions-focused baccalaureate medium (53)
- Professions-focused baccalaureate small (247)

=== Undergraduate/Graduate-Master’s ===
These institutions have both graduate and undergraduate programs, but do not have notable doctorate programs.

- Mixed Undergraduate/Graduate-Master’s large/medium (87)
- Mixed Undergraduate/Graduate-Master’s small (39)
- Professions-focused Undergraduate/Graduate-Master’s large/medium (129)
- Professions-focused Undergraduate/Graduate-Master’s small (121)

=== Undergraduate/Graduate-Doctorate ===
These institutions have both undergraduate and graduate programs through the doctorate level.

- Mixed Undergraduate/Graduate-Doctorate large (107)
- Mixed Undergraduate/Graduate-Doctorate medium (100)
- Mixed Undergraduate/Graduate-Doctorate small (30)
- Professions-focused Undergraduate/Graduate-Doctorate large (41)
- Professions-focused Undergraduate/Graduate-Doctorate medium (135)
- Professions-focused Undergraduate/Graduate-Doctorate small (58)

=== Special focus institutions ===
Special Focus institutions focus on or award degrees primarily in a single category.

- Applied and career studies (323)
- Arts and sciences (221)
- Arts, music, and design (89)
- Business (120)
- Graduate studies (68)
- Law (27)
- Medical schools and centers (68)
- Nursing (240)
- Other health professions (197)
- Technology, engineering, and sciences (42)
- Theological studies (294)

== Research designation ==
Beginning in 2025, research designations are awarded separately from institutional classifications. Institutions are classified by their amount of research spending and number of research doctorates awarded.

- Research 1 (R1): Very high spending and doctorate production (187)
- Research 2 (R2): High spending and doctorate production (139)
- Research colleges and universities (216)

== Size and setting ==
Size and Setting classifies institutions according to (a) size of their student body and (b) percentage of students who reside on campus.

=== Size ===
The size of institutions is based on their full-time equivalent (FTE) enrollment. FTEs are calculated by adding the number of full-time students to one-third the number of part-time students. Two-year colleges are classified using a different scale than four-year and higher institutions.

- Very small two-year (VS2)—fewer than 500 FTEs attend this two-year institution.
- Small two-year (S2)—at least 500 but fewer than 2000 FTEs attend this two-year institution.
- Medium two-year (M2)—at least 2000 but fewer than 5000 FTEs attend this two-year institution.
- Large two-year (L2)—at least 5000 but fewer than 10000 FTEs attend this two-year institution.
- Very large two-year (VL2)—10000 or more FTEs attend this two-year institution.
- Very small four-year (VS4)—fewer than 1000 FTEs attend this four-year institution.
- Small four-year (S4)—at least 1000 but fewer than 3000 FTEs attend this four-year institution.
- Medium four-year (M4)—at least 3000 but fewer than 10000 FTEs attend this four-year institution.
- Large four-year (L4)—more than 10000 FTEs attend this four-year institution.

=== Setting ===
Setting is based on the percentage of full-time undergraduates who live in institutionally-managed housing. Two-year institutions are not classified by setting.

- Primarily nonresidential (NR)—fewer than 25 percent of degree-seeking undergraduates or fewer than 50 percent enrolled full-time live on campus.
- Primarily residential (R): (a)—at least 25 percent of degree-seeking undergraduates live on campus and (b) at least 50 percent but fewer than 80 percent attend full-time.
- Highly residential (HR)—at least half of degree-seeking undergraduates live on campus and at least 80 percent attend full-time.

== 2005 edition ==
The 2005 classification scheme introduced a "set of multiple, parallel classifications" that are "organized around three central questions: 1) What is taught, 2) to whom, and 3) in what setting?" wrote Alexander McCormick, a senior scholar at the Carnegie Foundation and director of the classifications project.

As of 2005, the Carnegie Foundation was developing one or more voluntary classification schemes that rely on data submitted by institutions. The first focuses on outreach and community engagement, and the second on "how institutions seek to analyze, understand, and improve undergraduate education."

The Carnegie Foundation has no plans to issue printed editions of the classifications. Their website has several tools that let researchers and administrators view classifications.

=== Revisions in the basic classification ===
The 2005 revision also introduced the "basic classification", an update of the original classification scheme that:

1. Changes the names of some categories.
2. Splits Associate colleges into subcategories. This is based on the work of Stephen Katsinas, Vincent Lacey, and David Hardy at the University of Alabama and is an update of work funded in the 1990s by the Ford Foundation.
3. Categorizes doctorate-granting institutions according to their level of research activity. This level is calculated using multiple measures, financial and otherwise.
4. Simplifies the measurement of doctorate degrees awarded.
5. Divides Master's colleges and universities into three categories based on the number of Master's degrees awarded.
6. Deprecates "Liberal Arts" terminology.
7. Modifies the criteria separating Master's and Baccalaureate institutions. Institutions formerly classified as Master's Colleges and Universities are now classified as Baccalaureate Colleges.
8. Requires institutions to have higher levels of single-field or related-field concentration for designation as special-focus institutions and utilizes more sources of information to identify special-focus institutions.
9. Splits the "Schools of engineering and technology" category into two categories and eliminates the "Teacher's colleges" category.
10. Measures and classifies service academies using the same criteria as other institutions.

== See also ==
- Association of American Universities
- List of research universities in the United States
- List of higher education associations and organizations in the United States
