= Borrower Defense to Repayment =

US Federal regulation for student loan forgiveness due to fraud

Borrower Defense to Repayment (often simply stated as Borrower Defense) is a federal regulation in the United States that can serve as a defense for not repaying student loans in certain situations. It allows for forgiveness of loans if the borrower can prove the school they attended defrauded them at the time they applied for the loan. The regulation was put in place in 1994 and faced numerous subsequent court challenges.

== Background ==
In 1994, the United States Congress expanded the Higher Education Act, creating rules that allowed students to have a defense against repayment of student loans if they were misled by their college or university. The borrower defense rule went into effect in 1994, then was rewritten in 2016, 2019, and 2022. Borrower defense claims grew starting in 2015, when Corinthian Colleges shut down. This followed a ruling by the United States Department of Education that the company had "engaged in widespread and pervasive misrepresentations" as it related to student's future job prospects.

== Litigation ==
=== Sweet v. McMahon ===
Sweet v. McMahon
- Court: Northern District of California
- Started: June 25, 2019; 7 years ago
- Docket nos.: 4:19-cv-03674 (N.D. Cal.); 26-1136 (9th Cir.)

Case history
- Prior action
- Appealed to: Court of Appeals for the Ninth Circuit

Court membership
- Judges sitting: Haywood Gilliam (since Dec 31, 2025); William Alsup (until Dec 31, 2025)

The financial collapse of Corinthian Colleges in 2015, resulted in many new borrower defense applications. By 2019, there was a backlog of more than 210,000 pending applications. Sweet v. McMahon (originally Sweet v. DeVos and formerly Sweet v. Cardona), was a lawsuit filed in 2019 claiming that the United States Department of Education had unreasonably delayed or unlawfully held relief on these applications.

In August 2022, a federal judge granted approval of a settlement in the case, allowing the student loans of 200,000 borrowers to be cancelled. After the settlement was approved, several colleges, including Everglades College, Lincoln Technical Institute, and American National University, petitioned the United States Supreme Court for review (in hopes of having the settlement reduced or otherwise made less burdensome to them). The request was rejected by the court in April 2023, allowing the settlement to move forward.

=== Biden administration ===
During his presidency, President Joe Biden forgave more than $17 billion in student loans under the Borrower Defense Rule as part of his economic policy. The Biden administration rewrote the Borrower Defense Rule in 2022 to clarify when a claim could be filed.

In 2023, the administration was sued by the Career Colleges and Schools of Texas. The lawsuit argued that Biden's modification of borrower defense made it too easy for students to engage in the process of having their loans forgiven. The initial ruling in 2023 was in favor of the Career Colleges and Schools of Texas, stating that a borrower cannot claim a defense until they are sued by the government to collect on a defaulted loan. It was appealed to the U.S. Supreme Court in Department of Education v. Career Colleges and Schools of Texas.

=== Trump administration ===
The Trump administration defended the Biden-backed modification, agreeing that a student can claim defense prior to default on the loan. As of 2025, oral arguments have not yet been scheduled with the court.
