= Higher Education Relief Opportunities For Students Act =

2002 United States law

Higher Education Relief Opportunities For Students Act of 2001
- Long title: An act to provide the Secretary of Education with specific waiver authority to respond to a war or other military operation or national emergency.
- Enacted by: the 107th United States Congress

Citations
- Public law: 107-122

Codification
- Acts amended: Higher Education Act of 1965

Legislative history
- Introduced in the Senate as S. 1793 by Susan Collins (R–ME) on December 10, 2001; Committee consideration by Senate Health, Education, Labor and Pensions; Passed the Senate on December 4, 2001 (by unanimous consent); Passed the House on December 20, 2001 (by unanimous consent); Signed into law by President George W. Bush on January 16, 2002

United States Supreme Court cases
- Biden v. Nebraska, No. 22-506, 600 U.S. ___ (2023); Department of Education v. Brown, No. 22-535, 600 U.S. ___ (2023)

The Higher Education Relief Opportunities For Students (HEROES) Act (Pub. L. 108–76 (text) (PDF)) was legislation passed unanimously by the United States Congress and signed into law by President George W. Bush on January 16, 2002. It was extended and amended in 2003, extended in 2005, and made permanent in 2007.

The act allows the U.S. Secretary of Education to grant waivers or relief to recipients of student financial aid programs under Title IV of the Higher Education Act of 1965, "in connection with a war or other military operation or national emergency." It allows waiving of statutory or regulatory requirements related to federal student loans for three categories of individuals: active-duty military or National Guard officials, those who reside or are employed in a declared disaster area, or those who have suffered direct economic hardship as a result of wars, military operations, or national emergencies.

== Extensions ==
The statute originally set the expiry date for the waiver authority on September 30, 2003. In 2003, Congress extended the expiry date to September 30, 2005 and made several amendments (Pub. L. 108–76 (text) (PDF)). In 2005, Congress extended the expiry date to September 30, 2007 (Pub. L. 109–78 (text) (PDF)). In 2007, Congress eliminated the expiry date, making the waiver authority permanent (Pub. L. 110–93 (text) (PDF)). In each case, the extensions were passed unanimously by both chambers of Congress, except for one dissenting vote in the House in 2003.

== Use during the COVID-19 pandemic ==
During the national emergency declared due to the COVID-19 pandemic in the United States, the HEROES Act was invoked several times. In March 2020, the CARES Act passed by Congress included a pause on federal student loans repayments and interest until September 30, 2020. On August 8, 2020, the Trump administration issued a memorandum instructing the Secretary of Education to pause on student loan payments and interest through December 31, 2020 using the authority granted by the HEROES Act. On December 5, the administration extended the pause through January 31, 2021. During 2021−22, the newly inaugurated Biden administration extended the pause several more times, announcing that a final extension would last through December 31, 2022.

In October 2021, the Biden administration used the HEROES Act to reform a student debt forgiveness program for public workers. In August 2022, the administration used the act again to announce student debt cancellation of up to $20,000 and several other reforms. Following litigation brought by several Republican-led state governments, the Supreme Court ruled in Biden v. Nebraska (2023) that the statute did not permit the administration's debt forgiveness program.
