= Biden v. Nebraska =

- Supreme Court of the United States

Argued February 28, 2023 Decided June 30, 2023
- Full case name: Joseph R. Biden, President of the United States, et al. v. Nebraska, et al.
- Docket no.: 22-506
- Citations: 600 U.S. 477 (more) 143 S. Ct. 2355
- Argument: Oral argument
- Opinion announcement: Opinion announcement
- Decision: Opinion

Questions presented
- (1) Whether respondents have Article III standing; and (2) Whether the student loan forgiveness plan exceeds the Secretary of Education's statutory authority or is arbitrary and capricious.

Holding
- 1. At least Missouri has standing to challenge the Secretary’s program.; 2. The HEROES Act allows the Secretary to "waive or modify" existing statutory or regulatory provisions applicable to financial assistance programs under the Education Act, but does not allow the Secretary to rewrite that statute to the extent of canceling $430 billion of student loan principal.

Court membership
- Chief Justice John Roberts Associate Justices Clarence Thomas · Samuel Alito; Sonia Sotomayor · Elena Kagan; Neil Gorsuch · Brett Kavanaugh; Amy Coney Barrett · Ketanji Brown Jackson

Case opinions
- Majority: Roberts, joined by Thomas, Alito, Gorsuch, Kavanaugh, Barrett
- Concurrence: Barrett
- Dissent: Kagan, joined by Sotomayor, Jackson

Laws applied
- U.S. Const. art. III; HEROES Act; Administrative Procedure Act

Biden v. Nebraska, 600 U.S. 477 (2023), was a United States Supreme Court case related to the forgiveness of federal student loans by the Biden administration in 2022, challenged by multiple states. The Supreme Court's ruling was issued on June 30, 2023, ruling 6–3 that the Secretary of Education did not have the power to waive student loans under the HEROES Act.

Biden was heard and decided alongside Department of Education v. Brown, 600 U.S. 551 (2023), in which members within the student loan program had sued the debt forgiveness program. That case was vacated on the basis of the student loan members' lack of standing.

== Background ==
While campaigning for president in 2020, Joe Biden promised to cancel up to $10,000 of federal student loan debt per borrower. After being elected president, Biden called for the 117th U.S. Congress to pass a bill to facilitate $10,000 in student loan forgiveness. In August 2022, Biden announced that he would use executive action to forgive $10,000 in student loans for borrowers earning less than $125,000 individually and $250,000 as married couples, including an additional $10,000 for Pell Grant recipients. The Biden administration invoked the HEROES Act as the basis for his executive authority to forgive loans. In particular, the administration used language saying that the U.S. Secretary of Education has the authority to "waive or modify any statutory or regulatory provision applicable to the student financial assistance programs under Title IV" of the Higher Education Act of 1965 to ensure that "affected individuals" are not placed in a worse position financially in relation to that financial assistance. Affected individuals include, among others, those who "reside or are employed in an area declared a disaster area in connection with a national emergency" and those who "suffered direct economic hardship as a result of a war, military operation, or national emergency."

On September 29, 2022, Nebraska, Missouri, Arkansas, Iowa, Kansas and South Carolina filed suit in the Eastern Missouri U.S. District Court challenging the forgiveness program, asserting that it violated separation of powers and the Administrative Procedure Act. The states asserted they had standing because the American Rescue Plan Act of 2021 bars them from taxing loans that are discharged for three years. Missouri in particular also asserted that it had standing because the Higher Education Loan Authority of the State of Missouri (MOHELA) is a public entity that would lose revenue from student loan forgiveness and become less able to fund Missouri's student financial aid program. On October 20, 2022, district judge Henry Autrey dismissed the suit, holding that the states lacked standing to sue. The states appealed, and on November 14, 2022, the U.S. 8th Circuit Court of Appeals granted an injunction pending appeal.

Separately, on October 10, 2022, two student loan borrowers who did not qualify for the proposed debt forgiveness filed a lawsuit in the Northern Texas U.S. District Court, seeking to vacate the student loan forgiveness program. The borrowers asserted they had standing due to their inability to voice their disagreement with the program through a formal notice-and-comment rule making process required by the Administrative Procedure Act. The two borrowers were backed by the conservative advocacy organization Job Creators Network.

On November 10, 2022, district judge Mark Pittman issued an order to strike down the student loan forgiveness program. On November 30, 2022, the U.S. 5th Circuit Court of Appeals declined to issue a hold on the order in response to an appeal from the U.S. Department of Education.

== Supreme Court ==
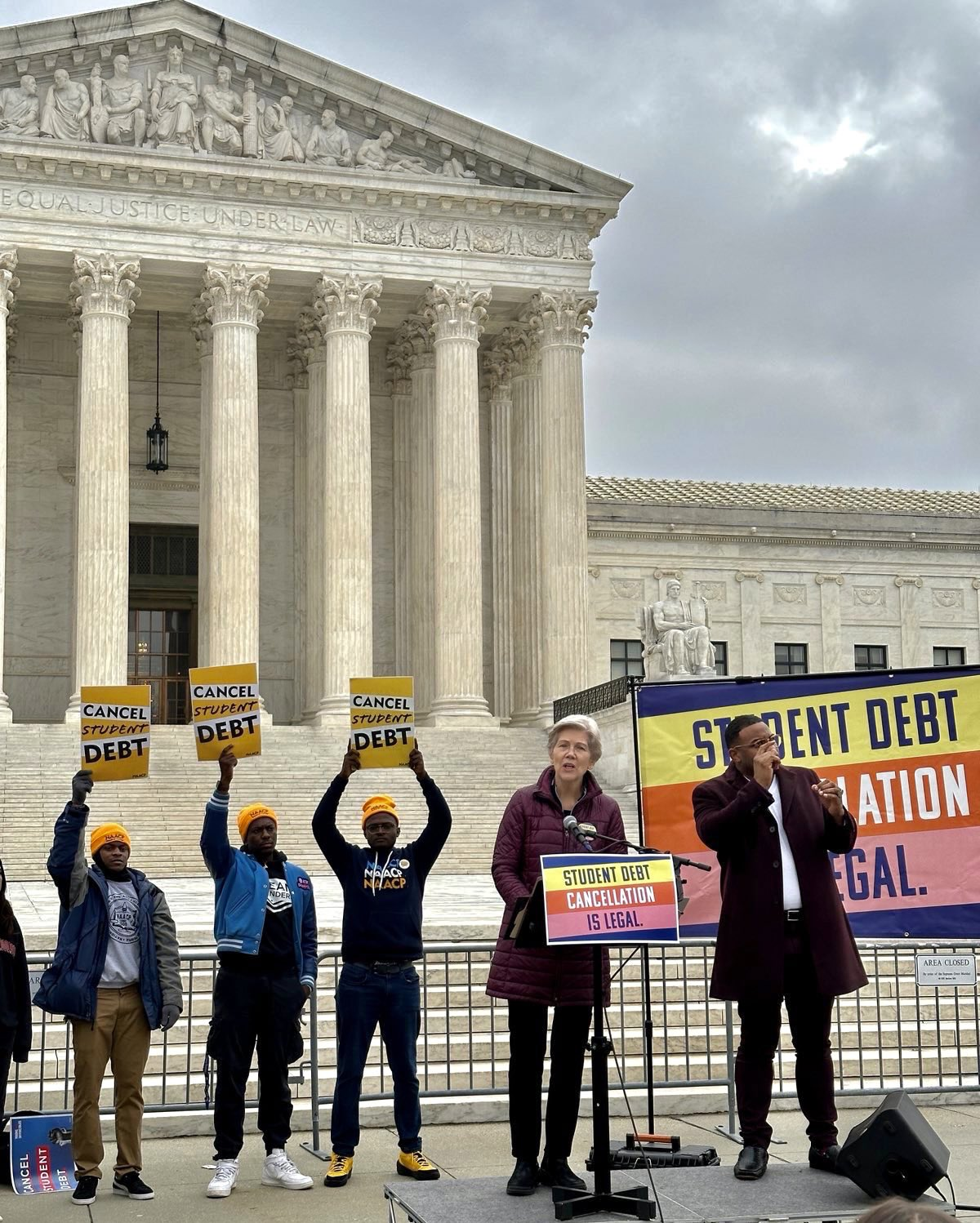
United States Senator Elizabeth Warren speaks at a demonstration in support of student debt cancellation outside of the United States Supreme Court Building on February 28, 2023

After the 8th Circuit granted an injunction pending appeal, the federal government sought to vacate the stay at the Supreme Court on November 18, 2022. On December 1, 2022, the court deferred resolution of the application, granted certiorari before judgment and set the case for argument in the February 2023 sitting. On December 2, 2022, the Biden administration requested that the court either hear the government's appeal from Pittman's order alongside the Nebraska case or issue a hold on his order. On December 12, the Supreme Court agreed to hear arguments in the second case initiated by the student loan borrowers, Department of Education v. Brown, jointly with Biden v. Nebraska. On January 4, 2023, the Justice and Education Departments filed a brief with the Court that argued that the plaintiffs failed to demonstrate legal injury from the proposal and thereby lacked standing under Article III, and that denied the claims made by the plaintiffs that the administration was overstepping its statutory authority in promulgating the proposal under the HEROES Act.

Oral arguments for both Department of Education v. Brown and Biden v. Nebraska were held on February 28, 2023. Many journalists and legal commentators said that, based on oral arguments, the Court seemed likely to overturn the debt relief program.

On June 30, 2023, the Court issued a 6–3 decision in Biden v. Nebraska, striking down the debt forgiveness program. The majority opinion was by Chief Justice John Roberts and joined by Justices Samuel Alito, Clarence Thomas, Neil Gorsuch, Brett Kavanaugh, and Amy Coney Barrett. After first establishing that at least Missouri had Article III standing to challenge the debt forgiveness program, Roberts held that the statutory grant of authority to the Secretary of Education to "waive or modify" loan terms could not be extended to the student loan forgiveness program, and that debt cancellation of this scale required clear congressional authorization and fell under the major questions doctrine. The Court also issued a unanimous decision authored by Justice Alito for Department of Education v. Brown, holding that the plaintiffs did not have standing.

The dissenting opinion was by Justice Elena Kagan and joined by Sonia Sotomayor and Ketanji Brown Jackson.

== Impact ==
President Biden responded to the Supreme Court's decision by pledging a new effort to cancel student loans using the Higher Education Act of 1965. He also contrasted the debt forgiveness program with the Paycheck Protection Program. The Supreme Court's ruling in Biden v. Nebraska was used as guidance in implementing preliminary injunctions against further proposals to forgive student loans via the SAVE repayment plan.
