= Integrated Postsecondary Education Data System =

U.S. core higher education data collection program

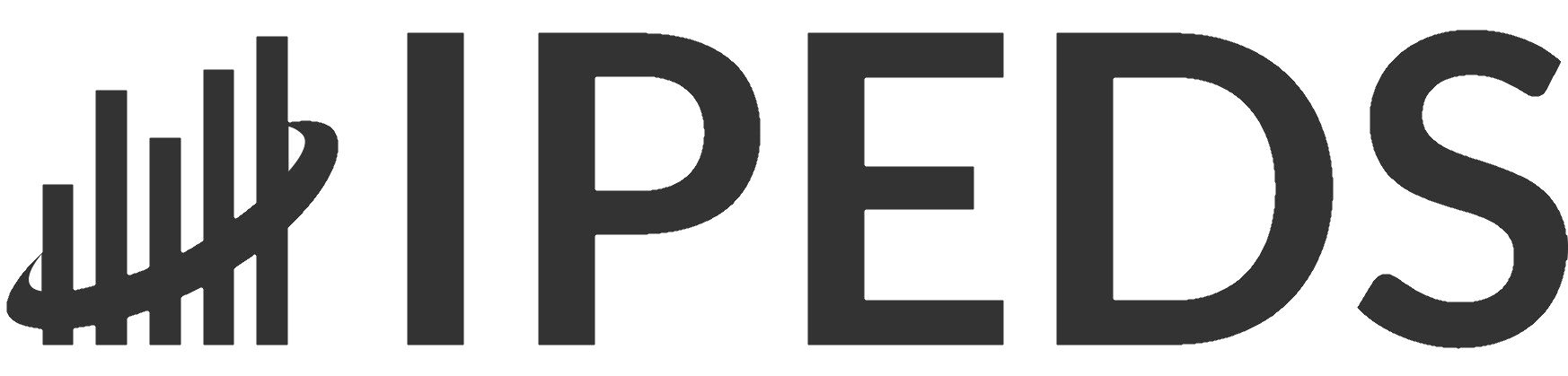
- Logo
- Established: 1992
- Parent organization: National Center for Education Statistics of the Institute of Education Sciences within the United States Department of Education
- Website: nces.ed.gov/ipeds

The Integrated Postsecondary Education Data System (IPEDS) is a system of interrelated surveys conducted annually by the National Center for Education Statistics (NCES), a part of the Institute for Education Sciences within the United States Department of Education. It was created in 1992 and began collecting data in 1993.

IPEDS consists of twelve interrelated survey components that are collected over three collection periods (fall, winter, and spring) each year as described in the Data Collection and Dissemination Cycle. The completion of all IPEDS surveys is mandatory for all institutions that participate in, or are applicants for participation in, any federal financial assistance program authorized by Title IV of the Higher Education Act of 1965, as amended.

== Data collected ==
IPEDS collects data on postsecondary education in the United States in the following areas: institutional characteristics, institutional prices, admissions, enrollment, student financial aid, degrees and certificates conferred, student persistence and success (retention rates, graduation rates, and outcome measures), institutional human resources, fiscal resources, and academic libraries.

=== Institutional characteristics ===
Institutional characteristics data are the foundation of the entire IPEDS system. These include basic institutional contact information, tuition and fees, room and board charges, control or affiliation, type of calendar system, levels of awards offered, types of programs, and admissions requirements.

=== Institutional prices ===
IPEDS collects institutional pricing data from institutions for full-time, first-time degree/certificate-seeking undergraduate students. This includes tuition and fee data as well as information on the estimated student budgets for students based on living situations (on-campus or off-campus).

=== Admissions ===
Basic information is collected from institutions that do not have an open-admissions policy on the undergraduate selection process for first-time, degree/certificate-seeking students. This includes information about admissions considerations, admissions yields, and SAT and ACT test scores.

=== Enrollment ===
Because enrollment patterns differ greatly among the various types of postsecondary institutions, there is a need for both different measures of enrollment and several indicators of access. In IPEDS, the following enrollment-related data are collected:

- Fall enrollment — Fall enrollment is the traditional measure of student access to higher education. Fall enrollment data can be looked at by race/ethnicity; gender; enrollment status (part-time or full-time); and or level of study (undergraduate or graduate).
- Residence of first-time students — Data on the number of first-time freshmen by state of residence, along with data on the number who graduated from high school the previous year, serve to monitor the flow of students across state lines and calculate college-going rates by state. These data are collected in even-numbered years.
- Age data — The age distribution of enrolled students offers insight into the relationship between the changing demographics of college-going cohorts and enrollment in different types of postsecondary institutions. They also permit detailed projections of enrollment by institutional type and by age. Because a student's dependency status is strongly related to age, the data can be used to provide estimates of the number of independent and dependent students attending postsecondary institutions. These data are collected in odd-numbered years.
- Unduplicated 12-month head count — Enrollment figures based on the unduplicated head count of students enrolled over a 12-month period is particularly valuable for institutions that use non-traditional calendar systems and offer short-term programs. Because this enrollment measure encompasses an entire year, it provides a more complete picture of the number of students these schools serve.
- Instructional activity — Data on instructional activity is measured in total credit and/or contact hours delivered by institutions during a 12-month period.
- Total entering class — Data on the number of incoming students (students enrolling for the first time in a postsecondary institution versus students transferring in from another postsecondary institution) at an institution. This measure permits the calculation of the graduation rate cohort as a proportion of the total entering student body.

=== Student financial aid ===
IPEDS collects data on the number of full-time, first-time degree/certificate-seeking undergraduate students who receive different types of student financial aid, including grants and loans, from different sources at each institution. IPEDS also collects data to show the average dollar amount of aid received by these students. Finally, as a result of the Higher Education Act (1965), as amended, IPEDS collects data to calculate the average net price at each institution for the following two groups: (1) full-time, first-time degree/certificate-seeking undergraduate students who receive grant and scholarship aid; and (2) full-time, first-time degree/certificate-seeking undergraduate students who receive Title IV federal student aid.

=== Degrees and certificates conferred (completions) ===
IPEDS collects data on the number of students who complete a postsecondary education program by type of program and level of award (certificate or degree). Type of program is categorized according to the Classification of Instructional Programs (CIP), a detailed coding system for postsecondary instructional programs. These data provide information on the number and location of completers by field. Business and industry, the military, and other groups that need to recruit individuals with particular skills use these data extensively. The data also help satisfy the mandate in the Carl D. Perkins Vocational and Technical Education Act for information on completions in postsecondary career and technical education programs.

=== Student persistence and success ===
IPEDS collects two types of data to help track postsecondary student progress and success.

- First–Year Retention Rates — The first-year retention rate measures the percentage of first-year students who had persisted in or completed their educational program a year later. These data have been collected since 2003.
- Graduation Rates — Graduation rate data provide information on institutional productivity and help institutions comply with reporting requirements of the Student Right-to-Know Act.
- Outcome Measures - Starting with the 2015-16 collection, IPEDS collects information on the number of awards conferred and the enrollment status of four degree/certificate-seeking undergraduate student cohorts: 1) Full-time, first-time, 2) Part-time, first-time, 3) Full-time, non-first-time, and 4) Part-time, non-first-time. The reported data are for two points in time: 6-years and 8-years after a cohort enters an institution.

=== Institutional resources ===
IPEDS collects institutional data on human resources and finances.

- Human resources — Human resources data measure the number and type of staff supporting postsecondary education. Because staffing patterns vary greatly across postsecondary institutions, IPEDS measures human resources in three ways:
  - Employees by assigned position — These data classify all employees by full- or part-time status, faculty status, and occupational activity.
  - Salaries — These data include the number of full-time instructional faculty by rank, gender, and length of contract/teaching period; total salary outlay; and fringe benefits.
  - Staff — These data include demographic and occupational characteristics for staff at institutions.
- Finances — Finance data includes institutional revenues by source, expenditures by category, and assets and liabilities. This information provides context for understanding the cost of providing postsecondary education. It is used to calculate the contribution of postsecondary education to the gross national product. IPEDS collects finance data conforming to the accounting standards that govern public and private institutions. Generally, private institutions use standards established by the Financial Accounting Standards Board (FASB) and public institutions use standards established by the Governmental Accounting Standards Board (GASB).

=== Academic Libraries ===
Information on collection access, expenditures, and services provided by libraries at degree-granting institutions. Data collected through the IPEDS system replaces the previous U.S. Census and NCES Academic Libraries Survey, which collected data from institutions every other even-number year and was not mandatory. In March 2024, the NCES announced that it would be retiring the Academic Libraries survey after the 2024-2025 data collection period.

== College Navigator ==
College Navigator is a "free consumer information tool designed to help students, parents, high school counselors, and others get information about over 7,500 postsecondary institutions in the United States - such as programs offered, retention and graduation rates, prices, aid available, degrees awarded, campus safety, and accreditation." Most of the data comes from IPEDS, although other data sources within the Department of Education are also used. The website went live in September 2007 as a replacement for College Opportunities On-line (COOL) and was named in a December issue of Money magazine that year as "the best first screen" for researching colleges.

== Controversy surrounding "unit record" data reporting ==
In March 2005, the U.S. Department of Education released a study about the feasibility of a student unit record system within IPEDS. This Unit Record proposal met with immediate and vocal opposition from congressional leaders as well as colleges and universities. The Department of Education argued that the development of a national student unit record tracking system, with appropriate privacy safeguards, which collects, analyzes and uses longitudinal student progression data was a vital tool for accountability and policy-making. This sparked an immediate reaction regarding the implications of what this means for institutions of higher education. Unit record reporting, as originally conceived, would require institutions that report to IPEDS to upload not summary data but rather to upload files that contain individual student records. These files would contain a wide range of information on the student but would, most importantly, include the student's Social Security Number. Concerns were raised that attending even one course would mean you are added to a federal database for the rest of your life. In a report issued in March 2006 by the Department of Education, Social Security Number was specifically excluded from the Unit Record upload data. It has been suggested that SSN will still be collected but it will be done so by a third-party before it is uploaded to the IPEDS Unit Record Database.

== References and notes ==
=== Footnotes ===
1. "Report from Secretary of Education's Commission on the Future of Higher Education" (PDF). June 22, 2006.
2. Lederman, Doug (June 27, 2006). "A Stinging First Draft". Archived from the original (HTTP) on February 19, 2007.
3. "Feasibility of a Student Unit Record System Within the Integrated Postsecondary Education Data System" (HTTP). March 21, 2005.
4. "A Test of Leadership, charting the future of U.S. Higher education" (PDF). September 1, 2006.
5. Lederman, Doug (June 27, 2006). "A Test of Leadership, charting the future of U.S. Higher education". Archived from the original (PDF) on February 7, 2007.
6. "Changes to IPEDS Data Collection, 2007-08". Archived from the original (HTTP) on February 22, 2007.
7. Lederman, Doug (February 19, 2007). "Huge IPEDS Lives". Archived from the original (HTTP) on February 22, 2007.
