= List of United States Supreme Court cases, volume 600 =

The United States Supreme Court is the court of last resort in the United States, so its decisions reflect the final, binding interpretations of federal law and the United States Constitution. The court issued several opinions in June 2023, the final month of the 2022 term. It published nine of them in Volume 600 of the United States Reports.

At the time these cases were decided, the Supreme Court's lead editor of its opinions was Rebecca Anne Womeldorf, the reporter of decisions.

Case name	Docket no.	Date decided
Moore v. Harper	600 U.S. 1	June 27, 2023
The Federal Elections Clause does not vest exclusive and independent authority in state legislatures to set the rules regarding federal elections, so a state supreme court may review that state's congressional districting plans for compliance with state law.
Counterman v. Colorado	600 U.S. 66	June 27, 2023
In criminal cases about true threats, the First Amendment requires a state to prove that the defendant had some subjective understanding of the statements' threatening nature, and the defendant must have said the threat at least recklessly.
Mallory v. Norfolk Southern Railway Co.	600 U.S. 122	June 27, 2023
A Pennsylvania law requiring out-of-state companies that register to do business in Pennsylvania to agree to appear in Pennsylvania courts is consistent with Due Process.
Students for Fair Admissions, Inc. v. President and Fellows of Harvard College	600 U.S. 181	June 29, 2023
Harvard's admissions program violates the Equal Protection Clause of the Fourteenth Amendment.
Abitron Austria GmbH v. Hetronic International, Inc.	600 U.S. 412	June 29, 2023
The Lanham Act does not apply to foreign conduct.
Groff v. DeJoy	600 U.S. 447	June 29, 2023
Title VII requires an employer that denies a religious accommodation to show that the burden of granting an accommodation would result in substantial increased costs in relation to the conduct of its particular business.
Biden v. Nebraska	600 U.S. 477	June 30, 2023
(1) At least Missouri has standing to challenge the Secretary’s program. (2) The HEROES Act allows the Secretary to "waive or modify" existing statutory or regulatory provisions applicable to financial assistance programs under the Education Act, but does not allow the Secretary to rewrite that statute to the extent of canceling $430 billion of student loan principal.
Department of Education v. Brown	600 U.S. 551	June 30, 2023
Case vacated because the student loan members lacked standing.
303 Creative LLC v. Elenis	600 U.S. 570	June 30, 2023
The First Amendment prohibits Colorado from forcing a website designer to create expressive designs speaking messages with which the designer disagrees.

== See also ==
- List of United States Supreme Court cases by the Roberts Court
- 2022 term opinions of the Supreme Court of the United States
