= Tracy Alloway (journalist) =

Financial journalist and podcaster

Tracy Alloway is an American financial journalist and podcaster at Bloomberg News, based in New York as of 2022.

== Education ==
Alloway earned a B.Sc. in International Relations from the London School of Economics. She also earned a postgraduate degree in periodical journalism from the University of Westminster.

== Career ==
From 2008 to 2015, she worked for the Financial Times. She covered capital markets and served as deputy editor of FT Alphaville.

Shortly thereafter, Alloway started working for Bloomberg Television. She became an Executive Editor for Bloomberg News and the co-host of "Bloomberg Daybreak Middle East." She also co-hosts the weekly Odd Lots podcast with Joe Weisenthal. In 2022, she and Weisenthal were nominated for a Webby Award for best business podcast.

Outside of journalism, Alloway is a frequent moderator for financial industry events such as the Milken Institute Conference.
