= Higher Education Act of 1965 =

U.S. law establishing a student loan program

- Other short titles: Higher Education Facilities Act Amendment; National Defense Education Act Amendment
- Long title: An Act to strengthen the educational resources of our colleges and universities and to provide financial assistance for students in post-secondary and higher education.
- Acronyms (colloquial): HEA, NTCA
- Nicknames: National Teachers Corps Act
- Enacted by: the 89th United States Congress
- Effective: November

Codification
- Titles amended: 20 U.S.C.: Education
- U.S.C. sections created: 20 U.S.C. ch. 28 § 1001 et seq.

Legislative history
- Introduced in the House as H.R. 9567 by Edith Green (D–OR); Passed the House on August 26, 1965 (368-22); Passed the Senate on September 2, 1965 (79-3); Reported by the joint conference committee on October 20, 1965; agreed to by the House on October 20, 1965 (313-63) and by the Senate on October 20, 1965 (passed); Signed into law by President Lyndon B. Johnson on November 8, 1965

Major amendments
- Education Amendments of 1972; No Child Left Behind Act

The Higher Education Act of 1965 (HEA) (Pub. L. 89–329) was legislation signed into United States law on November 8, 1965, as part of President Lyndon Johnson's Great Society domestic agenda. Johnson chose Texas State University (then called "Southwest Texas State College"), his alma mater, as the signing site. The law was intended "to strengthen the educational resources of our colleges and universities and to provide financial assistance for students in postsecondary and higher education". It increased federal money given to universities, created scholarships, gave low-interest loans for students, and established a National Teachers Corps. The "financial assistance for students" is covered in Title IV of the HEA.

The Higher Education Act of 1965 was reauthorized in 1968, 1972, 1976, 1980, 1986, 1992, 1998, and 2008. The current authorization for the programs in the Higher Education Act expired at the end of 2013 but has been extended through various temporary measures since 2014. Before each re-authorization, Congress amends additional programs, changes the language and policies of existing programs, or makes other changes.

== 1965 Act ==
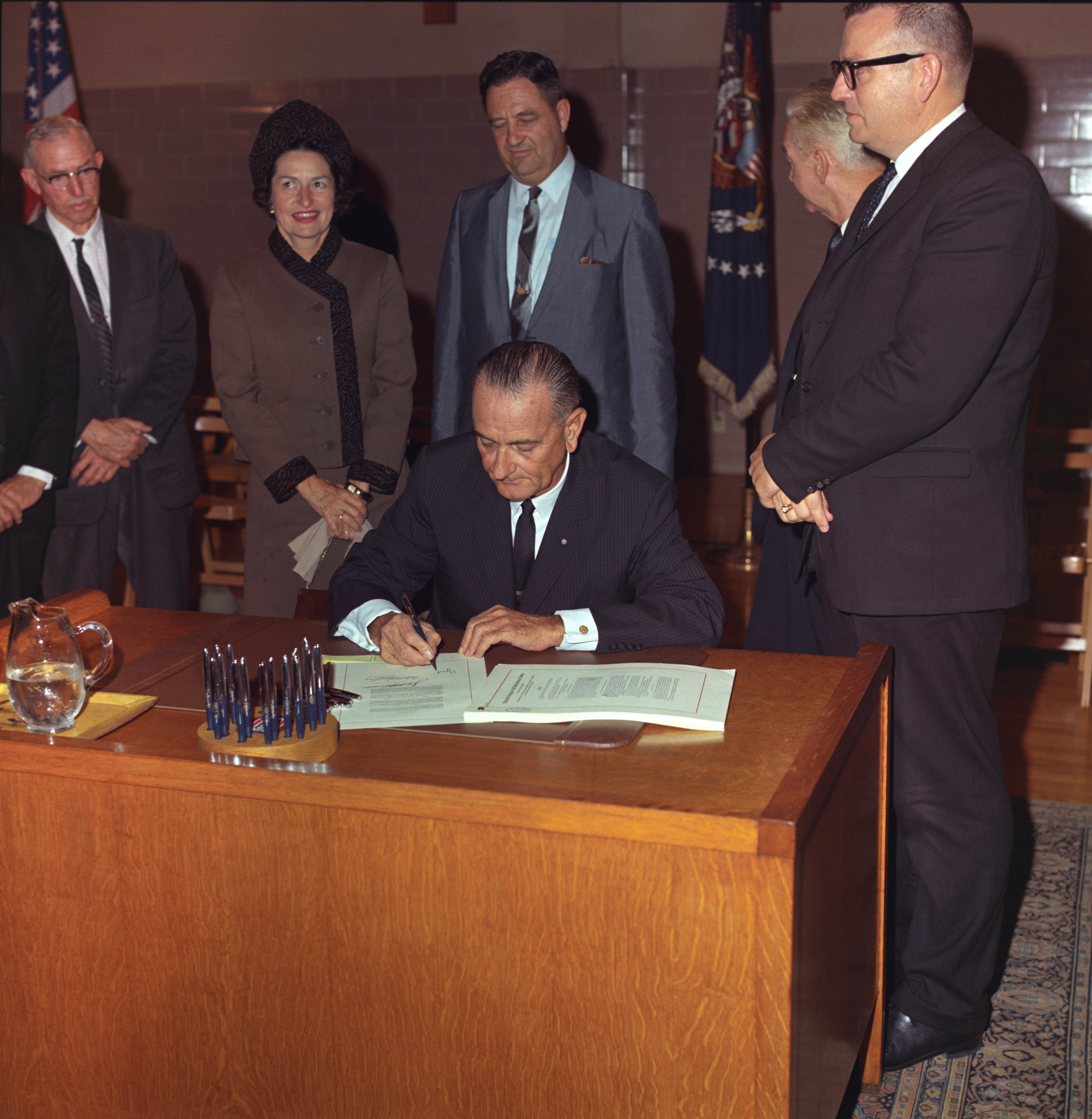
President Lyndon B. Johnson signs the Higher Education Act at Southwest Texas State College. Lady Bird Johnson, Cong. J. J. Pickle, Jesse C. Kellam, and James H. McCrocklin look on.

In January 1965, President Lyndon Johnson told Congress that higher education was "no longer a luxury but a necessity" and urged Congress to enact legislation to expand access to college. Representative Edith Green of Oregon introduced H. R. 3220 as a bill to "strengthen the educational resources of our colleges and universities and to provide financial assistance for students in postsecondary education." Senator Wayne Morse of Oregon introduced the Senate version of the bill, S. 600. The bills sought to create an advisory council to review teacher training programs and to create a National Teacher Corps, which would recruit teachers to serve in low-income areas and train teachers through internships. Other provisions of the bills included financial aid, scholarships, work-study, and library enhancements. Throughout 1965 numerous hearings were held by Special Subcommittee on Education, and the Education Subcommittee of the Senate Committee on Labor and Public Welfare held numerous hearings. Based on the recommendations of university administrators, educators, and student aid officers, a new bill was introduced: H. R. 9567. It was passed by the House of Representatives on August 26, and the Senate passed the bill on September 2.

In signing the Higher Education Act of 1965 into law, President Johnson described the act, along with the Elementary and Secondary Education Act, as "keystones of the great, fabulous 89th Congress" that would spread "the roots of change and reform" throughout the nation.

=== Scope ===
The act contains eight sections or titles.

- Title I, General Provisions
- Title II, Teacher Quality Enhancement
- Title III, Strengthening Institutions
- Title IV, Student Assistance
- Title V, Developing Institutions
- Title VI, International Education Programs
- Title VII, Graduate and Postsecondary Improvement Programs
- Title VIII, Additional Programs.

== Amendments to the HEA ==
=== Changes in 1976 ===
Before 1976 student loans were dischargeable in bankruptcy like other unsecured loans. An undue hardship test was introduced for federally insured loans under five years.

=== Changes in 1986 ===
The 1986 amendments to the HEA included the creation of a funding stream for Historically Black Colleges and Universities (HBCUs). The proposal enjoyed bipartisan support.

=== Changes in 1992 ===
The 1992 reauthorization of the HEA was praised for its bipartisanship, developed in a Democratic congress and signed by a Republican president. The legislation significantly expanded the student loan program by creating an "unsubsidized" version of the loans available to any student, regardless of whether the financial aid formulas determined that they had unmet need. In the 1992 presidential campaign universal access to loans had become a policy supported by both major candidates.

The idea of having loans be made directly by the federal government, instead of guaranteeing and subsidizing bank loans, gained currency in the Bush administration as the result of budget reforms. Some George H. W. Bush advisors supported the switch as a way of saving money and simplifying the program, but the White House ultimately opposed the approach. At the insistence of some in Congress, the 1992 reauthorization included a pilot program of direct lending, planting the seed for a full-blown Direct Student Loan Program proposed in Clinton's first year as president.

A third change to the loan program was to pilot an income-contingent repayment option. Several versions of the concept had been proposed by both Democrats and Republicans in Congress. Meanwhile, in the presidential campaign, candidate Bill Clinton included it as an element of his National Service campaign, and President Bush indicated support for the concept when he endorsed universal access to loans. The 1992 reauthorization included a small pilot of income-contingent repayment as part of the direct loan program, which was expanded along with that program the following year.

The problem of consumer abuses by for-profit colleges was a major topic in hearings leading to the bipartisan 1992 reauthorization bill. In the wake of skyrocketing student loan defaults, an 18-month investigation by the Senate Permanent Subcommittee on Investigations had concluded in 1991 that the student loan program, "particularly as it relates to proprietary schools, is riddled with fraud, waste and abuse." The HEA bill adopted a number of reforms that contributed to the closure of hundreds of schools. The changes included cutting off aid at schools with high default rates, prohibiting the use of commission-based sales agents in recruiting and limiting HEA funding to no more than 85 percent of any for-profit college's revenue. The 1992 bill also included a system of triggers for state-level reviews of colleges by State Postsecondary Review Entities or SPREs. At the urging of nonprofit colleges the SPRE provisions were repealed in 1995 by the newly elected Republican Congress.

=== Changes in 1998 ===
The Gaining Early Awareness and Readiness for Undergraduate Programs (GEAR UP) was first authorized under the Higher Education Amendments of 1998. Also in the amendments of 1998 is the Aid Elimination Provision, which prevents students with drug charges from receiving federal aid for colleges and universities. This is where question 31 on the FAFSA forms originates. The question asks whether the student has ever been convicted of a drug crime while receiving federal financial aid. This statutory provision was upheld by the United States Court of Appeals for the Eighth Circuit in the face of a constitutional challenge by the ACLU in the case of Students for Sensible Drug Policy v. Spellings.

The amendments also included a provision [HEA Section 487(a)(23)] requiring universities to make a good faith effort to encourage voter registration of students on their campuses. This requirement applies only to institutions located in states that require voter registration prior to election day and do not allow registration on the day of the election. Institutions receive registration forms from the state after requesting them at least 120 days prior to the voter registration deadline and must make them "widely available" to students.

=== Changes in 2003 ===
In 2003, much of the Higher Education Act was set to expire. As a result, a number of minority groups united in asking for certain changes. Calling themselves the Alliance for Equity in Higher Education, this group was made up of "the American Indian Higher Education Consortium, the Hispanic Association of Colleges and Universities, and the National Association for Equal Opportunity in Higher Education, an advocacy group for historically black colleges and universities, [and they] presented their joint recommendations for the reauthorization of the Higher Education Act." The Alliance aimed to help minority students enter fields where they seemed to be underrepresented and to give incentives to minorities to enter these programs. These incentives included more lenience on loan collection and full government funding for minority education. The Alliance also called for the government to create funding for students in graduate programs of universities serving the minority population.

Even though the Alliance's request to change the Higher Education Act was heard, significant parts were denied. In 2003, the request for increasing the amount offered in a Pell Grant, to better cover a student's expenses, was denied by the Senate. Still, other issues were corrected. There was a section passed by the House that did allow more funds to go to institutions in order to keep them current, and a grace period for colleges asking for more loans was eliminated. So, if more funding were needed, minority institutions would not have to wait.

Also in 2003, the Higher Education Relief Opportunities For Students Act (sometimes referred to as the HEROES Act) was passed, enabling the Secretary of Education to grant waivers or relief to recipients of federal student loan programs under the HEA "in connection with a war or other military operation or national emergency."

=== 2007 College Cost Reduction and Access Act ===
A budget reconciliation bill signed into law in September 2007 included significant changes to HEA financial aid programs. In addition to increasing the maximum Pell Grant award and reducing interest rates on subsidized student loans, a new "income-based repayment" option capped loan repayment at 15% of an individual's discretionary income, while a Public Service Loan Forgiveness promised that some borrowers could forgive student loan balances after ten years of repayment. The student aid formula's income protection allowance was increased, and the interest rate on new student loans was changed to fixed rates from the variable rate. The new law also took action to address problematic practices in the lending industry. Most CCRA provisions took effect on October 1, 2007.

=== 2008 reauthorization ===
With the changes proposed in 2003, the actual Higher Education Act was not reauthorized. Instead, many of its sections were renewed with little radical change. Numerous extensions have followed, with the most recent extension lasting through August 15, 2008. The Senate passed a HEA reauthorization bill in July 2007, as did the House of Representatives in February 2008.

On August 14, 2008, the Higher Education Opportunity Act (Public Law 110-315) (HEOA) was enacted. It reauthorized the amended version of the Higher Education Act of 1965. This act made major changes in student loan discharges for disabled people. Previously, to qualify for a discharge, a disabled person could have no income. This has been changed to a no "substantial gainful activity" test, which is the same standard used by the Social Security Administration in determining eligibility for Social Security Disability Insurance (SSDI). The changes took effect on July 1, 2010.

Also included in the 2008 revision of the HEOA were provisions requiring action by U.S. colleges and universities to combat illegal file-sharing. Following significant lobbying by the Motion Picture Association of America (MPAA) and Recording Industry Association of America (RIAA), the additions to the HEOA of 2008 included requirements that all U.S. colleges and universities (1) release an annual disclosure to students regarding copyright laws and associated campus policies, (2) a written plan, submitted to the Department of Education, to combat copyright abuse using one or more technology-based deterrents, and (3) an offer to students of alternatives to illegal downloading. Significant controversy surrounded the inclusion of anti-P2P legislation into HEOA of 2008, resulting in a letter from a number of leaders in higher education.

The law, for the first time, also required post-secondary institutions to be more transparent about costs and required the nearly 7,000 post-secondary institutions that receive federal financial aid funds (Title IV) to post net price calculators on their websites as well as security and copyright policies by October 29, 2011.

As defined in HEOA, the net price calculator's purpose is "to help current and prospective students, families, and other consumers estimate the individual net price of an institution of higher education for a student. The [net price] calculator shall be developed in a manner that enables current and prospective students, families, and consumers to determine an estimate of a current or prospective student's individual net price at a particular institution."

The law defines "estimated net price" as the difference between an institution's average total Price of Attendance (the sum of tuition and fees, room and board, books and supplies, and other expenses, including personal expenses and transportation for first-time, full-time undergraduate students who receive aid) and the institution's median need- and merit-based grant aid awarded.

Elise Miller, program director for the United States Department of Education's Integrated Postsecondary Education Data System (IPEDS), stated the idea behind the requirement: "We just want to break down the myth of sticker price and get beyond it. This is to give students some indication that they will not [necessarily] be paying that full price."

The template was developed based on the suggestions of the IPEDS' Technical Review Panel (TRP), which met on January 27–28, 2009, and included 58 individuals representing federal and state governments, post-secondary institutions from all sectors, and association representatives, and template contractors. Mary Sapp, assistant vice president for planning and institutional research at the University of Miami, served as the panel's chair. She described the mandate's goal as "to provide prospective and current undergraduate students with some insight into the difference between an institution's sticker price and the price they will end up paying."

The TRP faced the difficult challenge of creating one tool that could be used by a wide variety of institutions – from small, for-profit career schools to major research universities – while balancing simplicity for users.

To meet the requirement, post-secondary institutions may choose either a basic template developed by the U.S. Department of Education or an alternate net price calculator that offers at least the minimum elements required by law.

As part of its cost-transparency measures, the HEOA of 2008 also requires on the College Navigator Web site a report giving the average institutional net price of attendance for first-time, full-time students who receive financial aid. This also forms the basis for transparency lists; a report on the College Navigator Web site the institutional net price of attendance for Title IV aid recipients by income categories; and for the U.S. Department of Education to develop multi-year tuition and required-fees calculator for undergraduate programs for the College Navigator Web site.

The HEOA has been criticized for establishing statutory pricing of federal student loans based on political considerations rather than pricing based on risk.

The 2008 reauthorization of the Higher Education Act also maintained the requirement that universities must make an effort to register students to vote. A 2013 Dear Colleague letter from the U.S. Department of Education stated that universities "must make the voter registration forms widely available to [their] students and distribute the forms individually to [their] degree or certificate program students who are physically in attendance at [their] institution. Distribution by regular or electronic mail is permitted."

==== HEA Title VI International Programs ====
During this reform period of 2008, Title VI of the HEA was reviewed. Title VI provides federal funds to 129 international studies and foreign language centers at universities nationwide. Title VI supplies grants for international language studies, business and international education programs as well as international policy.

=== Extension of HEA ===
After being reauthorized in 2008, the Higher Education Act was set to expire in 2013, but was re-extended to allow Congress time to work on the next reauthorization. Further extensions followed, without major amendments to the HEA. In December 2017, House Republicans announced that they had finalized an overhaul of the act, authored primarily by Representative Virginia Foxx of (R - N.C.), the chairwoman of the House Committee on Education and the Workforce. The new bill is called the Promoting Real Opportunity, Success and Prosperity through Education Reform (PROSPER) Act. The act aims to simplify the federal financial aid process and expand federal work-study programs. It would also repeal two Obama-era programs - "gainful employment" and "borrower defense" - aimed at preventing financial exploitation of undergraduates, as well as bar their readoption.

According to Committee spokesman Michael Woeste, "the reforms within the PROSPER Act are necessary to provide students with a high-quality education and fix a system that has not been serving their needs."

Some concerns have been raised by advocacy groups about how the PROSPER Act would affect LGBTQ students. According to the Human Rights Campaign, "The PROSPER Act contains several provisions that would allow for the use of religion to justify otherwise prohibited discrimination that could negatively impact LGBTQ students."

Additionally, the PROSPER Act includes a weaker version of the provision requiring universities to increase student voter registration, a requirement present in the Higher Education Act since 1998. Critics worry that this change will lead to lower youth turnout in elections, as voter turnout is already historically lowest among young voters.

== Gainful employment rule ==
The original 1965 version of the HEA, because of for-profit school abuses in the GI Bill program, provided support only to public or nonprofit colleges and universities, and the financial aid was restricted to academic degree programs. For vocational training, including at accredited for-profit schools, Congress in 1965 established a separate student loan program for education "designed to fit individuals for useful employment in recognized occupations." Subsequent amendments merged the vocational program into the HEA, allowing for-profit schools access to HEA financial aid funds, but only for programs that prepare students for "gainful employment in a recognized occupation." An Obama administration effort to use student loan and graduate earnings data to clarify the scope of eligibility, particularly at problematic for-profit colleges, is commonly referred to as the "gainful employment rule."

=== 2011 rule ===
In the spring of 2009, the Obama administration announced that it was considering strengthening various consumer protections in higher education, including establishing guidelines about programs eligible under the gainful employment provision of the HEA. After conferring with stakeholders, the department proposed allowing schools to retain access to financial aid as long as programs met either a loan repayment metric or a measure of student loan debt compared to earnings of graduates. The agency published its rule in June 2011, estimating that five percent of for-profit programs and one percent of nonprofit and public programs would lose eligibility.

The for-profit industry filed a lawsuit to stop the implementation of the gainful employment rule. In 2012, a federal district court affirmed the department's authority to adopt the rule but struck down the rule itself because the agency had not provided a justification for the level at which it had set the loan repayment measure.

The 2011 rule was proposed at 75 Federal Register 43615 (2010) and finalized at Notice of Final Rulemaking: 76 Federal Register 34385 (2011).

=== 2014 rule ===
The department adopted revised regulations in May 2014 that deleted the repayment rate measure identified by the judge and made other adjustments. The result was a rule that affected more programs and colleges since programs that failed the debt burden metrics could no longer retain eligibility by having an adequate repayment rate.

Multiple for-profit college associations filed lawsuits to stop the revised version of the rule. On the other side of the issue, a group of state attorneys general sought court action to force the implementation the rule after the Trump administration delayed its enforcement. The Trump administration later introduced a further complication by misusing gainful employment data for an unrelated purpose, leading the Social Security Administration to stop providing earnings data to the Department of Education.

The 2014 rule was proposed at 79 Federal Register 16425 (2014) and finalized at Notice of Final Rulemaking: 79 Federal Register 64889 (2014).

=== 2019 rescission ===
In August 2018, Secretary of Education Betsy DeVos proposed to rescind the gainful employment regulations, a step completed in July 2019. The repeal was effective on July 1, 2020, but allowed colleges to voluntarily cease compliance immediately. The administration's 2019 repeal of the gainful employment rule has been challenged by 18 state attorneys general, led by Xavier Becerra of California and the American Federation of Teachers. Those two lawsuits allege various procedural defects in the way the regulation was repealed.

The 2019 rule was proposed at 83 Federal Register 40167 (2018) and finalized at Notice of Final Rulemaking: 84 Federal Register 31382 (2019).

=== 2023 rule expansion to "financial value transparency" ===
The department began the process of re-instituting a gainful employment rule in December 2021, holding a set of negotiating sessions with stakeholders in 2022. In early 2023 the department published a notice seeking input on metrics that could be used to identify low-financial-value programs in postsecondary education (beyond those vocational programs subject to gainful employment). In fall 2023 the department adopted a new gainful employment rule, along with broader financial transparency requirements applicable to all colleges.

== Use in cancelling student loan debt ==
The Higher Education Act has been proposed as a potential way to cancel student loan debt. According to a paper by the Legal Services Center at Harvard Law School and commissioned by Senator Elizabeth Warren in September 2020, the Secretary of Education may be able to cancel student loan debt. Following Biden v. Nebraska (2023), President Joe Biden suggested using the act.

On July 14, 2023, President Biden announced he would use the Higher Education Act to relieve $39 billion in student loan debt, which he says is "legally sound" while warning "it's going to take longer".

== See also ==
- Public service law in the United States

== Resources ==
- Federal Policy: Higher Education Opportunity Act. Center for Law and Social Policy.
- Center for Postsecondary and Economic Success. Center for Law and Social Policy.
- Title 20, Chapter 28, Subchapter IV, United States Code 1070, et seq.
- Fountain, Joselynn H. (April 10, 2023). "The Higher Education Act (HEA): A Primer" (Report). Congressional Research Service. Archived from the original on March 1, 2024.
- Smole, David P.; Kuenzi, Jeffrey J.; Naughton, Blake Alan; Skinner, Rebecca R. (September 8, 2008). "The Higher Education Opportunity Act: Reauthorization of the Higher Education Act" (Report). Congressional Research Service.
