= Joe Weisenthal =

American journalist

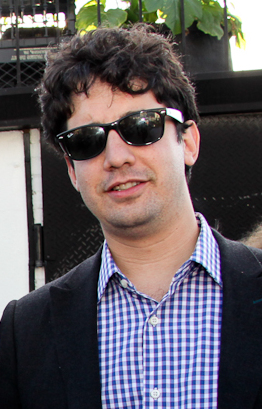
- Weisenthal in 2012
- Born: Joseph Weisenthal; September 2, 1980 (age 45); Detroit, Michigan, U.S.
- Education: University of Texas, Austin (BA)
- Occupations: Journalist, presenter, podcaster
- Years active: 2004–present

Joseph Weisenthal (born September 2, 1980) is an American journalist, television presenter and podcaster. He is the executive editor of news for Bloomberg's digital brands, the co-anchor of What’d You Miss? on Bloomberg Television, and co-host of the Odd Lots podcast with Tracy Alloway on Bloomberg Podcasts.

== Early life and education ==
Joseph Weisenthal was born on September 2, 1980, in Detroit, Michigan. He is Jewish but has stated although he does not understand Hebrew, he goes to shul to “disconnect from the broader world and experience something timeless and ancient”. He graduated from the University of Texas at Austin in 2002 with a degree in political science.

== Career ==
In 2004, Weisenthal co-created the markets blog TheStalwart.com with his friend Vincent Fernando, which published discussions about current stocks, finance, business, and economics. Weisenthal wrote for the technology news blog Techdirt as an analyst between March 2006 and September 2007.

In October 2008, Weisenthal joined Business Insider as lead financial blogger covering markets, finance, and economics, and in February 2013, became executive editor of the website.

In October 2014, Weisenthal left Business Insider and joined Bloomberg L.P. the same month as managing editor of Bloomberg's online markets and finance coverage, running the newly created Bloomberg Markets website.

In June 2015, Weisenthal joined the newly created markets show What'd You Miss?, which he co-anchored with Alix Steel on Bloomberg Television. The show is named after one of Weisenthal's most often-used expressions, "What'd I miss?", which he tweets almost every morning. As of July 2021, the show is co-anchored by Weisenthal, Caroline Hyde, and Romaine Bostick.

Since 2015, Weisenthal and Tracy Alloway, an executive editor for Bloomberg News based in Hong Kong, have co-hosted the business and finance podcast Odd Lots, which as of 2021 is released twice a week on Monday and Thursday, on Bloomberg Podcasts and other podcasting platforms.

In November 2016, Weisenthal became the executive editor of news for Bloomberg's digital brands.

=== Orality theory ===
Weisenthal claims that his Theory of Orality explains modern human behavior better than any other. He contrasts the plasticity of oral history, how it readily adapts traditional narratives to address the needs of the listeners directly, to the rigid structure of recorded history that facilitates abstraction and allows infinite layers of complexity to be added by later generations of readers. According to this theory the advent of social media is allowing the reinvention of simple, readily understandable narratives without the editorial intervention of scholarly moderation or journalistic objectivity that publishers of books and periodicals and audiovisual media have traditionally applied in order to secure the survival of those enterprises
