= Allison Engine Co. v. United States ex rel. Sanders =

- Supreme Court of the United States

Argued February 26, 2008 Decided June 9, 2008
- Full case name: Allison Engine Co., Inc., et al., v. United States ex rel. Roger L. Sanders and Roger L. Thacker
- Docket no.: 07-214
- Citations: 553 U.S. 662 (more) 128 S. Ct. 2123; 170 L. Ed. 2d 1030

Case history
- Prior: United States ex rel. Sanders v. Allison Engine Co., 471 F.3d 610 (6th Cir. 2006)
- Subsequent: Law amended by Congress in 2009 with the effect of reversing the decision

Holding
- Plaintiffs under the False Claims Act must demonstrate that the defendants intended to deceive the government, not simply that government money was used to pay the claim.

Court membership
- Chief Justice John Roberts Associate Justices John P. Stevens · Antonin Scalia; Anthony Kennedy · David Souter; Clarence Thomas · Ruth Bader Ginsburg; Stephen Breyer · Samuel Alito

Case opinion
- Majority: Alito, joined by unanimous

Laws applied
- False Claims Act, 31 U.S.C. § 3729
- Superseded by
- Fraud Enforcement and Recovery Act of 2009

Allison Engine Co. v. United States ex rel. Sanders, 553 U.S. 662 (2008), was a decision by the Supreme Court of the United States holding that plaintiffs under the False Claims Act must prove that the false claim was made with the specific intent of inducing the government to pay or approve payment of a false or fraudulent claim, rather than merely defrauding a contractor. Congress overruled this decision with the Fraud Enforcement and Recovery Act of 2009.

== Background ==
In 1985, Bath Iron Works and Ingalls Shipbuilding began construction on a new fleet of destroyers for the United States Navy. Allison Engine was subcontracted to build generator sets for these ships, and General Tool Company was hired by Allison to assemble the system. The terms of the contracts required that the work meet strict Navy specifications. Two former employees of General Tool, Roger L. Sanders and Roger L. Thacker, filed suit in the Southern District of Ohio under the False Claims Act, alleging that Allison, General Tool, and other subcontractors had knowingly submitted invoices to the shipyards for work which did not meet the Navy requirements, and that the contractors had issued false certificates of compliance with those specifications. Sanders and Thacker, as qui tam relators, would be entitled to a portion of the government's recovery from the contractors if they prevailed in the suit.

The False Claims Act provided:

(a) Any person who ... (2) knowingly makes, uses, or causes to be made or used, a false record or statement to get a false or fraudulent claim paid or approved by the Government ... is liable to the United States Government for a civil penalty of not less than $5,000 and not more than $10,000, plus 3 times the amount of damages which the Government sustains because of the act of that person.

— 31 U.S.C. § 3729, as in effect prior to 2009

At trial, the plaintiffs introduced as evidence the alleged false invoices, but did not provide evidence of false invoices from the shipyards to the Navy. The contractor defendants moved for judgment on the grounds that the plaintiffs had not introduced any evidence of any false claims made to the Federal government. The trial court, interpreting the language of the False Claims Act, agreed and entered judgment in favor of the defendants. On appeal, the Sixth Circuit Court of Appeals reversed the trial court, deciding that it was sufficient for the plaintiffs to prove that a false claim would be paid with government money, even if it was not paid directly by the government.

== Case ==
The Supreme Court granted certiorari to consider what the appropriate standard for cases under §3729(a)(2) of the False Claims Act should be, and to resolve a conflict among the circuit courts. The D.C. Circuit had already decided a similar case, United States ex rel. Totten v. Bombardier Corp., finding (contrary to the Sixth Circuit) that intent for the false claim to be paid by the government was an essential element of §3729(a)(2). In their briefs to the Supreme Court, the petitioners argued that a §3729(a)(2) action must include the element of presentment: that the false claim must be made directly to the government. The government, as respondent, argued by contrast that the words "paid or approved by the Government" in the statute should be read to include any payment made with government money, however indirectly.

Writing for a unanimous court, Justice Samuel Alito notes that, "[w]hile §3729(a)(1) requires a plaintiff to prove that the defendant "present[ed]" a false or fraudulent claim to the Government, the concept of presentment is not mentioned in §3729(a)(2)." He concludes:

What §3729(a)(2) demands is not proof that the defendant caused a false record or statement to be presented or submitted to the Government but that the defendant made a false record or statement for the purpose of getting "a false or fraudulent claim paid or approved by the Government." Therefore, a subcontractor violates §3729(a)(2) if the subcontractor submits a false statement to the prime contractor intending for the statement to be used by the prime contractor to get the Government to pay its claim. If a subcontractor or another defendant makes a false statement to a private entity and does not intend the Government to rely on that false statement as a condition of payment, the statement is not made with the purpose of inducing payment of a false claim "by the Government."

The Court also considered a conspiracy claim under §3729(a)(3), and concluded that the language of that clause was sufficiently similar to clause (a)(2) that the same principle should apply. The judgment of the Sixth Circuit was vacated and the case remanded for further consideration.

== Subsequent developments ==
The Fraud Enforcement and Recovery Act of 2009, Pub.L. 111-21, restates the False Claims Act, replacing §3729(a)(2) with a reading closer to that advocated by the government in Allison Engine:

[A]ny person who ... knowingly makes, uses, or causes to be made or used, a false record or statement material to a false or fraudulent claim ... is liable to the United States Government for a civil penalty of not less than $5,000 and not more than $10,000 ... plus 3 times the amount of damages which the Government sustains because of the act of that person.

This has the effect of reversing the Supreme Court's decision by eliminating the specific language on which Allison Engine was decided, and thereby cease "allowing subcontractors and non-governmental entities to escape responsibility for proven frauds".
