= Title 18 of the United States Code =

United States federal criminal code

Title 18 of the United States Code is the main criminal code of the federal government of the United States. The title deals with federal crimes and criminal procedure. In its coverage, Title 18 is similar to most U.S. state criminal codes, typically referred to by names such as penal code, criminal code, or crimes code. Typical of state criminal codes is the California Penal Code. Many U.S. state criminal codes, unlike the federal Title 18, are based on the Model Penal Code promulgated by the American Law Institute.

Title 18 consists of five parts. Four of these, Parts I through IV, concern crimes, criminal procedure, prisons and prisoners, and juvenile delinquency, respectively, and were included in the original title when it was enacted in 1948. The fifth part, concerning witness immunity, was not included in the original title but was added in 1970.

== Part I—Crimes ==
The odd-numbered chapters (i.e. chapters 1 through 117) were all included in the original Title 18. The other chapters were added at various times – see below for the complete date and citations for each chapter.

=== Chapters 1–10 ===
Chapters 1, 3, 5, 7, and 9 were all included in the original title as it was enacted by statute 62 Stat. 683.

Chapter 2 was added to Title 18 in July 1956 with the enactment of law 70 Stat. 538. Chapter 10 was added to Title 18 in May 1990 with the enactment of law 104 Stat. 201.

==== Chapter 1: General Provisions ====
- Section 1, previously classifying offenses as felonies and misdemeanors, was repealed per Public Law 98-473, title II, Section 218(a)(1), 98 Stat. 2027, as of October 12, 1984, effective November 1, 1987.
- Section 2, last amended in 1951, defines principal offenders.
- Section 3, last amended in 1994, defines and provides punishment for "accessories after the fact".
- Section 4, last amended in 1994, defines and provides punishment for "misprision of felony".
- Section 5, having not been amended since 1948, defines "United States".
- Section 6, having not been amended since 1948, defines "department" and "agency".
- Section 7, last amended in 2001, defines "special maritime and territorial jurisdiction of the United States".
- Section 8, having not been amended since 1948, defines "obligation or other security of the United States".
- Section 9, having not been amended since 1948, defines "vessel of the United States".
- Section 10, having not been amended since 1948, defines "interstate commerce" and "foreign commerce".
- Section 11, last amended in 1976 by 90 Stat. 2001, defines "foreign government".
- Section 12, last amended in 1990, defines "United States Postal Service".
- Section 13, last amended in 1996, deals with laws of states adopted for areas within federal jurisdiction.
- Section 14 has been repealed per Public Law 107-273, division B, title IV, section 4004(a), as of November 2, 2002. 116 Stat. 1812.
- Section 15, added in 1958 by 72 Stat. 1771, defines "obligation or other security of foreign government" as uncanceled stamps, whether or not they are demonetized.
- Section 16, added in 1984, defines "crime of violence", where subsection (b), the so-called 'residual' clause, was ruled unconstitutional in Sessions v. Dimaya (2018).
- Section 17, added in 1984 and last amended in 1986 by 100 Stat. 3599, deals with the insanity defense, defining it as "an affirmative defense to a prosecution under any Federal statute that, at the time of the commission of the acts constituting the offense, the defendant, as a result of a severe mental disease or defect, was unable to appreciate the nature and quality or the wrongfulness of his acts", that "mental disease or defect does not otherwise constitute a defense", and that "the defendant has the burden of proving the defense of insanity by clear and convincing evidence".
- Section 18, added in 1986 by 100 Stat. 3599 and last amended in 1988, defines "organization" as a person other than an individual.
- Section 19, added in 1987 by 101 Stat. 1279 and last amended in 1988, defines "petty offense" as "a Class B misdemeanor, a Class C misdemeanor, or an infraction, for which the maximum fine is no greater than the amount set forth for such an offense in section 3571(b)(6) or (7) in the case of an individual or section 3571(c)(6) or (7) in the case of an organization."
- Section 20, added in 1984 and last amended in 2009, defines "financial institution".
- Section 21, added in 1994, defines "stolen or counterfeit nature of property for certain crimes".
- As of 2026, there is no section 22.
- Section 23, added in 1994, defines "court of the United States".
- Section 24, added in 1996 and last amended in 2010, provides "definitions relating to Federal health care offense".
- Section 25, added in 2003, deals with the "use of minors in crimes of violence".
- Section 26, added in 2006 by 109 Stat. 177, defines seaports.
- Section 27, added in 2009, defines "mortgage lending business."

==== Chapter 2: Aircraft and Motor Vehicles ====
This chapter deals with offenses using or against aircraft and motor vehicles. It was inserted in 1956 by 70 Stat. 538.

- Section 31, last amended in 2000, contains definitions.
- Section 32, last amended in 2006, creates the "crime of destruction of aircraft or aircraft facilities".
- Section 33, last amended in 2006, prohibits "destruction of motor vehicles or motor vehicle facilities".
- Section 34, last amended in 1994, provides the "penalty when death results".
- Section 35, last amended in 1994, prohibits "imparting or conveying false information".
- Section 36, last amended in 1996, deals with drive-by shooting.
- Section 37, last amended in 1996, prohibits "violence at international airports".
- Section 38, added in 2000, deals with "fraud involving aircraft or space vehicle parts in interstate or foreign commerce".
- Section 39, added in 2005, prohibits unauthorized traffic signal preemption transmitters.
- Section 39A, added in 2012, prohibits aiming a laser pointer at or in the flight path of an aircraft.
- Section 39B, added in 2018, prohibits flying a drone in an unsafe manner around an aircraft.
- Section 40, last amended in 2008, requires commercial vehicles to stop for inspections.
- Section 40A, added in 2018, prohibits operating an unmanned aircraft and knowingly or recklessly interfering with a wildfire suppression, or law enforcement or emergency response efforts related to a wildfire suppression, provides for penalties and definitions, and exempts certain operating purposes of unmanned aircraft.

==== Chapter 3: Animals, Birds, Fish, and Plants ====
This chapter deals with offenses against wildlife.

- Section 41 prohibits hunting, fishing, trapping, or disturbance or injury to birds, fish, or wildlife in any protected areas of the United States, and provides a penalty of a fine under this title or imprisonment up to six months, or both.
- Section 42, last amended in 2018, is titled "importation or shipment of injurious mammals, birds, fish (including mollusks and crustacea), amphibia, and reptiles; permits, specimens for museums; regulations". It prohibits the import of harmful or invasive species, including Urva auropunctata, bats of the genus Pteropus, the zebra mussel, and the brown tree snake, and authorizes the Secretary of the Interior to bar other harmful species. The section also provides exemptions.
- Section 43 is titled "Force, violence, and threats involving animal enterprises" and prohibits intentional disruption or harm to "animal enterprises" through interstate or foreign commerce, and provides various penalties.
- Section 44 has been repealed per Public Law 97-79, Section 9(b)(2), as of November 16, 1981. 95 Stat. 1079.
- Section 45 has been repealed per Public Law 101-647, title XII, Section 1206(a), as of November 29, 1990. 104 Stat. 4832.
- Section 46 has been repealed per Public Law 116–260, div. O, title X, § 1002(1), as of December 27, 2020, 134 Stat. 2155.
- Section 47 prohibits the use of an aircraft or motor vehicle to hunt any "wild unbranded horse, mare, colt, or burro running at large on any of the public land or ranges" and prohibits the pollution of any watering hole on any of the public land or ranges for the purpose of hunting any of the named animals, and provides for a penalty of a fine under this title, or imprisonment up to six months, or both, for each offense.
- Section 48 , lasted amended in 2019, prohibits animal crushing, the creation of animal crush videos, and the distribution of animal crush videos. It has extraterritorial reach and comes with a penalty of a fine, up to 7 years in prison, or both.
- Section 49 provides for penalties regarding animal fighting ventures and increased penalties for allowing minors to see animal fighting ventures.

==== Chapter 5: Arson ====
This chapter deals with arson. It has only one section that was last amended in 2001.

- Section 81, defining "arson", "attempted arson", or "conspiracy to commit arson", and providing a penalty of imprisonment for up to 25 years, the greater of the fine under this title or the cost of repairing or replacing any property that is damaged or destroyed, or both. It also provides that if the building is a dwelling or if the life of any person is placed in jeopardy, the penalty shall be a fine under this title, imprisonment for "any term of years or for life", or both.

==== Chapter 7: Assault ====
This chapter deals with assault.

- Section 111 prohibits "assaulting, resisting, or impeding" officers, employees and Law Enforcement Explorers of the United States while engaged in or on account of the performance of official duties, and the assault or intimidation of "any person who formerly served" as an officers or employees of the United States "on account of the performance of official duties during such person's term of service". The section provides for a penalty for simple assault of a fine, imprisonment for up to one year, or both, and a penalty in all other cases of a fine, imprisonment for up to eight years, or both. An enhanced penalty of a fine or imprisonment for up to 20 years is provided for if a "deadly or dangerous weapon" is used or if bodily injury is inflicted.
- Section 112 is "protection of foreign officials, official guests, and internationally protected persons". It prohibits assaulting or causing harm to a "foreign official, official guest, or internationally protected person" or "any other violent attack upon the person or liberty of such person", and provides a penalty of a fine, imprisonment of up to three years, or both, and an enhanced penalty of a fine or imprisonment of up to 10 years, or both, if a deadly or dangerous weapon" is used or if bodily injury is inflicted.
- Section 112 also prohibits "[i]ntimidating, coercing, threatening, or harassing a foreign official or an official guest, or obstructing a foreign official in the performance of his duties", or an attempt to do so, and additionally prohibits two or more people congregating within 100 feet of any building being used "for diplomatic, consular, or residential purposes" by foreign officials or international organization, "with intent to violate any other provision of this section", and provides for a fine, imprisonment up to six months, or both. The section also provides that "Nothing contained in this section shall be construed or applied so as to abridge the exercise of rights" guaranteed under the First Amendment to the United States Constitution.
- Section 113 provides punishments for assault within the special maritime and territorial jurisdiction of the United States: for assault with intent to commit murder, imprisonment for not more than 20 years; for assault with intent to commit any felony except murder or a felony under chapter 109A, by a fine under this title or imprisonment for not more than ten years, or both; for assault with a dangerous weapon, with intent to do bodily harm, and without just cause or excuse, by a fine under this title or imprisonment for not more than ten years, or both; for assault by striking, beating, or wounding, by a fine under this title or imprisonment for not more than six months, or both; simple assault, by a fine under this title or imprisonment for not more than six months, or both, or if the victim of the assault is an individual who has not attained the age of 16 years, by fine under this title or imprisonment for not more than 1 year, or both; assault resulting in serious bodily injury, by a fine under this title or imprisonment for not more than ten years, or both; assault resulting in substantial bodily injury to an individual who has not attained the age of 16 years, by fine under this title or imprisonment for not more than 5 years, or both.
  - Section 113 also defines "substantial bodily injury" as bodily injury involving a temporary but substantial disfigurement, or a temporary but substantial loss or impairment of the function of any bodily member, organ, or mental faculty, and defines "serious bodily injury" as the meaning given that term in section 1365 of this title.
- Section 114, makes it a crime within the special maritime and territorial jurisdiction of the United States to, with intent to torture (as defined in section 2340), and provides that whoever shall "maim, disfigure, cuts, bites, or slits the nose, ear, or lip, or cuts out or disables the tongue, or puts out or destroys an eye, or cuts off or disables a limb or any member of another person; or whoever, within the special maritime and territorial jurisdiction of the United States, and with like intent, throws or pours upon another person, any scalding water, corrosive acid, or caustic substance shall be fined under this title or imprisoned not more than 20 years, or both."
- Section 115: Influencing, impeding, or retaliating against a federal official by threatening or injuring a family member
- Section 116: Female genital mutilation to minors
- Section 117: Domestic assault by an habitual offender
- Assault on a federal process server is treated under Chapter 73 of Title 18, Section 1501.
- Section 118: Section 118, added in 2007, prohibits the knowing and willful obstruction, resistance to, or interference with a Federal law enforcement agent engaged, within the United States or the special maritime territorial jurisdiction of the United States, in the performance of the protective functions authorized under section 37 of the State Department Basic Authorities Act of 1956 (22 U.S.C. 2709) or section 103 of the Diplomatic Security Act (22 U.S.C. 4802), and for a penalty of a fine under the title or a period of imprisonment not exceeding 1 year, or both.
- Section 119: Section 119, added in 2008, prohibits knowingly making restricted personal information about a covered person, or a member of the immediate family of that covered person, publicly available with the intent to threaten, intimidate, or incite the commission of a crime of violence against that covered person, or a member of the immediate family of that covered person or with the intent and knowledge that the restricted personal information will be used to threaten, intimidate, or facilitate the commission of a crime of violence against that covered person, or a member of the immediate family of that covered person, for a fine under the title or five years of imprisonment, and for definitions of a restricted person.

==== Chapter 9: Bankruptcy ====
This chapter deals with bankruptcy offenses committed by debtors.

- Section 151: Section 151 provides a definition for "debtor."
- Section 152: Section 152 sets forth nine offenses involving concealment of assets, false oaths and claims, and bribery, and provides for penalties.
- Section 153: Section 153 provides that a person who has access to property or documents by being a trustee, custodian, marshal, attorney, or other officer of the court or as an agent, employee, or other person engaged by the office to perform an estate-related service who knowingly and fraudulently appropriates to the person's own use, embezzles, spends, or transfers any property or secretes or destroys any document belonging to the estate of a debtor, is subject to penalty.
- Section 154: Section 154 provides that a custodian, trustee, marshal, or other officer of the court who knowingly purchases in part or whole any property of an estate where they are involved in a bankruptcy case involving such estate, or refuses to permit a reasonable opportunity for the inspection by the parties in interest and their affairs if the court directs them to do so, or inspection by the United States Trustee of the documents in question, is subject to a fine and shall forfeit their office.
- Section 155: Section 155 provides that a party in interest of any bankruptcy case who knowingly and fraudulently enters into any express or implied agreement with any other party in order to fix their fees or rate of compensation, or to perform any service relating to the assets of the estate, is subject to a fine and a penalty.
- Section 156: Section 156 defines "bankruptcy petition preparer" and "document for filing" and provides that a preparer whose case is dismissed because of knowing violation of title 11 or the Federal Rules of Bankruptcy Procedure is liable to fine or imprisonment.
- Section 157: Section 157 makes it an offense for any person to devise or intend to devise a scheme or artifice to defraud, and with intent to execute or conceal such scheme or artifice, file a bankruptcy petition or fraudulent involuntary petition under title 11, any document under title 11, or at any time before such petition is filed, make a false or fraudulent representation, claim, or promise concerning or relating to a proceeding under title 11. It further provides for penalties.
- Section 158: Section 158, titled "Designation of United States attorneys and agents of the Federal Bureau of Investigation to address abusive reaffirmations of debt and materially fraudulent statements in bankruptcy schedules" and added in 2005, concerns the designation of United States Attorneys (US Attorneys) and FBI agents to address fraudulent bankruptcy statements. It provides that the Attorney General shall designate the US Attorneys and FBI Agents to enforce violations of section 152 or 157 and provides that the US Attorneys so designated also have responsibility for carrying out their duties under section 3057. Lastly, it mandates that the courts refer any case involving or containing, or suspected to involve or contain, a materially fraudulent statement in a bankruptcy schedule to the US Attorney or FBI agents.

==== Chapter 10: Biological weapons ====
This chapter deals with biological weapons.

- Section 175: Section 175 provides that there is extraterritorial Federal jurisdiction for a violation of the section and that it is an offense to knowingly develop, produce, stockpile, transfer, acquire, retain, or possess any biological agent, toxin, or delivery system for use as a weapon, assists a foreign state or any organization to do so, or attempt, threaten, or conspire others to do the same, and that it is an offense to possesses any biological agent, toxin, or delivery system of a type or in a quantity that, under the circumstances, is not reasonably justified by a prophylactic, protective, bona fide research, or other peaceful purpose. It lastly sets forth a supplemental definition for "for use as a weapon."
- Section 175a: Section 175a provides that the Attorney General or a sufficient subordinate may request assistance from the Secretary of Defense for an emergency situation involving a biological weapon of mass destruction.
- Section 175b: Section 175b provides that a restricted person cannot ship, transport, or possess in or affecting interstate or foreign commerce any biological agent or toxin or receive any biological agent or toxin that has been shipped or transported in interstate or foreign commerce, and sets forth penalties and official exemptions. It further penalizes the act of transferring a biological agent or toxin to a person not legally registered to possess it and penalizes the unregistered possession of such agents. Lastly, it sets forth definitions.
- Section 175c: Section 175c provides that it is unlawful, without the permission or authority of the Secretary of Health and Human Services, to knowingly produce, engineer, synthesize, acquire, transfer directly or indirectly, receive, possess, import, export, or use, or possess and threaten to use variola virus and what situations would lead to the acts committed falling under Federal jurisdiction. It additionally provides that whoever violates or attempts or conspires to violate the section is subject to a fine of not more than $2,000,000 and a period of imprisonment not less than 25 years, or life, and that whoever, while violating the section, uses, attempts or conspires to use, or possesses and threatens to use variola virus is subject to an equivalent fine but a period of imprisonment of not less than 30 years, or for life, but that if any person dies as a result of the act, the penalty shall be $2,000,000 and imprisonment for life. Lastly, it sets forth the definition of "variola virus."
- Section 176: Section 176 relates to forfeiture of biological weapons that are prohibited under section 185 or of a type or in a quantity that under the circumstances has no apparent justification for prophylactic, protective, or other peaceful purposes, and provides that in emergency situations such seizure and destruction may be made on probable cause alone, without a warrant. Otherwise, any property seized will be forfeited after a hearing, where the Government must prove by preponderance of the evidence, and the Attorney General has the power to destroy or dispose of any items forfeited. There is an affirmative defense against forfeiture for any biological agent of a type or quantity if it can be shown that the biological agent is for a prophylactic, protective, or other peaceful purpose and the biological agent is of a type and quantity reasonable for that purpose.
- Section 177: Section 177 provides that the United States can obtain an injunction against any conduct forbidden under section 175, or any conspiracy to engage in forbidden conduct, or the development, production, stockpiling, transferring, acquisition, retention, or possession, or the attempted development, production, stockpiling, transferring, acquisition, retention, or possession of any biological agent, toxin, or delivery system of a type or in a quantity that under the circumstances has no apparent justification for prophylactic, protective, or other peaceful purposes. It is an affirmative defense to an injunction under the development, production, or attempt to develop or produce a biological agent or type with no apparent justification if the conduct sought to be enjoined is for a prophylactic, protective, or other peaceful purpose and such biological agent, toxin, or delivery system is of a type and quantity reasonable for that purpose.
- Section 178: Section 178 defines "biological agent", "toxin", "delivery system", "vector", and "national of the United States".

=== Chapters 11–19 ===
==== Chapter 11: Bribery, graft, and conflicts of interest ====
This chapter deals with bribery, graft, and conflicts of interest.

==== Chapter 11A: Child support ====
This chapter, added in 1994 by 102 Stat. 521 deals with child support. It has only one section.

- Section 228, likewise added in 1994, provides offenses relating to failure to pay or attempts to evade child support, rebuttable presumptions, penalties (increased for recidivists), mandatory restitution, venue of trial, and supplementary definitions.

==== Chapter 11B: Chemical weapons ====
This chapter, added in 1998 by 112 Stat. 2681-866, related to offenses involving chemical weapons.

- § 229. Prohibited activities
- § 229A. Penalties
- § 229B. Criminal forfeitures; destruction of weapons
- § 229C. Individual self-defense devices
- § 229D. Injunctions
- § 229E. Requests for military assistance to enforce prohibition in certain emergencies
- § 229F. Definitions

==== Chapter 12: Civil disorders ====
This chapter, added in 1968 by 82 Stat. 90, related to offenses involving civil disorder.

- § 231. Civil disorders
- § 232. Definitions
- § 233. Preemption

==== Chapter 13: Civil rights ====
This chapter deals with offenses involving civil rights.

- § 241. Conspiracy against rights
- § 242. Deprivation of rights under color of law
- § 243. Exclusion of jurors on account of race or color
- § 244. Discrimination against person wearing uniform of armed forces
- § 245. Federally protected activities
- § 246. Deprivation of relief benefits
- § 247. Damage to religious property; obstruction of persons in the free exercise of religious beliefs
- § 248. Freedom of access to clinic entrances
- § 249. Hate crime acts
- § 250. Penalties for civil rights offenses involving sexual misconduct

==== Chapter 14: [Repealed]. ====
Chapter 14 was repealed in 2002. It related to the former (Panama) Canal Zone.

==== Chapter 15: Claims and services in matters affecting government ====
- Sections 285–292 apply
- Sections 281–284 and 293 have been repealed

==== Chapter 17: Coins and currency ====
This chapter deals with offenses involving coins and currency.

==== Chapter 17A: Common carrier under the influence of alcohol or drugs ====
This chapter, added in 1986 by 100 Stat. 3207-59, deals with operating a "common carrier" under the influence of alcohol or drugs.

- § 341. Definitions
- § 342. Operation of a common carrier under the influence of alcohol or drugs
- § 343. Presumptions

==== Chapter 18: Congressional, Cabinet, and Supreme Court assassination, kidnapping, and assault ====
This chapter, added in 1971 by 84 Stat. 1891, deals with Congressional, Cabinet, and Supreme Court assassination, kidnapping, and assault. It has only one section.

- § 351. Congressional, Cabinet, and Supreme Court assassination, kidnapping, and assault; penalties

==== Chapter 19: Conspiracy ====
- Section 371 defines conspiracy against the United States.
- § 372. Conspiracy to impede or injure officer
- § 373. Solicitation to commit a crime of violence

=== Chapters 21–29 ===
==== Chapter 21: Contempts ====
- § 401. Power of court
- § 402. Contempts constituting crimes
- § 403. Protection of the privacy of child victims and child witnesses

==== Chapter 23: Contracts ====
- § 431. Contracts by Member of Congress
- § 432. Officer or employee contracting with Member of Congress
- § 433. Exemptions with respect to certain contracts
- [§ 434. Repealed. Pub. L. 87–849, § 2, Oct. 23, 1962, 76 Stat. 1126]
- § 435. Contracts in excess of specific appropriation
- § 436. Convict labor contracts
- [§ 437. Repealed. Pub. L. 104–178, § 1(a), Aug. 6, 1996, 110 Stat. 1565]
- [§§ 438, 439. Repealed. Pub. L. 106–568, title VIII, § 812(c)(2), Dec. 27, 2000, 114 Stat. 2917]
- § 440. Mail contracts
- § 441. Postal supply contracts
- § 442. Government Publishing Office
- § 443. War contracts

==== Chapter 26: Criminal street gangs ====
This chapter, added in 1994 by 108 Stat. 2034, deals with criminal street gangs. It has only one section.

- § 521. Criminal street gangs

==== Chapter 27: Customs ====
§ 541. Entry of goods falsely classified § 542. Entry of goods by means of false statements § 543. Entry of goods for less than legal duty § 544. Relanding of goods § 545. Smuggling goods into the United States § 546. Smuggling goods into foreign countries § 547. Depositing goods in buildings on boundaries § 548. Removing or repacking goods in warehouses § 549. Removing goods from customs custody; breaking seals § 550. False claim for refund of duties § 551. Concealing or destroying invoices or other papers § 552. Officers aiding importation of obscene or treasonous books and articles § 553. Importation or exportation of stolen motor vehicles, off-highway mobile equipment, vessels, or aircraft § 554. Smuggling goods from the United States § 555. Border tunnels and passages

==== Chapter 29: Elections and political activities ====
§611. Voting by aliens (a) It shall be unlawful for any alien to vote in any election held solely or in part for the purpose of electing a candidate for the office of President, Vice President, Presidential elector, Member of the Senate, Member of the House of Representatives, Delegate from the District of Columbia, or Resident Commissioner, unless—

(1) the election is held partly for some other purpose;

(2) aliens are authorized to vote for such other purpose under a State constitution or statute or a local ordinance; and

(3) voting for such other purpose is conducted independently of voting for a candidate for such Federal offices, in such a manner that an alien has the opportunity to vote for such other purpose, but not an opportunity to vote for a candidate for any one or more of such Federal offices.

(b) Any person who violates this section shall be fined under this title, imprisoned not more than one year, or both.

(c) Subsection (a) does not apply to an alien if—

(1) each natural parent of the alien (or, in the case of an adopted alien, each adoptive parent of the alien) is or was a citizen (whether by birth or naturalization);

(2) the alien permanently resided in the United States prior to attaining the age of 16; and

(3) the alien reasonably believed at the time of voting in violation of such subsection that he or she was a citizen of the United States.

(Added Pub. L. 104–208, div. C, title II, §216(a), Sept. 30, 1996, 110 Stat. 3009–572; amended Pub. L. 106–395, title II, §201(d)(1), Oct. 30, 2000, 114 Stat. 1635.)

=== Chapters 31–41 ===
==== Chapter 31: Embezzlement and theft ====
(TBD)

==== Chapter 33: Emblems, insignia, and names ====
- Section 700 deals with flag desecration. It has been ruled unconstitutional as of Texas v. Johnson.
- Section 701 prohibits the unauthorized manufacture, sale, or possession of official badges, identification cards or other insignia.
- Section 702 prohibits the unauthorized wear of the uniforms of the armed forces and Public Health Service, or of imitations.
- Section 703 likewise prohibits the unauthorized wear of uniforms of foreign friendly nations with "intent to deceive or mislead".
- Section 704 prohibits the unauthorized wear, manufacture, or sale of awards and decorations of the United States military, with special provisions increasing the penalty if the award is the Medal of Honor.

§ 705. Badge or medal of veterans' organizations § 706. Red Cross § 706a. Geneva distinctive emblems [§ 707. Repealed. Pub. L. 116–260, div. O, title X, § 1002(3), Dec. 27, 2020, 134 Stat. 2155] [§ 708. Repealed. Pub. L. 116–260, div. O, title X, § 1002(4), Dec. 27, 2020, 134 Stat. 2155] § 709. False advertising or misuse of names to indicate Federal agency § 710. Cremation urns for military use [§ 711. Repealed. Pub. L. 116–260, div. O, title X, § 1002(5), Dec. 27, 2020, 134 Stat. 2155] [§ 711a. Repealed. Pub. L. 116–260, div. O, title X, § 1002(6), Dec. 27, 2020, 134 Stat. 2155] § 712. Misuse of names, words, emblems, or insignia § 713. Use of likenesses of the great seal of the United States, the seals of the President and Vice President, the seal of the United States Senate, the seal of the United States House of Representatives, and the seal of the United States Congress [§ 714. Repealed. Pub. L. 97–258, § 2(d)(1)(B), Sept. 13, 1982, 96 Stat. 1058] [§ 715. Repealed. Pub. L. 116–260, div. O, title X, § 1002(7), Dec. 27, 2020, 134 Stat. 2155] § 716. Public employee insignia and uniform

==== Chapter 35: Escape and rescue ====
§ 751. Prisoners in custody of institution or officer § 752. Instigating or assisting escape § 753. Rescue to prevent execution [§ 754. Repealed. Pub. L. 103–322, title XXXIII, § 330004(5), Sept. 13, 1994, 108 Stat. 2141] § 755. Officer permitting escape § 756. Internee of belligerent nation § 757. Prisoners of war or enemy aliens § 758. High speed flight from immigration checkpoint

==== Chapter 37: Espionage and censorship ====
- Section 791 § 791. Repealed. Pub. L. 87–369, § 1, Oct. 4, 1961, 75 Stat. 795
- Section 792 prohibits harboring or concealing persons
- Section 793 targets gathering, transmitting or losing defense information
- Section 794 targets gathering or delivering defense information to aid foreign government(s)
- Section 795 targets photographing and sketching defense installations
- Section 796 targets use of aircraft for photographing defense installations
- Section 797 targets publication and sale of photographs of defense installations
- Section 798 targets disclosure of classified information
- Section 798A defines temporary extension of section 794
- Section 799 targets violation of regulations of National Aeronautics and Space Administration

==== Chapter 39: Explosives and other dangerous articles ====
§ 831. Prohibited transactions involving nuclear materials § 832. Participation in nuclear and weapons of mass destruction threats to the United States [§§ 833 to 835. Repealed. Pub. L. 96–129, title II, § 216(b), Nov. 30, 1979, 93 Stat. 1015] § 836. Transportation of fireworks into State prohibiting sale or use [§ 837. Repealed. Pub. L. 91–452, title XI, § 1106(b)(1), Oct. 15, 1970, 84 Stat. 960]

==== Chapter 40: Importation, manufacture, distribution, and storage of explosive materials ====
This chapter, added in 1970 by 84 Stat. 952 deals with importing, manufacturing, distributing, and storage of explosive materials. § 841. Definitions § 842. Unlawful acts § 843. Licenses and user permits § 844. Penalties § 845. Exceptions; relief from disabilities § 846. Additional powers of the Attorney General § 847. Rules and regulations § 848. Effect on State law

==== Chapter 41: Extortion and threats (including threats against the President of the United States) ====
§ 871. Threats against President and successors to the Presidency § 872. Extortion by officers or employees of the United States § 873. Blackmail § 874. Kickbacks from public works employees § 875. Interstate communications § 876. Mailing threatening communications § 877. Mailing threatening communications from foreign country § 878. Threats and extortion against foreign officials, official guests, or internationally protected persons § 879. Threats against former Presidents and certain other persons § 880. Receiving the proceeds of extortion

=== Chapters 42–51 ===
==== Chapter 42: Extortionate credit transactions ====
This chapter, added in 1968 by 82 Stat. 159, deals with extortionate credit transactions. § 891. Definitions and rules of construction § 892. Making extortionate extensions of credit § 893. Financing extortionate extensions of credit § 894. Collection of extensions of credit by extortionate means [§ 895. Repealed. Pub. L. 91–452, title II, § 223(a), Oct. 15, 1970, 84 Stat. 929] § 896. Effect on State laws

==== Chapter 43: False personation ====
§ 911. Citizen of the United States § 912. Officer or employee of the United States § 913. Impersonator making arrest or search § 914. Creditors of the United States § 915. Foreign diplomats, consuls or officers § 916. 4–H Club members or agents § 917. Red Cross members or agents

==== Chapter 44: Firearms ====
This chapter, added in 1968 by 82 Stat. 226, deals with firearms.

- Section 921 defines various terms as used in §§ 921–931, also found in the definition of aggravated felony.
- Section 922 prohibiting certain behavior involving firearms (e.g. 18 U.S. Code § 922(g), declaring it unlawful for a prohibited person to ship, transport, or possess a firearm)
- Section 923
- Section 924
- Section 925
- Section 926
- Section 927
- Section 928
- Section 929
- Section 930
- Section 931

==== Chapter 46: Forfeiture (§§ 981–987) ====
This chapter, added in 1986 by 100 Stat. 3207-35, concerns the civil and criminal seizure of property and assets used in crimes. § 981. Civil forfeiture § 982. Criminal forfeiture § 983. General rules for civil forfeiture proceedings § 984. Civil forfeiture of fungible property § 985. Civil forfeiture of real property § 986. Subpoenas for bank records § 987. Anti-terrorist forfeiture protection

==== Chapter 47: Fraud and false statements (§§ 1001–1040) ====
- Section 1030: addresses computer fraud, defining a protected computer via the Computer Fraud and Abuse Act.

==== Chapter 49: Fugitives from justice ====
§ 1071. Concealing person from arrest § 1072. Concealing escaped prisoner § 1073. Flight to avoid prosecution or giving testimony § 1074. Flight to avoid prosecution for damaging or destroying any building or other real or personal property

==== Chapter 50: Gambling ====
Added in 1949. § 1081. Definitions § 1082. Gambling ships § 1083. Transportation between shore and ship; penalties § 1084. Transmission of wagering information; penalties

==== Chapter 50A: Genocide ====
Added in 1988. § 1091. Genocide § 1092. Exclusive remedies § 1093. Definitions

==== Chapter 51: Homicide ====
§ 1111. Murder § 1112. Manslaughter § 1113. Attempt to commit murder or manslaughter § 1114. Protection of officers and employees of the United States § 1115. Misconduct or neglect of ship officers § 1116. Murder or manslaughter of foreign officials, official guests, or internationally protected persons § 1117. Conspiracy to murder § 1118. Murder by a Federal prisoner § 1119. Foreign murder of United States nationals § 1120. Murder by escaped prisoners § 1121. Killing persons aiding Federal investigations or State correctional officers § 1122. Protection against the human immunodeficiency virus

=== Chapters 53–63 ===
==== Chapter 53: Indians ====
§ 1151. Indian country defined § 1152. Laws governing § 1153. Offenses committed within Indian country § 1154. Intoxicants dispensed in Indian country § 1155. Intoxicants dispensed on school site § 1156. Intoxicants possessed unlawfully [§ 1157. Repealed. Pub. L. 85–86, July 10, 1957, 71 Stat. 277] § 1158. Counterfeiting Indian Arts and Crafts Board trade mark § 1159. Misrepresentation of Indian produced goods and products § 1160. Property damaged in committing offense § 1161. Application of Indian liquor laws § 1162. State jurisdiction over offenses committed by or against Indians in the Indian country § 1163. Embezzlement and theft from Indian tribal organizations § 1164. Destroying boundary and warning signs § 1165. Hunting, trapping, or fishing on Indian land § 1166. Gambling in Indian country § 1167. Theft from gaming establishments on Indian lands § 1168. Theft by officers or employees of gaming establishments on Indian lands § 1169. Reporting of child abuse § 1170. Illegal trafficking in Native American human remains and cultural items

==== Chapter 55: Kidnapping ====
§ 1201. Kidnapping § 1202. Ransom money § 1203. Hostage taking § 1204. International parental kidnapping

==== Chapter 57: Labor ====
§ 1231. Transportation of strikebreakers [§ 1232. Repealed. Aug. 10, 1956, ch. 1041, § 53, 70A Stat. 641]

==== Chapter 59: Liquor traffic ====
§ 1261. Enforcement, regulations, and scope § 1262. Transportation into State prohibiting sale § 1263. Marks and labels on packages § 1264. Delivery to consignee § 1265. C.O.D. shipments prohibited

==== Chapter 61: Lotteries ====
§ 1301. Importing or transporting lottery tickets § 1302. Mailing lottery tickets or related matter § 1303. Postmaster or employee as lottery agent. Section catchline was not amended to conform to change made in the text by Pub. L. 91–375.

§ 1304. Broadcasting lottery information § 1305. Fishing contests § 1306. Participation by financial institutions § 1307. Exceptions relating to certain advertisements and other information and to State-conducted lotteries § 1308. Limitation of applicability

==== Chapter 63: Mail fraud ====
- Section 1341 targets frauds and swindles.
- Section 1342 applies to fictitious name or address.
- Section 1343 applies to fraud by wire, radio, or television.
- Section 1344 applies to bank fraud.
- Section 1345 provides for injunctions against fraud.
- Section 1346 is a single sentence: "For the purposes of this chapter, the term 'scheme or artifice to defraud' includes a scheme or artifice to deprive another of the intangible right of honest services."
- Section 1347 targets health care fraud.
- Section 1348 targets securities fraud.
- Section 1349 is a single sentence: "Any person who attempts or conspires to commit any offense under this chapter shall be subject to the same penalties as those prescribed for the offense, the commission of which was the object of the attempt or conspiracy."
- Section 1350 was introduced by the Sarbanes-Oxley Act and applies to failure of corporate officers to certify financial reports.

=== Chapters 65 – 75 ===
==== Chapter 65: Malicious mischief ====
§ 1361. Government property or contracts § 1362. Communication lines, stations or systems § 1363. Buildings or property within special maritime and territorial jurisdiction § 1364. Interference with foreign commerce by violence § 1365. Tampering with consumer products § 1366. Destruction of an energy facility § 1367. Interference with the operation of a satellite § 1368. Harming animals used in law enforcement § 1369. Destruction of veterans' memorials

==== Chapter 67: Military and navy ====
§ 1381. Enticing desertion and harboring deserters § 1382. Entering military, naval, or Coast Guard property [§ 1383. Repealed. Pub. L. 94–412, title V, § 501(e), Sept. 14, 1976, 90 Stat. 1258] § 1384. Prostitution near military and naval establishments § 1385. Use of Army, Navy, Marine Corps, Air Force, and Space Force as posse comitatus § 1386. Keys and keyways used in security applications by the Department of Defense § 1387. Demonstrations at cemeteries under the control of the National Cemetery Administration and at Arlington National Cemetery § 1388. Prohibition on disruptions of funerals of members or former members of the Armed Forces § 1389. Prohibition on attacks on United States servicemen on account of service

==== Chapter 68: [Repealed] ====
Repealed in 1970, relating to narcotics and heroin.

==== Chapter 69: Nationality and citizenship ====
§ 1421. Accounts of court officers § 1422. Fees in naturalization proceedings § 1423. Misuse of evidence of citizenship or naturalization § 1424. Personation or misuse of papers in naturalization proceedings § 1425. Procurement of citizenship or naturalization unlawfully § 1426. Reproduction of naturalization or citizenship papers § 1427. Sale of naturalization or citizenship papers § 1428. Surrender of canceled naturalization certificate § 1429. Penalties for neglect or refusal to answer subpena

==== Chapter 71: Obscenity ====
§ 1460. Possession with intent to sell, and sale, of obscene matter on Federal property § 1461. Mailing obscene or crime-inciting matter § 1462. Importation or transportation of obscene matters § 1463. Mailing indecent matter on wrappers or envelopes § 1464. Broadcasting obscene language § 1465. Production and transportation of obscene matters for sale or distribution § 1466. Engaging in the business of selling or transferring obscene matter § 1466A. Obscene visual representations of the sexual abuse of children § 1467. Criminal forfeiture § 1468. Distributing obscene material by cable or subscription television § 1469. Presumptions § 1470. Transfer of obscene material to minors

==== Chapter 73: Obstruction of justice ====
§ 1501. Assault on process server § 1502. Resistance to extradition agent § 1503. Influencing or injuring officer or juror generally § 1504. Influencing juror by writing § 1505. Obstruction of proceedings before departments, agencies, and committees § 1506. Theft or alteration of record or process; false bail § 1507. Picketing or parading § 1508. Recording, listening to, or observing proceedings of grand or petit juries while deliberating or voting § 1509. Obstruction of court orders § 1510. Obstruction of criminal investigations § 1511. Obstruction of State or local law enforcement § 1512. Tampering with a witness, victim, or an informant § 1513. Retaliating against a witness, victim, or an informant § 1514. Civil action to restrain harassment of a victim or witness § 1514A. Civil action to protect against retaliation in fraud cases § 1515. Definitions for certain provisions; general provision § 1516. Obstruction of Federal audit § 1517. Obstructing examination of financial institution § 1518. Obstruction of criminal investigations of health care offenses § 1519. Destruction, alteration, or falsification of records in Federal investigations and bankruptcy § 1520. Destruction of corporate audit records § 1521. Retaliating against a Federal judge or Federal law enforcement officer by false claim or slander of title

==== Chapter 74: Partial-birth abortions ====
This chapter, added in 2003 by 117 Stat. 1206, deals with partial-birth abortions. It has only one section.

§ 1531. Partial-birth abortions prohibited

==== Chapter 75: Passports and visas ====
§ 1541. Issuance without authority § 1542. False statement in application and use of passport § 1543. Forgery or false use of passport § 1544. Misuse of passport § 1545. Safe conduct violation § 1546. Fraud and misuse of visas, permits, and other documents § 1547. Alternative imprisonment maximum for certain offenses

=== Chapters 77–87 ===
==== Chapter 77: Peonage, slavery, and trafficking in persons ====
§ 1581. Peonage; obstructing enforcement § 1582. Vessels for slave trade § 1583. Enticement into slavery § 1584. Sale into involuntary servitude § 1585. Seizure, detention, transportation or sale of slaves § 1586. Service on vessels in slave trade § 1587. Possession of slaves aboard vessel § 1588. Transportation of slaves from United States § 1589. Forced labor § 1590. Trafficking with respect to peonage, slavery, involuntary servitude, or forced labor § 1591. Sex trafficking of children or by force, fraud, or coercion § 1592. Unlawful conduct with respect to documents in furtherance of trafficking, peonage, slavery, involuntary servitude, or forced labor § 1593. Mandatory restitution § 1593A. Benefitting financially from peonage, slavery, and trafficking in persons § 1594. General provisions § 1595. Civil remedy § 1595A. Civil injunctions § 1596. Additional jurisdiction in certain trafficking offenses § 1597. Unlawful conduct with respect to immigration documents

==== Chapter 79: Perjury ====
§ 1621. Perjury generally § 1622. Subornation of perjury § 1623. False declarations before grand jury or court

==== Chapter 81: Piracy and privateering ====
§ 1651. Piracy under law of nations § 1652. Citizens as pirates § 1653. Aliens as pirates § 1654. Arming or serving on privateers § 1655. Assault on commander as piracy § 1656. Conversion or surrender of vessel § 1657. Corruption of seamen and confederating with pirates § 1658. Plunder of distressed vessel § 1659. Attack to plunder vessel § 1660. Receipt of pirate property § 1661. Robbery ashore

==== Chapter 83: Postal Service ====
§ 1691. Laws governing postal savings § 1692. Foreign mail as United States mail § 1693. Carriage of mail generally § 1694. Carriage of matter out of mail over post routes § 1695. Carriage of matter out of mail on vessels § 1696. Private express for letters and packets § 1697. Transportation of persons acting as private express § 1698. Prompt delivery of mail from vessel § 1699. Certification of delivery from vessel § 1700. Desertion of mails § 1701. Obstruction of mails generally § 1702. Obstruction of correspondence § 1703. Delay or destruction of mail or newspapers § 1704. Keys or locks stolen or reproduced § 1705. Destruction of letter boxes or mail § 1706. Injury to mail bags § 1707. Theft of property used by Postal Service § 1708. Theft or receipt of stolen mail matter generally § 1709. Theft of mail matter by officer or employee § 1710. Theft of newspapers § 1711. Misappropriation of postal funds § 1712. Falsification of postal returns to increase compensation § 1713. Issuance of money orders without payment § 1715. Firearms as nonmailable; regulations § 1716. Injurious articles as nonmailable § 1716A. Nonmailable locksmithing devices and motor vehicle master keys § 1716B. Nonmailable plants § 1716C. Forged agricultural certifications § 1716D. Nonmailable injurious animals, plant pests, plants, and illegally taken fish, wildlife, and plants § 1716E. Tobacco products as nonmailable § 1717. Letters and writings as nonmailable § 1719. Franking privilege § 1720. Canceled stamps and envelopes § 1721. Sale or pledge of stamps § 1722. False evidence to secure second-class rate § 1723. Avoidance of postage by using lower class matter § 1724. Postage on mail delivered by foreign vessels § 1725. Postage unpaid on deposited mail matter § 1726. Postage collected unlawfully § 1728. Weight of mail increased fraudulently § 1729. Post office conducted without authority § 1730. Uniforms of carriers § 1731. Vehicles falsely labeled as carriers § 1732. Approval of bond or sureties by postmaster § 1733. Mailing periodical publications without prepayment of postage § 1734. Editorials and other matter as "advertisements" § 1735. Sexually oriented advertisements § 1736. Restrictive use of information § 1737. Manufacturer of sexually related mail matter

==== Chapter 84: Presidential and Presidential staff assassination, kidnapping, and assault ====
This chapter, added in 1965 by 79 Stat. 580, deals with presidential and presidential staff assassination, kidnapping, and assault and presence in a restricted zone designated. It has two sections.

- § 1751. Presidential and Presidential staff assassination, kidnapping, and assault; penalties: life time in jail or even death
- § 1752. Restricted building or grounds

==== Chapter 85: Prison-made goods ====
§ 1761. Transportation or importation § 1762. Marking packages

==== Chapter 87: Prisons ====
§ 1791. Providing or possessing contraband in prison § 1792. Mutiny and riot prohibited § 1793. Trespass on Bureau of Prisons reservations and land

=== Chapters 88–99 ===
==== Chapter 88: Privacy ====
This chapter, added in 2004 by 118 Stat. 3999, deals with privacy and voyeurism. It has only one section.

- § 1801. Video voyeurism

==== Chapter 89: Professions and occupations (Repealed) ====
Chapter 89 was repealed in 2020. It related to the transportation of dentures from unlicensed sources.

==== Chapter 90: Protection of trade secrets ====
This chapter, added in 1996 by 110 Stat. 3488, deals with trade secrets.

§ 1831. Economic espionage § 1832. Theft of trade secrets § 1833. Exceptions to prohibitions § 1834. Criminal forfeiture § 1835. Orders to preserve confidentiality § 1836. Civil proceedings § 1837. Applicability to conduct outside the United States § 1838. Construction with other laws § 1839. Definitions

==== Chapter 90a: Protection of unborn children ====
This chapter, added in 2004 by 118 Stat. 568, deals with federal feticide. It has only one section.

- § 1841. Protection of unborn children

==== Chapter 91: Public lands ====
(TBD)

==== Chapter 93: Public officers and employees ====
(TBD)

==== Chapter 95: Racketeering ====
§ 1951. Interference with commerce by threats or violence § 1952. Interstate and foreign travel or transportation in aid of racketeering enterprises [§ 1952A. Renumbered § 1958] [§ 1952B. Renumbered § 1959] § 1953. Interstate transportation of wagering paraphernalia § 1954. Offer, acceptance, or solicitation to influence operations of employee benefit plan § 1955. Prohibition of illegal gambling businesses § 1956. Laundering of monetary instruments § 1957. Engaging in monetary transactions in property derived from specified unlawful activity § 1958. Use of interstate commerce facilities in the commission of murder-for-hire § 1959. Violent crimes in aid of racketeering activity § 1960. Prohibition of unlicensed money transmitting businesses

==== Chapter 96: Racketeer influenced and corrupt organizations ====
§ 1961. Definitions § 1962. Prohibited activities § 1963. Criminal penalties § 1964. Civil remedies § 1965. Venue and process § 1966. Expedition of actions § 1967. Evidence § 1968. Civil investigative demand

==== Chapter 97: Railroads ====
§ 1991. Entering train to commit crime § 1992. Terrorist attacks and other violence against railroad carriers and against mass transportation systems on land, on water, or through the air [§ 1993. Repealed. Pub. L. 109–177, title I, § 110(a), Mar. 9, 2006, 120 Stat. 205]

==== Chapter 99: [Repealed] ====
This chapter, included in the original Title 18, prescribed penalties for committing of rape within the special maritime and territorial jurisdiction of the United States and for committing "carnal knowledge" with a minor under sixteen in the same jurisdiction.

=== Chapters 101–110A ===
==== Chapter 101: Records and reports ====
§ 2071. Concealment, removal, or mutilation generally § 2072. False crop reports § 2073. False entries and reports of moneys or securities § 2074. False weather reports § 2075. Officer failing to make returns or reports § 2076. Clerk of United States District Court

==== Chapter 102: Riots ====
§ 2101. Riots § 2102. Definitions

==== Chapter 103: Robbery and burglary ====
§ 2111. Special maritime and territorial jurisdiction § 2112. Personal property of United States § 2113. Bank robbery and incidental crimes § 2114. Mail, money, or other property of United States § 2115. Post office § 2116. Railway or steamboat post office § 2117. Breaking or entering carrier facilities § 2118. Robberies and burglaries involving controlled substances § 2119. Motor vehicles

==== Chapter 105: Sabotage ====
§ 2151. Definitions § 2152. Fortifications, harbor defenses, or defensive sea areas § 2153. Destruction of war material, war premises, or war utilities § 2154. Production of defective war material, war premises, or war utilities § 2155. Destruction of national-defense materials, national-defense premises, or national-defense utilities § 2156. Production of defective national-defense material, national-defense premises, or national-defense utilities [§ 2157. Repealed. Pub. L. 103–322, title XXXIII, § 330004(13), Sept. 13, 1994, 108 Stat. 2142]

==== Chapter 107: Seamen and stowaways ====
§ 2191. Cruelty to seamen § 2192. Incitation of seamen to revolt or mutiny § 2193. Revolt or mutiny of seamen § 2194. Shanghaiing sailors § 2195. Abandonment of sailors § 2196. Drunkenness or neglect of duty by seamen § 2197. Misuse of Federal certificate, license or document [§ 2198. Repealed. Pub. L. 101–647, title XII, § 1207(b), Nov. 29, 1990, 104 Stat. 4832] § 2199. Stowaways on vessels or aircraft

==== Chapter 109: Searches and seizures ====
§ 2231. Assault or resistance § 2232. Destruction or removal of property to prevent seizure § 2233. Rescue of seized property § 2234. Authority exceeded in executing warrant § 2235. Search warrant procured maliciously § 2236. Searches without warrant § 2237. Criminal sanctions for failure to heave to, obstruction of boarding, or providing false information

==== Chapter 109a: Sexual abuse ====
§ 2241. Aggravated sexual abuse § 2242. Sexual abuse § 2243. Sexual abuse of a minor, a ward, or an individual in Federal custody § 2244. Abusive sexual contact § 2245. Offenses resulting in death § 2246. Definitions for chapter § 2247. Repeat offenders § 2248. Mandatory restitution

==== Chapter 109b: Sex offender and crimes against children registry ====
This chapter, added in 2006 by 120 Stat. 602, deals with sex offenders and failure to register. It has only one section.

- § 2250. Failure to register

==== Chapter 110: Sexual exploitation and other abuse of children ====
§ 2251. Sexual exploitation of children § 2251A. Selling or buying of children § 2252. Certain activities relating to material involving the sexual exploitation of minors § 2252A. Certain activities relating to material constituting or containing child pornography § 2252B. Misleading domain names on the Internet § 2252C. Misleading words or digital images on the Internet § 2253. Criminal forfeiture § 2254. Civil forfeiture § 2255. Civil remedy for personal injuries § 2256. Definitions for chapter § 2257. Record keeping requirements § 2257A. Record keeping requirements for simulated sexual conduct § 2258. Failure to report child abuse § 2258A. Reporting requirements of providers § 2258B. Limited liability for providers or domain name registrars § 2258C. Use to combat child pornography of technical elements relating to reports made to the CyberTipline § 2258D. Limited liability for NCMEC § 2258E. Definitions § 2259. Mandatory restitution § 2259A. Assessments in child pornography cases § 2259B. Child pornography victims reserve § 2260. Production of sexually explicit depictions of a minor for importation into the United States § 2260A. Penalties for registered sex offenders

==== Chapter 110a: Domestic violence and stalking ====
§ 2261. Interstate domestic violence § 2261A. Stalking § 2261B. Enhanced penalty for stalkers of children § 2262. Interstate violation of protection order § 2263. Pretrial release of defendant § 2264. Restitution § 2265. Full faith and credit given to protection orders § 2265A. Repeat offenders § 2266. Definitions

=== Chapters 111–123 ===
==== Chapter 111: Shipping ====
(TBD)

==== Chapter 111A: Destruction of, or interference with, vessels or maritime facilities ====
§ 2290. Jurisdiction and scope § 2291. Destruction of vessel or maritime facility § 2292. Imparting or conveying false information § 2293. Bar to prosecution

==== Chapter 113: Stolen property ====
- § 2311, Definitions.
- § 2312, Transportation of stolen vehicles.
- § 2313, Sale or receipt of stolen vehicles.
- § 2314, Transportation of stolen goods, securities, moneys, fraudulent State tax stamps, or articles used in counterfeiting.
- § 2315, Sale or receipt of stolen goods, securities, moneys, or fraudulent State tax stamps.
- § 2316, Transportation of livestock.
- § 2317, Sale or receipt of livestock.
- § 2318, Trafficking in counterfeit labels, illicit labels, or counterfeit documentation or packaging.
- § 2319, Criminal infringement of a copyright.
- § 2319A, Unauthorized fixation of and trafficking in sound recordings and music videos of live musical performances.
- § 2319B, Unauthorized recording of Motion pictures in a Motion picture exhibition facility.
- § 2319C, Illicit digital transmission services.
- § 2320, Trafficking in counterfeit goods or services.
- § 2321, Trafficking in certain motor vehicles or motor vehicle parts.
- § 2322, Chop shops.
- § 2323, Forfeiture, destruction, and restitution.

==== Chapter 113a: Telemarketing and email marketing fraud ====
§ 2325. Definition § 2326. Enhanced penalties § 2327. Mandatory restitution § 2328. Mandatory forfeiture

==== Chapter 113b: Terrorism ====
§ 2331. Definitions § 2332. Criminal penalties § 2332a. Use of weapons of mass destruction § 2332b. Acts of terrorism transcending national boundaries [§ 2332c. Repealed. Pub. L. 105–277, div. I, title II, § 201(c)(1), Oct. 21, 1998, 112 Stat. 2681–871] § 2332d. Financial transactions § 2332e. Requests for military assistance to enforce prohibition in certain emergencies § 2332f. Bombings of places of public use, government facilities, public transportation systems and infrastructure facilities § 2332g. Missile systems designed to destroy aircraft § 2332h. Radiological dispersal devices § 2332i. Acts of nuclear terrorism § 2333. Civil remedies § 2334. Jurisdiction and venue § 2335. Limitation of actions § 2336. Other limitations § 2337. Suits against Government officials § 2338. Exclusive Federal jurisdiction § 2339. Harboring or concealing terrorists § 2339A. Providing material support to terrorists § 2339B. Providing material support or resources to designated foreign terrorist organizations § 2339C. Prohibitions against the financing of terrorism § 2339D. Receiving military-type training from a foreign terrorist organization

==== Chapter 113c: Torture ====
§ 2340. Definitions § 2340A. Torture § 2340B. Exclusive remedies

==== Chapter 114: Trafficking in contraband cigarettes and smokeless tobacco ====
§ 2341. Definitions § 2342. Unlawful acts § 2343. Recordkeeping, reporting, and inspection § 2344. Penalties § 2345. Effect on State and local law § 2346. Enforcement and regulations

==== Chapter 115: Treason, sedition, and subversive activities ====
§ 2381. Treason § 2382. Misprision of treason § 2383. Rebellion or insurrection § 2384. Seditious conspiracy § 2385. Advocating overthrow of Government § 2386. Registration of certain organizations § 2387. Activities affecting armed forces generally § 2388. Activities affecting armed forces during war § 2389. Recruiting for service against United States § 2390. Enlistment to serve against United States [§ 2391. Repealed. Pub. L. 103–322, title XXXIII, § 330004(13), Sept. 13, 1994, 108 Stat. 2142]

==== Chapter 117: Transportation for illegal sexual activity and related crimes ====
§ 2421. Transportation generally § 2421A. Promotion or facilitation of prostitution and reckless disregard of sex trafficking § 2422. Coercion and enticement § 2423. Transportation of minors § 2424. Filing factual statement about alien individual § 2425. Use of interstate facilities to transmit information about a minor § 2426. Repeat offenders § 2427. Inclusion of offenses relating to child pornography in definition of sexual activity for which any person can be charged with a criminal offense § 2428. Forfeitures § 2429. Mandatory restitution

==== Chapter 118: War crimes ====
§ 2441. War crimes § 2442. Recruitment or use of child soldiers

==== Chapter 119: Wire and electronic communications interception and interception of oral communications ====
§ 2510. Definitions § 2511. Interception and disclosure of wire, oral, or electronic communications prohibited § 2512. Manufacture, distribution, possession, and advertising of wire, oral, or electronic communication intercepting devices prohibited § 2513. Confiscation of wire, oral, or electronic communication intercepting devices [§ 2514. Repealed. Pub. L. 91–452, title II, § 227(a), Oct. 15, 1970, 84 Stat. 930] § 2515. Prohibition of use as evidence of intercepted wire or oral communications § 2516. Authorization for interception of wire, oral, or electronic communications § 2517. Authorization for disclosure and use of intercepted wire, oral, or electronic communications § 2518. Procedure for interception of wire, oral, or electronic communications § 2519. Reports concerning intercepted wire, oral, or electronic communications § 2520. Recovery of civil damages authorized § 2521. Injunction against illegal interception § 2522. Enforcement of the Communications Assistance for Law Enforcement Act § 2523. Executive agreements on access to data by foreign governments

==== Chapter 121: Stored wire and electronic communications and transactional records access ====
§ 2701. Unlawful access to stored communications § 2702. Voluntary disclosure of customer communications or records § 2703. Required disclosure of customer communications or records § 2704. Backup preservation § 2705. Delayed notice § 2706. Cost reimbursement § 2707. Civil action § 2708. Exclusivity of remedies § 2709. Counterintelligence access to telephone toll and transactional records § 2710. Wrongful disclosure of video tape rental or sale records § 2711. Definitions for chapter § 2712. Civil actions against the United States § 2713. Required preservation and disclosure of communications and records

==== Chapter 123: Prohibition on release and use of certain personal information from state motor vehicle records ====
§ 2721. Prohibition on release and use of certain personal information from State motor vehicle records § 2722. Additional unlawful acts § 2723. Penalties § 2724. Civil action § 2725. Definitions

== Part II—Criminal Procedure ==
As per Part I, the odd-numbered chapters (201 to 237) were enacted with the original Title 18, and the even-numbered or additional sections were added at a later date.

=== Chapters 201–211 ===
==== Chapter 201: General Provisions ====
- § 3001. Procedure governed by rules; scope, purpose and effect; definition of terms; local rules; forms—(Rule): Refer to Rule 56 of the Federal Rules of Criminal Procedure.
- § 3002. Courts always open—(Rule): Refer to Rule 56 of the Federal Rules of Criminal Procedure.
- § 3003. Calendars—(Rule): Refer to Rule 50 of the Federal Rules of Criminal Procedure.
- § 3004. Decorum in court room—(Rule) Refer to Rule 53 of the Federal Rules of Criminal Procedure.
- § 3005. Counsel and witnesses in capital cases: Last amended in 1994. Provides that whoever is indicted for treason or a capital crime may be defended by a lawyer, and the court before which the defendant is to be tried, or a judge thereof, shall promptly, upon the defendant's request, assign 2 such counsel, of whom at least 1 shall be learned in the law applicable to capital cases, and who shall have free access to the accused at all reasonable hours. The court must consider the recommendation of the Federal Public Defender organization, or, if no such organization exists in the district, of the Administrative Office of the United States Courts. Additionally, the defendant shall be allowed, in his defense, to make any proof that he can produce by lawful witnesses, and shall have the like process of the court to compel his witnesses to appear at his trial, as is usually granted to compel witnesses to appear on behalf of the prosecution.
- § 3006. Assignment of counsel—(Rule): Refer to Rules 5 and 44 of the Federal Rules of Criminal Procedure.
- § 3006A. Adequate representation of defendants: (TBD)
- § 3007. Motions—(Rule): Refer to Rule 12 and Rule 47 of the Federal Rules of Criminal Procedure.
- § 3008. Service and filing of papers—(Rule) Refer to Rule 49 of the Federal Rules of Criminal Procedure.
- § 3009. Records—(Rule) Refer to Rule 55 of the Federal Rules of Criminal Procedure.
- § 3010. Exceptions unnecessary—(Rule): Refer to Rule 51 of the Federal Rules of Criminal Procedure.
- § 3011. Computation of time—(Rule) Refer to Rule 45 of the Federal Rules of Criminal Procedure.
- § 3012. Repealed. Pub. L. 98–473, title II, § 218(a)(2), Oct. 12, 1984, 98 Stat. 2027. (TBD)
- § 3013. Special assessment on convicted persons
- § 3014. Additional special assessment

==== Chapter 203: Arrest and Commitment ====
- § 3041. Power of courts and magistrates
- § 3042. Extraterritorial jurisdiction
- [§ 3043. Repealed. Pub. L. 98–473, title II, § 204(c), Oct. 12, 1984, 98 Stat. 1986]
- § 3044. Complaint—(Rule)
- § 3045. Internal revenue violations
- § 3046. Warrant or summons—(Rule)
- § 3047. Multiple warrants unnecessary
- § 3048. Commitment to another district; removal—(Rule)
- § 3049. Warrant for removal
- § 3050. Bureau of Prisons employees' powers
- § 3051. Powers of Special Agents 11 So in original. The words "Special Agents" probably should not be capitalized. of Bureau of Alcohol, Tobacco, Firearms, and Explosives
- § 3052. Powers of Federal Bureau of Investigation
- § 3053. Powers of marshals and deputies
- [§ 3054. Repealed. Pub. L. 97–79, § 9(b)(3), Nov. 16, 1981, 95 Stat. 1079]
- § 3055. Officers' powers to suppress Indian liquor traffic
- § 3056. Powers, authorities, and duties of United States Secret Service
- § 3056A. Powers, authorities, and duties of United States Secret Service Uniformed Division
- § 3057. Bankruptcy investigations
- § 3058. Interned belligerent nationals
- [§§ 3059 to 3059B. Repealed. Pub. L. 107–273, div. A, title III, § 301(c)(2), Nov. 2, 2002, 116 Stat. 1781]
- § 3060. Preliminary examination
- § 3061. Investigative powers of Postal Service personnel
- § 3062. General arrest authority for violation of release conditions
- § 3063. Powers of Environmental Protection Agency
- § 3064. Powers of Federal Motor Carrier Safety Administration

==== Chapter 204: Rewards for Information Concerning Terrorist Acts and Espionage ====
- § 3071. Information for which rewards authorized
- § 3072. Determination of entitlement; maximum amount; Presidential approval; conclusiveness
- § 3073. Protection of identity
- § 3074. Exception of governmental officials
- [§ 3075. Repealed. Pub. L. 107–273, div. A, title III, § 301(c)(2), Nov. 2, 2002, 116 Stat. 1781]
- § 3076. Eligibility for witness security program
- § 3077. Definitions

==== Chapter 205: Searches and Seizures ====
- § 3101. Effect of rules of court—(Rule)
- § 3102. Authority to issue search warrant—(Rule)
- § 3103. Grounds for issuing search warrant—(Rule)
- § 3103a. Additional grounds for issuing warrant
- § 3104. Issuance of search warrant; contents—(Rule)
- § 3105. Persons authorized to serve search warrant
- § 3106. Officer authorized to serve search warrant—(Rule)
- § 3107. Service of warrants and seizures by Federal Bureau of Investigation
- § 3108. Execution, service, and return—(Rule)
- § 3109. Breaking doors or windows for entry or exit
- § 3110. Property defined—(Rule)
- § 3111. Property seizable on search warrant—(Rule)
- [§ 3112. Repealed. Pub. L. 97–79, § 9(b)(3), Nov. 16, 1981, 95 Stat. 1079]
- § 3113. Liquor violations in Indian country
- § 3114. Return of seized property and suppression of evidence; motion—(Rule)
- § 3115. Inventory upon execution and return of search warrant—(Rule)
- § 3116. Records of examining magistrate judge; return to clerk of court—(Rule)
- § 3117. Mobile tracking devices
- § 3118. Implied consent for certain tests

==== Chapter 206: Pen Registers and Trap and Trace Devices ====
- § 3121. General prohibition on pen register and trap and trace device use; exception
- § 3122. Application for an order for a pen register or a trap and trace device
- § 3123. Issuance of an order for a pen register or a trap and trace device
- § 3124. Assistance in installation and use of a pen register or a trap and trace device
- § 3125. Emergency pen register and trap and trace device installation
- § 3126. Reports concerning pen registers and trap and trace devices
- § 3127. Definitions for chapter

==== Chapter 207: Release and Detention Pending Judicial Proceedings ====
- § 3141. Release and detention authority generally
- § 3142. Release or detention of a defendant pending trial
- § 3143. Release or detention of a defendant pending sentence or appeal
- § 3144. Release or detention of a material witness
- § 3145. Review and appeal of a release or detention order
- § 3146. Penalty for failure to appear
- § 3147. Penalty for an offense committed while on release
- § 3148. Sanctions for violation of a release condition
- § 3149. Surrender of an offender by a surety
- § 3150. Applicability to a case removed from a State court
- [§ 3150a. Repealed. Pub. L. 98–473, title II, § 203(a), Oct. 12, 1984, 98 Stat. 1976]
- § 3151. Refund of forfeited bail
- § 3152. Establishment of pretrial services
- § 3153. Organization and administration of pretrial services
- § 3154. Functions and powers relating to pretrial services
- § 3155. Annual reports
- § 3156. Definitions

==== Chapter 208: Speedy Trial ====
- § 3161. Time limits and exclusions
- § 3162. Sanctions
- § 3163. Effective dates
- § 3164. Persons detained or designated as being of high risk
- § 3165. District plans—generally
- § 3166. District plans—contents
- § 3167. Reports to Congress
- § 3168. Planning process
- § 3169. Federal Judicial Center
- § 3170. Speedy trial data
- § 3171. Planning appropriations
- § 3172. Definitions
- § 3173. Sixth amendment rights
- § 3174. Judicial emergency and implementation

==== Chapter 209: Extradition ====
- § 3181. Scope and limitation of chapter
- § 3182. Fugitives from State or Territory to State, District, or Territory
- § 3183. Fugitives from State, Territory, or Possession into extraterritorial jurisdiction of United States
- § 3184. Fugitives from foreign country to United States
- § 3185. Fugitives from country under control of United States into the United States
- § 3186. Secretary of State to surrender fugitive
- § 3187. Provisional arrest and detention within extraterritorial jurisdiction
- § 3188. Time of commitment pending extradition
- § 3189. Place and character of hearing
- § 3190. Evidence on hearing
- § 3191. Witnesses for indigent fugitives
- § 3192. Protection of accused
- § 3193. Receiving agent's authority over offenders
- § 3194. Transportation of fugitive by receiving agent
- § 3195. Payment of fees and costs
- § 3196. Extradition of United States citizens

==== Chapter 211: Jurisdiction and Venue ====
- § 3231. District courts
- § 3232. District of offense—(Rule)
- § 3233. Transfer within district—(Rule)
- § 3234. Change of venue to another district—(Rule)
- § 3235. Venue in capital cases
- § 3236. Murder or manslaughter
- § 3237. Offenses begun in one district and completed in another
- § 3238. Offenses not committed in any district
- § 3239. Optional venue for espionage and related offenses
- § 3240. Creation of new district or division
- § 3241. Jurisdiction of offenses under certain sections
- § 3242. Indians committing certain offenses; acts on reservations
- § 3243. Jurisdiction of State of Kansas over offenses committed by or against Indians on Indian reservations
- § 3244. Jurisdiction of proceedings relating to transferred offenders

=== Chapters 212–219 ===
==== Chapter 212: Military Extraterritorial Jurisdiction ====
- § 3261. Criminal offenses committed by certain members of the Armed Forces and by persons employed by or accompanying the Armed Forces outside the United States
- § 3262. Arrest and commitment
- § 3263. Delivery to authorities of foreign countries
- § 3264. Limitation on removal
- § 3265. Initial proceedings
- § 3266. Regulations
- § 3267. Definitions

==== Chapter 212a: Extraterritorial Jurisdiction over Certain Trafficking In Persons Offenses ====
- § 3271. Trafficking in persons offenses committed by persons employed by or accompanying the Federal Government outside the United States
- § 3272. Definitions
- § 3273. Offenses committed by certain United States personnel stationed in Canada in furtherance of border security initiatives

==== Chapter 213: Limitations ====
- § 3281. Capital offenses: Last modified in 1994, consists of a single sentence: "An indictment for any offense punishable by death may be found at any time without limitation."
- § 3282. Offenses not capital:
- § 3283. Offenses against children: Last modified in 2006, consists of a single sentence. "No statute of limitations that would otherwise preclude prosecution for an offense involving the sexual or physical abuse, or kidnapping, of a child under the age of 18 years shall preclude such prosecution during the life of the child, or for ten years after the offense, whichever is longer." The exact wording of the section misspells kidnapping as kidnaping.
- § 3284. Concealment of bankrupt's assets: Last modified in 1978, consists of a single sentence: "The concealment of assets of a debtor in a case under title 11 shall be deemed to be a continuing offense until the debtor shall have been finally discharged or a discharge denied, and the period of limitations shall not begin to run until such final discharge or denial of discharge."
- § 3285. Criminal contempt: Has never been modified since its enactment in 1948. Consists of a single sentence: "No proceeding for criminal contempt within section 402 of this title shall be instituted against any person, corporation or association unless begun within one year from the date of the act complained of; nor shall any such proceeding be a bar to any criminal prosecution for the same act."
- § 3286. Extension of statute of limitation for certain terrorism offenses
- § 3287. Wartime suspension of limitations
- § 3288. Indictments and information dismissed after period of limitations: Consists of two paragraphs, last modified in 1988.
- § 3289. Indictments and information dismissed before period of limitations: Consists of two paragraphs, last modified in 1994.
- § 3290. Fugitives from justice: Has not been modified since its enactment in 1948. Consists of a single sentence. "No statute of limitations shall extend to any person fleeing from justice."
- § 3291. Nationality, citizenship and passports: Added in 1951, last modified in 1994. Provides that "no person shall be prosecuted, tried, or punished for violation of any provision of sections 1423 to 1428, inclusive, of chapter 69 and sections 1541 to 1544, inclusive, of chapter 75 of title 18 of the United States Code, or for conspiracy to violate any of such sections, unless the indictment is found or the information is instituted within ten years after the commission of the offense."
- § 3292. Suspension of limitations to permit United States to obtain foreign evidence
- § 3293. Financial institution offenses: Added in 1989, last modified in 1994. Provides for a ten-year statute of limitations for a violation of, or a conspiracy to violate section 215, 656, 657, 1005, 1006, 1007, 1014, 1033, or 1344, section 1341 or 1343, if the offense affects a financial institution or section 1963, to the extent that the racketeering activity involves a violation of section 1344, unless the indictment is returned or the information is filed within 10 years after the commission of the offense.
- § 3294. Theft of major artwork. Added in 1994, consists of a single sentence: "No person shall be prosecuted, tried, or punished for a violation of or conspiracy to violate section 668 unless the indictment is returned or the information is filed within 20 years after the commission of the offense."
- § 3295. Arson offenses. Added in 1996, consists of a single sentence: "No person shall be prosecuted, tried, or punished for any non-capital offense under section 81 or subsection (f), (h), or (i) of section 844 unless the indictment is found or the information is instituted not later than 10 years after the date on which the offense was committed."
- § 3296. Counts dismissed pursuant to a plea agreement
- § 3297. Cases involving DNA evidence. Added in 2004, consists of a single sentence: "In a case in which DNA testing implicates an identified person in the commission of a felony, no statute of limitations that would otherwise preclude prosecution of the offense shall preclude such prosecution until a period of time following the implication of the person by DNA testing has elapsed that is equal to the otherwise applicable limitation period."
- § 3298. Trafficking-related offenses. Added in 2006, consists of a single sentence: "No person shall be prosecuted, tried, or punished for any non-capital offense or conspiracy to commit a non-capital offense under section 1581 (Peonage; Obstructing Enforcement), 1583 (Enticement into Slavery), 1584 (Sale into Involuntary Servitude), 1589 (Forced Labor), 1590 (Trafficking with Respect to Peonage, Slavery, Involuntary Servitude, or Forced Labor), or 1592 (Unlawful Conduct with Respect to Documents in furtherance of Trafficking, Peonage, Slavery, Involuntary Servitude, or Forced Labor) of this title or under section 274(a) of the Immigration and Nationality Act unless the indictment is found or the information is instituted not later than 10 years after the commission of the offense."
- § 3299. Child abduction and sex offenses. Added in 2006, consists of a single sentence: "Notwithstanding any other law, an indictment may be found or an information instituted at any time without limitation for any offense under section 1201 involving a minor victim, and for any felony under chapter 109A, 110 (except for section [1] [sic] 2257 and 2257A), or 117, or section 1591."
- § 3300. Recruitment or use of child soldiers. Added in 2008, consists of a single sentence: "No person may be prosecuted, tried, or punished for a violation of section 2442 unless the indictment or the information is filed not later than 10 years after the commission of the offense."
- § 3301. Securities fraud offenses

==== Chapter 215: Grand Jury ====
- § 3321. Number of grand jurors; summoning additional jurors
- § 3322. Disclosure of certain matters occurring before grand jury
- [§§ 3323 to 3328. Repealed. Pub. L. 101–73, title IX, § 964(a), Aug. 9, 1989, 103 Stat. 505]

==== Chapter 216: Special Grand Jury ====
- § 3331. Summoning and term
- § 3332. Powers and duties
- § 3333. Reports
- § 3334. General provisions

==== Chapter 217: Indictment and Information ====
- § 3361. Form and contents—(Rule)
- § 3362. Waiver of indictment and prosecution on information—(Rule)
- § 3363. Joinder of offenses—(Rule)
- § 3364. Joinder of defendants—(Rule)
- § 3365. Amendment of information—(Rule)
- § 3366. Bill of particulars—(Rule)
- § 3367. Dismissal—(Rule)

==== Chapter 219: Trial by United States Magistrate Judges ====
- § 3401. Misdemeanors; application of probation laws
- § 3402. Rules of procedure, practice and appeal

Section catchline was not amended to conform to change made in text by Pub. L. 100–702.

=== Chapters 221 to 227 ===
==== Chapter 221: Arraignment, Pleas and Trial ====
- § 3431. Term of court; power of court unaffected by expiration—(Rule)
- § 3432. Indictment and list of jurors and witnesses for prisoner in capital cases
- § 3433. Arraignment—(Rule)
- § 3434. Presence of defendant—(Rule)
- § 3435. Receiver of stolen property triable before or after principal
- § 3436. Consolidation of indictments or informations—(Rule)
- § 3437. Severance—(Rule)
- § 3438. Pleas—(Rule)
- § 3439. Demurrers and special pleas in bar or abatement abolished; relief on motion—(Rule)
- § 3440. Defenses and objections determined on motion—(Rule)
- § 3441. Jury; number of jurors; waiver—(Rule)
- § 3442. Jurors, examination, peremptory challenges; alternates—(Rule)
- § 3443. Instructions to jury—(Rule)
- § 3444. Disability of judge—(Rule)
- § 3445. Motion for judgment of acquittal—(Rule)
- § 3446. New trial—(Rule)

==== Chapter 223: Witnesses and Evidence ====
- § 3481. Competency of accused
- § 3482. Evidence and witnesses—(Rule)
- § 3483. Indigent defendants, process to produce evidence—(Rule)
- § 3484. Subpoenas—(Rule)
- § 3485. Expert witnesses—(Rule)
- § 3486. Administrative subpoenas
- [§ 3486A. Repealed. Pub. L. 106–544, § 5(b)(3), Dec. 19, 2000, 114 Stat. 2718]
- § 3487. Refusal to pay as evidence of embezzlement
- § 3488. Intoxicating liquor in Indian country as evidence of unlawful introduction
- § 3489. Discovery and inspection—(Rule)
- § 3490. Official record or entry—(Rule)
- § 3491. Foreign documents
- § 3492. Commission to consular officers to authenticate foreign documents
- § 3493. Deposition to authenticate foreign documents
- § 3494. Certification of genuineness of foreign document
- § 3495. Fees and expenses of consuls, counsel, interpreters and witnesses
- § 3496. Regulations by President as to commissions, fees of witnesses, counsel and interpreters
- § 3497. Account as evidence of embezzlement
- § 3498. Depositions—(Rule)
- § 3499. Contempt of court by witness—(Rule)
- § 3500. Demands for production of statements and reports of witnesses
- § 3501. Admissibility of confessions
- § 3502. Admissibility in evidence of eye witness testimony
- [§ 3503. Repealed. Pub. L. 107–273, div. B, title IV, § 4002(c)(3)(A), Nov. 2, 2002, 116 Stat. 1809]
- § 3504. Litigation concerning sources of evidence
- § 3505. Foreign records of regularly conducted activity
- § 3506. Service of papers filed in opposition to official request by United States to foreign government for criminal evidence
- § 3507. Special master at foreign deposition
- § 3508. Custody and return of foreign witnesses
- § 3509. Child victims' and child witnesses' rights
- § 3510. Rights of victims to attend and observe trial
- § 3511. Judicial review of requests for information
- § 3512. Foreign requests for assistance in criminal investigations and prosecutions

==== Chapter 224: Protection of Witnesses ====
- § 3521. Witness relocation and protection
- § 3522. Probationers and parolees
- § 3523. Civil judgments
- § 3524. Child custody arrangements
- § 3525. Victims Compensation Fund
- § 3526. Cooperation of other Federal agencies and State governments; reimbursement of expenses
- § 3527. Additional authority of Attorney General
- § 3528. Definition

==== Chapter 225: Verdict ====
- § 3531. Return; several defendants; conviction of less offense; poll of jury—(Rule)
- § 3532. Setting aside verdict of guilty; judgment notwithstanding verdict—(Rule)

==== Chapter 227: Sentences ====
- SUBCHAPTER A—GENERAL PROVISIONS (§§ 3551 – 3559)
  - § 3551. Authorized sentences
  - § 3552. Presentence reports
  - § 3553. Imposition of a sentence
  - § 3554. Order of criminal forfeiture
  - § 3555. Order of notice to victims
  - § 3556. Order of restitution
  - § 3557. Review of a sentence
  - § 3558. Implementation of a sentence
  - § 3559. Sentencing classification of offenses
- SUBCHAPTER B—PROBATION (§§ 3561 – 3566)
  - § 3561. Sentence of probation
  - § 3562. Imposition of a sentence of probation
  - § 3563. Conditions of probation
  - § 3564. Running of a term of probation
  - § 3565. Revocation of probation
  - § 3566. Implementation of a sentence of probation
- SUBCHAPTER C—FINES (§§ 3571 – 3574)
  - § 3571. Sentence of fine
  - § 3572. Imposition of a sentence of fine and related matters
  - § 3573. Petition of the Government for modification or remission
  - § 3574. Implementation of a sentence of fine
- SUBCHAPTER D—IMPRISONMENT (§§ 3581 – 3586)
  - § 3581. Sentence of imprisonment
  - § 3582. Imposition of a sentence of imprisonment
  - § 3583. Inclusion of a term of supervised release after imprisonment
  - § 3584. Multiple sentences of imprisonment
  - § 3585. Calculation of a term of imprisonment
  - § 3586. Implementation of a sentence of imprisonment

=== Chapters 228–238 ===
==== Chapter 228: Death Sentence ====
- § 3591. Sentence of death
- § 3592. Mitigating and aggravating factors to be considered in determining whether a sentence of death is justified
- § 3593. Special hearing to determine whether a sentence of death is justified
- § 3594. Imposition of a sentence of death
- § 3595. Review of a sentence of death
- § 3596. Implementation of a sentence of death
- § 3597. Use of State facilities
- § 3598. Special provisions for Indian country
- § 3599. Counsel for financially unable defendants

==== Chapter 228a: Post-Conviction DNA Testing ====
- § 3600. DNA testing
- § 3600A. Preservation of biological evidence

==== Chapter 229: Postsentence Administration ====
- SUBCHAPTER A—PROBATION (§§ 3601 – 3608)
  - § 3601. Supervision of probation
  - § 3602. Appointment of probation officers
  - § 3603. Duties of probation officers
  - § 3604. Transportation of a probationer
  - § 3605. Transfer of jurisdiction over a probationer
  - § 3606. Arrest and return of a probationer
  - § 3607. Special probation and expungement procedures for drug possessors
  - § 3608. Drug testing of Federal offenders on post-conviction release
- SUBCHAPTER B—FINES (§§ 3611 – 3615)
  - § 3611. Payment of a fine or restitution
  - § 3612. Collection of unpaid fine or restitution
  - § 3613. Civil remedies for satisfaction of an unpaid fine
  - § 3613A. Effect of default
  - § 3614. Resentencing upon failure to pay a fine or restitution
  - § 3615. Criminal default
- SUBCHAPTER C—IMPRISONMENT (§§ 3621 – 3626)
  - § 3621. Imprisonment of a convicted person
  - § 3622. Temporary release of a prisoner
  - § 3623. Transfer of a prisoner to State authority
  - § 3624. Release of a prisoner
  - § 3625. Inapplicability of the Administrative Procedure Act
  - § 3626. Appropriate remedies with respect to prison conditions
- SUBCHAPTER D—RISK AND NEEDS ASSESSMENT SYSTEM (§§ 3631 – 3635)
  - § 3631. Duties of the Attorney General
  - § 3632. Development of risk and needs assessment system
  - § 3633. Evidence-based recidivism reduction program and recommendations
  - § 3634. Report
  - § 3635. Definitions

==== Chapter 231: [Repealed] ====
Referred to probation and parole. Repealed or Renumbered. Pub. L. 98–473, title II, § 212(a)(1), (2), Oct. 12, 1984, 98 Stat. 1987

==== Chapter 232: Miscellaneous Sentencing Provisions ====
- § 3661. Use of information for sentencing
- § 3662. Conviction records
- § 3663. Order of restitution
- § 3663A. Mandatory restitution to victims of certain crimes
- § 3664. Procedure for issuance and enforcement of order of restitution
- § 3665. Firearms possessed by convicted felons
- § 3666. Bribe moneys
- § 3667. Liquors and related property; definitions
- § 3668. Remission or mitigation of forfeitures under liquor laws; possession pending trial
- § 3669. Conveyances carrying liquor
- § 3670. Disposition of conveyances seized for violation of the Indian liquor laws
- § 3671. Vessels carrying explosives and steerage passengers
- § 3672. Duties of Director of Administrative Office of the United States Courts
- § 3673. Definitions for sentencing provisions

==== Chapter 232a: Special Forfeiture of Collateral Profits of Crime ====
- § 3681. Order of special forfeiture
- § 3682. Notice to victims of order of special forfeiture

==== Chapter 233: Contempts ====
- § 3691. Jury trial of criminal contempts
- § 3692. Jury trial for contempt in labor dispute cases
- § 3693. Summary disposition or jury trial; notice—(Rule)

==== Chapter 235: Appeal ====
- § 3731. Appeal by United States
- § 3732. Taking of appeal; notice; time—(Rule)
- § 3733. Assignment of errors—(Rule)
- § 3734. Bill of exceptions abolished—(Rule)
- § 3735. Bail on appeal or certiorari—(Rule)
- § 3736. Certiorari—(Rule)
- § 3737. Record—(Rule)
- § 3738. Docketing appeal and record—(Rule)
- § 3739. Supervision—(Rule)
- § 3740. Argument—(Rule)
- § 3741. Harmless error and plain error—(Rule)
- § 3742. Review of a sentence

==== Chapter 237: Crime Victims Rights ====
This section consists of a single chapter.

- § 3771. Crime victims' rights

==== Chapter 238: Sexual assault survivors' rights ====
This section consists of a single chapter.

- § 3772. Sexual assault survivors' rights

== Part III—Prisons and Prisoners ==
As per Parts I and II, the odd-numbered sections (chapters 301 to 317) were enacted with the original Title 18, and the even-numbered or additional sections were added at a later date.

=== Chapters 301–311 ===
==== Chapter 301: General Provisions ====
- § 4001. Limitation on detention; control of prisons
- § 4002. Federal prisoners in State institutions; employment
- § 4003. Federal institutions in States without appropriate facilities
- § 4004. Oaths and acknowledgments
- § 4005. Medical relief; expenses
- § 4006. Subsistence for prisoners
- § 4007. Expenses of prisoners
- § 4008. Transportation expenses
- § 4009. Appropriations for sites and buildings
- § 4010. Acquisition of additional land
- § 4011. Disposition of cash collections for meals, laundry, etc.
- § 4012. Summary seizure and forfeiture of prison contraband
- § 4013. Support of United States prisoners in non-Federal institutions
- § 4014. Testing for human immunodeficiency virus

==== Chapter 303: Bureau of Prisons ====
- § 4041. Bureau of Prisons; director and employees
- § 4042. Duties of Bureau of Prisons
- § 4043. Acceptance of gifts and bequests to the Commissary Funds, Federal Prisons
- § 4044. Donations on behalf of the Bureau of Prisons
- § 4045. Authority to conduct autopsies
- § 4046. Shock incarceration program
- § 4047. Prison impact assessments
- § 4048. Fees for health care services for prisoners
- § 4049. Officers and employees of the Bureau of Prisons authorized to carry oleoresin capsicum spray
- § 4050. Secure firearms storage
- § 4051. Treatment of primary caretaker parents and other individuals

==== Chapter 305: Commitment and Transfer ====
- § 4081. Classification and treatment of prisoners
- § 4082. Commitment to Attorney General; residential treatment centers; extension of limits of confinement; work furlough
- § 4083. Penitentiary imprisonment; consent
- [§§ 4084, 4085. Repealed. Pub. L. 98–473, title II, § 218(a)(3), Oct. 12, 1984, 98 Stat. 2027]
- § 4086. Temporary safe-keeping of federal offenders by marshals

==== Chapter 306: Transfer To or From Foreign Countries ====
- § 4100. Scope and limitation of chapter
- § 4101. Definitions
- § 4102. Authority of the Attorney General
- § 4103. Applicability of United States laws
- § 4104. Transfer of offenders on probation
- § 4105. Transfer of offenders serving sentence of imprisonment
- § 4106. Transfer of offenders on parole; parole of offenders transferred
- § 4106A. Transfer of offenders on parole; parole of offenders transferred
- § 4107. Verification of consent of offender to transfer from the United States
- § 4108. Verification of consent of offender to transfer to the United States
- § 4109. Right to counsel, appointment of counsel
- § 4110. Transfer of juveniles
- § 4111. Prosecution barred by foreign conviction
- § 4112. Loss of rights, disqualification
- § 4113. Status of alien offender transferred to a foreign country
- § 4114. Return of transferred offenders
- § 4115. Execution of sentences imposing an obligation to make restitution or reparations

==== Chapter 307: Employment ====
- § 4121. Federal Prison Industries; board of directors
- § 4122. Administration of Federal Prison Industries
- § 4123. New industries
- § 4124. Purchase of prison-made products by Federal departments
- § 4125. Public works; prison camps
- § 4126. Prison Industries Fund; use and settlement of accounts
- § 4127. Prison Industries report to Congress
- § 4128. Enforcement by Attorney General
- § 4129. Authority to borrow and invest
- § 4130. Additional markets

==== Chapter 309 [Repealed] ====
Repealed per section 218 of title II of Public Law 98-473, and section 5 of Public Law 94-233.

==== Chapter 311 [Repealed] ====
Repealed per Public Law 98-473, title II, section 218(a)(5), as of October 12, 1984. 98 Stat. 2027.

=== Chapters 313–319 ===
==== Chapter 313: Offenders with Mental Disease or Defect ====
- § 4241. Determination of mental competency to stand trial to undergo postrelease proceedings

So in original. Probably should be "stand trial or to undergo postrelease proceedings".

- § 4242. Determination of the existence of insanity at the time of the offense
- § 4243. Hospitalization of a person found not guilty only by reason of insanity
- § 4244. Hospitalization of a convicted person suffering from mental disease or defect
- § 4245. Hospitalization of an imprisoned person suffering from mental disease or defect
- § 4246. Hospitalization of a person due for release but suffering from mental disease or defect
- § 4247. General provisions for chapter
- § 4248. Civil commitment of a sexually dangerous person

==== Chapter 314 ====
Repealed per Public Law 98-473, title II, section 218(a)(6), as of October 12, 1984. 98 Stat. 2027.

==== Chapter 315: Discharge and Release Payments ====
[§ 4281. Repealed. Pub. L. 98–473, title II, § 218(a)(7), Oct. 12, 1984, 98 Stat. 2027] § 4282. Arrested but unconvicted persons [§§ 4283, 4284. Repealed. Pub. L. 98–473, title II, § 218(a)(7), Oct. 12, 1984, 98 Stat. 2027] § 4285. Persons released pending further judicial proceedings

==== Chapter 317: Institutions for Women ====
- § 4321. Board of Advisers
- § 4322. Use of restraints on prisoners during the period of pregnancy, labor, and postpartum recovery prohibited

==== Chapter 319: National Institute of Corrections ====
- § 4351. Establishment; Advisory Board; appointment of members; compensation; officers; committees; delegation of powers; Director, appointment and powers

Section catchline editorially supplied.

- § 4352. Authority of Institute; time; records of recipients; access; scope of

Section catchline editorially supplied.

- [§ 4353. Repealed. Pub. L. 107–273, div. A, title III, § 301(a), Nov. 2, 2002, 116 Stat. 1780]

== Part IV—Correction of Youthful Offenders ==
As per Parts I, II, and III, the odd-numbered sections (chapters 401 and 403) were enacted with the original Title 18, with the lone section 402 being added afterwards, and later repealed.

=== Chapter 401: General provisions ===
- § 5001. Surrender to State authorities; expenses
- [§ 5002. Repealed. Pub. L. 104–134, title I, § 101[(a)] [title VI, § 614(a)(1)], Apr. 26, 1996, 110 Stat. 1321, 1321–65; renumbered title I, Pub. L. 104–140, § 1(a), May 2, 1996, 110 Stat. 1327]
- § 5003. Custody of State offenders

=== Chapter 402: Repealed ===
Has been repealed in its entirety.

  - Sections 5005 and 5006: have been repealed per Public Law 98-473, title II, section 218(a)(8), as of October 12, 1984. 98 Stat. 2027.
  - Sections 5007, 5008, and 5009: have been repealed per Public Law 94-233, section 5, as of March 15, 1976. 90 Stat. 231.
  - Sections 5010 through 5026: have been repealed per Public Law 98-473, title II, section 218(a)(8), as of October 12, 1984. 98 Stat. 2027.

=== Chapter 403: Juvenile delinquency ===
- § 5031. Definitions
- § 5032. Delinquency proceedings in district courts; transfer for criminal prosecution
- § 5033. Custody prior to appearance before magistrate judge
- § 5034. Duties of magistrate judge
- § 5035. Detention prior to disposition
- § 5036. Speedy trial
- § 5037. Dispositional hearing
- § 5038. Use of juvenile records
- § 5039. Commitment
- § 5040. Support
- [§ 5041. Repealed. Pub. L. 98–473, title II, § 214(b), Oct. 12, 1984, 98 Stat. 2014]
- § 5042. Revocation of probation
- § 5043. Juvenile solitary confinement

== Part V—Immunity of Witnesses ==
Part V was not included in the original Title 18. It was added in 1970. It consists of a single chapter.

=== Chapter 601: Immunity of Witnesses ===
§ 6001. Definitions § 6002. Immunity generally § 6003. Court and grand jury proceedings § 6004. Certain administrative proceedings § 6005. Congressional proceedings

This statute covers a specific way to satisfy the Fifth Amendment (right to silence as a form of protection against self-incrimination) to the Constitution, but still force witnesses to testify. Basically, if a witness—whether in a federal court such as a United States District Court or in testimony before a Congressional subcommittee—refuses to answer questions and pleads the 5th, the presiding officer can use the provisions of Title 18 Chapter 601 to forcibly compel the witness to answer the questions. Since this would violate the 5th amendment rights of the witness, the statute requires that the presiding officer must mandatorily preserve those rights, by guaranteeing the witness legal immunity for anything they might truthfully say under such compulsion. (The witness is being compelled to answer the questions truthfully—if they lie, they can be tried in court for perjury, but as long as they tell the truth, they are immune from being personally prosecuted for anything they might say—the reverse of the usual situation, where anything you say can and will be used against you in a court of law.)

Actually giving a particular witness guaranteed immunity as a means to compelling their testimony is somewhat involved; the details of how it is done vary depending on the particular branch of government hearing the testimony. If the witness is testifying before an agency (includes Army/Navy/AirForce/VA/DOD/HomeSec/StateDept, FCC/FTC, DOT/NTSB, DOE/NRC/COP/DeptOfTheInterior, SEC/CFTC/FedBoard/FDIC, NLRB/LaborDept/CommerceDept/AgDept, DOJ/Treasury, and many others), the presiding officer for the agency needs approval from the federal Attorney General before they can grant a witness immunity and compel testimony. In court cases, the federal district attorney (for the particular federal district court having jurisdiction in the case) needs approval from either the federal attorney general directly or from a specific set of the federal attorney general's underlings. In the case of testimony before congress, the body hearing the testimony must vote on whether or not to give immunity as a means to compel testimony, before getting a federal district court to issue to compulsion order; for a subcommittee, two-thirds of the full membership must vote affirmative, whereas for testimony before an entire house of congress a simple majority of members present voting affirmative is acceptable. Although congress must notify the federal attorney general 10 days in advance of submitting their request for compulsion to the federal district court, the AG cannot veto the order (but they can at their option instruct the federal district court to delay issuing the compulsion order for a period up to 20 days total).

== See also ==
- Criminal law of the United States
- Conspiracy against the United States
