= Fraud Enforcement and Recovery Act of 2009 =

American federal law

- Long title: An act to improve enforcement of mortgage fraud, securities fraud and commodities fraud, financial institution fraud, and other frauds related to Federal assistance and relief programs, for the recovery of funds lost to these frauds, and for other purposes.
- Acronyms (colloquial): FERA
- Enacted by: the 111th United States Congress
- Effective: May 20, 2009

Citations
- Public law: 111-21
- Statutes at Large: 123 Stat. 1617

Codification
- Titles amended: 18, 31
- U.S.C. sections created: 18 USC §27
- U.S.C. sections amended: 18 USC §20; 18 USC §1014; 18 USC §1031(a); 18 USC §1348; 18 USC §1956(c); 18 USC §1957(f); 31 USC §3729; 31 USC §3730(h); 31 USC §3731(b); 31 USC §3732; 31 USC §3733

Legislative history
- Introduced in the Senate as S. 386 by Patrick Leahy (D-VT) on February 5, 2009; Committee consideration by Senate Judiciary; Passed the Senate on April 28, 2009 (92-4); Passed the House on May 6, 2009 (367-59) with amendment; Senate agreed to House amendment on May 14, 2009 (unanimous consent) with further amendment; House agreed to Senate amendment on May 18, 2009 (338-52); Signed into law by President Barack Obama on May 20, 2009

The Fraud Enforcement and Recovery Act of 2009, or FERA, Pub. L. 111–21 (text) (PDF), S. 386, 123 Stat. 1617, enacted May 20, 2009, is a public law in the United States enacted in 2009. The law enhanced criminal enforcement of federal fraud laws, especially regarding financial institutions, mortgage fraud, and securities fraud or commodities fraud.

== Legislative history ==
U.S. Senator Patrick Leahy of Vermont, a Democrat and the chairman of the Senate Judiciary Committee, sponsored the bill.

On April 27, 2009, the Senate invoked cloture on the bill as amended (S. 386) on an 84–4 vote, with eleven not voting. Only four Senators voted no, all Republicans (Tom Coburn, Jim DeMint, James Inhofe, and Jon Kyl). On April 28, the Senate passed the bill on a 92–4 vote, with three not voting; the same Senators who voted against cloture voted against the bill.

On May 6, the United States House of Representatives passed the bill with its own amendment on a 367–59 vote, with six Representatives not voting and one Representative, Democrat Alan Grayson of Florida, voting present. All 250 Democrats casting votes, as well as 117 Republicans, voted yes; all of the 59 no votes were cast by Republicans.

The Senate then added an amendment to the House's amendment. The House accepted the final version of the bill on a 338–52 vote on May 18, with 43 Representatives not voting. All 224 Democrats casting votes, as well as 114 Republicans, voted yes. Fifty-two Republicans voted no.

President Barack Obama signed the legislation into law on May 20 along with the Helping Families Save Their Homes Act of 2009, a bill concerned with mortgage foreclosure prevention.

== Amendments to fraud statutes ==
The Act changes the definition of a financial institution for the purposes of Federal criminal law to include mortgage lending businesses, which are defined as "organizations which finance or refinance any debt secured by an interest in real estate, including private mortgage companies and any subsidiaries of such organizations, and whose activities affect interstate or foreign commerce." 18 U.S.C. § 1014, which makes it a federal offense to falsify loan documents submitted to a broad range of financial institutions, is amended to include mortgage lending businesses in that range, and for good measure also includes any other person "that makes in whole or in part a federally related mortgage loan".

The crime of major fraud against the United States (18 U.S.C. § 1031), which previously covered only fraud in government procurement and contracts for services, is amended to include a wider range of government involvement, including grants under the American Recovery and Reinvestment Act of 2009, transactions under the Troubled Assets Relief Program, and any "other form of Federal assistance". FERA amends the definition of securities fraud, 18 U.S.C. § 1348, to include fraud related to commodities futures and options in addition to the existing category of registered securities under the Securities Exchange Act of 1934.

Finally, the Act defines proceeds in the money laundering statute (18 U.S.C. § 1956) as "any property derived from or obtained or retained, directly or indirectly, through some form of unlawful activity, including the gross receipts of such activity". Previously, the term was left undefined, and was interpreted by the United States Supreme Court in United States v. Santos by a plurality of the justices as excluding gross receipts. A "Sense of the Congress" section suggests that senior prosecutors, such as a United States Attorney or superior, should be involved before certain kinds of money-laundering cases are instigated, and directs the Attorney General to deliver a yearly report on such cases for the next four years.

== Authorization for additional funding ==
Section 3 of the Act authorizes additional funding to detect and prosecute fraud at various federal agencies, specifically:

- $165,000,000 to the Department of Justice,
- $30,000,000 each to the Postal Inspection Service and the Office of the Inspector General at the United States Department of Housing and Urban Development (HUD/OIG)
- $20,000,000 to the Secret Service
- $21,000,000 to the Securities and Exchange Commission

These authorizations are made for the federal fiscal years beginning October 1, 2009 and 2010, after which point they expire, and are in addition to the previously authorized budgets for these agencies.

== False Claims Act restatement ==
Section 4 of FERA restates part of the False Claims Act, to "reflect the original intent of the law". This amendment is in reaction to the Supreme Court's 2008 decision in Allison Engine Co. v. United States ex rel. Sanders, in which the Court held that the mere involvement of Federal money was insufficient to bring a fraudulent claim or invoice within the scope of the False Claims Act. The amended subsection (a) of 31 U.S.C. § 3729 effectively reverses the Allison Engine decision, weakening the requirement to "a false record or statement material to a false or fraudulent claim", where a claim includes "any request or demand" related to a government program and which will be paid from funds supplied by the government.

== Financial Crisis Inquiry Commission ==
Finally, section 5 of the Act created the Financial Crisis Inquiry Commission, a legislative commission with each house of the United States Congress represented by three members appointed by the majority party and two members appointed by the minority, none of whom may be employees of the Federal government or any state or local government. The purpose of the commission is "to examine the causes, domestic and global, of the current financial and economic crisis in the United States."
