= Universal Health Services, Inc. v. United States ex rel. Escobar =

- Supreme Court of the United States

Argued April 19, 2016 Decided June 16, 2016
- Full case name: Universal Health Services, Inc. v. United States and Massachusetts ex rel. Julio Escobar and Carmen Correa
- Docket no.: 15-7
- Citations: 579 U.S. ___ (more) 136 S. Ct. 1989; 195 L. Ed. 2d 348
- Opinion announcement: Opinion announcement

Holding
- The implied false certification theory can be a basis for False Claims Act liability when a defendant submitting a claim makes specific representations about the goods or services provided, but fails to disclose noncompliance with material statutory, regulatory, or contractual requirements that make those representations misleading with respect to those goods or services.

Court membership
- Chief Justice John Roberts Associate Justices Anthony Kennedy · Clarence Thomas; Ruth Bader Ginsburg · Stephen Breyer; Samuel Alito · Sonia Sotomayor; Elena Kagan

Case opinion
- Majority: Thomas, joined by unanimous

Laws applied
- False Claims Act

Universal Health Services, Inc. v. United States ex rel. Escobar, 579 U.S. ___ (2016), was a United States Supreme Court case in which the Court held that "the implied false certification theory can be a basis for False Claims Act liability when a defendant submitting a claim makes specific representations about the goods or services provided, but fails to disclose noncompliance with material statutory, regulatory, or contractual requirements that make those representations misleading with respect to those goods or services."

== Opinion of the Court ==
Associate Justice Clarence Thomas authored a unanimous opinion.
