= United States ex rel. Schutte v. Supervalu Inc. =

- Supreme Court of the United States

Decided June 1, 2023
- Full case name: United States ex rel. Schutte v. Supervalu Inc.
- Docket no.: 21-1326
- Citations: 598 U.S. 739 (more)

Holding
- The False Claims Act's scienter element, which requires a defendant to "knowingly" give a "false" claim to the government, refers to a defendant’s knowledge and subjective beliefs. It does not refer to what an objectively reasonable person may have known or believed.

Court membership
- Chief Justice John Roberts Associate Justices Clarence Thomas · Samuel Alito; Sonia Sotomayor · Elena Kagan; Neil Gorsuch · Brett Kavanaugh; Amy Coney Barrett · Ketanji Brown Jackson

Case opinion
- Majority: Thomas, joined by unanimous

Laws applied
- False Claims Act

United States ex rel. Schutte v. Supervalu Inc., 598 U.S. 739 (2023), was a United States Supreme Court case in which the Court held that the False Claims Act's scienter element, which requires a defendant to "knowingly" give a "false" claim to the government, refers to a defendant's knowledge and subjective beliefs, not refer to what an objectively reasonable person may have known or believed.

== Background ==
Relators Schutte and Yarberry sued SuperValu under the FCA, alleging the company knowingly caused false payment claims to be submitted to Medicaid and Medicare programs by incorrectly reporting their drug prices. From 2006 to 2016, SuperValu's in-store pharmacies used a prescription program to match lower prescription prices of competitors and did not report the lower prices as its usual and customary prices.

== Opinion of the Court ==
Justice Clarence Thomas wrote the unanimous opinion. The court held the FCA's scienter element refers to defendant's knowledge and subjective beliefs, not to what an objectively reasonable person may have known or believed.

The court focused on the FCA statute. The term "knowingly" in the statute contains three mental states: the person "has actual knowledge of the information," "acts in deliberate ignorance of the truth or falsity of the information," and "acts in reckless disregard of the truth or falsity of the information." The court recognized that the FCA is largely a fraud statute that "tracks the traditional common-law scienter requirement for claims of fraud" which are actual knowledge, deliberate indifference, or recklessness." Each of these three concepts pertains to the defendant's lack of an honest belief in the statement's truth when making the claim, not what a defendant might have thought afterward."

== Impact ==
The decision was viewed as the highest-profile FCA decision at the time and left open questions about state of mind. Experts predicted that defendants would make more early settlements to avoid lengthy litigation.

== See also ==
- False Claims Act of 1863
