= False Claims Act of 1863 =

United States federal anti-fraud law

- Long title: An Act to prevent and punish Frauds upon the Government of the United States.
- Acronyms (colloquial): FCA
- Nicknames: Lincoln's Law
- Enacted by: the 37th United States Congress

Citations
- Statutes at Large: 12 Stat. 696

Codification
- U.S.C. sections created: 31 U.S.C. §§ 3729–3733

Legislative history
- Introduced in the United States Senate as S. 467 by Jacob M. Howard R‑MI on January 29, 1863; Signed into law by President Abraham Lincoln on March 2, 1863

Major amendments
- False Claims Act Amendments (Pub. L. 99–562, 100 Stat. 3153); Fraud Enforcement and Recovery Act of 2009; Affordable Care Act

United States Supreme Court cases
- United States v. Cohn, 270 U.S. 339 (1926); United States v. Gilliland, 312 U.S. 86 (1941); United States ex rel. Marcus v. Hess, 317 U.S. 537 (1943); United States v. Grainger, 346 U.S. 235 (1953); Rainwater v. United States, 356 U.S. 590 (1958); United States v. McNinch, 356 U.S. 595 (1958); United States v. Neifert-White Co., 390 U.S. 228 (1968); United States v. Bornstein, 423 U.S. 303 (1976); United States v. Halper, 490 U.S. 435 (1989); Hughes Aircraft Co. v. United States ex rel. Schumer, 520 U.S. 939 (1997); Vermont Agency of Natural Resources v. United States ex rel. Stevens, 529 U.S. 765 (2000); Cook County v. United States ex rel. Chandler, 538 U.S. 119 (2003); Graham County Soil and Water Conservation Dist. v. United States ex rel. Wilson, 545 U.S. 409 (2005); Rockwell International Corp. v. United States, 549 U.S. 457 (2007); Allison Engine Co. v. United States ex rel. Sanders, 553 U.S. 662 (2008); United States ex rel. Eisenstein v. City of New York, 556 U.S. 928 (2009); Graham County Soil and Water Conservation Dist. v. United States ex rel. Wilson, 559 U.S. 280 (2010); Schindler Elevator Corp. v. United States ex rel. Kirk, 563 U.S. 401 (2011); Kellogg Brown & Root Services, Inc. v. United States ex rel. Carter, 575 U.S. 650 (2015); Universal Health Services, Inc. v. United States ex rel. Escobar, 579 U.S. 176 (2016); State Farm Fire & Casualty Co. v. United States ex rel. Rigsby, 580 U.S. 26 (2016); Cochise Consultancy, Inc. v. United States ex rel. Hunt, 587 U.S. 262 (2019); United States ex rel. Schutte v. Supervalu Inc., 598 U.S. 739 (2023); United States ex rel. Polansky v. Executive Health Resources, Inc., 599 U.S. 419 (2023); Wisconsin Bell, Inc. v. United States ex rel. Heath, No. 23-1127, 604 U.S. ___ (2025)

The False Claims Act of 1863 (FCA) is an American federal law that imposes liability on persons and companies (typically federal contractors) who defraud governmental programs. It is the federal government's primary litigation tool in combating fraud against the federal government. The law includes a qui tam provision that allows people who are not affiliated with the government, called "relators" under the law, to file actions on behalf of the government. This is informally called "whistleblowing", especially when the relator is employed by the organization accused in the suit. Persons filing actions under the Act stand to receive a portion (15–30%, depending on certain factors) of any recovered damages.

As of 2024, over 83% of all FCA actions were initiated by whistleblowers. Claims under the law have typically involved government health care programs (Medicare, Medicaid and TriCare), military, or other government spending programs. FCA actions dominate the list of largest pharmaceutical settlements. Between 1987 and 2019, the government recovered more than $62 billion under the False Claims Act.

== History ==
Qui tam laws have history dating back to the Middle Ages in England. In 1318, King Edward II offered one third of the penalty to the relator when the relator successfully sued government officials who moonlighted as wine merchants. The Maintenance and Embracery Act 1540 of Henry VIII provided that common informers could sue for certain forms of interference with the course of justice in legal proceedings that were concerned with the title to land. This act is still in force today in the Republic of Ireland, although in 1967 it was extinguished in England. The idea of a common informer bringing suit for damages to the Commonwealth was later brought to Massachusetts, where "penalties for fraud in the sale of bread [are] to be distributed one third to inspector who discovered the fraud and the remainder for the benefit of the town where the offense occurred." Other statutes can be found on the colonial law books of Connecticut, New York, Virginia and South Carolina.

The American Civil War (1861–1865) was marked by fraud on all levels, both in the Union north and the Confederate south. During the war, unscrupulous contractors sold the Union Army decrepit horses and mules in ill health, faulty rifles and ammunition, and rancid rations and provisions, among other unscrupulous actions. In response, Congress passed the False Claims Act. President Lincoln signed it into law on March 2, 1863, 12 Stat. 696, and it is therefore sometimes called the "Lincoln Law".

Importantly, a reward was offered in what is called the qui tam provision, which permits citizens to sue on behalf of the government and be paid a percentage of the recovery. Qui tam is an abbreviated form of the Latin legal phrase qui tam pro domino rege quam pro se ipso in hac parte sequitur ("he who brings a case on behalf of our lord the King, as well as for himself") In a qui tam action, the citizen filing suit is called a "relator". As an exception to the general legal rule of standing, courts have held that qui tam relators are "partially assigned" a portion of the government's legal injury, thereby allowing relators to proceed with their suits.

U.S. Senator Jacob M. Howard, who sponsored the legislation, justified giving rewards to whistleblowers, many of whom had engaged in unethical activities themselves. He said, "I have based the [qui tam provision] upon the old-fashioned idea of holding out a temptation, and 'setting a rogue to catch a rogue,' which is the safest and most expeditious way I have ever discovered of bringing rogues to justice."

In the massive military spending leading up to and during World War II, the U.S. Attorney General relied on criminal provisions of the law to deal with fraud, rather than using the FCA. As a result, attorneys would wait for the Department of Justice to file criminal cases and then immediately file civil suits under the FCA, a practice decried at the time as "parasitic". Congress moved to abolish the FCA but at the last minute decided instead to reduce the relator's share of the recovered proceeds.

The law was again amended in 1986, again due to issues with military spending. Under President Ronald Reagan's military buildup, reports of massive fraud among military contractors had become major news, and Congress acted to strengthen the FCA.

The first qui tam case under the amended False Claims Act was filed in 1987 by an eye surgeon against an eye clinic and one of its doctors, alleging unnecessary surgeries and other procedures were being performed. The case settled in 1988 for a total of $605,000. However, the law was primarily used in the beginning against defense contractors. By the late 1990s, health care fraud began to receive more focus, accounting for approximately 40% of recoveries by 2008 Franklin v. Parke-Davis, filed in 1996, was the first case to apply the FCA to fraud committed by a pharma company against the government, due to bills submitted for payment by Medicaid/Medicare for treatments that those programs do not pay for as they are not FDA-approved or otherwise listed on a government formulary. FCA cases against pharma companies are often related to off-label marketing of drugs by drug companies, which is illegal under a different law, the Federal Food, Drug, and Cosmetic Act; the intersection occurs when off-label marketing leads to prescriptions being filled and bills for those prescriptions being submitted to Medicare/Medicaid.

As of 2019, more than 72 percent of all federal FCA actions were initiated by whistleblowers. The government recovered $62.1 billion under the False Claims Act between 1987 and 2019 and of this amount, over $44.7 billion or 72% was from qui tam cases brought by relators. In 2014, whistleblowers filed over 700 False Claims Act lawsuits. In 2014, the Department of Justice had its highest annual recovery in False Claims Act history, obtaining more than $6.1 billion in settlements and judgments from civil cases involving fraud and false claims against the government. In fiscal year 2019, the Department of Justice recovered over $3 billion under the False Claims Act, $2.2 billion of which were generated by whistleblowers. Since 2010, the federal government has recovered over $37.6 billion in False Claims Act settlements and judgments. In 2020, the DOJ recovered $2.2 billion from FCA cases: $1.6 billion of that total was from cases filed under the FCA. Qui tam whistleblowers received a total of $309 million in whistleblower rewards in 2020.

== Provisions ==
The Act establishes liability when any person or entity improperly receives from or avoids payment to the Federal government. The Act prohibits:

1. Knowingly presenting, or causing to be presented, a false claim for payment or approval;
2. Knowingly making, using, or causing to be made or used, a false record or statement material to a false or fraudulent claim;
3. Conspiring to commit any violation of the False Claims Act;
4. Falsely certifying the type or amount of property to be used by the government;
5. Certifying receipt of property on a document without completely knowing that the information is true;
6. Knowingly buying government property from an unauthorized officer of the government, and;
7. Knowingly making, using, or causing to be made or used a false record to avoid, or decrease an obligation to pay or transmit property to the government.
8. The False Claims act does not apply to IRS Tax matters.

The statute provides that anyone who violates the law "is liable to the United States Government for a civil penalty of not less than $5,000 and not more than $10,000, as adjusted by the Federal Civil Penalties Inflation Adjustment Act of 1990, plus 3 times the amount of damages which the Government sustains because of the act of that person." The False Claims Act requires a separate penalty for each violation of the statute. Under the Civil Penalties Inflation Adjustment Act, False Claims Act penalties are periodically adjusted for inflation. In 2020, the penalties range from $11,665 to $23,331 per violation.

Certain claims are not actionable, including:

1. certain actions against armed forces members, members of the United States Congress, members of the judiciary, or senior executive branch officials;
2. claims, records, or statements made under the Internal Revenue Code of 1986 which would include tax fraud;

There are unique procedural requirements in False Claims Act cases. For example:

1. a complaint under the False Claims Act must be filed under seal;
2. the complaint must be served on the government but must not be served on the defendant;
3. the complaint must be buttressed by a comprehensive memorandum, not filed in court, but served on the government detailing the factual underpinnings of the complaint.

In addition, the FCA contains an anti-retaliation provision, which allows a relator to recover, in addition to his award for reporting fraud, double damages plus attorney fees for any acts of retaliation for reporting fraud against the government. This provision specifically provides relators with a personal claim of double damages for harm suffered and reinstatement.

Under the False Claims Act, the Department of Justice is authorized to pay rewards to those who report fraud against the federal government and are not convicted of a crime related to the fraud, in an amount of between 15 and 25 (but up to 30% in some cases) of what it recovers based upon the whistleblower's report. The relator's share is determined based on the FCA itself, legislative history, Department of Justice guidelines released in 1997, and court decisions.

== 1986 changes ==
False Claims Act Amendments (Pub. L. 99–562, 100 Stat. 3153, enacted October 27, 1986)

1. The elimination of the "government possession of information" bar against qui tam lawsuits;
2. The establishment of defendant liability for "deliberate ignorance" and "reckless disregard" of the truth;
3. Restoration of the "preponderance of the evidence" standard for all elements of the claim including damages;
4. Imposition of treble damages and civil fines of $5,000 to $10,000 per false claim;
5. Increased rewards for qui tam plaintiffs of between 15 and 30% of the funds recovered from the defendant;
6. Defendant payment of the successful plaintiff's expenses and attorney's fees, and;
7. Employment protection for whistleblowers including reinstatement with seniority status, special damages, and double back pay.

== 2009 changes ==
On May 20, 2009, the Fraud Enforcement and Recovery Act of 2009 (FERA) was signed into law. It includes the most significant amendments to the FCA since the 1986 amendments. FERA enacted the following changes:

1. Expanded the scope of potential FCA liability by eliminating the "presentment" requirement (effectively overruling the Supreme Court's opinion in Allison Engine Co. v. United States ex rel. Sanders, 128 S. Ct. 2123 (2008));
2. Redefined "claim" under the FCA to mean "any request or demand, whether under a contract or otherwise for money or property and whether or not the United States has title to the money or property" that is (1) presented directly to the United States, or (2) "to a contractor, grantee, or other recipient, if the money or property is to be spent or used on the Government's behalf or to advance a Government program or interest" and the government provides or reimburses any portion of the requested funds;
3. Amended the FCA's intent requirement, and now requiring only that a false statement be "material to" a false claim;
4. Expanded conspiracy liability for any violation of the provisions of the FCA;
5. Amended the "reverse false claims" provisions to expand liability to "knowingly and improperly avoid[ing] or decreas[ing] an obligation to pay or transmit money or property to the Government;"
6. Increased protection for qui tam plaintiffs/relators beyond employees, to include contractors and agents;
7. Procedurally, the government's complaint will now relate back to the qui tam plaintiff/relator's filing;
8. Provided that whenever a state or local government is named as a co-plaintiff in an action, the government or the relator "shall not [be] preclude[d]... from serving the complaint, any other pleadings, or the written disclosure of substantially all material evidence;"
9. Increased the Attorney General's power to delegate authority to conduct Civil Investigative Demands prior to intervening in an FCA action.

With this revision, the FCA now prohibits knowingly (changes are in bold):

1. Submitting for payment or reimbursement a claim known to be false or fraudulent.
2. Making or using a false record or statement material to a false or fraudulent claim or to an 'obligation' to pay money to the government.
3. Engaging in a conspiracy to defraud by the improper submission of a false claim.
4. Concealing, improperly avoiding or decreasing an 'obligation' to pay money to the government.

== 2010 changes under the Patient Protection and Affordable Care Act ==
On March 23, 2010, the Patient Protection and Affordable Care Act (also referred to as the health reform bill or PPACA) was signed into law by President Barack Obama. The Affordable Care Act made further amendments to the False Claims Act, including:

1. Changes to the Public Disclosure Bar. Under the previous version of the FCA, cases filed by private individuals or "relators" could be barred if it was determined that such cases were based on a public disclosure of information arising from certain proceedings, such as civil, criminal or administrative hearings, or news media reports. As a result, defendants frequently used the public disclosure bar as a defense to a plaintiff's claims and grounds for dismissal of the same. PPACA amended the language of the FCA to allow the federal government to have the final word on whether a court may dismiss a case based on a public disclosure. The language now provides that "the court shall dismiss an action unless opposed by the Government, if substantially the same allegations or transaction alleged in the action or claim were publicly disclosed." See 31 U.S.C. 3730(e)(4)(A).
2. Original Source Requirement. A plaintiff may overcome the public disclosure bar outlined above if they qualify as an "original source," the definition of which has also been revised by PPACA. Previously, an original source must have had "direct and independent knowledge of the information on which the allegations are based." Under PPACA, an original source is now someone who has "knowledge that is independent of and materially adds to the publicly disclosed allegations or transactions." See 31 U.S.C. 3730(e)(4)(B).
3. Overpayments. FERA redefined "obligation" under the FCA to include "retention of any overpayments." Accordingly, such language imposed FCA liability on any provider who received Medicare/Medicaid overpayments (accidentally or otherwise) and fails to return the money to the government. However, FERA also raised questions as to what exactly is involved in the "retention of overpayments" – for example, how long a provider had to return monies after discovering an overpayment. PPACA clarified the changes to the FCA made by FERA. Under PPACA, overpayments under Medicare and Medicaid must be reported and returned within 60 days of discovery, or the date a corresponding hospital report is due. Failure to timely report and return an overpayment exposes a provider to liability under the FCA.
4. Statutory Anti-Kickback Liability. The federal Anti-Kickback Statute, 42 U.S.C. 1320a-7b(b) (AKS) is a criminal statute which makes it improper for anyone to solicit, receive, offer or pay remuneration (monetary or otherwise) in exchange for referring patients to receive certain services that are paid for by the government. Previously, many courts had interpreted the FCA to mean that claims submitted as a result of AKS violations were false claims and therefore gave rise to FCA liability (in addition to AKS penalties). However, although this was the "majority rule" among courts, there were always opportunities for courts to hold otherwise. Importantly, PPACA changed the language of the AKS to provide that claims submitted in violation of the AKS automatically constitute false claims for purposes of the FCA. Further, the new language of the AKS provides that "a person need not have actual knowledge ... or specific intent to commit a violation" of the AKS. Accordingly, providers will not be able to successfully argue that they did not know they were violating the FCA because they were not aware the AKS existed.

== Practical application of the law ==
The False Claims Act has a detailed process for making a claim. Mere complaints to the government agency are insufficient to bring claims under the Act. A complaint (lawsuit) must be filed in a U.S. District Court (Federal court) in camera (under seal). The Department of Justice (DOJ) must thence investigate within 60 days, but it often enjoys several months' worth of extensions by the Court. In this time, the department decides whether it will pursue the case.

If the case is pursued by DOJ, the amount of the reward is less than if the Department of Justice had decided not to pursue the case and the plaintiff/relator continues the lawsuit himself. However, the success rate is higher in cases that the Department of Justice decides to pursue.

Technically, the government has several options in handing cases. These include:

1. intervene in one or more counts of the pending qui tam action. This intervention expresses the Government's intention to participate as a plaintiff in prosecuting that count of the complaint. The department intervenes in fewer than 25% of filed qui tam actions.
2. decline to intervene in one or all counts of the pending qui tam action. If the United States declines to intervene, the relator (i.e., plaintiff) may prosecute the action alone and thus on behalf of the United States, but the United States is not a party to the proceedings apart from its right to any recovery. This option is frequently used by relators and their attorneys.
3. move to dismiss the relator's complaint, either because there is no case, or the case conflicts with significant statutory or policy interests of the United States.

In practice, there are two other options for the Department of Justice:

1. settle the pending qui tam action with the defendant prior to the intervention decision. This usually, but not always, results in a simultaneous intervention and settlement with the Department of Justice (and is included in the 25% intervention rate).
2. advise the relator that the Department of Justice intends to decline intervention. This usually, but not always, results in dismissal of the qui tam action, according to the U.S. Attorney's Office of the Eastern District of Pennsylvania.

There is case law where claims may be prejudiced if disclosure of the alleged unlawful act has been reported in the press, if complaints were filed to an agency instead of filing a lawsuit, or if the person filing a claim under the act is not the first person to do so. Individual states in the U.S. have different laws regarding whistleblowing involving state governments.

=== Federal income taxation of awards under FCA in the United States ===
The U.S. Internal Revenue Service (IRS) takes the position that, for Federal income tax purposes, qui tam payments to a relator under FCA are ordinary income and not capital gains. The IRS position was challenged by a relator in the case of Alderson v. United States; and, in 2012, the U.S. Court of Appeals for the Ninth Circuit upheld the IRS' stance. As of 2013, this remained the only circuit court decision on tax treatment of these payments.

== Relevant decisions by the United States Supreme Court ==
In a 2000 case, Vermont Agency of Natural Resources v. United States ex rel. Stevens, 529 U.S. 765 (2000), the United States Supreme Court held that a private individual may not bring suit in federal court on behalf of the United States against a State (or state agency) under the FCA. In Stevens, the Supreme Court also endorsed the "partial assignment" approach to qui tam relator standing to sue, which had previously been articulated by the Ninth Circuit Federal Court of Appeals and is an exception to the general legal rule for standing.

In a 2007 case, Rockwell International Corp. v. United States, the United States Supreme Court considered several issues relating to the "original source" exception to the FCA's public-disclosure bar. The Court held that (1) the original source requirement of the FCA provision setting for the original-source exception to the public-disclosure bar on federal-court jurisdiction is jurisdictional; (2) the statutory phrase "information on which the allegations are based" refers to the relator's allegations and not the publicly disclosed allegations; the terms "allegations" is not limited to the allegations in the original complaint, but includes, at a minimum, the allegations in the original complaint as amended; (3) relator's knowledge with respect to the pondcrete fell short of the direct and independent knowledge of the information on which the allegations are based required for him to qualify as an original source; and (4) the government's intervention did not provide an independent basis of jurisdiction with respect to the relator.

In a 2008 case, Allison Engine Co. v. United States ex rel. Sanders, the United States Supreme Court considered whether a false claim had to be presented directly to the Federal government, or if it merely needed to be paid with government money, such as a false claim by a subcontractor to a prime contractor. The Court found that the claim need not be presented directly to the government, but that the false statement must be made with the intention that it will be relied upon by the government in paying, or approving payment of, a claim. The Fraud Enforcement and Recovery Act of 2009 reversed the Court's decision and made the types of fraud to which the False Claims Act applies more explicit.

In a 2009 case, United States ex rel. Eisenstein v. City of New York, the United States Supreme Court considered whether, when the government declines to intervene or otherwise actively participate in a qui tam action under the False Claims Act, the United States is a "party" to the suit for purposes of Federal Rule of Appellate Procedure 4(a)(1)(A) (which requires that a notice of appeal in a federal civil action generally be filed within 30 days after entry of a judgment or order from which the appeal is taken). The Court held that when the United States has declined to intervene in a privately initiated FCA action, it is not a "party" for FRAP 4 purposes, and therefore, petitioner's appeal filed after 30 days was untimely.

In a 2016 case, Universal Health Services, Inc. v. United States ex rel. Escobar, the United States Supreme Court sought to clarify the standard for materiality under the FCA. The court unanimously upheld the implied certification theory of FCA liability and strengthened the FCA's materiality requirement.

In a 2023 combined case, United States ex rel. Schutte v. SuperValu Inc. and United States ex rel. Proctor v. Safeway, a unanimous U.S. Supreme Court opinion rejected an attempt to dilute the FCA's "knowledge standard." Under the knowledge standard, a defendant is liable under the FCA if a false claim is "knowingly" submitted to the government for payment. The statute defines "knowingly" as acting with actual knowledge, deliberate ignorance, or reckless disregard. The unanimous opinion found that a defendant is liable if it submits a false claim to the government based on its own knowledge and subjective beliefs — not what an objectively reasonable person may have thought.

In a 2024 case, Murray v. UBS Securities, LLC, et al. 601 U. S. 23 (2024), a unanimous U.S. Supreme Court endorsed a lower burden of proof for whistleblowers, holding that whistleblowers do not need to prove that an employer acted with "retaliatory intent" in order to be protected under the Sarbanes-Oxley Act. The Supreme Court found that a whistleblower needs only to prove that their actions in making a whistleblower complaint were a "contributing factor" in the employer's unfavorable action. The unanimous opinion found that liability hinges on a defendant's "knowledge and subjective beliefs" — not what an objective, reasonable person would have thought — at the time they submitted their claims to the government.

== State False Claims Acts ==
As of 2020, 29 states and the District of Columbia have false-claims laws modeled on the federal statute to protect their publicly funded programs from fraud by including qui tam provisions, which enables them to recover money at state level. Some of these state False Claims Act statutes provide similar protections to those of the federal law, while others limit recovery to claims of fraud related to the Medicaid program.

The California False Claims Act was enacted in 1987, but lay relatively dormant until the early 1990s, when public entities, frustrated by what they viewed as a barrage of unjustified and unmeritorious claims, began to employ the False Claims Act as a defensive measure.

In 1995, the State of Texas passed the Texas Medicaid Fraud Prevention Act (TMFPA), which specifically aims at combating fraud against the Texas Medicaid Program, which provides healthcare and prescription drug coverage to low-income individuals. The Texas law enacts state qui tam provisions that allow individuals to report fraud and initiate action against violations of the TMFPA, imposes consequences for noncompliance and includes whistleblower protections.

== Influence on other countries ==
=== Australia ===
In Australia, The Treasury Laws Amendment (Enhancing Whistleblower Protections) Act, was passed in December 2018 and went into effect in 2019. The law expanded protections for whistleblowers, allowing them to report misconduct anonymously, as well as applying anti-retaliation protections to additional kinds of whistleblowers. Importantly, the law does not provide for rewards for whistleblowers. There have been calls since 2011 for legislation modeled on the False Claims Act and for their application to the tobacco industry and carbon pricing schemes.

=== United Kingdom ===
In October 2013, the UK Government announced that it was considering the case for financially incentivising individuals reporting fraud in economic crime cases by private sector organisations, in an approach much like the US False Claims Act. The 'Serious and Organised Crime Strategy' paper released by the UK's Secretary of State for the Home Department sets out how that government plans to take action to prevent serious and organised crime and strengthen protections against and responses to it. The paper asserted that serious and organised crime costs the UK more than £24 billion a year. In the context of anti-corruption, the paper acknowledged that there was a need to not only target serious and organised criminals but also support those who seek to help identify and disrupt serious and organised criminality.

Three UK agencies, the Department for Business, Innovation and Skills, the Ministry of Justice and the Home Office, were tasked with considering the case for a US-style False Claims Act in the UK. In July 2014, the Financial Conduct Authority and the Bank of England Prudential Regulation Authority recommended Parliament enact strong measures to encourage and protect whistleblowers, but without offering whistleblower rewards, rejecting the US model.

== Rule 9(b) circuit split ==
Under Rule 9(b) of the Federal Rules of Civil Procedure, allegations of fraud or mistake must be pleaded with particularity. All appeals courts to have addressed the issue of whether Rule 9(b) pleading standards apply to qui tam actions have held that the heightened standard applies. The Fifth Circuit, the Sixth Circuit, the Seventh Circuit, the Eighth Circuit, the Tenth Circuit, and the Eleventh Circuit have all found that plaintiffs must allege specific false claims.

In 2010, the First Circuit decision in U.S. ex rel. Duxbury v. Ortho Biotech Prods., L.P.(2009) and the Eleventh Circuit ruling in U.S. ex rel. Hopper v. Solvay Pharms., Inc.(2009) were both appealed to the U.S. Supreme Court. The Court denied certiorari for both cases, however, declining to resolve the divergent appeals court decisions.

== ACLU et al. v. Holder ==
In 2009, the American Civil Liberties Union (ACLU), Government Accountability Project (GAP) and OMB Watch filed suit against the Department of Justice challenging the constitutionality of the "seal provisions" of the FCA that require the whistleblower and the court to keep lawsuits confidential for at least 60 days. The plaintiffs argued that the requirements infringe the First Amendment rights of the public and the whistleblower, and that they violate the separation of powers, since courts are not free to release the documents until the executive branch acts. The government moved for dismissal, and the district court granted that motion in 2009. The plaintiffs appealed, and in 2011 their appeal was denied.

== U.S. ex rel. Clarissa Zafirov v. Florida Medical Associates ==
In September 2024, the U.S. District Court for the Middle District of Florida ruled that the FCA qui tam provision violates the Appointments Clause of Article II of the U.S. Constitution. Clarissa Zafirov filed a lawsuit under the FCA in May 2019, alleging her employer and other defendants committed Medicare fraud by misrepresenting patients' conditions to the federal government. The court dismissed Zafirov's case with prejudice, finding that qui tam relators act as self-appointed special prosecutors seeking damages for the federal government without proper appointment by the president, a department head, or a court. Zafirov and the Department of Justice have appealed the decision to the U.S. Court of Appeals for the Eleventh Circuit.

== Examples ==
In 2004, the billing groups associated with the University of Washington agreed to pay $35 million to resolve civil claims brought by whistleblower Mark Erickson, a former compliance officer, under the False Claims Act. The settlement, approved by the UW Board of Regents, resolved claims that they systematically overbilled Medicaid and Medicare and that employees destroyed documents to hide the practice. The fraud settlement, the largest against a teaching hospital since the University of Pennsylvania agreed to pay $30 million in 1995, ended a five-year investigation that resulted in guilty pleas from two prominent doctors. The whistleblower was awarded $7.25M.

In 2010, a subsidiary of Johnson & Johnson agreed to pay over $81 million in civil and criminal penalties to resolve allegations in a FCA suit filed by two whistleblowers. The suit alleged that Ortho-McNeil-Janssen Pharmaceuticals, Inc. (OMJPI) acted improperly concerning the marketing, promotion and sale of the anti-convulsant drug Topamax. Specifically, the suit alleged that OMJPI "illegally marketed Topamax by, among other things, promoting the sale and use of Topamax for a variety of psychiatric conditions other than those for which its use was approved by the Food and Drug Administration, (i.e., "off-label" uses)." It also states that "certain of these uses were not medically accepted indications for which State Medicaid programs provided coverage" and that as a result "OMJPI knowingly caused false or fraudulent claims for Topamax to be submitted to, or caused purchase by, certain federally funded healthcare programs.

In response to a complaint from whistleblower Jerry H. Brown II, the US Government filed suit against Maersk for overcharging for shipments to US forces fighting in Iraq and Afghanistan. In a settlement announced on 3 January 2012, the company agreed to pay $31.9 million in fines and interest, but made no admission of wrongdoing. Brown was entitled to $3.6 million of the settlement.

The largest healthcare fraud settlement in history was made by GlaxoSmithKline in 2012 when it paid a total of $3 billion to resolve four qui tam lawsuits brought under the False Claims Act and related criminal charges. The claims include allegations Glaxo engaged in off-label marketing and paid kickbacks to doctors to prescribe certain drugs, including Paxil, Wellbutrin and Advair.

In 2013, Wyeth Pharmaceuticals Inc., a pharmaceutical company acquired by Pfizer, Inc. in 2009, paid $490.9 million to resolve its criminal and civil liability arising from the unlawful marketing of its drug Rapamune for uses that were not FDA-approved and potentially harmful.

In 2014, CareFusion paid $40.1 million to settle allegations of violating the False Claims Act by promoting off label use of its products in the case United States ex rel. Kirk v. CareFusion et al., No. 10-2492. The government alleged that CareFusion promoted the sale of its drug ChloraPrep for uses that were not approved by the FDA. ChloraPrep is the commercial name under which CareFusion produced the drug chlorhexidine, used to clean the skin before surgery. In 2017, this case was called into question and was under review by the DOJ because the lead attorney for the DOJ serving as Assistant Attorney General in the case, Jeffery Wertkin, was arrested by the FBI on January 31, 2017, for allegedly attempting to sell a copy of a complaint in a secret whistleblower suit that was under seal.

In 2017, bio-pharmaceutical giant Celgene Corporation paid $240 million to settle allegations it sold and marketed its drugs Thalomid and Revlimid off-label in U.S. ex rel. Brown v. Celgene, CV 10-03165 (RK) (C.D. Cal.).

In 2021, A South Carolina pain management company was ordered to pay $140 million under the False Claims Act after a judge in U.S. district court found it in default after fraud schemes.

In 2026, Kaiser Permanente affiliates agreed to pay $556 million to settle allegations that the health care company overcharged the government by submitting invalid diagnosis codes for its Medicare Advantage patients. The settlement marked the largest False Claims Act settlement to date concerning Medicare Advantage plans.

== See also ==
- Making false statements
- Medicare Fraud
- Private attorney general
- War profiteering
