= 2024 term opinions of the Supreme Court of the United States =

October 2024 to October 2025 opinions

The 2024 term of the Supreme Court of the United States began on October 7, 2024 and concluded on October 5, 2025. The table below illustrates which opinion was filed by each justice in each case and which justices joined each opinion.

== Table key ==
- Delivered the court's opinion
- Joined the court's opinion
- Filed a concurrence
- Joined a concurrence
- Filed a dissent
- Joined a dissent
- Filed a concurrence/dissent
- Joined a concurrence/dissent
- Filed a statement
- Joined a statement
- Did not participate in the decision
- Decisions that do not note an argument date were decided without oral argument. Decisions that do not note a justice delivering the court's opinion are per curiam.
- Multiple concurrences and dissents within a case are numbered, with joining votes numbered accordingly. Justices frequently join multiple opinions in a single case; each vote is subdivided accordingly.
- An asterisk ( * ) in the court's opinion denotes that it was only a majority in part or a plurality. An asterisk in a joining vote denotes that the justice joined it only in part.
- A dash ( - ) denotes that the justice voted without filing or joining an opinion.

== 2024 term opinions ==
#	Case name and citation	Argued	Decided	Roberts	Thomas	Alito	Sotomayor	Kagan	Gorsuch	Kavanaugh	Barrett	Jackson
1	Hamm v. Smith, 604 U.S. 1		November 4, 2024		-				-			
2	Facebook, Inc. v. Amalgamated Bank, 604 U.S. 4	November 6, 2024	November 22, 2024									
3	Bouarfa v. Mayorkas, 604 U.S. 6	October 15, 2024	December 10, 2024									
4	NVIDIA v. E. Ohman J:or Fonder AB, 604 U.S. 20	November 13, 2024	December 11, 2024									
5	Royal Canin U. S. A., Inc. v. Wullschleger, 604 U.S. 22	October 7, 2024	January 15, 2025									
6	E.M.D. Sales, Inc. v. Carrera, 604 U.S. 45	November 5, 2024	January 15, 2025									
7	TikTok Inc. v. Garland, 604 U.S. 56	January 10, 2025	January 17, 2025				* 1		2			
8	Andrew v. White, 604 U.S. 86		January 21, 2025									
9	Wisconsin Bell, Inc. v. United States ex rel. Heath, 604 U.S. 115	November 4, 2024	February 21, 2025		1 2	1*				1 2		
10	Republic of Hungary v. Simon, 604 U.S. 140	December 3, 2024	February 21, 2025									
11	Williams v. Reed, 604 U.S. 168	October 7, 2024	February 21, 2025			*			*		*	
12	Lackey v. Stinnie, 604 U.S. 192	October 8, 2024	February 25, 2025									
13	Glossip v. Oklahoma, 604 U.S. 226	October 9, 2024	February 25, 2025								* *	
14	Waetzig v. Halliburton Energy Services, Inc., 604 U.S. 305	January 14, 2025	February 26, 2025									
15	Dewberry Group, Inc. v. Dewberry Engineers Inc., 604 U.S. 321	December 11, 2024	February 26, 2025									
16	City and County of San Francisco v. EPA, 604 U.S. 334	October 16, 2024	March 4, 2025				*	*	*		*	*
17	Bufkin v. Collins, 604 U.S. 369	October 16, 2024	March 5, 2025									
18	Thompson v. United States, 604 U.S. 408	January 14, 2025	March 21, 2025			1						2
19	Delligatti v. United States, 604 U.S. 423	November 12, 2024	March 21, 2025									
20	Bondi v. VanDerStok, 604 U.S. 458	October 8, 2024	March 26, 2025		1	2	1			2		3
21	United States v. Miller, 604 U.S. 518	December 2, 2024	March 26, 2025									
22	FDA v. Wages and White Lion Investments, L.L.C., 604 U.S. 542	December 2, 2024	April 2, 2025									
23	Medical Marijuana, Inc. v. Horn, 604 U.S. 593	October 15, 2024	April 2, 2025	2	1	2				2		
24	Department of Education v. California, 604 U.S. 650		April 4, 2025	-			2	1				2
25	Trump v. J. G. G., 604 U.S. 670		April 7, 2025				1	1			1*	1 2
26	Cunningham v. Cornell University, 604 U.S. 693	January 22, 2025	April 17, 2025									
27	Velazquez v. Bondi, 604 U.S. 712	November 12, 2024	April 22, 2025		1	1 2				1* 2 3	1* 3	
28	Advocate Christ Medical Center v. Kennedy, 605 U.S. 1	November 5, 2024	April 29, 2025									
29	Feliciano v. Department of Transportation, 605 U.S. 38	December 9, 2024	April 30, 2025									
30	Barnes v. Felix, 605 U.S. 73	January 22, 2025	May 15, 2025									
31	A.A.R.P. v. Trump, 605 U.S. 91		May 16, 2025									
32	Kousisis v. United States, 605 U.S. 114	December 9, 2024	May 22, 2025		1		2		3			
33	Oklahoma Statewide Charter School Board v. Drummond, 605 U.S. 165	April 30, 2025	May 22, 2025									
34	Seven County Infrastructure Coalition v. Eagle County, 605 U.S. 168	December 10, 2024	May 29, 2025									
35	BLOM Bank SAL v. Honickman, 605 U.S. 204	March 3, 2025	June 5, 2025									*
36	CC/Devas (Mauritius) Ltd. v. Antrix Corp. Ltd., 605 U.S. 223	March 3, 2025	June 5, 2025									
37	Catholic Charities Bureau, Inc. v. Wisconsin Labor & Industry Review Commission, 605 U.S. 238	March 31, 2025	June 5, 2025		1							2
38	Smith & Wesson Brands, Inc. v. Estados Unidos Mexicanos, 605 U.S. 280	March 4, 2025	June 5, 2025		1							2
39	Ames v. Ohio Department of Youth Services, 605 U.S. 303	February 26, 2025	June 5, 2025									
40	Laboratory Corp. of America Holdings v. Davis, 605 U.S. 327	April 29, 2025	June 5, 2025									
41	A. J. T. v. Osseo Area Schools, 605 U.S. 335	April 28, 2025	June 12, 2025		1		2			1		2
42	Soto v. United States, 605 U.S. 360	April 28, 2025	June 12, 2025									
43	Parrish v. United States, 605 U.S. 376	April 21, 2025	June 12, 2025									
44	Martin v. United States, 605 U.S. 395	April 29, 2025	June 12, 2025									
45	Commissioner v. Zuch, 605 U.S. 422	April 22, 2025	June 12, 2025									
46	Rivers v. Guerrero, 605 U.S. 443	March 31, 2025	June 12, 2025									
47	Perttu v. Richards, 605 U.S. 460	February 25, 2025	June 18, 2025									
48	United States v. Skrmetti, 605 U.S. 495	December 4, 2024	June 18, 2025		1 3	* 2	1	1* 2			3	1
49	Oklahoma v. EPA, 605 U.S. 609	March 25, 2025	June 18, 2025									
50	EPA v. Calumet Shreveport Refining, 605 U.S. 627	March 25, 2025	June 18, 2025									
51	NRC v. Texas, 605 U.S. 665	March 25, 2025	June 18, 2025									
52	Fuld v. Palestine Liberation Organization, 606 U.S. 1	April 1, 2025	June 20, 2025						*			
53	Stanley v. City of Sanford, 606 U.S. 46	January 13, 2025	June 20, 2025	*	*		* *			*	*	
54	Diamond Alternative Energy, LLC v. EPA, 606 U.S. 100	April 23, 2025	June 20, 2025				1					2
55	McLaughlin Chiropractic Associates, Inc. v. McKesson Corp., 606 U.S. 146	January 21, 2025	June 20, 2025									
56	Esteras v. United States, 606 U.S. 185	February 25, 2025	June 20, 2025				* 1					* 1 2
57	FDA v. R. J. Reynolds Vapor Co., 606 U.S. 226	January 21, 2025	June 20, 2025									
58	Riley v. Bondi, 606 U.S. 259	March 24, 2025	June 26, 2025				*	*	* *			*
59	Gutierrez v. Saenz, 606 U.S. 305	February 24, 2025	June 26, 2025		1 2	2			2		*	
60	Medina v. Planned Parenthood South Atlantic, 606 U.S. 357	April 2, 2025	June 26, 2025									
61	Hewitt v. United States, 606 U.S. 419	January 13, 2025	June 26, 2025	*					*			
62	Free Speech Coalition v. Paxton, 606 U.S. 461	January 15, 2025	June 27, 2025									
63	Mahmoud v. Taylor, 606 U.S. 522	April 22, 2025	June 27, 2025									
64	FCC v. Consumers' Research, 606 U.S. 656	March 26, 2025	June 27, 2025							1		2
65	Kennedy v. Braidwood Management, Inc., 606 U.S. 748	April 21, 2025	June 27, 2025									
66	Trump v. CASA, Inc., 606 U.S. 831	May 15, 2025	June 27, 2025		1 2	2	1	1	1	3		1 2
67	Goldey v. Fields, 606 U.S. 942		June 30, 2025									
#	Case name and citation	Argued	Decided	Roberts	Thomas	Alito	Sotomayor	Kagan	Gorsuch	Kavanaugh	Barrett	Jackson

== 2024 term membership and statistics ==
This was the twentieth term of Chief Justice Roberts's tenure and the third term with the current membership.

Justice		Appointment history		Agreement with judgment		Opinions filed				
Seniority	Name	President	Date confirmed	%	#					Total
Chief Justice	John Roberts	George W. Bush	September 29, 2005	95.5%	64/67	6	0	0	0	6
Associate Justice	Clarence Thomas	George H. W. Bush	October 15, 1991	77.6%	52/67	7	13	0	9	29
Associate Justice	Samuel Alito	George W. Bush	January 31, 2006	78.8%	52/66	6	5	0	6	17
Associate Justice	Sonia Sotomayor	Barack Obama	August 6, 2009	77.6%	52/67	6	9	1	6	22
Associate Justice	Elena Kagan	Barack Obama	August 7, 2010	83.6%	56/67	6	0	0	4	10
Associate Justice	Neil Gorsuch	Donald Trump	April 7, 2017	76.9%	50/65	6	4	0	7	17
Associate Justice	Brett Kavanaugh	Donald Trump	October 6, 2018	92.5%	62/67	7	7	0	2	16
Associate Justice	Amy Coney Barrett	Donald Trump	October 26, 2020	89.4%	59/66	7	2	1	3	13
Associate Justice	Ketanji Brown Jackson	Joe Biden	April 7, 2022	73.1%	49/67	5	9	0	10	24
Notes on statistics: Opinion counts only include the bench opinions listed above; opinions relating to orders or in-chambers opinions are not included.; Agreement with the Court's judgment does not guarantee agreement with the reasoning expressed in its opinion. A justice is not considered in agreement if they dissented even in part. Agreement percentages are based only on the listed cases in which a justice participated and are rounded to the nearest one-tenth of one percentage point.						Totals				
Notes on statistics: Opinion counts only include the bench opinions listed above; opinions relating to orders or in-chambers opinions are not included.; Agreement with the Court's judgment does not guarantee agreement with the reasoning expressed in its opinion. A justice is not considered in agreement if they dissented even in part. Agreement percentages are based only on the listed cases in which a justice participated and are rounded to the nearest one-tenth of one percentage point.						56	49	2	47	154
