= List of United States Supreme Court cases, volume 605 =

This is a list of all the United States Supreme Court cases from volume 605 of the United States Reports:

Note: As of December 2025, final bound volumes for the U.S. Supreme Court's United States Reports have been published through volume 585 (June 2018). Newer cases from subsequent future volumes do not yet have official page numbers and typically use three underscores in place of the page number; e.g., Example v. United States, 700 U.S. ___ (2050).

In recent years, the court has been committing to citation page numbers before publication of the bound volume. Those commitments can be viewed on their website.

Case name	Docket no.	Date decided
Advocate Christ Medical Center v. Kennedy	23–715	April 29, 2025
Medicare disproportionate share hospital adjustments should only consider patients as "entitled to supplementary security income benefits" if they received such benefits during the month in which they were hospitalized.
Feliciano v. Department of Transportation	23–861	April 30, 2025
American military reservists are entitled to differential pay whenever they are called to active duty during a national emergency, regardless of whether their service is substantially connected to the emergency.
Barnes v. Felix	23–1239	May 15, 2025
When evaluating excessive force claims, the inquiry into the reasonableness of police force requires analyzing the totality of the circumstances.
A.A.R.P. v. Trump	24A1007	May 16, 2025
United States government failed to provide adequate notice to detainees facing deportation under the Alien Enemies Act.
Kousisis v. United States	23–909	May 22, 2025
A defendant who induces a victim to enter into a transaction under materially false pretenses may be convicted of federal fraud even if the defendant did not seek to cause the victim economic loss.
Oklahoma Statewide Charter School Board v. Drummond	24–394	May 22, 2025
The judgment was affirmed by an equally-divided court.
Seven County Infrastructure Coalition v. Eagle County	23–975	May 29, 2025
The D.C. Circuit failed to afford the Surface Transportation Board the substantial judicial deference required in NEPA cases and incorrectly interpreted NEPA to require consideration of indirect environmental effects.
BLOM Bank SAL v. Honickman	23–1259	June 5, 2025
Relief under Rule 60(b)(6) requires extraordinary circumstances, and this standard does not become less demanding when the movant seeks to reopen a case to amend a complaint. A party must first satisfy Rule 60(b) before Rule 15(a)'s liberal amendment standard can apply.
CC/Devas (Mauritius) Ltd. v. Antrix Corp. Ltd.	23–1201	June 5, 2025
Plaintiffs suing a foreign state under the FSIA need not show “minimum contacts”; once an immunity exception applies and the state is properly served under 28 U.S.C. § 1330(b), personal jurisdiction is established.
Catholic Charities Bureau, Inc. v. Wisconsin Labor & Industry Review Commission	24–154	June 5, 2025
The Wisconsin Supreme Court's decision denying Catholic Charities Bureau a tax exemption available to religious entities under Wisconsin law, because it was not "operated primarily for religious purposes" as it neither engaged in proselytization nor limited its charitable services to Catholics, violated the First Amendment.
Smith & Wesson Brands, Inc. v. Estados Unidos Mexicanos	23–1141	June 5, 2025
Because Mexico’s complaint does not plausibly allege that the defendant gun manufacturers aided and abetted gun dealers’ unlawful sales of firearms to Mexican traffickers, PLCAA bars the lawsuit.
Ames v. Ohio Department of Youth Services	23–1039	June 5, 2025
Whether, in addition to pleading the other elements of Title VII, a majority-group plaintiff must show "background circumstances to support the suspicion that the defendant is that unusual employer who discriminates against the majority."
Laboratory Corp. of America Holdings v. Davis	24–304	June 5, 2025
Dismissed as improvidently granted.
A. J. T. v. Osseo Area Schools	24–249	June 12, 2025
Schoolchildren bringing ADA and Rehabilitation Act claims related to their education are subject to the same standards that apply in other disability discrimination contexts.
Soto v. United States	24–320	June 12, 2025
The combat-related special compensation (CRSC) statute confers authority to settle CRSC claims and thus displaces the Barring Act's settlement procedures and limitations period.
Parrish v. United States	24–275	June 12, 2025
A litigant who files a notice of appeal after the original appeal deadline but before the court grants reopening need not file a second notice after reopening. The original notice relates forward to the date reopening is granted.
Martin v. United States	24–362	June 12, 2025
(1) The law enforcement proviso overrides only the intentional-tort exception of the Federal Tort Claims Act, not the discretionary-function exception or other exceptions. (2) The Supremacy Clause does not afford the United States a defense in FTCA suits. (3) On remand, the Eleventh Circuit should consider whether the discretionary function exception bars either the plaintiffs' negligent- or intentional-tort claims.
Commissioner v. Zuch	24–416	June 12, 2025
The Tax Court lacks jurisdiction to resolve disputes between a taxpayer and the IRS when the IRS is no longer pursuing a levy.
Rivers v. Guerrero	23–1345	June 12, 2025
Once a district court enters its judgment with respect to a first-filed habeas petition, a second-in-time filing qualifies as a "second or successive application" properly subject to the requirements of §2244(b).
Perttu v. Richards	23–1324	June 18, 2025
Parties are entitled to a jury trial on Prison Litigation Reform Act exhaustion when that issue is intertwined with the merits of a claim.
United States v. Skrmetti	23–477	June 18, 2025
A law prohibiting medical treatments intended to provide gender-affirming care that does not align with a minor's gender assigned at birth does not discriminate based on sex or transgender status. It is not subject to heightened scrutiny under the Equal Protection Clause, and it satisfies rational basis review.
Oklahoma v. EPA	23–1067	June 18, 2025
Tennessee's law does not classify based on sex or transgender status. It satisfies rational basis review and is not subject to heightened scrutiny under the Equal Protection Clause.
EPA v. Calumet Shreveport Refining	23–1229	June 18, 2025
The EPA's denials of small refinery exemption petitions are locally or regionally applicable actions that fall within the "nationwide scope or effect" exception of the Clean Air Act, requiring venue in the D.C. Circuit.
NRC v. Texas	23–1300	June 18, 2025
Only parties to the NRC's licensing proceedings are entitled to obtain judicial review of the Commission's licensing decisions.

== See also ==
- List of United States Supreme Court cases by the Roberts Court
- 2024 term opinions of the Supreme Court of the United States
