= Lisa Blatt =

American lawyer (born 1965)

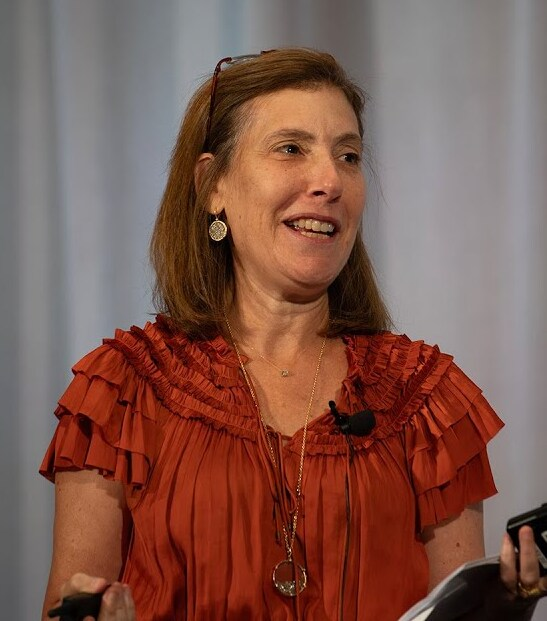
- Lisa Blatt speaking at the 2023 Ninth Circuit Judicial Conference
- Born: Lisa Carol Schiavo; 1964 or 1965 (age 60–61); San Angelo, Texas, U.S.
- Education: University of Texas at Austin (BA, JD)
- Spouse: David Blatt (m. 1995)

Lisa Schiavo Blatt (born 1965) is an American lawyer known for her advocacy before the Supreme Court of the United States. As of April 2026, she has argued before the Supreme Court 57 times—the most of any woman in U.S. history. Blatt is a partner at the law firm Williams & Connolly and chairs the firm's Supreme Court and appellate practice. She previously worked as an appellate lawyer for the U.S. government in the Office of the Solicitor General and later chaired the Supreme Court and appellate practice at the law firm Arnold & Porter. She has an 88.9% win rate, the highest of any repeat advocate before the Supreme Court.

== Early life and career ==
Blatt was born Lisa Carol Schiavo in San Angelo, Texas, to Dr. Lois Friedman, a psychologist and professor, and Dr. Luigi Schiavo, a software engineer. She grew up in Texas in San Angelo and Bryan–College Station. Blatt was inspired by Thurgood Marshall to pursue a career in law and began speech and debate in seventh grade. She graduated from the University of Texas at Austin in 1986 with a Bachelor of Arts, summa cum laude, and from the University of Texas School of Law in 1989 with a Juris Doctor, summa cum laude.

After law school, Blatt was a law clerk to then-Judge Ruth Bader Ginsburg of the U.S. Court of Appeals for the District of Columbia Circuit from 1989 to 1990. She then entered private practice in Washington, D.C. at Williams & Connolly. In 1993, she moved to the General Counsel's Office at the Department of Energy. From 1996 to 2009, she worked in the Office of the Solicitor General as an assistant to the solicitor general. She worked for the Federal Trade Commission for most of 2009 and then moved into private practice at Arnold & Porter, where she was a partner at the firm and chaired its Supreme Court and appellate practice. She returned to Williams & Connolly in 2019 as chair of its Supreme Court and appellate practice. Blatt is also an adjunct professor of law at Georgetown University, teaching classes on constitutional law and the separation of powers.

== Legal advocacy ==
Blatt has argued 57 cases before the Supreme Court, the most of any woman in U.S. history, winning in more than 88% of the cases decided as of April 2026. She has a distinctively blunt and informal style of speaking in court—for example, referring to the justices as "you guys". Writing for Law360, Gavin Broady called Blatt's approach to litigation "equal parts Sun Tzu and Vince Lombardi". Mark Sherman, writing for the Associated Press, said that she "elicits laughs and the occasional sharp response from the justices, who seem to enjoy Blatt's presentations as much as they respect her legal acumen". In one case, she told Justice Gorsuch that "you've not obviously read our expert", to which Gorsuch responded: "That is not fair. Come on!" In another instance, when Justice Jackson suggested a simpler legal test than either side was arguing for, Blatt said "I'm fine with you making up stuff."

In one exchange during oral argument in A.J.T. v. Osseo Area Schools (2025), she said that the way opposing counsel characterized her argument was "a lie and inaccurate," which led Justice Gorsuch to ask that she be "more careful with [her] words." She withdrew the comment during oral argument and later apologized to opposing counsel. Sarah Isgur, discussing the exchange on the podcast Advisory Opinions, said, “I can see exactly how this happened…She’s using normal words that normal people use, as she does so effectively.’”

During the COVID-19 pandemic, one of Blatt's cases was chosen to be the first remote oral argument in the Supreme Court's history. In that case, Patent and Trademark Office v. Booking.com B. V. (2020), Blatt argued against the United States Patent and Trademark Office's position that "Booking.com" was too generic to be a registrable trademark for a hotel-booking service because it was simply the generic term "booking" plus the top-level domain ".com". The Supreme Court ruled for Booking.com 8–1, saying that the formulation "generic.com" is not categorically too generic to be a trademark, and that the evidence showed that consumers did not consider "Booking.com" generic.

In Mahanoy Area School District v. B.L. (2021), Blatt represented a school district that had suspended a student from cheerleading for posting an image on Snapchat after school that said "fuck school fuck softball fuck cheer fuck everything". Blatt argued that schools have a special interest under Tinker v. Des Moines Independent Community School District (1969) in preventing speech that disrupts school activities—even, as here, when that speech takes place off campus. The court of appeals had ruled against the school district, holding that public schools have "no special license to regulate student speech occurring off campus". The Supreme Court partly disagreed with the court of appeals and said that schools can forbid some disruptive off-campus speech. However, it ruled 8–1 that the school's interest in preventing disruption did not, in this instance, outweigh the cheerleader's right to free expression under the First Amendment.

In Andy Warhol Foundation for the Visual Arts, Inc. v. Goldsmith (2023), Blatt represented photographer Lynn Goldsmith in a suit for copyright infringement of a photograph she took of Prince. Goldsmith licensed the photograph to Vanity Fair for use as a reference by Andy Warhol in creating an image to accompany an article about Prince in a 1984 issue of the magazine. Without Goldsmith's awareness, Warhol also used the photograph to create a series of paintings known as the Prince Series. In 2016, the Warhol Foundation licensed one of the paintings, Orange Prince, to Vanity Fair for use as the cover image for an issue commemorating Prince. Goldsmith sued the foundation for licensing it without her agreement. In an argument filled with examples drawing on pop culture, Blatt said in her opening statement: "If petitioner's test prevails, copyrights will be at the mercy of copycats. Anyone could turn Darth Vader into a hero or spin off All in the Family into The Jeffersons, without paying the creators a dime." The Supreme Court ruled for Goldsmith 7–2, saying that both images were used for "substantially the same purpose"—commercial licensing to magazines for depicting Prince—such that the purpose of the challenged use was not transformative and did not favor a claim of fair use.

In 2025, the US Justice Department dropped a lawsuit against Southwest Key Programs, a migrant child shelter that Blatt represents. Bloomberg reported that the decision to drop the suit, which alleged sexual abuse by the shelter's employees, followed an email from Blatt to the Department, in which Blatt suggested a discrepancy between the lawsuit and the administration's immigration policies.

== Public positions ==
Blatt has described herself as a liberal Democrat and feminist, and has said that she voted for Hillary Clinton in the 2016 presidential election and voted for Barack Obama twice. During the 2016 election day, when asked by Bloomberg Law who she voted for, how, and why, she said: "Duh! Clinton; early voting; and seriously?"

On August 2, 2018, Blatt endorsed then-Judge Brett Kavanaugh's nomination to the Supreme Court, touting him as "the most qualified conservative for the job" and as having an outstanding record of hiring women as law clerks. Blatt introduced Kavanaugh at his Senate confirmation hearing alongside former Secretary of State Condoleezza Rice and Ohio Senator Rob Portman. Blatt also criticized the Senate for not confirming then-Judge Merrick Garland to the Supreme Court. Maine Senator Susan Collins cited Blatt's remarks in announcing her vote to confirm Kavanaugh. Blatt's support for Kavanaugh led progressive activists to lobby President-elect Joe Biden not to nominate Blatt as U.S. Solicitor General.

Blatt has said that the legal profession is "overrun with men, and unless institutions like the Supreme Court do more to hire women, the upper echelons of my profession will never fully include women". In addition to structural barriers to inclusion, Blatt also pointed to a "war-like mentality" that is required for litigation and said that male litigators "generally are more fearless" than women even though many are "obviously clueless that they have no talent". Blatt has also advocated for more racial diversity in the pool of lawyers arguing before the Supreme Court. In 2022, Blatt said: "As far as I can tell, only two black men from private practice have argued since 2003 and one of them, the great John Payton[,] passed away 10 years ago. The other one, Luke McCloud, had not even argued in any courtroom before I got to Williams & Connolly. The numbers will not change unless we act instead of just talk." As of 2019, all three partners in her firm's Supreme Court and appellate practice area were women: Blatt, Sarah Harris, and Amy Saharia. American Lawyer has called this all-female practice "an anomaly among its peers".

== Personal life ==
Blatt is married to David Blatt, a fellow partner at Williams & Connolly who specializes in commercial litigation. Justice Ruth Bader Ginsburg officiated their wedding in 1995. Blatt's father-in-law, Sidney Blatt, was a noted psychologist at Yale University. Lisa and David Blatt have two children, who both attended Stanford Law School. Blatt's daughter Rachel is set to clerk for Justice Brett Kavanaugh for 2029. Lisa Blatt is Jewish.

== Supreme Court cases argued ==
Cases Blatt has argued before the Supreme Court include:

- T.M. v. University of Maryland Medical System Corp. (2026)
- Hunter v. United States (2026)
- Coney Island Auto Parts, Inc. v. Burton (2026)
- A.J.T. v. Osseo Area Schools (2025)
- E.M.D. Sales, Inc. v. Carrera (2025)
- Medical Marijuana, Inc. v. Horn (2025)
- United States v. Miller (2025)
- Cantero v. Bank of America, N.A. (2024)
- Gonzalez v. Trevino (2024)
- Snyder v. United States (2024)
- Starbucks Corp. v. McKinney (2024)
- Andy Warhol Foundation for the Visual Arts, Inc. v. Goldsmith (2023)
- Gonzalez v. Google LLC (2023)
- Jack Daniel's Properties, Inc. v. VIP Products LLC (2023)
- Turkiye Halk Bankasi A.S. v. United States (2023)
- Badgerow v. Walters (2022)
- Mahanoy Area School District v. B.L. (2021)
- Atlantic Richfield Co. v. Christian (2020)
- Romag Fasteners, Inc. v. Fossil, Inc. (2020)
- U.S. Patent and Trademark Office v. Booking.com B.V. (2020)
- BNSF Railway Co. v. Loos (2019)
- Carpenter v. Murphy (2019)
- Advocate Health Care Network v. Stapleton (2017)
- Bravo-Fernandez v. United States (2016)
- Adoptive Couple v. Baby Girl (2013)
- Marx v. General Revenue Corp. (2013)
- Tarrant Regional Water District v. Herrmann (2013)
- Astra USA v. Santa Clara County (2011)
- Henderson v. Shinseki (2011)
- AT&T Corp. v. Hulteen (2009)
- Crawford v. Nashville (2009)
- Gross v. FBL Financial Services, Inc. (2009)
- Engquist v. Oregon Department of Agriculture (2008)
- Gonzalez v. United States (2008)
- Marrama v. Citizens Bank of Massachusetts (2007)
- Lockhart v. United States (2006)
- Scheidler v. National Organization for Women, Inc. (2006)
- Bates v. Dow Agrosciences LLC (2005)
- Mayle v. Felix (2005)
- Stewart v. Dutra Construction Co. (2005)
- Lamie v. United States Trustee (2004)
- United States v. Flores-Montano (2004)
- Archer v. Warner (2003)
- Black & Decker Disability Plan v. Nord (2003)
- Breuer v. Jim's Concrete of Brevard, Inc. (2003)
- Bell v. Cone (2002)
- Chevron U.S.A., Inc. v. Echazabal (2002)
- Edelman v. Lynchburg College (2002)
- Texas v. Cobb (2001)
- Fischer v. United States (2000)
- New York v. Hill (2000)
- Hughes Aircraft Co. v. Jacobson (1999)
- Your Home Visiting Nurse Services, Inc. v. Shalala (1999)
- Bates v. United States (1998)
- Forney v. Apfel (1998)
- Regions Hospital v. Shalala (1998)
- Regents of the University of California v. Doe (1997)

== Publications ==
- Lisa S. Blatt, In Front of the Burgundy Curtain, 14 Green Bag 2d 9 (2010).
- Lisa Blatt, I’m a Liberal Feminist Lawyer. Here's Why Democrats Should Support Judge Kavanaugh, Politico Magazine (August 2, 2018).
- Lisa Blatt, Reflections of a Lady Lawyer, in Women & the Law 59 (2020) (joint publication of the top sixteen U.S. law reviews).
