= Medical Marijuana, Inc. v. Horn =

- Supreme Court of the United States

Argued October 15, 2024 Decided April 2, 2025
- Full case name: Medical Marijuana, Inc., et al., Petitioners v. Douglas J. Horn
- Docket no.: 23-365
- Citations: 604 U.S. 593 (more)
- Argument: Oral argument

Case history
- Prior: Partial judgment for defendants entered. Horn v. Medical Marijuana, Inc., No. 15-cv-701 (W.D.N.Y 2022).; Partial judgment reversed. 80 F.4th 130 (2d Cir. 2023).; Cert. granted sub nom Medical Marijuana, Inc. v. Horn, 601 U.S. ___ (2024).

Questions presented
- Whether economic harms resulting from personal injuries are injuries to "business or property by reason of" the defendant's acts for purposes of civil RICO.

Holding
- The RICO statute permits treble damages in lawsuits for business or property loss arising from a personal injury.

Court membership
- Chief Justice John Roberts Associate Justices Clarence Thomas · Samuel Alito; Sonia Sotomayor · Elena Kagan; Neil Gorsuch · Brett Kavanaugh; Amy Coney Barrett · Ketanji Brown Jackson

Case opinions
- Majority: Barrett, joined by Sotomayor, Kagan, Gorsuch, Jackson
- Concurrence: Jackson
- Dissent: Thomas
- Dissent: Kavanaugh, joined by Roberts, Alito

Laws applied
- Racketeer Influenced and Corrupt Organizations Act (18 U.S.C. § 1964)

Medical Marijuana, Inc. v. Horn, 604 U. S. 593 (2025), was a United States Supreme Court case holding that a clause of the Racketeer Influenced and Corrupt Organizations Act creating a private cause of action for "any person injured in his business or property" did not exempt claims originating from a personal injury.

== Background ==
In 2012, commercial truck driver Douglas Horn injured his hip and right shoulder in an automobile accident. Seeking alternative medications, Horn read a magazine advertisement that Medical Marijuana's Dixie X product offered THC-free pain relief. After failing his employer's drug test led to Horn losing his job, he paid for lab testing that proved Dixie X did contain THC.

Finding that Horn's lost earnings stemmed from the personal injury of his non-consensual ingestion of THC, the US District Court for the Western District of New York ruled in favor of Medical Marijuana that Horn was not "injured in his business or property" for the purposes of a claim under the Racketeer Influenced and Corrupt Organizations Act (RICO). On appeal, the US Court of Appeals for the Second Circuit reversed, holding that such RICO claims are not barred by whether they originate from a personal injury.

== Supreme Court ==
The Second Circuit's decision joined a circuit split between the Sixth, Seventh, and Eleventh Circuits rejecting such RICO claims and the Ninth Circuit allowing them. On October 3, 2023, Medical Marijuana petitioned the Supreme Court for review. On April 29, 2024, the Court granted certiorari. Oral arguments were heard on October 15. Lisa Blatt argued the cause for petitioners, and Easha Anand argued the cause for respondents.

On April 2, 2025, the Supreme Court decided the case, finding for Horn on narrow grounds. Justice Amy Coney Barrett's majority opinion declined to revisit the questions of whether Horn's injury was personal, whether his "business" encompassed his employment, or whether he had suffered an injury to his "property". The decision was instead premised on analyses of textual definitions, concluding that "'injured' means 'harmed'", and thus: "A plaintiff has been 'injured in his business or property' if his business or property has been harmed or damaged. [The RICO Act] requires nothing more."

Justice Ketanji Brown Jackson concurred briefly to emphasize that the RICO Act ought to be "'liberally construed to effectuate its remedial purposes'", as Congress instructed in §904(a) of the Organized Crime Control Act of 1970.

Justice Clarence Thomas, in dissent, would have dismissed the case as improvidently granted, because he felt the issues were not adequately briefed to resolve the fundamental questions presented. He would have left it to a lower court to decide whether a personal injury even existed. Justice Brett Kavanaugh, also dissenting and joined by justices John Roberts and Samuel Alito, would have excluded any personal injury, even if it resulted in a loss of business or property. (He emphasized a definitional distinction between an injury and a loss—the former being the infringement of a right, and the latter being the result of an injury.) Kavanaugh worried that to do otherwise would allow many traditional personal-injury tort suits to be federalized, but Barrett felt that the need to prove a pattern of racketeering and a direct relationship between conduct and injury would mitigate that concern.
