= National Environmental Policy Act =

United States federal environmental law (enacted 1970)

National Environmental Policy Act of 1969
- Long title: National Environmental Policy Act of 1969
- Acronyms (colloquial): NEPA
- Enacted by: the 91st United States Congress
- Effective: January 1, 1970

Citations
- Public law: Pub. L. 91–190
- Statutes at Large: 83 Stat. 852

Codification
- Titles amended: 42 U.S.C.: Public Health and Welfare
- U.S.C. sections created: 42 U.S.C. § 4321 et seq.

Legislative history
- Introduced in the Senate as S. 1075 by Henry M. Jackson (D–WA) on February 18, 1969; Committee consideration by Senate Committee on Interior and Insular Affairs; Passed the Senate on July 10, 1969 (Unanimous); Passed the House of Representatives on September 23, 1969 (372-15); Reported by the joint conference committee on December 17, 1969; agreed to by the Senate on December 20, 1969 and by the House of Representatives on December 23, 1969; Signed into law by President Richard Nixon on January 1, 1970

Major amendments
- Public Law 94-52, July 3, 1975; Public Law 94-83, Aug 9, 1975; Public Law 97-258, section 4(b), Sep 13, 1982; Public Law 118-5, June 3, 2023

United States Supreme Court cases
- United States v. SCRAP, 412 U.S. 669 (1973); Aberdeen & Rockfish R. Co. v. SCRAP, 422 U.S. 289 (1975); Flint Ridge Development Co. v. Scenic Rivers Assn. of Okla., 426 U.S. 776 (1976); Kleppe v. Sierra Club, 427 U.S. 390 (1976); Andrus v. Sierra Club, 442 U.S. 347 (1979); Strycker's Bay Neighborhood Council, Inc. v. Karlen, 444 U.S. 223 (1980); Weinberger v. Catholic Action of Haw./Peace Ed. Project, 454 U.S. 139 (1981); Metropolitan Edison Co. v. People Against Nuclear Energy, 460 U.S. 766 (1983); Baltimore Gas & Electric Co. v. Natural Resources Defense Council, Inc., 462 U.S. 87 (1983); Robertson v. Methow Valley Citizens Council, 490 U.S. 332 (1989); Marsh v. Oregon Natural Resources Council, 490 U.S. 360 (1989); Department of Transportation v. Public Citizen, 541 U.S. 752 (2004); Norton v. Southern Utah Wilderness Alliance, 542 U.S. 55 (2004); Winter v. Natural Resources Defense Council, 555 U.S. 7 (2008); Monsanto Co. v. Geertson Seed Farms, 561 U.S. 139 (2010); Seven County Infrastructure Coalition v. Eagle County, Colorado, No. 23-975, 604 U.S. ___ (2025)

The National Environmental Policy Act (NEPA) is a United States environmental law designed to promote the enhancement of the environment. It created new laws requiring U.S. federal government agencies to evaluate the environmental impacts of their actions and decisions, and it established the president's Council on Environmental Quality (CEQ). The act was passed by the U.S. Congress in December 1969 and signed into law by President Richard Nixon on January 1, 1970. More than 100 nations around the world have enacted national environmental policies modeled after NEPA.

NEPA requires federal agencies to evaluate the environmental effects of their actions. NEPA's most significant outcome was the requirement that all executive federal agencies prepare environmental assessments (EAs) and environmental impact statements (EISs). These reports state the potential environmental effects of proposed federal agency actions. Further, U.S. Congress recognizes that each person has a responsibility to preserve and enhance the environment as trustees for succeeding generations. NEPA's procedural requirements do not apply to the president, Congress, or the federal courts since they are not a "federal agency" by definition. However, a federal agency taking action under authority ordered by the president may be a final agency action subject to NEPA's procedural requirements.

== History ==
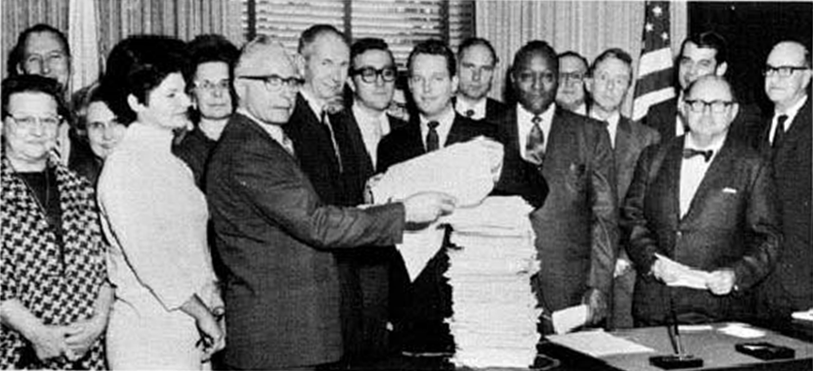
Statewide leaders of Concerned Citizens for Clean Air and Clean Water present signatures of 70,000 Illinoisans in 1969 to Attorney General William J. Scott. The petitions supported Scott's crackdown on polluters. Chairman Ed Ponder of Chicago presented the petitions.

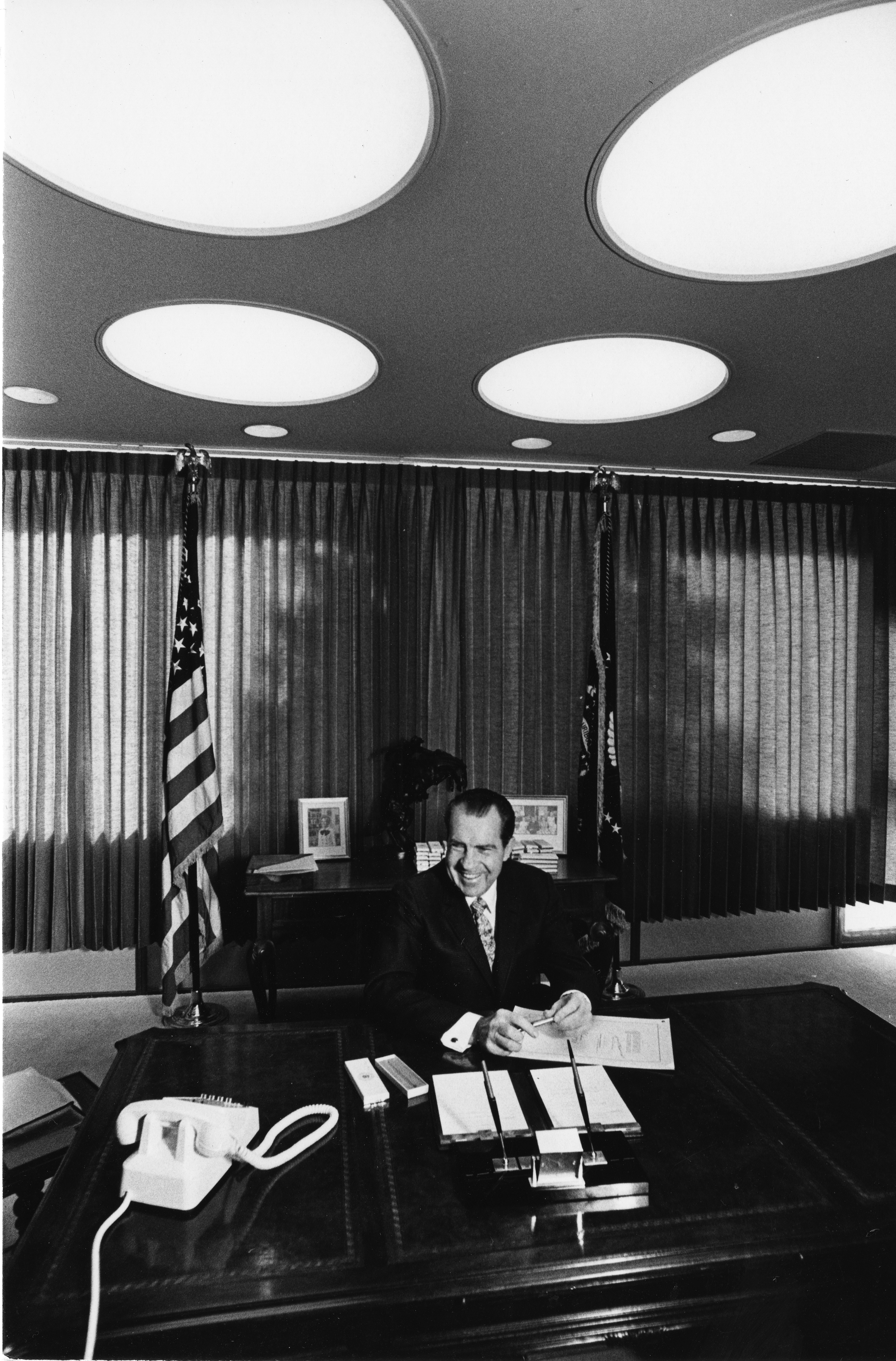
Richard Nixon signing NEPA on January 1, 1970

NEPA grew out of the increased public appreciation and concern for the environment that developed during the 1960s, amid increased industrialization, urban and suburban growth, and pollution across the United States. During this time, environmental interest group efforts and the growing public awareness resulting from Rachel Carson's 1962 book Silent Spring led to support for the 1964 Wilderness Act and subsequent legislation (including the 1970 Clean Air Act and 1972 Clean Water Act). The public outrage in reaction to the Santa Barbara oil spill in early 1969 occurred just as the NEPA legislation was being drafted in Congress. A fire on the Cuyahoga River was publicized in a Time magazine article shortly after the unanimous vote in the Senate. Another major driver for enacting NEPA were the 1960s highway revolts, a series of protests in many American cities that occurred in response to the bulldozing of many communities and ecosystems during the construction of the Interstate Highway System. In addition, as the contribution of Indiana political scientist Lynton Caldwell shows, concern for the environmental recklessness of international development programs in the 1950s and 1960s also drove the thinking behind NEPA.

In 2015 a United States District Court provided a documented concise background of NEPA being created to protect the environment from actions involving the Federal government as follows:

Following nearly a century of rapid economic expansion, population growth, industrialization, and urbanization, it had become clear by the late 1960s that American progress had an environmental cost. A congressional investigation into the matter yielded myriad evidence indicating a gross mismanagement of the country's environment and resources, most notably at the hands of the federal government. As a result, lawmakers and the general public alike called for an urgent and sweeping policy of environmental protection.

Congress answered these calls by enacting NEPA, which has served as "our basic national charter for protection of the environment" since 1970. With NEPA, Congress mandated that federal agencies take a "hard look" at the environmental consequences of their actions and to engage all practicable measures to prevent environmental harm when engaging in agency action. Furthermore, to remedy the widespread mistrust of the federal agencies, Congress incorporated within NEPA "action-forcing" provisions which require agencies to follow specific procedures in order to accomplish any federal project.

Since its passage, NEPA has been applied to any major project, whether on a federal, state, or local level, that involves federal funding, work performed by the federal government, or permits issued by a federal agency. Court decisions have expanded the requirement for NEPA-related environmental studies to include actions where permits issued by a federal agency are required regardless of whether federal funds are spent to implement the action, to include actions that are entirely funded and managed by private-sector entities where a federal permit is required. This legal interpretation is based on the rationale that obtaining a permit from a federal agency requires one or more federal employees (or contractors in some instances) to process and approve a permit application, inherently resulting in federal funds being expended to support the proposed action, even if no federal funds are directly allocated to finance the particular action.

A U.S. District Court describes the need for even the President to have the NEPA analysis information before making a decision as follows:

"No agency possesses discretion whether to comply with procedural requirements such as NEPA. The relevant information provided by a NEPA analysis needs to be available to the public and the people who play a role in the decision-making process. This process includes the President." "And Congress has not delegated to the President the decision as to the route of any pipeline."

== Contents ==
The preamble to NEPA reads:

To declare national policy which will encourage productive and enjoyable harmony between man and his environment; to promote efforts which will prevent or eliminate damage to the environment and biosphere and stimulate the health and welfare of man; to enrich the understanding of the ecological systems and natural resources important to the Nation; and to establish a Council on Environmental Quality.

NEPA contains three sections: the first section outlines national environmental policies and goals; the second establishes provisions for federal agencies to enforce such policies and goals; and the third establishes the CEQ in the Executive Office of the President.

The purpose of NEPA is to ensure that environmental factors are weighted equally when compared to other factors in the decision-making process undertaken by federal agencies and to establish a national environmental policy. The act also promotes the CEQ to advise the President in the preparation of an annual report on the progress of federal agencies in implementing NEPA. It also established the CEQ to advise the president on environmental policy and the state of the environment.

NEPA establishes this national environmental policy by requiring federal agencies to prepare an environmental impact statement to accompany reports and recommendations for Congressional funding. This impact statement is known as an EIS. NEPA is an action-forcing piece of legislation, meaning the act itself does not carry any criminal or civil sanctions, and therefore, all enforcement of NEPA must occur through the court system. In practice, a project is required to meet NEPA guidelines when a federal agency provides any portion of financing for the project. However, review of a project by a federal employee can be viewed as a federal action, and in such a case, it requires NEPA-compliant analysis performance.

NEPA covers a vast array of federal agency actions, but the act does not apply to state action where there is a complete absence of federal influence or funding. Exemptions and exclusions are also present within NEPA's guidelines, including specific federal projects detailed in legislation and EPA exemptions. Exemptions also apply when compliance with other environmental laws require an impact analysis similar to that mandated by NEPA. Such laws can include but are not limited to the Clean Air Act, Resource Conservation and Recovery Act, Safe Drinking Water Act, and the Federal Insecticide, Fungicide, and Rodenticide Act.

== Process ==
The NEPA process is the evaluation of the relevant environmental effects of a federal project or action mandated by NEPA. This process begins when an agency develops a proposal addressing a need to take action. If it is determined that the proposed action is covered under NEPA, there are three levels of analysis that a federal agency must undertake to comply with the law. These three levels include the preparation of a Categorical Exclusion (CatEx); an environmental assessment (EA); and either a Finding of No Significant Impact (FONSI), or, alternatively, the preparation and drafting of an environmental impact statement (EIS).

Executive Order No. 11514 (March 5, 1970; Nixon administration) as amended by Executive Order No. 11991 (May 24, 1977; Carter administration) directs the Council on Environmental Quality (CEQ) to issue "regulations to Federal agencies for the implementation of the procedural provisions of" NEPA and for Federal agencies to "comply with the regulations issued by the Council". Importantly the Supreme Court of the United States finds "that CEQ regulations are entitled to substantial deference." The Council on Environmental Quality's NEPA regulation 40 C.F.R. § 1501.4 specifies the process to determine whether to prepare an Environmental Impact Statement (EIS) as follows:

In determining whether to prepare an environmental impact statement the Federal agency shall:

(a) Determine under its procedures supplementing these regulations (described in § 1507.3) whether the proposal is one which:

(1) Normally requires an environmental impact statement, or
(2) Normally does not require either an environmental impact statement or an environmental assessment (categorical exclusion).

(b) If the proposed action is not covered by paragraph (a) of this section, prepare an environmental assessment (§ 1508.9). The agency shall involve environmental agencies, applicants, and the public, to the extent practicable, in preparing assessments required by § 1508.9(a)(1).

(c) Based on the environmental assessment make its determination whether to prepare an environmental impact statement.

(d) Commence the scoping process (§ 1501.7), if the agency will prepare an environmental impact statement.

(e) Prepare a finding of no significant impact (§ 1508.13), if the agency determines on the basis of the environmental assessment not to prepare a statement.

(1) The agency shall make the finding of no significant impact available to the affected public as specified in § 1506.6.
(2) In certain limited circumstances, which the agency may cover in its procedures under § 1507.3, the agency shall make the finding of no significant impact available for public review (including State and areawide clearinghouses) for 30 days before the agency makes its final determination whether to prepare an environmental impact statement and before the action may begin. The circumstances are:

(i) The proposed action is, or is closely similar to, one which normally requires the preparation of an environmental impact statement under the procedures adopted by the agency pursuant to § 1507.3, or
(ii) The nature of the proposed action is one without precedent.

In addition to complying with the Council on Environmental Quality's NEPA regulations in 40 C.F.R. § 1500 through § 1508, each Federal agency is required by 40 C.F.R. § 1507.3(a) to adopt supplemental procedures for their agency's implementation of NEPA. For example, the Federal Highway Administration's supplemental NEPA procedures are in 23 C.F.R. §771.101 through § 771.131. According to 23 C.F.R. § 771.115(a) Class I actions such as a new controlled access freeway or a highway project of four or more lanes on a new location significantly affect the environment and therefore require an Environmental Impact Statement. According to 23 C.F.R. § 771.115(b) and § 771.117(c) Class II actions such as construction of bicycle and pedestrian lanes, planning, noise barriers, and landscaping normally do not individually or cumulatively have a significant environmental effect and therefore may be categorically exempt unless there are unusual circumstances as provided in 23 C.F.R. § 771.117(b). According to 23 C.F.R. § 771.117(c) all other actions are Class III actions requiring the preparation of an Environmental Assessment to determine the appropriate environmental document required.

=== Preparation of a Categorical Exclusion ===
A Categorical Exclusion (CatEx) is a list of actions an agency has determined do not individually or cumulatively significantly affect the quality of the human environment (40 C.F.R. §1508.4). If a proposed action is included in an agency's CatEx, the agency must make sure that no extraordinary circumstances might cause the proposed action to affect the environment. Extraordinary circumstances include effects on endangered species, protected cultural sites, and wetlands. If the proposed action is not included in the description provided in the CatEx, an EA must be prepared. Actions similar to the proposed one may have been found to be environmentally neutral in previous EAs and their implementation, and so an agency may amend their implementing regulations to include the action as a CatEx. In this case, the drafted agency procedures are published in the Federal Register and a public comment period is required. An agency cannot rely on a CatEx prepared by a different agency to support a decision not to prepare an EA or EIS for a planned action; however, it may draw from another agency's experience with a comparable CatEx in seeking to substantiate a CatEx of its own.

The Council on Environmental Quality (CEQ) created Categorical Exclusions to reduce paperwork (40 CFR § 1500.4(p)) and reduce delay (40 CFR § 1500.5(k)) so agencies can better concentrate on actions that do have significant effects on the human environment. In 2003 the National Environmental Policy Task Force found agencies "indicated some confusion about the level of analysis and documentation required to use an approved categorical exclusion". In 2010 CEQ issued guidance on the existing regulations for Categorical Exclusions consistent with NEPA and past CEQ guidance. This CEQ 2010 guidance acknowledges, "Since Federal agencies began using categorical exclusions in the late 1970s, the number and scope of categorically excluded activities have expanded significantly. Today, categorical exclusions are the most frequently employed method of complying with NEPA, underscoring the need for this guidance on the promulgation and use of categorical exclusions." This CEQ 2010 guidance goes on to caution, "If used inappropriately, categorical exclusions can thwart NEPA's environmental stewardship goals, by compromising the quality and transparency of agency environmental review and decisionmaking, as well as compromising the opportunity for meaningful public participation and review." Indeed, the expanded use of Categorical Exclusions undermines NEPA by reducing environmental analysis and public comment, thereby increasing NEPA litigation. The CEQ 2010 guidance emphasizes that Categorical Exclusions must capture the entire proposed action and not be used for a segment or an interdependent part of a larger proposed action. Examples of Exceptional Circumstances that prevent use of Categorical Exclusions include where there are "potential effects on protected species or habitat, or on historic properties listed or eligible for listing in the National Register of Historic Places." The CEQ specifically cites the 2010 Deepwater Horizon oil spill as an example why agencies need to periodically review their Categorical Exclusions "in light of evolving or changing conditions that might present new or different environmental impacts or risks."

Streamlining the NEPA process with categorical exclusions have been criticized, for example allowing BP's exploration plan that resulted in the Deepwater Horizon oil spill to use a categorical exclusion instead of requiring an Environmental Impact Statement.

=== Preparation of an Environmental Assessment and a Finding of No Significant Impact ===
EAs are concise public documents that include the need for a proposal, a list of alternatives, and a list of agencies and persons consulted in the proposal's drafting. The purpose of an EA is to determine the significance of the proposal's environmental outcomes and to look at alternatives of achieving the agency's objectives. An EA is supposed to provide sufficient evidence and analysis for determining whether to prepare an EIS, aid an agency's compliance with NEPA when no EIS is necessary, and it facilitates preparing an EIS when one is necessary.

Most agency procedures do not require public involvement prior to finalizing an EA document; however, agencies advise that a public comment period is considered at the draft EA stage. EAs need to be of sufficient length to ensure that the underlying decision to prepare an EIS is legitimate, but they should not attempt to substitute an EIS.

However, the Council on Environmental Quality regulation 40 C.F.R. § 1500.1(b) states: "NEPA procedures must insure that environmental information is available to public officials and citizens before decisions are made and before actions are taken." Likewise, 40 C.F.R. § 1500.2 states: "Federal agencies shall to the fullest extent possible: ... (d) Encourage and facilitate public involvement in decisions which affect the quality of the human environment." A U.S. District Court describes the essential requirement for public input on a draft EA as follows:

The Ninth Circuit has read these regulations to mean that "the public must be given an opportunity to comment on draft EAs and EISs." Anderson v. Evans, 371 F.3d 475, 487 (9th Cir.2004). Because the regulations "must mean something," the Circuit has held that an agency's failure to obtain any public input on a draft EA "violates these regulations." Citizens for Better Forestry v. U.S. Dept. of Agriculture, 341 F.3d 961, 970 (9th Cir.2003).

If no substantial effects on the environment are found after investigation and the drafting of an EA, the agency must produce a Finding of No Significant Impact (FONSI). This document explains why an action will not have a significant effect on the human environment and includes the EA or a summary of the EA that supports the FONSI determination.

=== Preparation of an Environmental Impact Statement ===
If it is determined that a proposed federal action does not fall within a designated CatEx or does not qualify for a FONSI, then the responsible agency must prepare an EIS. The purpose of an EIS is to help public officials make informed decisions based on the relevant environmental consequences and the alternatives available. The drafting of an EIS includes public party, outside party, and other federal agency input concerning its preparation. These groups subsequently comment on the draft EIS.

An EIS is required to describe the environmental impacts of the proposed action, any adverse environmental impacts that cannot be avoided should the proposal be implemented, the reasonable alternatives to the proposed action, the relationship between local short-term uses of man's environment along with the maintenance and enhancement of long-term productivity, and any irreversible and irretrievable commitments of resources that would be involved in the proposed action.

An agency may undertake the drafting of an EIS without the initial drafting of the EA. This may happen if the agency believes that the action will have a significant impact on the human or natural environment or if the action is considered an environmentally controversial issue.

The responsible decision-maker is required to review the final EIS before reaching a final decision regarding the course of action to be taken. The decision-maker must weigh the potential environmental impacts along with other pertinent considerations in reaching the final decision. A record of decision (ROD) is issued which records the agency's final decision.

=== Average time for a full review ===
A federal study from 2013–2018 found that a full NEPA review took an average of 4.5 years.

== Mootness doctrine used to evade NEPA requirements ==
The Administrative Procedure Act at 5 U.S.C. § 702 provides the right for a person injured by a NEPA issue to carry out a NEPA case in court as:

A person suffering legal wrong because of agency action, or adversely affected or aggrieved by agency action within the meaning of a relevant statute, is entitled to judicial review thereof.

By 5 U.S.C. § 706 the U.S. Congress provides for courts to make equitable remedies such as an injunction to compel agency action withheld or to set aside agency actions that are arbitrary, capricious, an abuse of discretion, or otherwise not in accordance with law. However, a court case becomes moot when no practical ("live") issues remain as stated in Powell v. McCormack, 395 U. S. 486 (1969) pages 496 – 497:

Simply stated, a case is moot when the issues presented are no longer "live" or the parties lack a legally cognizable interest in the outcome. See E. Borchard, Declaratory 497*497 Judgments 35-37 (2d ed. 1941). Where one of the several issues presented becomes moot, the remaining live issues supply the constitutional requirement of a case or controversy. See United Public Workers v. Mitchell, 330 U. S. 75, 86-94 (1947); 6A J. Moore, Federal Practice ¶ 57.13 (2d ed. 1966).

In early NEPA cases (for example Arlington Coalition on Transportation v. Volpe, 458 F.2d 1323 (4th Cir. 1972) page 1331) courts determined that projects were beyond the reach of the courts (moot) if that project had progressed to the point that the costs of altering the project would outweigh the benefits. Nevertheless, by 1981 the Ninth Circuit Court of Appeals recognized that some projects might proceed with construction in an attempt to evade the requirements of NEPA. Therefore, the court cautioned that even completed projects could be ordered to be removed, as stated in Columbia Basin Land Protection Assoc. v. Schlesinger, 643 F.2d 585 (9th Cir.1981) page 591 note 1:

The building of the towers has not made the case hypothetical or abstract—the towers still cross the fields of the Landowners, continually obstructing their irrigation systems—and this Court has the power to decide if they may stay or if they may have to be removed. * * * If the fact that the towers are built and operating were enough to make the case nonjusticiable, as the dissent states, then the BPA (and all similar entities) could merely ignore the requirements of NEPA, build its structures before a case gets to court, and then hide behind the mootness doctrine. Such a result is not acceptable.

Thus, courts have the equitable power to prevent those who use bad faith construction to evade U.S. Congress policies such as NEPA. Despite a court recognizing the use of this mootness tactic, a court still might not order removal of construction and remediation of the environment unless the NEPA complaint seeks removal and remediation in the request for relief as a "live" issue, see dissenting opinion in West v. Secretary of Dept. of Transp., 206 F.3d 920 (9th Cir. 2000) page 931:

He did not seek remediation; he wanted the interchange stopped. It was built. Therefore, there is no justiciable controversy pertaining to Phase I.

If stopping construction is the only request for relief in a NEPA complaint then logically construction cannot be stopped after completion.

The 1st Circuit Court of Appeals in stopping construction of a seaport on Sears Island, Maine pointed out that harm in NEPA cases is harm to the environment as stated in Sierra Club v. Marsh, 872 F.2d 497 (1st Cir. 1989) at page 500:

Thus, when a decision to which NEPA obligations attach is made without the informed environmental consideration that NEPA requires, the harm that NEPA intends to prevent has been suffered. * * * the harm at stake is a harm to the environment, but the harm consists of the added risk to the environment that takes place when governmental decisionmakers make up their minds without having before them an analysis (with prior public comment) of the likely effects of their decision upon the environment.

This court in Sierra Club v. Marsh on page 504 also found since there is an instinct not to tear down projects, it is appropriate to issue preliminary injunctions early in NEPA cases:

The way that harm arises may well have to do with the psychology of decisionmakers, and perhaps a more deeply rooted human psychological instinct not to tear down projects once they are built. But the risk implied by a violation of NEPA is that real environmental harm will occur through inadequate foresight and deliberation. The difficulty of stopping a bureaucratic steam roller, once started, still seems to us, after reading Village of Gambell, a perfectly proper factor for a district court to take into account in assessing that risk, on a motion for a preliminary injunction.

To have Article III standing to maintain a federal court case at least one individual plaintiff must have an injury caused by the defendant and that injury is likely to be remedied by a favorable decision as stated in Lujan v. Defenders of Wildlife, 504 U.S. 555, 112 S. Ct. 2130, 119 L. Ed. 2d 351 (1992) on pages 560–561:

Over the years, our cases have established that the irreducible constitutional minimum of standing contains three elements. First, the plaintiff must have suffered an "injury in fact"—an invasion of a legally protected interest which is (a) concrete and particularized, see id., at 756; Warth v. Seldin, 422 U. S. 490, 508 (1975); Sierra Club v. Morton, 405 U. S. 727, 740-741, n. 16 (1972);[1] and (b) "actual or imminent, not 'conjectural' or 'hypothetical,'" Whitmore, supra, at 155 (quoting Los Angeles v. Lyons, 461 U. S. 95, 102 (1983)). Second, there must be a causal connection between the injury and the conduct complained of—the injury has to be "fairly ... trace[able] to the challenged action of the defendant, and not ... th[e] result [of] the independent action of some third party not before the court." Simon v. Eastern Ky. Welfare 561*561 Rights Organization, 426 U. S. 26, 41-42 (1976). Third, it must be "likely," as opposed to merely "speculative," that the injury will be "redressed by a favorable decision." Id., at 38, 43.

To have a "live" issue after completion of construction of a project, at least one person would need to show they will personally suffer harm from existence of the completed project and that the harm can be remedied by removal of the project as in Columbia Basin Land Protection Assoc. v. Schlesinger. Individual injuries in NEPA cases may likely involve growth-inducing impacts such as air, noise, and water pollution, safety considerations, secondary impacts, and cumulative impacts; for example see Coalition for Canyon Preservation v. Bowers, 632 F.2d 774 (9th Cir. 1980). Proving individual injury prevents disqualification by an objection of "generalized grievance" as stated in Juliana v. US, 217 F. Supp. 3d 1224 (D. Or. 2016):

Standing alone, "the fact that a harm is widely shared does not necessarily render it a generalized grievance." Jewel, 673 F.3d at 909; see also Massachusetts v. EPA, 549 U.S. 497, 517 (2007) ("[I]t does not matter how many persons have been injured by the challenged action" so long as "the party bringing suit shows that the action injures him in a concrete and personal way." (quotation marks omitted and alterations normalized)); Akins, 524 U.S. at 24 ("[A]n injury. ... widely shared ... does not, by itself, automatically disqualify an interest for Article III purposes.

In determining whether a Federal court has the authority to decide a case (jurisdiction), Federal courts only consider the parts of a complaint supporting the federal issue cited. This is referred to as the "well-pleaded" complaint rule. Parts of a complaint requesting removal of anticipated construction can be ignored by Federal courts since construction was not an actual controversy at the time the complaint was filed. Therefore, if project construction starts after a NEPA complaint is filed, the NEPA complaint will need to be amended or a new complaint filed to include the actual construction. Otherwise after construction is completed, a Federal court may find it no longer has authority (jurisdiction) to decide the case. The case would therefore be moot.

Courts balance the harm an injunction might cause to the defendant against the likelihood of environmental harms occurring and the degree of injury if the environmental harms occur. The U.S. Supreme Court pointed out the irreparable nature of environmental injuries in Amoco Production Co. v. Gambell, 480 U.S. 531, 107 S. Ct. 1396, 94 L. Ed. 2d 542 (1987) on page 545:

Environmental injury, by its nature, can seldom be adequately remedied by money damages and is often permanent or at least of long duration, i. e., irreparable. If such injury is sufficiently likely, therefore, the balance of harms will usually favor the issuance of an injunction to protect the environment.

Courts may discount the defendant's self-inflicted harm if construction was started before resolution of the environmental issues as in Davis v. Mineta, 302 F.3d 1104 (10th Cir. 2002) on page 1116:

We must next balance the irreparable harms we have identified against the harm to defendants if the preliminary injunction is granted. Defendants allege that significant financial penalties will be incurred by UDOT if the Project is delayed. * * * However, it appears that many of these costs may be self-inflicted. As we have previously concluded, the state entities involved in this case have "jumped the gun" on the environmental issues by entering into contractual obligations that anticipated a pro forma result. In this sense, the state defendants are largely responsible for their own harm.

Columbia Basin Land Protection Assoc. v. Schlesinger identified that allowing construction to moot NEPA cases frustrates the U.S. Congress intent. Therefore, In order to prevent NEPA cases from automatically becoming moot due to construction, NEPA complaints would need to request removal of bad faith constructions.

== Council on Environmental Quality ==
The Council on Environmental Quality (CEQ) was modeled on the Council of Economic Advisers, an executive branch group created by the Employment Act of 1946 to advise the President on economic matters. Shortly after the CEQ was created by NEPA, President Richard Nixon expanded its mandate in executive order 11514. He directed the CEQ to issue guidelines for the proper preparation of an EIS and to assemble and coordinate federal programs related to environmental quality. The council was placed within the Executive Office of the President of the United States. It is composed of three members appointed by the president and subsequently confirmed by the Senate.

The CEQ has played a key part in the development of the EIS process. Its initial guidelines issued in 1971 required each federal department and agency to adopt its own guidelines consistent with those established by CEQ. These guidelines did not carry the status of formal agency regulations, but were often treated with similar deference in the court of law. In 1977 President Jimmy Carter by executive order 11991 authorized the CEQ to adopt regulations rather than simple guidelines on EIS preparation. However, the CEQ still had no authority to enforce these regulations.

The CEQ has prepared advisory documentation in the last several years explaining the general structure of NEPA and the nature of cumulative impacts, among other advisories. The CEQ also maintains a Citizen's Guide to NEPA website as part of its ongoing duties. CEQ regulations call for agencies and other federal actors to integrate NEPA requirements with other planning obligations as early as possible in the process. This is to ensure that all decisions are influenced by and reflective of environmental values. It also avoids potential delays and conflicts that could arise from imposing these requirements later in the rule-making process. Section 102(2)(C), which is NEPA's action-forcing provision, stipulates that with "every recommendation or report on proposals for legislation and other major Federal actions significantly affecting the quality of the human environment", all federal agencies shall include "a detailed statement by the responsible official ... on the environmental impact of the proposed action". This statement must specify all the details required for the EIS.

== Consequences for violating the National Environmental Policy Act ==
Agencies that violate NEPA may suffer harms to their reputations that can jeopardize future funding opportunities. Because the CEQ does not have enforcement authority for their guidelines, alleged violations must generally go through the judicial system. These lawsuits can further harm the agencies by demanding money and resources from the federal government, and delay projects for years. Several large projects have been shut down or cancelled as a result of such delays, like the planned Keystone XL Pipeline. The expansion was abandoned by TC Energy in 2021 after delays including the rejection of its review under NEPA, in the case Indigenous Environmental Network v. U.S. Department of State. The most common consequence imposed by courts for violations of NEPA is a mandated repeat of whichever environmental review or report was found to have been insufficient.

== National Environmental Policy Act and environmental justice ==
The National Environmental Policy Act can affect environmental justice in different ways. It can promote environmental justice by requiring federal agencies to include minority and low-income populations in their NEPA-mandated environmental analyses. Executive Order #12898 (Feb. 11, 1994; Clinton administration) requires federal agencies that are complying with NEPA to consider environmental effects on human health, and economic and social effects, specifically within minority and low-income populations, which are disproportionately impacted by environmental detriment. Proposed federal actions must address "significant and adverse environmental effects" on minority and low-income populations.

It can also get in the way of environmental justice: In New York, congestion pricing is predicted to improve air quality, mass transit ridership, and bus service. However, it took four years to finish an environmental assessment of several thousand pages for the NEPA process, and the project was further delayed by litigation asserting that the environmental assessment was not sufficient. A wind farm meant to be built on Cape Cod was cancelled after sixteen years of NEPA-related litigation. Various transmission lines necessary to transition to clean energy have been cancelled due to NEPA-related litigation, as well as the Calico Solar project in the Mojave desert.

== Recent developments ==
'President Trump Announces Proposed National Environmental Policy Act Regulations' - video from White House, January 9, 2020

On August 15, 2017, President Donald Trump issued Executive Order (E.O.) 13807, "Establishing Discipline and Accountability in the Environmental Review and Permitting Process for Infrastructure Projects." This executive order directs CEQ to use its "authority to interpret NEPA to simplify and accelerate the NEPA review process", requires agencies to "establish procedures for a regular review and update of categorical exclusions", and revokes President Obama's Executive Order 13690 addressing Flood Risk Management by including science on climate change.

In July 2020, the Trump administration CEQ moved to significantly weaken the law by issuing a final rule that limited the duration of EAs to one year and EISs to two years. The rule also exempted a number of projects from review entirely and prevented the consideration of cumulative environmental impacts, including those caused by climate change. Later, the Biden administration CEQ issued two changes to restore regulatory provisions that were in effect prior to the first Trump administration: Phase 1 Final Rule (April 20, 2022) and Phase 2 Final Rule (May 1, 2024).

In 2025, the second Trump administration directed the CEQ to rescind all rules it had made implementing the NEPA since 1977. Defenders of the move argued this would streamline permitting, while environmental and animal welfare groups argued that it would reduce the "public’s ability to fully raise concerns about the destruction of wildlife habitat and loss of biodiversity, declines in air and water quality, and harm to public health."

A lawsuit over the proposed Uinta Basin Rail, which would transport crude oil from wells to ports and refineries, resulted in a Supreme Court hearing over the NEPA act, following a lower circuit ruling against Uinta Basin Rail. The Supreme Court issued an opinion on Seven County Infrastructure Coalition v. Eagle County on May 29, 2025. In an 8 to 0 ruling (with one judge abstaining) the court declared the lower court had incorrectly interpreted NEPA. Justice Brett Kavanaugh delivered the opinion of the court stating the purpose of NEPA was to provide a "purely procedural statute (which) simply requires an agency to prepare an EIS." In a concurring statement Justice Sonia Sotomayor stated that "the Surface Transportation Board would not be responsible for the harms caused by the oil industry" while arguing the Supreme Court's ruling followed established precedent. A reaction to the court opinion from law professor Richard Lazarus stated the court's opinion significantly changes the interpretation of NEPA: "Right or wrong, that's not been the NEPA law for 50 years."

== Analysis of effects ==
There is limited evidence on the costs and benefits of NEPA. According to a 2025 review, "On the cost side, environmental review has become considerably lengthier in recent decades, and at least some infrastructure costs have greatly increased since the passage of NEPA, though evidence of causality remains elusive. On the benefits side, while case studies suggest that NEPA has curbed some of the worst abuses, more systematic data on benefits are scanty."

== See also ==
- 1970 in the environment
- Climate justice
- Environmental impact assessment
- Environmental impact report
- Environmental policy of the United States
- United States energy law
