= Oklahoma v. EPA =

Oklahoma v. Environmental Protection Agency
- Supreme Court of the United States

Argued March 25, 2025 Decided June 18, 2025
- Full case name: Oklahoma, et al. v. Environmental Protection Agency, et al.
- Docket no.: 23-1067
- Citations: 605 U.S. 609 (more) 145 S.Ct. 1720
- Argument: Oral argument
- Decision: Opinion

Holding
- EPA disapprovals of state implementation plans under the Clean Air Act are locally or regionally applicable actions, not national ones, so challenges to them should be heard in regional circuits.

Court membership
- Chief Justice John Roberts Associate Justices Clarence Thomas · Samuel Alito; Sonia Sotomayor · Elena Kagan; Neil Gorsuch · Brett Kavanaugh; Amy Coney Barrett · Ketanji Brown Jackson

Case opinions
- Majority: Thomas, joined by Sotomayor, Kagan, Kavanaugh, Barrett and Jackson
- Concurrence: Gorsuch (in judgment), joined by Roberts
- Alito took no part in the consideration or decision of the case.

Laws applied
- Clean Air Act

Oklahoma v. Environmental Protection Agency, 605 U.S. 609 (2025), was a case before the Supreme Court of the United States that addressed where lawsuits challenging certain EPA actions must be filed. The Court held that when the EPA disapproves a state implementation plan (SIP) under the Clean Air Act, that decision is a local or regional action, not a national one. As a result, challenges must be brought in the appropriate regional federal appeals courts, rather than exclusively in the D.C. Circuit.

== Background ==
In 2015, the EPA updated the National Ambient Air Quality Standards (NAAQS) for ozone. Under the Clean Air Act, each state was required to submit a plan explaining how it would meet the new standards.

The EPA rejected 21 of these state plans, including those from Oklahoma and Utah. The agency said legal challenges could only be heard in the D.C. Circuit. Several states, mostly Republican-led, disputed this interpretation and filed lawsuits in other regional courts.

== Decision ==
In a unanimous decision, the Court rejected the EPA’s position. The justices held that each EPA disapproval of a state’s plan is a separate, discrete action under Section 7607(b)(1) of the Clean Air Act. Because these actions are locally or regionally applicable, challenges must be filed in the corresponding regional courts of appeals.

The Court noted that the EPA had made a similar argument in EPA v. Calumet Shreveport Refining (2025), which the justices had already rejected earlier that day.
