= Omnibus Appropriations Act, 2009 =

United States law

- Long title: Making omnibus appropriations for the fiscal year ending September 30, 2009, and for other purposes.
- Enacted by: the 111th United States Congress
- Effective: March 11, 2009

Citations
- Public law: 111.8

Legislative history
- Introduced in the House of Representatives as H.R. 1105 by Dave Obey (D–WI) on February 23, 2009; Committee consideration by House Committee on Appropriations, House Committee on the Budget; Passed the House of Representatives on February 25, 2009 (245-178); Passed the Senate on March 10, 2009 (voice vote); Signed into law by President Barack Obama on March 11, 2009

Major amendments
- Credit CARD Act of 2009

United States Supreme Court cases
- Feliciano v. Department of Transportation, 604 U.S. ____ (2025)

The Omnibus Appropriations Act, 2009 (H.R. 1105, Pub. L. 111–8 (text) (PDF)) is an Act for the United States government that combines bills funding the operations of each of the Cabinet departments, except Defense, Homeland Security, and Veteran Affairs into a single appropriation bill. It was signed into law by President Barack Obama on March 11, 2009.

== House version ==
The House of Representatives version of the bill includes $410 billion in spending. This includes a 21 percent increase to a program that feeds infants and poor women, an 8 percent increase to the Section 8 voucher program, a 13 percent increase to the Agriculture Department, a 10 percent increase in Amtrak subsidies, a 10 percent increase in Congress's budget, a 12 percent increase in the Department of State budget and foreign aid, and eliminated spending for the Millennium Challenge Corporation.

The watchdog group Taxpayers for Common Sense identified over 8,500 earmarks totaling $7.7 billion (1.9% of the bill's total), including $22 million for the John F. Kennedy Library, dozens of grants to assist states and counties prevent the spread of methamphetamine use, and $200,000 for the removal of tattoos from gang members.

The bill passed the House by a vote of 245-178 (including 16 Republicans) and the Senate 62-35 (including 8 Republicans).

== Embryonic stem cell research ==
An amendment to the bill bans federal funding of "research in which a human embryo or embryos are destroyed, discarded, or knowingly subjected to risk of injury or death." Two days prior to signing the bill, Obama had lifted a ban on federal funding of such research.
