= Seven County Infrastructure Coalition v. Eagle County =

United States Supreme Court case

Seven County Infrastructure Coalition v. Eagle County, Colorado
- Supreme Court of the United States

Argued December 10, 2024 Decided May 29, 2025
- Full case name: Seven County Infrastructure Coalition, et al., Petitioners v. Eagle County, Colorado, et al.
- Docket no.: 23-975
- Citations: 605 U.S. 168 (more)
- Argument: Oral argument
- Decision: Opinion

Questions presented
- Does NEPA require agencies to study the indirect environmental impact of the actions they regulate?

Holding
- The D.C. Circuit failed to afford the Surface Transportation Board the substantial judicial deference required in NEPA cases and incorrectly interpreted NEPA to require consideration of indirect environmental effects.

Court membership
- Chief Justice John Roberts Associate Justices Clarence Thomas · Samuel Alito; Sonia Sotomayor · Elena Kagan; Neil Gorsuch · Brett Kavanaugh; Amy Coney Barrett · Ketanji Brown Jackson

Case opinions
- Majority: Kavanaugh, joined by Roberts, Thomas, Alito, Barrett
- Concurrence: Sotomayor, joined by Kagan, Jackson
- Gorsuch took no part in the consideration or decision of the case.

Laws applied
- National Environmental Policy Act (49 U.S.C. § 10901)

Seven County Infrastructure Coalition v. Eagle County, 605 U.S. 168 (2025), is a United States Supreme Court case holding that the National Environmental Policy Act only requires the environmental impact statements of government agencies to consider impacts that they have regulatory power over. Courts must defer to agencies on whether upstream and downstream industrial activity is within the scope of a project's approval.

== Background ==
In 2020, the Seven County Infrastructure Coalition applied for approval of the 88-mile Uinta Basin Rail project to transport crude oil from the Uinta Basin to ports and refineries. The Surface Transportation Board prepared a 3,600-page environmental impact statement through public comment, ultimately determining that the transportation and economic benefits outweighed those environmental concerns.

In August 2023, the United States Court of Appeals for the District of Columbia Circuit invalidated that approval, finding that the environmental review overlooked impacts on wildlife, environmental damage from oil spills, and increased crude oil refining. The Seven County Infrastructure Coalition appealed the D.C. Circuit's ruling to the Supreme Court, arguing that such downstream aspects of the project were not within the Surface Transportation Board's regulatory authority. United States Solicitor General Elizabeth Prelogar recommended that the court deny certiorari, but it was granted in June 2024.

In December 2024, Associate Justice Neil Gorsuch recused himself from the case after ethics groups and Democratic lawmakers highlighted that the Seven County Infrastructure Coalition's position aligned with the financial interests of Philip Anschutz. Anschutz owns oil wells in portions of Utah that would be served by the Uinta Basin Rail project and one of his companies filed an amicus brief raising this interest. Anschutz had lobbied Colorado Senator Wayne Allard to support Gorsuch's 2006 nomination to the United States Court of Appeals for the Tenth Circuit after Gorsuch represented Anschutz's companies during the early 2000s.

== Supreme Court ==
Writing for the majority, Associate Justice Brett Kavanaugh reversed the D.C. Circuit and remanded the case for further proceedings. Kavanaugh opined that because environmental impact statements rely on fact-dependent, context-specific, and policy-laden choices, courts should provide government agencies with substantial deference. Noting that the Fiscal Responsibility Act of 2023 required these statements to be completed within two years and 150 pages, Kavanaugh reasoned that Congress wants to streamline NEPA analysis.

=== Concurrence ===
Concurring in the judgement, Associate Justice Sonia Sotomayor felt that the Supreme Court could have simply supported the Surface Transportation Board's claim that Department of Transportation v. Public Citizen (2004) already held that agencies do not need to analyze impacts that they are unable to prevent under their organic statute.

== Reaction ==
Environmental law professor Richard Lazarus criticized Kavanaugh for claiming that analysis of upstream and downstream effects reduces infrastructure development and associated construction jobs without citing data to support that claim. Journalist Ian Millhiser described the majority as embracing supply-side progressivism, popularly known as the "Abundance Agenda". Surface Transportation Board chairman Patrick Fuchs praised the ruling, stating a belief NEPA had been previously abused for ideological purposes.
