= Barnes v. Felix =

United States Supreme Court case

- Supreme Court of the United States

Argued January 22, 2025 Decided May 15, 2025
- Full case name: Janice Hughes Barnes, Individually and as Representative of the Estate of Ashtian Barnes, Deceased v. Roberto Felix, Jr., et al.
- Docket no.: 23-1239
- Citations: 605 U.S. 73 (more)
- Argument: Oral argument
- Decision: Opinion

Questions presented
- Whether courts should apply the moment of the threat doctrine when evaluating an excessive force claim under the Fourth Amendment.

Holding
- When evaluating excessive force claims, the inquiry into the reasonableness of police force requires analyzing the totality of the circumstances.

Court membership
- Chief Justice John Roberts Associate Justices Clarence Thomas · Samuel Alito; Sonia Sotomayor · Elena Kagan; Neil Gorsuch · Brett Kavanaugh; Amy Coney Barrett · Ketanji Brown Jackson

Case opinions
- Majority: Kagan, joined by unanimous
- Concurrence: Kavanaugh, joined by Thomas, Alito, Barrett

Laws applied
- U.S. Const. amend IV

Barnes v. Felix, 605 U.S. 73 (2025), is a United States Supreme Court case that reaffirmed the "totality of the circumstances" test for evaluating excessive force claims under the Fourth Amendment, previously established in Tennessee v. Garner (1985). Writing for a unanimous court, Associate Justice Elena Kagan rejected a "moment of the threat" test, used by some of the Circuit Courts, as excessively narrow within the scope of the Fourth Amendment.

== Background ==
=== Case background ===
At 2:45 p.m. on April 28, 2016, 24-year-old Black man Ashtian Barnes was driving a rented silver Toyota Corolla on the Sam Houston Tollway in Houston, Texas when he was pulled over by Roberto Felix Jr., a traffic enforcement officer from Harris County, due to an unpaid toll connected to the car. Barnes did not know about the unpaid tolls on the rental car.

When asked, Barnes could not show a driver's license nor proof of insurance. He told Felix that it may be in the trunk of the car. Barnes opened the trunk without getting out of the car, turned off the car engine and removed the keys from the ignition. Felix later claimed to have smelled marijuana, which is illegal for recreational use in Texas. No trace of drugs were ever found in the car nor on Barnes. After the shooting, a firearm was recovered from the glove compartment of the car.

Felix ordered Barnes to exit the vehicle and pulled out his gun. Barnes opened the driver's side door, without exiting the vehicle, and the car's ignition turned on. Felix pointed his gun at Barnes, shouted "don't fucking move", and stepped onto the car's door sill as it began to move forward with the door still open. Felix fired two shots. Barnes was pronounced dead at the scene. Felix had been a police officer since 2004 and was involved in another fatal shooting in 2007. He was not disciplined for Barnes' killing.

The Houston Police Department, which is separate from the constable's office that employed Felix, and the Harris County District Attorney's Office investigated the shooting. On August 31, 2016, a 12-person grand jury declined to bring charges against Felix in the death of Barnes. Later that day, a Black Lives Matter protest attended by Barnes' mother and father took place outside the Harris County 180th Criminal Court. On that same day, dashcam video of the stop was released.

Barnes' mother, Janice Hughes Barnes, brought an excessive force claim against Felix on her son's behalf. The Fifth Circuit dismissed her claim, citing its "moment-of-threat" doctrine. The "moment-of-threat" doctrine evaluates Fourth Amendment violations only within the context of the narrow window when the officer's safety is allegedly threatened, excluding the events that precede it. As Texas is within the Fifth Circuit, the District Court and Fifth Circuit Court of Appeals rejected Barnes' excessive force claim under the moment-of-threat doctrine, which limited the court's inquiry to the two second timeframe from when the car began moving with Felix in its door sill to the shooting. Both the district court judge and the appeals court had misgivings about the "very narrow approach to deadly force claims". Janice Barnes subsequently appealed to the Supreme Court.

=== Prior case law ===
In 1985 the Court said in Tennessee v. Garner that "the use of deadly force to prevent the escape of all felony suspects, whatever the circumstances, is constitutionally unreasonable." In Graham v. Connor (1989), Chief Justice William Rehnquist confirmed that the "totality of circumstances" should be evaluated from "the perspective of a reasonable officer on the scene, rather than with the 20/20 vision of hindsight". The Graham decision reaffirmed that excessive force determinations "must embody allowance for the fact that police officers are often forced to make split-second judgements". The three Graham factors have since then required, at a minimum, consideration of the severity of the crime, the immediate threat to the officer, and whether the suspect is actively resisting or evading arrest.

Most circuit courts applied the totality factors established by Supreme Court precedents from the 1980s. The moment of threat doctrine was used by a minority of circuit courts, and not by the Supreme Court itself. The Supreme Court granted certiorari to resolve the circuit split.

== Supreme Court ==
Oral arguments were heard on January 22, 2025. The court issued its decision on May 15, 2025.

=== Question presented ===
Whether courts should apply the moment of the threat doctrine when evaluating an excessive force claim under the Fourth Amendment.

=== Majority opinion ===
Writing for a unanimous court, Associate Justice Elena Kagan rejected the Fifth Circuit's "moment-of-threat" doctrine as too narrow. Courts must consider "all the relevant circumstances" to evaluate whether an officer's use of force is reasonable. The moment of threat doctrine would have excluded from consideration the seriousness of the underlying reason for the stop, which in this case was a trivial unpaid toll. The seriousness of the crime is one of the Graham factors for evaluating whether a use of force was objectively reasonable. Justice Kagan said a court "can not review the totality of the circumstances if it has put on chronological blinders."

The decision is limited to expanding the narrow timeframe of the moment of threat doctrine. The Court's decision did not answer any open questions about officer-created jeopardy.

The Court remanded the case with instructions to consider a longer timeframe under the totality of circumstances to determine the reasonableness of the shooting. The Supreme Court declined to analyze whether an officer's creation of a threat to themselves reduces the reasonableness of their force because it was not addressed by the lower courts.

=== Concurrence ===
Associate Justice Brett Kavanaugh wrote a concurring opinion joined by Justices Clarence Thomas, Samuel Alito, and Amy Coney Barrett. When a court considers that traffic stops are highly dangerous for police officers, and evasion suggests "that the driver is preparing to commit or has committed a more serious crime", the use of force may still be found to have been reasonable even if the moment of threat doctrine were not applied.

== See also ==
- 2024 term opinions of the Supreme Court of the United States
- Circuit split
