= Commissioner v. Zuch =

- Supreme Court of the United States

Decided June 12, 2025
- Full case name: Commissioner v. Zuch
- Docket no.: 24-416
- Citations: 605 U.S. 422 (more)

Holding
- The Tax Court lacks jurisdiction to resolve disputes between a taxpayer and the IRS when the IRS is no longer pursuing a levy.

Court membership
- Chief Justice John Roberts Associate Justices Clarence Thomas · Samuel Alito; Sonia Sotomayor · Elena Kagan; Neil Gorsuch · Brett Kavanaugh; Amy Coney Barrett · Ketanji Brown Jackson

Case opinions
- Majority: Barrett
- Dissent: Gorsuch

Laws applied
- 26 U.S.C. § 6331

Commissioner v. Zuch, 605 U.S. 422 (2025), was a United States Supreme Court case in which the court held that the United States Tax Court lacks jurisdiction to resolve disputes between a taxpayer and the Internal Revenue Service (IRS) when the IRS is no longer pursuing a levy.
