= Smith & Wesson Brands, Inc. v. Mexico =

Smith & Wesson v. Mexico
- Supreme Court of the United States

Argued March 4, 2025 Decided June 5, 2025
- Full case name: Smith & Wesson Brands, Inc., Barrett Firearms Manufacturing, Inc., Beretta U.S.A. Corp, Glock, Inc., Sturm, Ruger & Company, Inc., Witmer Public Safety Group, Inc., d/b/a Interstate Arms, Century International Arms, Inc., and Colt’s Manufacturing Company, LLC v. Estados Unidos Mexicanos
- Docket no.: 23-1141
- Argument: Oral argument
- Decision: Opinion

Case history
- Prior: Certiorari to the United States Court of Appeals for the First Circuit, Mexico v. Smith & Wesson

Questions presented
- 1. Whether production/sale of firearms in the US is the "proximate cause" of alleged injuries to the Mexican government from violence committed by Mexican drug cartels.; 2. Whether the production/sale of firearms in the United States amounts to "aiding and abetting" illegal arms trafficking because firearms companies allegedly know that some of their products are unlawfully trafficked.

Holding
- Because Mexico’s complaint does not plausibly allege that the defendant gun manufacturers aided and abetted gun dealers’ unlawful sales of firearms to Mexican traffickers, PLCAA bars the lawsuit.

Court membership
- Chief Justice John Roberts Associate Justices Clarence Thomas · Samuel Alito; Sonia Sotomayor · Elena Kagan; Neil Gorsuch · Brett Kavanaugh; Amy Coney Barrett · Ketanji Brown Jackson

Case opinions
- Majority: Kagan, joined by unanimous
- Concurrence: Thomas
- Concurrence: Jackson

Laws applied
- Protection of Lawful Commerce in Arms Act

Smith & Wesson Brands, Inc. v. Estados Unidos Mexicanos, 605 U.S. 280 (2025), is a United States Supreme Court case in which the Court determined that domestic firearm manufacturers cannot be sued by foreign states, if not materially causing the importation of weapons, under the Protection of Lawful Commerce in Arms Act. The case had been accepted by the court in late 2024.

== Lower court history ==
In 2021, Mexico sued seven firearms manufacturers, including Smith & Wesson, Beretta, and Colt's Manufacturing Company, alleging that the companies have exacerbated the Mexican drug war. The US District Court for the District of Massachusetts dismissed the case, but the Court of Appeals for the First Circuit sided with the Mexican government on appeal.

== Supreme Court ==
On October 4, 2024, the Supreme Court of the United States granted certiorari to review the First Circuit's decision. On March 4, 2025, the Supreme Court heard oral arguments with the justices largely agreeing with Noel Francisco's advocacy against holding firearms manufacturers liable for the criminal misuse of their products by downstream users. On June 5, 2025, the Court issued a unanimous 9-0 decision that Mexico failed to make a plausible allegation of liability under the predicate exception of PLCAA, and that Mexico's suit closely resembled the exact type of lawsuit the statute was enacted to prevent.
