= Medical Marijuana, Inc. =

Holding company

- Company type: Public
- Traded as: OTC Pink: MJNA
- Industry: Dietary supplements and consumer products
- Headquarters: San Diego, California, U.S.
- Website: medicalmarijuanainc.com

Medical Marijuana, Inc. (traded over the counter as MJNA) is a holding company with subsidiaries that make and sell a range of hemp-based products.

== History ==
The company operated at a loss for 2011 and 2012, and made money for the first time in 2013 on the basis of a single contract signed by one of its subsidiaries. In 2013, MMI and CannaVEST, an exchange-traded fund, each invested in a company called Kannalife Sciences Inc. Kannalife was founded to commercialize inventions made at the NIH concerning methods to use cannabidiol as a neuroprotectant. As of 2016, Kannalife was working on novel analogs of CBD that are more drug-like than CBD.

In the fall of 2014, the company filed a lawsuit against Project CBD and Stewart Environmental Labs to dispute a report of “significant levels of toxic solvents” in the hemp oil offered by one of their subsidiaries. Stewart Environmental settled with the company, but Project CBD filed an anti-SLAPP motion in May 2015.

In 2014, MMI reported that it was under investigation by the SEC; the Financial Industry Regulatory Authority warned investors that year about penny stock scams in the marijuana industry. In 2015 a report in Forbes laid out relationships among CannaVEST, money taken in by the real estate Ponzi scheme run by Llamas, Stuart Titus and the private equity firm General Hemp that he ran, and one of MMI's subsidiaries called PhytoSphere.

In 2015 the company hired Titus as CEO after having an interim CEO since Llamas' departure. At that time, the company did most of its business through a subsidiary called HempMedsPX, which marketed and sold products from other MMI subsidiaries. As of 2015 the company sourced the hemp oil used in its products from a facility in Denmark. Its then-most prominent product was called "Real Scientific Hemp Oil", sold at around $169 per 3 grams, and was marketed as a dietary supplement. It also sold a range of other consumer products, such as hemp-based shampoo.

In 2021, the company replaced Titus with Blake Schroeder as Chairman of the Board and named him Chief Executive Officer and President. Schroeder also fills a dual role as Chief Executive Officer at Kannaway, LLC, an MJNA portfolio company.
