= Velazquez v. Bondi =

2025 US Supreme Court case

- Supreme Court of the United States

Argued November 12, 2024 Decided April 22, 2025
- Full case name: Hugo Abisai Monsalvo Velazquez v. Pamela Bondi
- Docket no.: 23-929
- Argument: Oral argument

Case history
- Prior: Monsalvo Velazquez v. Garland, 88 F.4th 1301 (10th Cir. 2023)

Court membership
- Chief Justice John Roberts Associate Justices Clarence Thomas · Samuel Alito; Sonia Sotomayor · Elena Kagan; Neil Gorsuch · Brett Kavanaugh; Amy Coney Barrett · Ketanji Brown Jackson

Case opinions
- Majority: Gorsuch, joined by Roberts, Sotomayor, Kagan, and Jackson
- Dissent: Thomas, joined by Alito; Kavanaugh and Barrett (Parts I and II)
- Dissent: Alito, joined by Kavanaugh
- Dissent: Barrett, joined by Kavanaugh

Laws applied
- Illegal Immigration Reform and Immigrant Responsibility Act of 1996 (8 U.S.C. § 1229c and 8 U.S.C. § 1252)

Velazquez v. Bondi, 604 U.S. 712, is a United States Supreme Court case holding that voluntary departure deadlines that end on a weekend or public holiday are automatically extended to the following business day for the purposes of filing a post-decision motion to reopen or reconsider immigration removal proceedings.

== Background ==
Under 8 U.S.C. § 1229c(b) of the Illegal Immigration Reform and Immigrant Responsibility Act of 1996 (IIRIRA), the Attorney General can permit an alien of good moral character to voluntarily depart from the United States within 60 days of an adverse decision in immigration removal hearings. If the non-citizen fails to depart during that period, they are fined and barred from applying from immigration relief, such as cancelling their removal, for ten years. However, these penalties do not apply if the alien files a motion to reconsider their immigration proceedings within the 60-day period.

In 2005, Hugo Abisai Monsalvo Velazquez, a citizen of Mexico, illegally entered the United States. In 2011, the US Department of Homeland Security initiated removal proceedings against him. In March 2019, an immigration judge denied Velazquez's attempt at withholding of removal under the United Nations Convention Against Torture, but he was granted a 60-day voluntary departure period.

In October 2021, the Board of Immigration Appeals (BIA) dismissed Velazquez's April 2019 appeal of the immigration judge's decision, restarting the 60-day voluntary departure period. When Velazquez filed a December 2021 motion to reopen his proceedings based on the Supreme Court's April 2021 ruling in Niz-Chavez v. Garland, it was rejected by the BIA because the 60-day period had already ended. Whereas the Executive Office for Immigration Review automatically extends filing deadlines that end on a weekend or public holiday to the following business day, the BIA distinguishes voluntary departure as an action that is equally possible to conduct on weekdays, weekends, and holidays.

In December 2023, the Court of Appeals for the Tenth Circuit denied Velazquez's appeal, applying Skidmore deference to the BIA's persuasive interpretation of the statutory deadline. This decision created a circuit split from the Ninth Circuit's 2012 ruling in Meza-Vallejos v. Holder. Whereas the Ninth Circuit reasoned that the voluntary departure period must end on a day that the BIA was capable of receiving motions to reopen proceedings, the Tenth Circuit focused on how extensions violate a textualist interpretation of the statutory deadline.

== Supreme Court ==
=== Oral arguments ===
During oral arguments held on November 12, 2024, Associate Justice Samuel Alito appeared to align with the Tenth Circuit's view, while Justice Sonia Sotomayor advocated for the Ninth Circuit's perspective. In its reply to Velazquez's appeal of the voluntary departure deadline, the Department of Justice raised a new argument that federal courts do not have jurisdiction to hear an appeal of a denial to reopen proceedings. This new dispute led Justice Kavanaugh to advocate for remanding the case back to the Tenth Circuit to address this jurisdictional dispute.

=== Decision ===
Writing for the majority, Associate Justice Neil Gorsuch rejected the government's argument that federal courts lack jurisdiction over a denial to reopen proceedings. The Supreme Court held that IIRIRA grants broad judicial review over all questions of law arising from a final order of removal, and it reasoned that voluntary departure deadlines on weekends or holidays extend to the next business day under 8 U.S.C. § 1229c.

In dissent, Associate Justice Samuel Alito argued that prior immigration regulations using this specialized meaning of "day" were irrelevant for statutory interpretation, but Gorsuch rebutted that per Haig v. Agee (1981), such evidence can identify the "longstanding administrative construction." Alito further distinguished procedural and substantive deadlines, but the majority rejected that framework as untethered from IIRIRA's statutory text.

Associate Justice Clarence Thomas wrote a dissenting opinion arguing that judicial review over questions of law arising from a final order of removal should be narrow. Associate Justice Amy Coney Barrett agreed that the Supreme Court lacked jurisdiction but only because the denial of a motion to reconsider a denial of a motion to reopen removal proceedings is far removed from the final order of removal.

== See also ==
- Nasrallah v. Barr
