= Feliciano v. Department of Transportation =

2025 US Supreme Court case

- Supreme Court of the United States

Argued December 9, 2024 Decided April 30, 2025
- Full case name: Nick Feliciano v. Department of Transportation
- Docket no.: 23-861
- Citations: 605 U.S. 38 (more)
- Argument: Oral argument
- Decision: Opinion

Court membership
- Chief Justice John Roberts Associate Justices Clarence Thomas · Samuel Alito; Sonia Sotomayor · Elena Kagan; Neil Gorsuch · Brett Kavanaugh; Amy Coney Barrett · Ketanji Brown Jackson

Case opinions
- Majority: Gorsuch, joined by Roberts, Sotomayor, Kavanaugh, and Barrett
- Dissent: Thomas, joined by Alito, Kagan, and Jackson

Laws applied
- 5 U.S.C. § 5538, 10 U.S.C. § 101, and 10 U.S.C. § 12301

Feliciano v. Department of Transportation, 605 U.S. 38 (2025), is a United States Supreme Court case holding that American military reservists are entitled to differential pay whenever they are called to active duty during a national emergency, regardless of whether their service is substantially connected to the emergency.

== Background ==
Aside from the active personnel of the United States Armed Forces, the United States maintains seven reserve components. The 2009 Omnibus Appropriations Act required the federal government to compensate reservists for the difference between their military and civilian pay when calling them to active duty "during a national emergency," among other situations.

In 2012, Nick Feliciano was called from his civilian work as an air traffic controller with the Federal Aviation Administration to support the Coast Guard Reserve by escorting ships to and from harbor during Operations Iraqi Freedom and Enduring Freedom. After his claim for differential pay was denied by the Merit Systems Protection Board and Court of Appeals for the Federal Circuit, Feliciano appealed to the Supreme Court.

== Supreme Court ==
Writing for the majority, Associate Justice Neil Gorsuch held that reservists called to active duty during a national emergency do not need to prove that their service was substantively connected to the emergency. In United States v. Ressam (2008), the Supreme Court previously held that in statutory interpretation, "during" ordinarily denotes a temporal link. Gorsuch further highlighted the difficulty of sufficiently relating one's service to a national emergency, given that all reservists ultimately support the American military.

=== Dissent ===
Associate Justice Clarence Thomas wrote a dissenting opinion warning that other portions of Title 10 of the US Code refer to "contingency operations" with the expectation of use in circumstances related to a national emergency, rather than solely during such events. The majority responded that the doctrine of constitutional avoidance would allow courts to limit excessive application of military law.

Thomas argued that because there has only been one year without national emergencies since 1933, this decision will near-constantly entitle reservists to differential pay. Gorsuch rebutted that textualism demands adherence to the natural reading unless absurd.
