= Parrish v. United States =

- Supreme Court of the United States

Decided June 12, 2025
- Full case name: Parrish v. United States
- Docket no.: 24-275
- Citations: 605 U.S. 376 (more)

Holding
- A litigant who files a notice of appeal after the original appeal deadline but before the court grants reopening need not file a second notice after reopening. The original notice relates forward to the date reopening is granted.

Court membership
- Chief Justice John Roberts Associate Justices Clarence Thomas · Samuel Alito; Sonia Sotomayor · Elena Kagan; Neil Gorsuch · Brett Kavanaugh; Amy Coney Barrett · Ketanji Brown Jackson

Case opinions
- Majority: Sotomayor, joined by Roberts, Alito, Kagan, Kavanaugh, Barrett
- Concurrence: Jackson (in judgment), joined by Thomas
- Dissent: Gorsuch

Parrish v. United States, 605 U.S. 376 (2025), was a United States Supreme Court case in which the court held that a litigant who files a notice of appeal after the original appeal deadline but before the court grants reopening need not file a second notice after reopening. The original notice relates forward to the date reopening is granted.

== Background ==
Donte Parrish, a person incarcerated in a federal prison, alleged that he was placed in restrictive segregated confinement for 23 months based on his suspected involvement in another inmate’s death. After a hearing officer cleared him of wrongdoing, Parrish filed suit in a federal district court seeking damages for his time in segregated confinement. The district court dismissed his case on March 23, 2020, holding that some claims were untimely and others unexhausted. When the court’s order reached the federal prison two weeks later, Parrish was no longer there because he had been transferred to a different facility. Parrish received the dismissal order three months after it was issued and promptly filed a notice of appeal, explaining his delayed receipt. The Fourth Circuit recognized that Parrish’s notice of appeal came well after the 60-day appeal period for suits against the United States, so it construed Parrish’s filing as a motion to reopen the time to appeal under 28 U.S.C. § 2107(c). On remand, the district court granted reopening for 14 days. Parrish did not file a second notice of appeal. Although both Parrish and the United States argued that the original notice of appeal was sufficient, the Fourth Circuit held that Parrish’s failure to file a new notice of appeal within the reopened appeal period deprived the court of jurisdiction.
