= Advocate Christ Medical Center v. Kennedy =

2025 US Supreme Court case

- Supreme Court of the United States

Argued November 5, 2024 Decided April 29, 2025
- Full case name: Advocate Christ Medical Center et al. v. Robert F. Kennedy Jr., Secretary of Health and Human Services
- Docket no.: 23-715
- Citations: 605 U.S. 1 (more)
- Argument: Oral argument
- Decision: Opinion

Court membership
- Chief Justice John Roberts Associate Justices Clarence Thomas · Samuel Alito; Sonia Sotomayor · Elena Kagan; Neil Gorsuch · Brett Kavanaugh; Amy Coney Barrett · Ketanji Brown Jackson

Case opinions
- Majority: Barrett, joined by Roberts, Thomas, Alito, Kagan, Gorsuch, and Kavanaugh
- Dissent: Jackson, joined by Sotomayor

Laws applied
- 42 U.S.C. § 1395ww

Advocate Christ Medical Center v. Kennedy, 605 U.S. 1 (2025), is a United States Supreme Court case holding that Medicare disproportionate share hospital adjustments should only consider patients as "entitled to supplementary security income benefits" if they received such benefits during the month in which they were hospitalized.

== Background ==
Medicare is a federal health insurance program for Americans that are at least 65 years old and/or disabled. Medicare offers a disproportionate share hospital (DSH) adjustment to increase its reimbursement to facilities that treat a high percentage of low-income patients.

The DSH adjustment analyzes patients entitled to Medicare Part A and Supplemental Security Income (SSI). Since 2010, the US Department of Health and Human Services (HHS) has categorized patients as "entitled to supplementary security income benefits (excluding any state supplementation) under subchapter XVI" if they received such benefits during the month in which they were hospitalized.

In Becerra v. Empire Health Foundation (2022), the Supreme Court interpreted "entitled to benefits" as including all patients who qualify for Medicare Part A, regardless of whether they use the program to finance their care. Citing that decision, a group of more than 200 hospitals sued to reinterpret the clause as including all patients enrolled in the SSI system. The Provider Reimbursement Review Board, Centers for Medicare & Medicaid Services, US District Court for the District of Columbia, and US Court of Appeals for the District of Columbia Circuit successively rejected this request.

After the Supreme Court granted certiorari on June 10, 2024, the Association of American Medical Colleges, American Hospital Association, America's Essential Hospitals, Federation of American Hospitals, National Rural Health Association, and Catholic Health Association jointly filed an amicus curiae brief favoring reinterpretation. The coalition noted that aside from providing hospitals with ~$1 billion per year in additional DSH payments, reinterpretation would expand eligibility for DSH, which affects entitlement to initiatives like the 340B Drug Pricing Program.

== Supreme Court ==
In a 7-2 decision, the Supreme Court affirmed HHS' interpretation. Writing for the majority, Associate Justice Amy Coney Barrett ignored the non-cash benefits that SSI enrollees still receive during months in which they are ineligible for cash because only the latter are Subchapter XVI benefits. During such months, enrollees remain eligible for Medicaid, but the majority declined to construe this provision as a SSI benefit. Whereas Medicare Part A benefits persist unless a non-elderly patient's disability declines, statutory law already requires monthly reassessment of SSI eligibility.

=== Dissent ===
Associate Justice Ketanji Brown Jackson wrote a dissenting opinion noting that statutory law keeps enrollees in SSI until they are ineligible for cash benefits for twelve consecutive months. In Jackson's view, this extended enrollment reflects intentional design of SSI as insurance against decreased income, rather than solely cash benefits.
