= Stanley v. City of Sanford =

U.S. Supreme Court case

- Supreme Court of the United States

Argued January 13, 2025 Decided June 20, 2025
- Full case name: Karyn D. Stanley v. City of Sanford, Florida
- Docket no.: 23-997
- Argument: Oral argument
- Decision: Opinion

Case history
- Prior: Summary judgement, Docket No. 6:20-cv-00629-WWB-GJK; United States District Court for the Middle District of Florida; Judgement of the District Court affirmed, 83 F.4th 1333 (11th Cir. 2023); United States Court of Appeals for the Eleventh Circuit

Questions presented
- Under the Americans with Disabilities Act, does a former employee—who was qualified to perform her job and who earned post-employment benefits while employed—lose her right to sue over discrimination with respect to those benefits solely because she no longer holds her job?

Holding
- Only individuals who “hold” or “desire” a position are considered “qualified individuals” under Title I of the ADA. Therefore, once an employee retires, they no longer meet this definition and cannot bring a discrimination claim regarding benefit changes. As a result, the court dismissed the suit challenging cuts to post-employment benefits.

Court membership
- Chief Justice John Roberts Associate Justices Clarence Thomas · Samuel Alito; Sonia Sotomayor · Elena Kagan; Neil Gorsuch · Brett Kavanaugh; Amy Coney Barrett · Ketanji Brown Jackson

Case opinions
- Majority: Gorsuch (Parts I, II), joined by Roberts, Thomas, Alito, Kagan, Kavanaugh, Barrett
- Plurality: Gorsuch (Parts III), joined by Alito, Sotomayor, Kagan
- Concurrence: Thomas (in part and in judgement), joined by Barrett
- Concur/dissent: Sotomayor
- Dissent: Jackson, joined by Sotomayor (Parts III, IV, except footnote 12)

Laws applied
- Americans with Disabilities Act of 1990

Stanley v. City of Sanford, 606 U.S. 46 (2025), is a United States Supreme Court decision clarifying the scope of Title I of the Americans with Disabilities Act. The Court held that the Act’s antidiscrimination provision applies only to “qualified individuals”—those who, at the time of the challenged actions, “hold” or “desire” an employment position and can perform its essential functions (with or without reasonable accommodation). Karyn Stanley, a firefighter who retired early due to disability and subsequently received reduced post-employment health-insurance benefits, sued the City of Sanford under § 12112(a) of the ADA; the lower courts dismissed her claim on the ground that, having neither held nor sought her position at the time of the benefit change, she was no longer a “qualified individual” entitled to Title I’s protections . The Supreme Court affirmed, concluding that retirees who do not hold or seek their former jobs lack standing to sue under Title I for discrimination in post-employment benefits.

== Background ==
Karyn D. Stanley employed as a firefighter in Sanford, Florida in 1999, where she served for fifteen years until 2016 when she was diagnosed with Parkinson's disease, she continued to work for two years until her physical condition left her incapable. On November 1, 2018, Stanley took a disability retirement at the age of 47.

When Stanley first joined the fire department in 1999, a policy is in effect where employees retiring for disability reasons were entitled to receive free health insurance until they were 65 years old. However, in 2003, the city changed its plan, under the new policy, retirees were entitled to receive free health insurance for twenty-four months after retiring. Starting on December 1, 2020, Stanley would be responsible for paying her insurance.

In April 2020, she sued the City of Sanford in the United States Middle District Court for the Middle District of Florida, arguing that the city's benefits plan change discriminated retired employees under the Americans with Disabilities Act and the Equal Protection Clause. The district court dismissed her claim, and granted summary judgement in favor of the city.

Stanley appealed to the United States Court of Appeals for the Eleventh Circuit, but the court upheld the lower court's decision.

== Supreme Court ==
The Court granted the certiorari, and the case was heard on January 13, 2025.
