= Department of Transportation v. Public Citizen =

- Supreme Court of the United States

Argued April 21, 2004 Decided June 7, 2004
- Full case name: Department of Transportation, et al. v. Public Citizen, et al.
- Citations: 541 U.S. 752 (more) 124 S. Ct. 2204; 159 L. Ed. 2d 60
- Argument: Oral argument

Case history
- Prior: Public Citizen v. DOT, 316 F.3d 1002 (9th Cir. 2003); cert. granted, 540 U.S. 1088 (2003).

Holding
- Because FMCSA lacks discretion to prevent cross-border operations of Mexican motor carriers, neither NEPA nor the CAA requires FMCSA to evaluate the environmental effects of such operations.

Court membership
- Chief Justice William Rehnquist Associate Justices John P. Stevens · Sandra Day O'Connor; Antonin Scalia · Anthony Kennedy; David Souter · Clarence Thomas; Ruth Bader Ginsburg · Stephen Breyer

Case opinion
- Majority: Thomas, joined by unanimous

Department of Transportation v. Public Citizen, 541 U.S. 752 (2004), is a Supreme Court of the United States case in which the court held that, because FMCSA lacks discretion to prevent cross-border operations of Mexican motor carriers, neither NEPA nor the CAA requires FMCSA to evaluate the environmental effects of such operations. The case was argued on 21 April 2004. The question the case presented related to presidential foreign affairs and foreign trade actions exempt from environmental-review requirements under the National Environmental Policy Act and the Clean Air Act. Specifically, the question is whether those actions are subject to those requirements as a result of a rulemaking action concerning motor carrier safety by the federal agency with responsibility for that type of safety.

== See also ==
- List of United States Supreme Court cases, volume 541
- List of United States Supreme Court cases
