= Rivers v. Guerrero =

- Supreme Court of the United States

Decided June 12, 2025
- Full case name: Rivers v. Guerrero
- Docket no.: 23-1345
- Citations: 605 U.S. 443 (more)

Holding
- Once a district court enters its judgment with respect to a first-filed habeas petition, a second-in-time filing qualifies as a "second or successive application" properly subject to the requirements of §2244(b).

Court membership
- Chief Justice John Roberts Associate Justices Clarence Thomas · Samuel Alito; Sonia Sotomayor · Elena Kagan; Neil Gorsuch · Brett Kavanaugh; Amy Coney Barrett · Ketanji Brown Jackson

Case opinion
- Majority: Jackson, joined by unanimous

Rivers v. Guerrero, 605 U.S. 443 (2025), was a United States Supreme Court case in which the court held that once a district court enters its judgment with respect to a first-filed habeas corpus petition, a second-in-time filing qualifies as a "second or successive application" properly subject to the requirements of §2244(b).

== Trial and appeals ==
Danny Rivers was convicted in Texas state court of criminal charges. After unsuccessfully seeking direct appeal and state habeas relief, Rivers filed his first federal habeas corpus petition in August 2017, asserting claims of prosecutorial misconduct, ineffective assistance of counsel (IAC), and other constitutional violations. The federal district court denied the petition in September 2018, and Rivers appealed to the Fifth Circuit, which granted a certificate of appealability on his post-conviction IAC claim in July 2020.

While his appeal was pending, Rivers obtained his trial lawyer's client file, which contained a state investigator's report that he believed was exculpatory. After the Fifth Circuit denied his request to supplement the record on appeal, Rivers filed in the district court to have the new evidence considered with his pending habeas application.

The district court said the second filing was subject to the rules for a "second or successive" habeas application because it raised new claims arising from the newly discovered evidence, and transferred to the Fifth Circuit. Rivers appealed but the Fifth Circuit upheld the transfer order so as not to "circumvent the requirements for filing successive petitions" under 28 U.S.C. § 2244(b).

The Supreme Court granted certiorari to resolve a Circuit split over whether § 2244(b)(2) applies to unexhausted claims.

== Supreme Court ==
=== Arguments ===
The State of Texas argued that the filing was a "second or successive" petition because it was a mixed petition, and some of the claims were new, and the Supreme Court has previously held Gonzalez v. Crosby that this would be a successive petition. Rivers argued that the "abuse of the writ" rule was not historically applied while an appeal was pending on a first habeas application.

=== Opinion of the court ===
In a unanimous opinion authored by Justice Ketanji Brown Jackson the Supreme Court agreed with the Fifth Circuit that a second filing related to a federal habeas action is considered a "second or successive" petition under the court's precedent Gonzales v. Crosby. The court cited Chief Justice William Rehnquist's decision in Felker v. Turpin explaining that AEDPA's restriction on successive filings is a "modified res judicata rule". Were petitioners allowed to raise new claims while an appeal was pending, the court says, a petitioner could "file any number of new applications...thereby prolonging the case seemingly indefinitely". Noting that pre-AEDPA practice was inconsistent, the court says Congress "chose to promote finality" by requiring authorization from the court of appeals to file a successive petitions: "The question before us today is merely when then requirement kicks in."

== See also ==
- Slack v. McDaniel
- Roberts v. LaVallee
