= Kousisis v. United States =

2025 US Supreme Court case

- Supreme Court of the United States

Argued December 9, 2024 Decided May 22, 2025
- Full case name: Stamatios Kousisis and Alpha Painting and Construction Co. v. United States
- Docket no.: 23-909
- Citations: 605 U.S. 114 (more)
- Argument: Oral argument
- Decision: Opinion

Holding
- A defendant who induces a victim to enter into a transaction under materially false pretenses may be convicted of federal fraud even if the defendant did not seek to cause the victim economic loss.

Court membership
- Chief Justice John Roberts Associate Justices Clarence Thomas · Samuel Alito; Sonia Sotomayor · Elena Kagan; Neil Gorsuch · Brett Kavanaugh; Amy Coney Barrett · Ketanji Brown Jackson

Case opinions
- Majority: Barrett, joined by Roberts, Thomas, Alito, Kagan, Kavanaugh, and Jackson
- Concurrence: Thomas
- Concurrence: Gorsuch (in part)
- Concurrence: Sotomayor (in judgement)

Laws applied
- 49 CFR 26.55 and 18 U.S.C. §§ 1343–1349

Kousisis v. United States, 605 U.S. 114 (2025), is a United States Supreme Court case unanimously holding that a defendant who induces a victim to enter into a transaction under materially false pretenses may be convicted of federal fraud even if the defendant did not seek to cause the victim economic loss.

== Background ==
In implementing the Infrastructure Investment and Jobs Act, United States Department of Transportation regulations require state transportation contracts funded by the federal government to subcontract a portion of their work to a disadvantaged business performing a "commercially useful function." When the Pennsylvania Department of Transportation (PennDOT) contracted Stamatios Kousisis and Alpha Painting and Construction Co. to paint in Philadelphia, they arranged for Markias Inc. to funnel checks and invoices from their actual suppliers.

Upon discovery, the federal government charged Kousisis and Alpha with wire fraud and conspiracy to commit wire fraud, arguing that they had fraudulently induced PennDOT to award the contract based on false pretenses. On appeal to the Third Circuit, Kousisis and Alpha argued that PennDOT was not defrauded of "money or property" as 18 U.S.C. § 1343 requires because they completed the painting work. The Third Circuit rejected this defense, creating a circuit split between similar Seventh, Eighth, and Tenth Circuit rulings and opposing decisions of the Second, Sixth, Ninth, Eleventh, and D.C. Circuits.

== Supreme Court ==
The Supreme Court was unanimous in its judgement that a defendant who induces a victim to enter into a transaction under materially false pretenses may be convicted of federal fraud even if the defendant did not seek to cause the victim economic loss. Writing for the majority, Associate Justice Amy Coney Barrett noted that in Ciminelli v. United States (2023), the Supreme Court had already unanimously held that mail and wire fraud convictions only require money or property to be the object of fraud, not that the victim experiences purely economic loss. Furthermore, the common law tort of fraud did not require a showing of economic loss, unlike the tort of deceit.

=== Concurrences ===
Associate Justice Clarence Thomas wrote a concurring opinion doubting that Kousisis and Alpha's misrepresentations were material because disadvantaged business regulations are largely unrelated to transportation contracts. Sonia Sotomayor concurred in the judgement, countering that PennDOT explicitly specified that failure to comply with the disadvantaged business regulations "is a material breach of this contract" and noncompliance would threaten the agency's access to federal funds.

Neil Gorsuch concurred in part, noting that state common law rejected criminalization of fraud done to recover valid debts and federal courts analyze fraud based on whether the requested service was provided. Thus, he disagreed with a footnote of the majority opinion claiming that "an 'injury' has occurred when a fraudster 'obtain[s] from an owner, by a false representation of a fact which he deems material, property which he would not otherwise have parted with upon the terms which he is thus induced to accept,'" which cited an 1893 Supreme Court of Pennsylvania decision. Framing the footnote as dicta unrelated to deciding this case, Gorsuch advised future sessions of the United States Supreme Court to ignore it.
