= Perttu v. Richards =

- Supreme Court of the United States

Argued February 25, 2025 Decided June 18, 2025
- Full case name: Perttu v. Richards
- Docket no.: 23-1324
- Citations: 605 U.S. 460 (more)
- Argument: Oral argument

Holding
- Parties are entitled to a jury trial on Prison Litigation Reform Act exhaustion when that issue is intertwined with the merits of a claim.

Court membership
- Chief Justice John Roberts Associate Justices Clarence Thomas · Samuel Alito; Sonia Sotomayor · Elena Kagan; Neil Gorsuch · Brett Kavanaugh; Amy Coney Barrett · Ketanji Brown Jackson

Case opinions
- Majority: Roberts, joined by Sotomayor, Kagan, Gorsuch, Jackson
- Dissent: Barrett, joined by Thomas, Alito, Kavanaugh

Laws applied
- U.S. Const. amend. VII, Prison Litigation Reform Act

Perttu v. Richards, 605 U.S. 460 (2025), was a United States Supreme Court case in which the court held that parties are entitled to a jury trial on Prison Litigation Reform Act (PLRA) exhaustion when that issue is intertwined with the merits of a claim.

== Background ==
The PLRA requires prisoners with complaints about prison conditions to exhaust available grievance procedures before filing a lawsuit in federal court. But exhaustion is not required when a prison administrator threatens individual inmates so as to prevent their use of otherwise proper procedures. Such interference with an inmate’s pursuit of relief renders the administrative process unavailable, so the PLRA does not prevent the lawsuit. The question presented is whether a party has a right to a jury trial on PLRA exhaustion when that dispute is intertwined with the merits of the underlying suit.

Kyle Richards, an incarcerated person, alleged that Thomas Perttu, a prison employee, sexually harassed him and other inmates. Richards also alleged that, when he attempted to file grievance documents about the abuse, Perttu destroyed them and retaliated against him for attempting to file them. Richards sued Perttu under Section 1983 for violating his constitutional rights, including his First Amendment right to file grievances. Perttu moved for summary judgment, arguing that the plaintiffs had failed to exhaust available grievance procedures as required by the PLRA. The judge concluded that there was a genuine issue of fact as to whether Plaintiffs were excused from properly exhausting their claims due to interference by Perttu and that the issue was appropriate for resolution during an evidentiary hearing. At that hearing, the judge concluded that Richards's witnesses regarding Perttu's alleged destruction of grievance forms "lacked credibility." The judge recommended dismissal without prejudice for failure to exhaust, and the district court adopted that recommendation. The Sixth Circuit reversed. It stated that there was "no doubt that a judge may otherwise resolve factual disputes regarding exhaustion under the PLRA," but it held that "the Seventh Amendment requires a jury trial when the resolution of the exhaustion issue under the PLRA would also resolve a genuine dispute of material fact regarding the merits of the plaintiff's substantive case."
