= Catholic Charities Bureau, Inc. v. Wisconsin Labor & Industry Review Commission =

Catholic Charities Bureau, Inc. v. Wisconsin Labor & Industry Review
- Supreme Court of the United States

Argued March 31, 2025 Decided June 2, 2025
- Full case name: Catholic Charities Bureau, Inc., et al. v. Wisconsin Labor & Industry Review Commission, et al.
- Docket no.: 24-154
- Citations: 605 U.S. 238 (more)
- Argument: Oral argument

Questions presented
- Whether a state violates the First Amendment's religion clauses by denying a religious organization an otherwise-available tax exemption because the organization does not meet the state's criteria for religious behavior?

Holding
- The Wisconsin Supreme Court's decision denying Catholic Charities Bureau a tax exemption available to religious entities under Wisconsin law, because it was not "operated primarily for religious purposes" as it neither engaged in proselytization nor limited its charitable services to Catholics, violated the First Amendment.

Court membership
- Chief Justice John Roberts Associate Justices Clarence Thomas · Samuel Alito; Sonia Sotomayor · Elena Kagan; Neil Gorsuch · Brett Kavanaugh; Amy Coney Barrett · Ketanji Brown Jackson

Case opinions
- Majority: Sotomayor, joined by unanimous
- Concurrence: Thomas
- Concurrence: Jackson

Laws applied
- U.S. Const. amend. I

Catholic Charities Bureau, Inc. v. Wisconsin Labor & Industry Review Commission, 605 U.S. 238 (2025), was a United States Supreme Court case that held the Wisconsin Supreme Court's decision denying Catholic Charities Bureau a tax exemption available to religious entities under Wisconsin law violated the First Amendment's Establishment Clause. The Supreme Court found that Wisconsin's denial was unconstitutional because it discriminated against religious organizations based on their religious activities.

== Background ==
Catholic Charities Bureau, Inc., of the Diocese of Superior in Wisconsin sought an unemployment tax exemption for its employees under Wisconsin Statute § 108.02(15). It argued that, as a Catholic charity guided by Catholic values, it operates to provide services to the poor and disadvantaged, and thus qualifies for the tax law exemption that excludes workers of organizations primarily run for religious purposes from being counted as "employees" for tax purposes. The state labor commission denied the request for exemption, concluding that even if its motivations were religious, the charity work itself was secular.

The Wisconsin Supreme Court upheld the labor commission's decision. It ruled that the group's activities were "primarily charitable and secular," as they do not proselytize and provide their services to people of all faiths.

Catholic Charities then filed a writ of certiorari with the U.S. Supreme Court, which heard oral arguments on March 31, 2025. Catholic Charities argued that the denial of tax exemption violated church autonomy due to its separate incorporation from the diocese, improperly involved the state in religious matters by questioning whether its services are religious, and discriminated against it by favoring groups that proselytize or serve only their own faith.

Wisconsin argued that the exemption only applies to what the state described as clearly religious activities, such as worship or teaching; that it is meant for groups whose hiring decisions involve religious considerations; and that denying the exemption doesn’t impact religious beliefs, only small financial benefits.

President Donald Trump's administration argued in support of Catholic Charities, filing an amicus curiae with the U.S. Supreme Court.

== Opinion of the Court ==
In June 2025, the U.S. Supreme Court reversed the Wisconsin Supreme Court's ruling. Justice Sonia Sotomayor wrote the 9-0 opinion for the Court.

In citing the principle of denominational neutrality, Sotomayor noted that since the group's Catholic beliefs actually forbid it from preaching or only helping Catholics, denying the exemption unfairly favors certain religions over others by making distinctions based on their religious practices. Applying strict scrutiny, the Court found that Wisconsin's application of its unemployment tax scheme was not narrowly tailored to serve the state's interest in providing coverage for its unemployed citizens and, therefore, violated the First Amendment of the Constitution.

Justices Clarence Thomas and Ketanji Brown Jackson wrote separate concurring opinions.
