= NRC v. Texas =

Nuclear Regulatory Commission v. Texas
- Supreme Court of the United States

Decided June 18, 2025
- Full case name: Nuclear Regulatory Commission v. Texas
- Docket no.: 23-1300
- Citations: 605 U.S. 665 (more)

Holding
- Only parties to the NRC's licensing proceedings are entitled to obtain judicial review of the Commission's licensing decisions.

Court membership
- Chief Justice John Roberts Associate Justices Clarence Thomas · Samuel Alito; Sonia Sotomayor · Elena Kagan; Neil Gorsuch · Brett Kavanaugh; Amy Coney Barrett · Ketanji Brown Jackson

Case opinions
- Majority: Kavanaugh
- Dissent: Gorsuch, joined by Thomas, Alito

Nuclear Regulatory Commission v. Texas, 605 U.S. 665 (2025), was a United States Supreme Court case in which the court held that only parties to the Nuclear Regulatory Commission's licensing proceedings are entitled to obtain judicial review of the Commission's licensing decisions.

== Background ==
The Atomic Energy Act of 1954 generally prohibits the private possession of nuclear materials, including spent nuclear fuel, without a license. The Nuclear Regulatory Commission promulgated regulations in 1980 allowing licenses to be granted for private off-site storage of spent fuel. These regulations were left undisturbed by the Nuclear Waste Policy Act of 1982 and were upheld by the DC Circuit Court of Appeals in 2004.

In this case, Interim Storage Partners (ISP) applied for a license to build a facility in Texas to store spent nuclear fuel. During ISP’s licensing proceeding, a Texas government agency submitted comments, including comments on a draft environmental impact statement prepared by the Commission for the proposed facility. Fasken Land and Minerals, a private Texan business, similarly submitted comments, and it also sought to intervene in the licensing proceeding. The Commission denied Fasken's petition to intervene. Fasken unsuccessfully challenged that denial of intervention before the full Commission and the D.C. Circuit.

In September 2021, the Commission granted ISP a license to build and operate its proposed storage facility. Texas and Fasken sought review of the Commission’s licensing decision in the Fifth Circuit. The Fifth Circuit found that the agency's action was ultra vires and vacated ISP’s license, holding that licensing a private off-site facility to store spent fuel exceeded the Commission's statutory authority. This holding conflicted with the DC Circuit's 2004 decision Bullcreek v. NRC.

== Supreme Court ==
=== Kavanaugh's majority opinion ===
Justice Kavanaugh, upholding a general consensus that has become established in circuit court decisions since the 1970s, held that "parties" to a licensing procedure may raise statutory claims under the Hobbs Act (28 U.S.C. § 2344). However, submitting comments or attempting to intervene in the licensing procedure are not enough to qualify as a "party" because the Atomic Energy Act has specific requirements: "In any proceeding under this chapter, for the granting...of any license...the Commission shall grant a hearing upon the request of any person whose interest may be affected by the proceeding, and shall admit any such person as a party to such proceeding." Justice Kavanaugh interprets this to mean that a person becomes a "party" after they are granted a hearing.

The Fifth Circuit agreed with Fasken's ultra vires claim. However, after the Administrative Procedure Act provided a general cause of action for challenging agency action, the Supreme Court held in Leedom v. Kyne and Boire v. Greyhound Corp. that an agency order may be reviewed ultra vires only if no statutory cause of action is available. The Court says ultra vires review is not "an easy end-run around the limitations of the Hobbs Act" and limits Leedom v. Kyne to situations where an agency acts contrary to a "specific prohibition" in a statute and there is no statutory provision for judicial review. Because the Hobbs Act provides for judicial review of the licensing proceeding, the Court rules, without deciding whether the agency exceeded its statutory authority, that Texas and Fasken's claims are not reviewable under § 2344 .

=== Gorsuch's dissent ===
The dissent argued that the Commission exceeded its statutory authority, and disagreed with the majority's ruling that Texas and Fasken were not "parties" unless admitted by the agency, comparing it to "letting the fox guard the henhouse". Justice Gorsuch said Texas and Fasken's extensive comments during the environmental review qualified them as "parties" under circuit court precedents. He said upholding the Commission's argument "forces us to reimagine a statute expanding public access to the agency's administrative proceedings into one restricting access".
