= Ames v. Ohio Department of Youth Services =

- Supreme Court of the United States

Argued February 26, 2025 Decided June 5, 2025
- Full case name: Marlean A. Ames v. Ohio Department of Youth Services
- Docket no.: 23-1039
- Argument: Oral argument
- Decision: Opinion

Case history
- Prior: Summary judgment for the defendant, Ames v. Ohio Department of Youth Services, No. 2:20-cv-05935 (S.D. Ohio March 16, 2023). Affirmed, 87 F.4th 822 (6th Cir. 2023).

Questions presented
- Whether, in addition to pleading the other elements of Title VII, a majority-group plaintiff must show "background circumstances to support the suspicion that the defendant is that unusual employer who discriminates against the majority."

Holding
- Heightened evidentiary standards, in the context of Title VII, are not supported by the text of the statute or Supreme Court precedent.

Court membership
- Chief Justice John Roberts Associate Justices Clarence Thomas · Samuel Alito; Sonia Sotomayor · Elena Kagan; Neil Gorsuch · Brett Kavanaugh; Amy Coney Barrett · Ketanji Brown Jackson

Case opinions
- Majority: Jackson, joined by unanimous
- Concurrence: Thomas, joined by Gorsuch

Laws applied
- Civil Rights Act of 1964

Ames v. Ohio Department of Youth Services, 605 U.S. 303 (2025), is a decision of the United States Supreme Court case about whether a claim of discrimination against a member of a majority group, commonly called reverse discrimination, requires an additional showing of "background circumstances" supporting a suspicion that the employer is "that unusual employer who discriminates against the majority". The Supreme Court, in an opinion by Justice Ketanji Brown Jackson, unanimously held that this more difficult standard for showing discrimination against a member of a majority group was at odds with Title VII and could not be used.

== Legal background ==
In Title VII of the Civil Rights Act of 1964, Congress prohibited discrimination in employment on the basis of the protected characteristics of color, race, sex, religion, and national origin. In McDonald v. Santa Fe Trail Transportation Co. (1976), the Supreme Court held that this prohibits discrimination against members either of a minority group or of a majority group. And in Bostock v. Clayton County (2020), the Supreme Court held that discrimination on the basis of sexual orientation qualifies as prohibited discrimination on the basis of sex.

In McDonnell Douglas Corp. v. Green (1973), the Supreme Court held that, in order to survive a motion for summary judgment, a plaintiff alleging discrimination under Title VII must make a prima facie showing of discrimination, the first in a series of shifting burdens of proof known as McDonnell Douglas burden-shifting.

== Case history ==
The case was brought by Marlean Ames, a straight woman who alleged that the Ohio Department of Youth Services discriminated against her on the basis of sexual orientation in violation of Title VII of the Civil Rights Act of 1964. She had worked in the department since 2004. In 2017, Ames was reassigned to a new supervisor, who was a lesbian woman. In 2019, she applied for a promotion to be bureau chief of quality. Her application was rejected, and she was demoted from her position as administrator shortly afterwards. The promotion was given instead to a lesbian co-worker, and the administrator position was given to a 25-year old gay man.

Ames sued in the United States District Court for the Southern District of Ohio. The district court granted summary judgment in favor of the defendant, applying the "background circumstances" test, under which Ames had to show either statistical evidence that her employer discriminated against the majority group or evidence that the employment decision was made by the minority group. On appeal, the Sixth Circuit Court of Appeals said that Ames had satisfied the usual elements of a prima facie showing of sex discrimination because she was demoted from a position from which she was qualified and replaced with a gay man. However, the Sixth Circuit held that she had failed to make an additional showing of background circumstances to support an inference that the employer would discriminate against the majority group (heterosexuals), so the court affirmed the judgment.

Judge Kethledge concurred in the majority opinion based on the Sixth Circuit's prior precedents recognizing the background circumstances test, but criticized the test and called for the Supreme Court to review the question. He noted that there was a circuit split, saying that five federal court of appeal circuits apply the test, seven do not, and two of those had expressly rejected it.

== Supreme Court ==
On October 4, 2024, the Supreme Court agreed to hear the case, and oral arguments were heard on February 26, 2025. Elizabeth Prelogar, the Solicitor General during the Biden administration, filed an amicus brief for the United States agreeing with Ames that the Court should reject the background circumstances test.

The Supreme Court issued its unanimous decision on June 5, 2025, to reverse the Sixth Circuit's decision. Justice Jackson, writing for the Court, said that the stricter "background circumstance" test used by the Sixth Circuit and other circuit courts was in conflict with Title VII.

== Significance ==
Discrimination lawsuits have increasingly been used to challenge employers' diversity, equity, and inclusion programs, especially after Students for Fair Admissions v. Harvard (2023), the Supreme Court case striking down race-based affirmative action in higher education. The Supreme Court's decision in Ames could make it easier for these discrimination claims to succeed—at least in the five circuits that had adopted a "background circumstances" test.
