= Soto v. United States =

- Supreme Court of the United States

Decided June 12, 2025
- Full case name: Soto v. United States
- Docket no.: 24-320
- Citations: 605 U.S. 360 (more)

Holding
- The CRSC statute confers authority to settle CRSC claims and thus displaces the Barring Act's settlement procedures and limitations period.

Court membership
- Chief Justice John Roberts Associate Justices Clarence Thomas · Samuel Alito; Sonia Sotomayor · Elena Kagan; Neil Gorsuch · Brett Kavanaugh; Amy Coney Barrett · Ketanji Brown Jackson

Case opinion
- Majority: Thomas, joined by unanimous

Laws applied
- 31 U.S.C. § 370, 10 U.S.C. § 1413a

Soto v. United States, 605 U.S. 360 (2025), was a United States Supreme Court case in which the court held that the combat-related special compensation (CRSC) statute, 10 U.S.C. § 1413a, confers authority to settle CRSC claims and thus displaces the Barring Act's settlement procedures and limitations period.
