= Martin v. United States =

- Supreme Court of the United States

Argued April 29, 2025 Decided June 12, 2025
- Full case name: Curtrina Martin, et al., v. United States of America, et al.
- Docket no.: 24-362
- Argument: Oral argument
- Opinion announcement: Opinion announcement

Holding
- (1) The law enforcement proviso overrides only the intentional-tort exception of the Federal Tort Claims Act, not the discretionary-function exception or other exceptions. (2) The Supremacy Clause does not afford the United States a defense in FTCA suits. (3) On remand, the Eleventh Circuit should consider whether the discretionary function exception bars either the plaintiffs' negligent- or intentional-tort claims.

Court membership
- Chief Justice John Roberts Associate Justices Clarence Thomas · Samuel Alito; Sonia Sotomayor · Elena Kagan; Neil Gorsuch · Brett Kavanaugh; Amy Coney Barrett · Ketanji Brown Jackson

Case opinions
- Majority: Gorsuch, joined by unanimous
- Concurrence: Sotomayor, joined by Jackson

Laws applied
- Federal Torts Claims Act

Martin v. United States, 605 U.S. 395 (2025), is a U.S. Supreme Court decision regarding the limitations of the Federal Tort Claims Act (FTCA), a federal law which allows private parties to sue the federal government for torts committed by people acting on behalf of the federal government.

On October 18, 2017, a team of SWAT agents of the Federal Bureau of Investigation raided the home of Trina Martin, her partner at the time Toi Cliatt, and Martin's 7-year-old son. The agents forcefully entered the house with guns drawn using a battering ram and flash grenades. After handcuffing Cliatt and questioning him, the agents realized they had entered the wrong house by mistake. They had intended to arrest a suspected gang member who lived nearby.

In 2019, Martin and Cliatt sued the federal government under the FTCA for the wrong-house raid. A federal judge initially dismissed the case, and the U.S. Court of Appeals for the Eleventh Circuit upheld that dismissal, holding that the FTCA's "discretionary-function exception", as well as the Constitution's Supremacy Clause, prevents Martin and Cliatt from bringing their claims under the FTCA. The Supreme Court granted certiorari on January 27, 2025. The court heard oral arguments on April 29, 2025. In a unanimous (9–0) decision authored by Justice Neil Gorsuch, the Supreme Court vacated the decision of the Eleventh Circuit and remanded the case for further proceedings.

== Background ==
=== Federal Tort Claims Act ===
The doctrine of sovereign immunity ordinarily prevents private individuals from suing the United States federal government, except in cases where Congress allows the federal government to be sued. In 1946, Congress enacted the Federal Tort Claims Act (FTCA) to allow private persons to sue the federal government in cases where a government employee commits a tort (a civil wrong) "while acting within the scope of" their position in the government.

The FTCA has a number of exceptions, however, one of which is called the "discretionary function exception". This exception prevents the federal government from being sued over decisions that involve a federal employee's "discretionary function or duty", regardless of whether that discretion was exercised abusively. According to the Harvard Law Review, lower courts have applied a broad interpretation of this exception, allowing the government to succeed in invoking it to dismiss "nearly seventy-five percent of claims". At the same time, however, the FTCA has a provision called the "law-enforcement proviso", which specifically allows for persons to sue the government for "claims arising out of 'assault, battery, false imprisonment, false arrest, abuse of process, or malicious prosecution' committed by federal law-enforcement officers".

=== Wrong-house raid ===
On the morning of October 18, 2017, a team of six SWAT agents led by Lawrence Guerra of the Federal Bureau of Investigation forcefully entered a home near Atlanta, Georgia, seeking to arrest a suspected gang member named Joseph Riley. In fact, the home was occupied by Trina Martin; Toi Cliatt, Martin's boyfriend at the time; and Martin's son Gabe, who was seven years old at the time. The agents broke down the door using a battering ram and then set off a flash grenade. Upon hearing the noise, Cliatt stated that he initially thought of reaching for his shotgun but hesitated, thinking the intruders might be law enforcement. He and Martin then hid in a closet, unable to reach Martin's son, who cried for her from another room and hid under his bed. According to court documents, after the agents handcuffed Cliatt, one of them noticed that he did not have the tattoos they expected on the intended target of the raid. When the agent asked Cliatt for his name and address, that was when they realized they had entered the wrong house. The agents then left and arrested the intended target at the correct house, who was later convicted. Guerra, the lead FBI agent, later returned to apologize and gave Martin and Cliatt the business card of his supervisor. In total, the FBI spent some five minutes in Martin and Cliatt's house.

Martin, Cliatt, and Martin's son have stated that they suffered psychological trauma from the incident. In an article published by the Associated Press, Martin stated that she had to quit being a track coach "because the starting pistol reminded her of the flashbang grenade the agents set off". In the same article, Cliatt stated that he developed problems sleeping, which led him to quit his job as a truck driver. In an article published in 2025 by ABC News, Martin's son Gabe—who was now 13—stated that "the experience dramatically altered his life" and that he "didn't really have a childhood growing up because of that".

=== Lower court proceedings ===
In 2019, Martin and Cliatt sued the federal government under the Federal Tort Claims Act, bringing claims of "false arrest, negligence, false imprisonment, and assault and battery", among others. A judge in the U.S. District Court for the Northern District of Georgia dismissed Martin and Cliatt's case in 2022, and a panel of the U.S. Court of Appeals for the Eleventh Circuit affirmed that decision in 2024. The court of appeals held that Martin and Cliatt could not bring their claims under the FTCA for two reasons. First, the Eleventh Circuit held that the Supremacy Clause of the U.S. Constitution, which states that federal laws and the federal Constitution take precedence over state laws, prevents Martin and Cliatt from bringing liability claims against the federal government based on state law when the government's actions "'have some nexus with furthering federal policy' and 'can reasonably be characterized as complying with the full range of federal law'". Second, the Eleventh Circuit also held that the discretionary function exception prevents Martin and Cliatt from bringing their claims under the FTCA, even though some of the claims may fall under the law enforcement proviso.

== Supreme Court ==
The Supreme Court granted certiorari on January 27, 2025, limited to two questions:

1. "Whether the discretionary-function exception is categorically inapplicable to claims arising under the law enforcement proviso to the intentional torts exception."
2. "Whether the Constitution's Supremacy Clause bars claims under the Federal Tort Claims Act when the negligent or wrongful acts of federal employees have some nexus with furthering federal policy and can be reasonably characterized as complying with the full range of federal law."

=== Oral argument ===
The court heard oral arguments on April 29, 2025. Counsel for petitioners Martin and Cliatt argued that the FTCA discretionary function exception never applies to claims under the law enforcement proviso, while the government argued that the law enforcement proviso does not create "an exception to the discretionary function exception". An article published by NBC News reported that the "justices did not seem too impressed by either side's arguments" during the oral argument, and it speculated that the court would hand down a "narrow win" for Martin and Cliatt but also "allow a lower court another chance to decide whether the claims are covered by the discretionary function exception". On the question of the Supremacy Clause, the government conceded that the Eleventh Circuit erred but argued that the discretionary function exception meant that the Supreme Court did not need to decide on that question. The Supreme Court appointed a separate lawyer to defend the Eleventh Circuit's Supremacy Clause argument, but according to an analysis published in SCOTUSblog, "the justices had relatively few questions for him" during oral argument.

=== Decision ===
The Supreme Court ruled unanimously for the government on the first question and for the petitioners on the second question. Justice Neil Gorsuch wrote the majority opinion and Justice Sonia Sotomayor and Justice Ketanji Brown Jackson wrote a concurring opinion. The court vacated and remanded the case.
