= EPA v. Calumet Shreveport Refining =

US Supreme Court case on venue for challenging EPA regulations under the Clean Air Act

- Supreme Court of the United States

Argued March 25, 2025 Decided June 18, 2025
- Full case name: Environmental Protection Agency v. Calumet Shreveport Refining, LLC
- Docket no.: 23-1229
- Citations: 605 U.S. 627 (more)
- Argument: Oral argument

Case history
- Prior: Calumet Shreveport Refining v. EPA 86 F.4th 1121 (5th Cir. 2023)

Holding
- The EPA's denials of small refinery exemption petitions are locally or regionally applicable actions that fall within the "nationwide scope or effect" exception of the Clean Air Act, requiring venue in the D.C. Circuit.

Court membership
- Chief Justice John Roberts Associate Justices Clarence Thomas · Samuel Alito; Sonia Sotomayor · Elena Kagan; Neil Gorsuch · Brett Kavanaugh; Amy Coney Barrett · Ketanji Brown Jackson

Case opinions
- Majority: Thomas, joined by Alito, Sotomayor, Kagan, Kavanaugh, Barrett, Jackson
- Dissent: Gorsuch, joined by Roberts

Laws applied
- Clean Air Act

EPA v. Calumet Shreveport Refining, 605 U.S. 627 (2025), is a United States Supreme Court case in which the court held that the Environmental Protection Agency's denials of small refinery exemption petitions are locally or regionally applicable actions that fall within the "nationwide scope or effect" exception of the Clean Air Act, requiring venue in the D.C. Circuit.

== Background ==
Under 42 U.S.C. § 7607(b)(1) of the Clean Air Act, those seeking judicial review of air quality and emissions standards set by the Environmental Protection Agency (EPA) should file their case with the federal court of appeals that governs the affected party if the regulations are "locally or regionally applicable." However, if the regulation "is based on a determination of nationwide scope or effect," then the challenge should instead be heard by the US District of Columbia Circuit.

As part of the Energy Policy Act of 2005, the EPA created the Renewable Fuel Standard program, requiring transportation fuel sold in the United States to contain a portion of renewable fuels. The EPA is required to provide temporary exemptions to small refineries if compliance with the program would cause "disproportionate economic hardship." While the EPA is required to respond to petitions claiming such hardship within ninety days of their filing, the agency frequently issues decisions far beyond this deadline.

In 2019, the EPA granted thirty-one small refinery exemptions to compliance during the prior year, but the D.C. Circuit ordered those petitions to be reconsidered in response to the Tenth Circuit's 2020 ruling in Renewable Fuels Association v. EPA. In April 2022, the EPA subsequently denied these refineries' petitions after re-analyzing their legal claim to exemptions. In June 2022, the EPA denied an additional sixty-nine petitions by applying its new framework, which discards the US Department of Energy's scoring matrix in favor of solely evaluating the costs of compliance.

=== Fifth Circuit ===
When six of these refineries sought judicial review of their hardship petition denials, the Fifth Circuit Court of Appeals deemed itself the appropriate venue because overturning the denials would only affect the parties of this case, rather than requiring the EPA to use a new regulatory framework in all future assessments of hardship petitions. The Fifth Circuit subsequently ruled that the EPA could not surprise small refineries by retroactively penalizing them for their good-faith reliance on its scoring matrix during prior years. Furthermore, the Fifth Circuit ruled that EPA's new approach violated the Administrative Procedure Act for being arbitrary and capricious because Congress set a standard of "disproportionate economic hardship," whereas evaluating the costs of compliance only examines the extent of economic hardship, not its proportionality.

Circuit Judge Patrick Higginbotham dissented from this ruling, highlighting that the April and June 2022 joint denials of hardship petitions involved refineries across the United States, showcasing a nationally applicable standard. In support of this point, Higginbotham noted that the Third, Seventh, and Tenth Circuits had all transferred their similar cases to the D.C. Circuit.

=== Forum shopping ===
In law, forum shopping involves litigants acting to have their case heard in whichever court they believe is most likely to provide a favorable judgment. Law professor Steve Vladeck noted that whereas the Judicial Conference of the United States is primarily concerned with judge shopping, this case involved "circuit shopping" along statutory grounds. NPR legal correspondent Nina Totenberg highlighted that four of the Supreme Court's nine justices (John Roberts, Clarence Thomas, Brett Kavanaugh, and Ketanji Brown Jackson) previously served on the D.C. Circuit, suggesting that they would prefer that court to hear such cases.

== Supreme Court ==
On October 21, 2024, the Supreme Court granted certiorari to review the Fifth Circuit's judgement on the appropriate venue for such challenges. In its June 2025 decision, the Supreme Court agreed with the Fifth Circuit, holding that each EPA denial of a request for exemption was a discrete local or regionally applicable action, however, in a 7-2 majority opinion the Supreme Court said the EPA determinations that explained the denials were based on a determination of nationwide scope or effect.

Justice Neil Gorsuch wrote a dissent joined by the Chief Justice arguing that the CAA directs the EPA to make certain "determinations" before taking specified "actions", and nowhere required the EPA to make a "determination of nationwide scope or effect" to act on a small refinery's hardship petition.
