= A. J. T. v. Osseo Area Schools =

- Supreme Court of the United States

Decided June 12, 2025
- Full case name: A. J. T. v. Osseo Area Schools
- Docket no.: 24-249
- Citations: 605 U.S. 335 (more)

Holding
- Schoolchildren bringing ADA and Rehabilitation Act claims related to their education are subject to the same standards that apply in other disability discrimination contexts.

Court membership
- Chief Justice John Roberts Associate Justices Clarence Thomas · Samuel Alito; Sonia Sotomayor · Elena Kagan; Neil Gorsuch · Brett Kavanaugh; Amy Coney Barrett · Ketanji Brown Jackson

Case opinions
- Majority: Roberts, joined by unanimous
- Concurrence: Thomas, joined by Kavanaugh
- Concurrence: Sotomayor, joined by Jackson

Laws applied
- Americans with Disabilities Act, Rehabilitation Act

A. J. T. v. Osseo Area Schools, 605 U.S. 335 (2025), was a United States Supreme Court case in which the court held that schoolchildren bringing Americans with Disabilities Act and Rehabilitation Act claims related to their education are subject to the same standards that apply in other disability discrimination contexts, rather than a higher standard.

== Background ==
At the time of the case, A.J.T. was a teenager who was unable to participate in certain educational activities due to a rare form of epilepsy. When her parents requested that the school district provide evening instruction as an accommodation for A.J.T.'s condition, the district denied the request. The parents sued in federal court on behalf of their daughter, "alleging violations of Title II of the ADA and Section 504 of the Rehabilitation Act."

The district court held that A.J.T. was a "qualified individual with a disability," but that her claim failed the applicable legal standard, i.e., that the school district "acted with bad faith or gross misjudgment. That decision was affirmed by the United States Court of Appeals for the Eighth Circuit.

== Opinion of the Court ==
Writing for the unanimous Court, Chief Justice John Roberts held that the heightened standard imposed by some of the courts of appeal was a result of their "effectively read[ing] the IDEA [Individuals with Disabilities Education Act] to implicitly limit the ability of children with disabilities to vindicate their independent ADA and Rehabilitation Act rights." According to the Court, that approach was "irreconcilable with the unambiguous directive" of the applicable laws.
