= United States v. Miller (2025) =

2025 US Supreme Court decision

- Supreme Court of the United States

Argued December 2, 2024 Decided March 26, 2025
- Full case name: United States v. David Miller
- Docket no.: 23-824
- Citations: 604 U.S. 518 (more)
- Argument: Oral argument
- Decision: Opinion

Questions presented
- May a bankruptcy trustee avoid a debtor’s tax payment to the federal government under 11 U.S.C. § 544(b) when no actual creditor could have obtained relief under the applicable state fraudulent-transfer law outside of bankruptcy?

Holding
- The Bankruptcy Code's waiver of sovereign immunity does not entitle a bankruptcy trustee to recover a debtor's fraudulent federal tax payments.

Court membership
- Chief Justice John Roberts Associate Justices Clarence Thomas · Samuel Alito; Sonia Sotomayor · Elena Kagan; Neil Gorsuch · Brett Kavanaugh; Amy Coney Barrett · Ketanji Brown Jackson

Case opinions
- Majority: Jackson, joined by Roberts, Thomas, Alito, Sotomayor, Kagan, Kavanaugh, and Barrett
- Dissent: Gorsuch

Laws applied
- United States Bankruptcy Code (11 U. S. C. §§106(a), 544(b))

United States v. Miller, 604 U.S. 518 (2025), is a United States Supreme Court case holding that the US Bankruptcy Code's waiver of sovereign immunity does not entitle a bankruptcy trustee to recover a debtor's fraudulent federal tax payments.

== Background ==
The United States Bankruptcy Code empowers a bankruptcy trustee to block fraudulent transfers of a debtor's assets. All Resort Group, a Utah-based business, was bankrupted by its shareholders misappropriating corporate funds to pay their personal taxes. The bankruptcy trustee, David Miller, sued the federal government to recover the funds. The federal government claimed sovereign immunity from such clawbacks, but this argument was successively rejected by the US Bankruptcy Court for the District of Utah, Utah District Court, and Court of Appeals for the Tenth Circuit.

== Supreme Court ==
In a majority opinion written by Associate Justice Ketanji Brown Jackson, the Supreme Court reversed the lower courts. Jackson interpreted the Bankruptcy Code's waiver of sovereign immunity as only providing jurisdiction for federal courts over bankruptcy cases, rather than exposing the government to liability. The case was remanded for consideration of Miller's alternative arguments based on Utah state law.

=== Dissent ===
Writing in dissent, Associate Justice Neil Gorsuch opined that the federal government's sovereign immunity against the claims of private creditors in state court is irrelevant to the scope of the federal government's waiver of sovereign immunity in bankruptcy proceedings. Gorsuch noted that the Fourth and Ninth Circuits had reached similar conclusions on this issue.
