= CC/Devas (Mauritius) Ltd. v. Antrix Corp. Ltd. =

- Supreme Court of the United States

Argued March 3, 2025 Decided June 5, 2025
- Full case name: CC/Devas (Mauritius) Limited; Devas Multimedia America, Inc.; Devas Employees Mauritius Private Limited; Telecom Devas Mauritius Limited v. Antrix Corp. Ltd.; Devas Multimedia Private Limited
- Docket no.: 23-1201
- Argument: Oral argument
- Decision: Opinion

Questions presented
- Whether plaintiffs must prove minimum contacts before federal courts may assert personal jurisdiction over foreign states sued under the Foreign Sovereign Immunities Act.

Holding
- Plaintiffs suing a foreign state under the FSIA need not show “minimum contacts”; once an immunity exception applies and the state is properly served under 28 U.S.C. § 1330(b), personal jurisdiction is established.

Court membership
- Chief Justice John Roberts Associate Justices Clarence Thomas · Samuel Alito; Sonia Sotomayor · Elena Kagan; Neil Gorsuch · Brett Kavanaugh; Amy Coney Barrett · Ketanji Brown Jackson

Case opinion
- Majority: Alito, joined by unanimous

CC/Devas (Mauritius) Ltd. v. Antrix Corp. Ltd., 605 U.S. 223 (2025), is a Supreme Court case holding that federal courts may exercise personal jurisdiction over a foreign state sued under the Foreign Sovereign Immunities Act as long as an immunity exception applies and the defendant has been properly served—without requiring the “minimum contacts” analysis of International Shoe Co. v. Washington. The Court vacated the Ninth Circuit’s decision and remanded for further proceedings under this interpretation of 28 U.S.C. § 1330(b).

== Background ==
Devas and Antrix are both Indian companies. In 2005, they entered into an agreement, which was subject to an arbitration clause. In 2011, Antrix repudiated the agreement, triggering the arbitration provision. In 2015, an arbitral commission awarded Devas $562.5 million. Until this point, the case had proceeded in tribunals outside of the United States.

Civil procedure in the United States requires American courts to dismiss cases when they lack personal jurisdiction over the parties. Under International Shoe Co. v. Washington, that requirement is understood to entail minimum contacts between the defendant (Note: Plaintiffs are understood to consent to personal jurisdiction by filing their complaint in a given court.) and the state in which the court is located. On the other hand, 28 U.S.C. § 1330 provides that federal courts "shall" have jurisdiction when process is correctly served on an opposing sovereign party under the Foreign Sovereign Immunities Act.

In 2018, Devas petitioned the United States District Court for the Western District of Washington to confirm the award. The court found it had personal jurisdiction and entered a stay. The Ninth Circuit reversed on August 1, 2023. The Supreme Court granted certiorari on October 4, 2024.
