= Dynamic braking =

Use of the traction motors as generators when slowing a vehicle

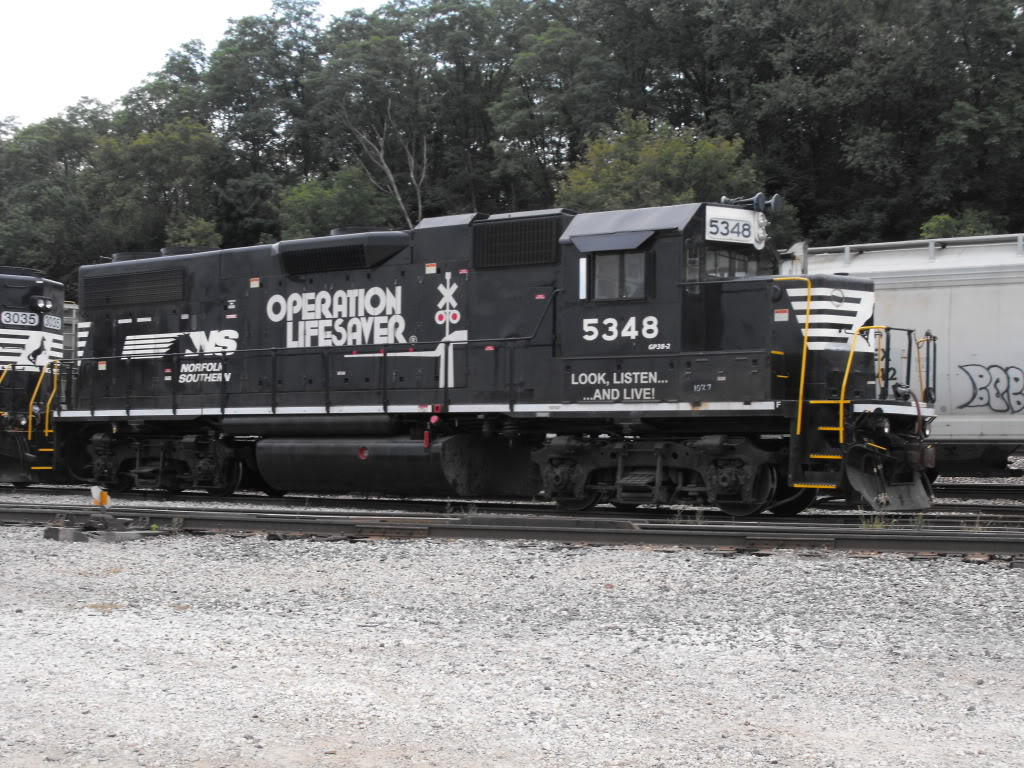
Norfolk Southern 5348 diesel–electric locomotive employs dynamic braking. The cooling grill for the brake grid resistors is at the top center of the locomotive.

Dynamic braking is the use of an electric traction motor as a generator when slowing a vehicle such as an electric or diesel–electric locomotive. It is termed "rheostatic" if the generated electrical power is dissipated as heat in brake grid resistors, and "regenerative" if the power is returned to the supply line. Dynamic braking reduces wear on friction-based braking components, and regeneration lowers net energy consumption. Dynamic braking may also be used on railcars with multiple units, light rail vehicles, electric trams, trolleybuses, and electric and hybrid electric automobiles.

== Principle of operation ==
Converting electrical energy to the mechanical energy of a rotating shaft (electric motor) is the inverse of converting the mechanical energy of a rotating shaft to electrical energy (electric generator). Both are accomplished through the interactions of armature windings with a (relatively) moving external magnetic field, with the armature connected to an electrical circuit with either a power supply (motor) or power receptor (generator). Since the role of the electrical/mechanical energy converting device is determined by which interface (mechanical or electrical) provides or receives energy, the same device can fulfill the role of either a motor or a generator. In dynamic braking, the traction motor is switched into the role of a generator by switching from a supply circuit to a receptor circuit while applying electric current to the field coils that generate the magnetic field (excitation).

The amount of resistance applied to the rotating shaft (braking power) equals the rate of electrical power generation plus some efficiency loss. That is in turn proportional to the strength of the magnetic field, controlled by the current in the field coils, and the rate at which the armature and magnetic field rotate against each other, determined by the rotation of the wheels and the ratio of power shaft to wheel rotation. The amount of braking power is controlled by varying the strength of the magnetic field through the amount of current in the field coils. As the rate of electrical power generation, and conversely braking power, are proportional to the rate at which the power shaft is spinning, a stronger magnetic field is required to maintain braking power as speed decreases and there is a lower limit at which dynamic braking can be effective depending on the current available for application to the field coils.

The two main methods of managing the electricity generated during dynamic braking are rheostatic braking and regenerative braking, as described below.

For permanent magnet motors, dynamic braking is easily achieved by shorting the motor terminals, thus bringing the motor to a fast abrupt stop. This method, however, dissipates all the energy as heat in the motor itself, and so cannot be used in anything other than low-power intermittent applications due to cooling limitations, such as in cordless power tools. It is not suitable for traction applications.

== Rheostatic braking ==
The electrical energy produced by the motors is dissipated as heat by a bank of onboard resistors, referred to as the braking grid. Large cooling fans are necessary to protect the resistors from damage. Modern systems have thermal monitoring, so that if the temperature of the bank becomes excessive it will be switched off, and the braking will revert to being by friction only.

== Regenerative braking ==
In electrified systems the process of regenerative braking is employed whereby the current produced during braking is fed back into the power supply system for use by other traction units, instead of being wasted as heat. It is normal practice to incorporate both regenerative and rheostatic braking in electrified systems. If the power supply system is not "receptive", i.e. incapable of absorbing the current, the system will default to rheostatic mode in order to provide the braking effect.

Yard locomotives with onboard energy storage systems which allow the recovery of some of the energy which would otherwise be wasted as heat are now available. The Green Goat model, for example, is being used by Canadian Pacific Railway, BNSF Railway, Kansas City Southern Railway and Union Pacific Railroad.

On modern passenger locomotives equipped with AC inverters pulling trains with sufficient head-end power (HEP) loads, braking energy can be used to power the train's on board systems via regenerative braking if the electrification system is not receptive or even if the track is not electrified to begin with. The HEP load on modern passenger trains is so great that some new electric locomotives such as the ALP-46 were designed without the traditional resistance grids.

== Blended braking ==
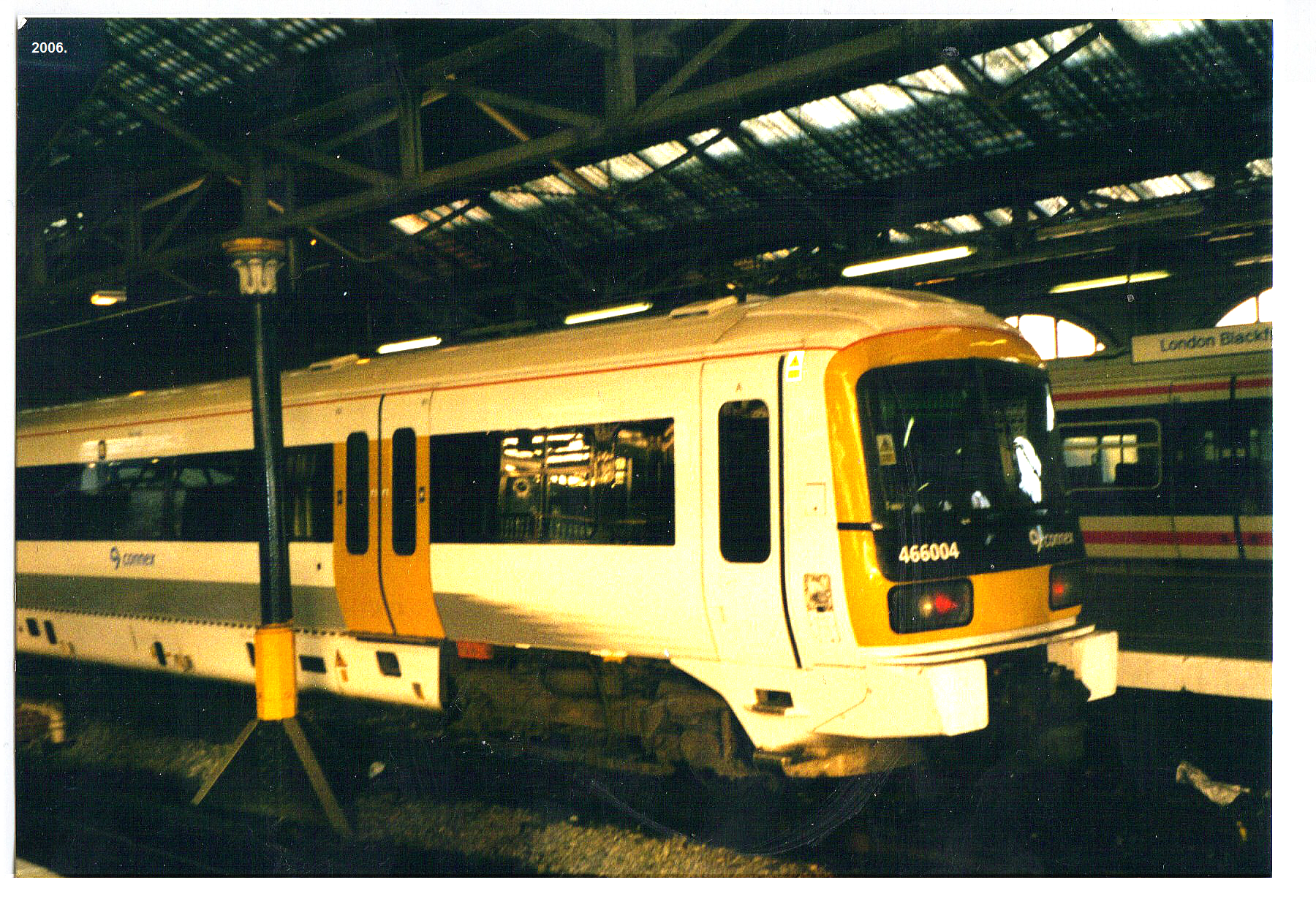
A Connex South Eastern Class 466 EMU at London Blackfriars station in 2006, which has been fitted with dynamic blended braking

Dynamic braking alone is not enough to stop a locomotive, because its braking effect rapidly diminishes below about 10 to 12 miles per hour (16 to 19 km/h). Therefore, it is always used in conjunction with another form of braking, such as an air brake. The use of both braking systems at the same time is called blended braking.Li-ion batteries have also been used to store energy for use in bringing trains to a complete halt.

Although blended braking combines both dynamic and air braking, the resulting braking force is designed to be the same as the air brakes on their own provide. This is achieved by maximizing the dynamic brake portion, and automatically regulating the air brake portion, because the main purpose of dynamic braking is to reduce the amount of air braking required. That conserves air and minimizes the risks of over-heated wheels. One locomotive manufacturer, Electro-Motive Diesel (EMD), estimates that dynamic braking provides between 50% and 70% of the braking force during blended braking.

== Plug braking ==
A third method of electric braking is plug braking or 'plugging', under which a reverse torque is applied for a short time. It is the most rapid form of electric braking, but comes at the disadvantage of applying significant transient stresses to motors and mechanical components. It is typically abrupt and 'jerky', the braking equivalent of a 'jog' in forward motion, and plug braking is never applied in electric traction applications. Nonetheless, it has been applied widely to applications such as long-travel and cross-travel drives of direct current and alternating-current powered overhead traveling cranes; hoist drives on such cranes typically use rheostatic braking. Reversing drives with (intentional) plug braking typically use rheostatic control for acceleration, and always have resistance in the motor circuit, when plug braking is applied, to limit the reverse (braking) torque. Plugging is usually achieved by moving the controller, briefly, to the first step of the opposite direction, and then back to the off position. After zero speed is reached, plugging must cease to avoid the drive running in reverse, and this function may be provided automatically, by a 'plugging relay'. Plugging does not fit well with inverter-controlled drives; it is becoming less common, and it is actively discouraged in modern crane operation.

== Self-load test ==
It is possible to use the brake grids as a form of dynamometer or load bank to perform a self-load test of the power output of a locomotive. With the locomotive stationary, the main generator (MG) output is connected to the grids instead of the traction motors. The grids are normally large enough to absorb the full engine power output, which is calculated from MG voltage and current output.

== Hydrodynamic braking ==
Diesel locomotives with hydraulic transmission may be equipped for hydrodynamic braking. In this case, the torque converter or fluid coupling acts as a retarder in the same way as a water brake. Braking energy heats the hydraulic fluid, and the heat is dissipated (via a heat exchanger) by the engine cooling radiator. The engine will be idling (and producing little heat) during braking, so the radiator is not overloaded.

== See also ==
- Counter-pressure brake
- Retarder (mechanical engineering)
- Eddy current brake
