= Peirameter =

Tool for comparing wheeled carriages

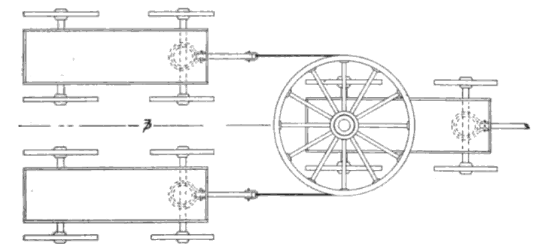
Periameter

A peirameter, also perameter (Greek: πεῖρα, 'attempt', + '‑meter') was a tool for comparing the forces required to draw wheeled carriages of different constructions or on different roads. A report in a 1817 book describes the device as follows:

"The apparatus employed in these experiments was as follows: A pulley seven feet in diameter mounted upon a carriage which can be drawn forward by men or horses. It turns upon a small centre and has been executed with such precision as to have nearly the accuracy of a balance. Mr Edgeworth has given the name of Peirameter to this machine. To determine the friction arising from the motion of it's axis and the bending of the rope which goes round it the whole machine was so raised as to place the wheel in a vertical situation and one hundred weight being suspended at each end of a rope that went round this pulley their equipoise was overcome by placing half a pound on either one side or the other.
To compare the draught of two carriages by means of this wheel one end of a rope passing round it must be fastened to one carriage and the other end to the other; if then the Peirameter be drawn forward, the carriage which moves the easiest will get before the other; and by adding weights to that which gets foremost, until both proceed together; the weight thus added becomes a measure of the advantage in the construction of one of these carriages over the other, or of the roads upon which they move. It must be observed, that the draft of carriages thus compared is not to be determined by one of them preceding the other but by the weight which produces an equality of draft.

The article proceeds further, reporting experiments with different axles, different greases, on different roads, etc.

This kind of work continued and better devices were invented, such as Mc.Neil's dynamometer (Macneill's road indicator).
