= Cyclocomputer =

Device for displaying bicycle trip data

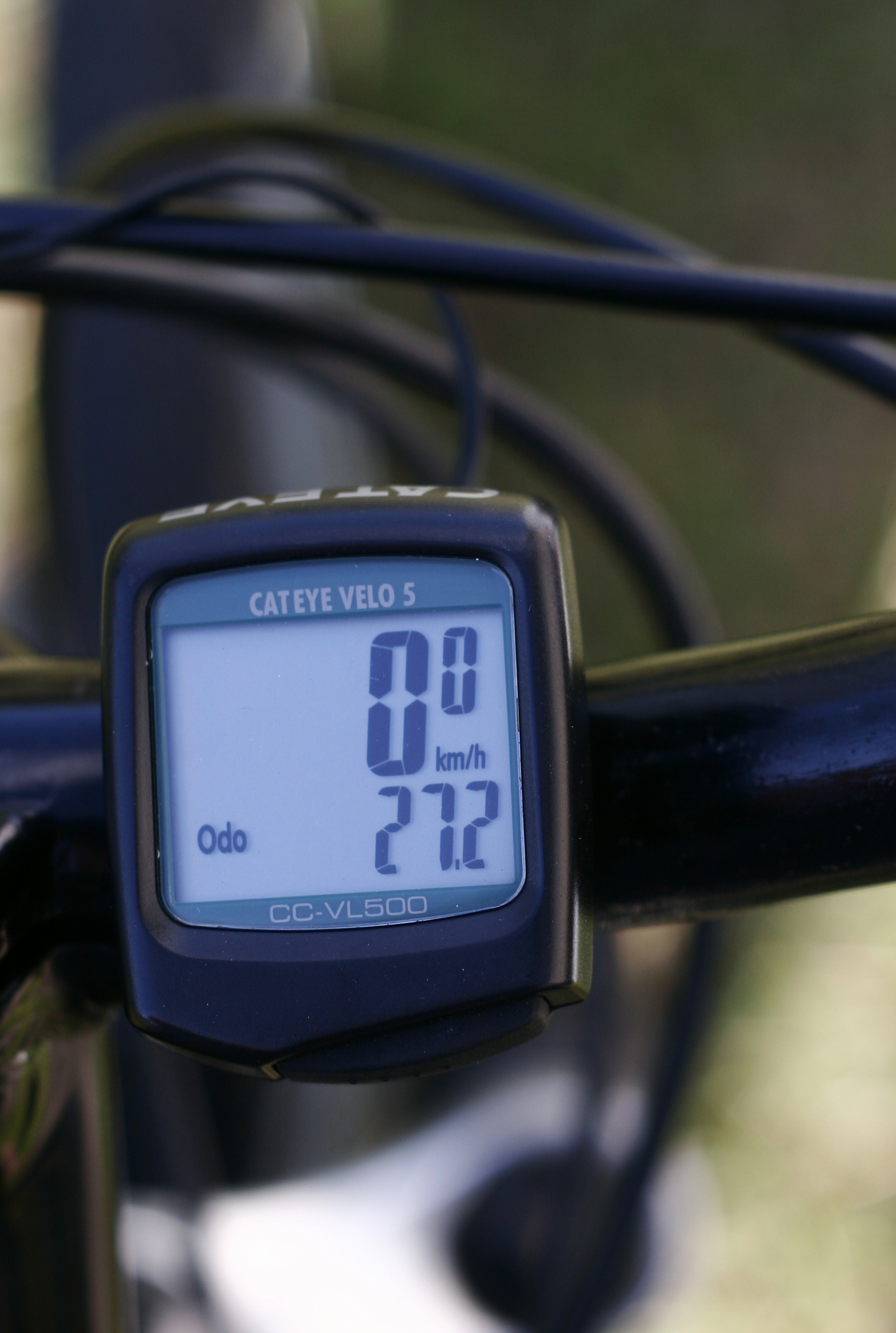
Basic cyclocomputer showing speed and Odometer readings.

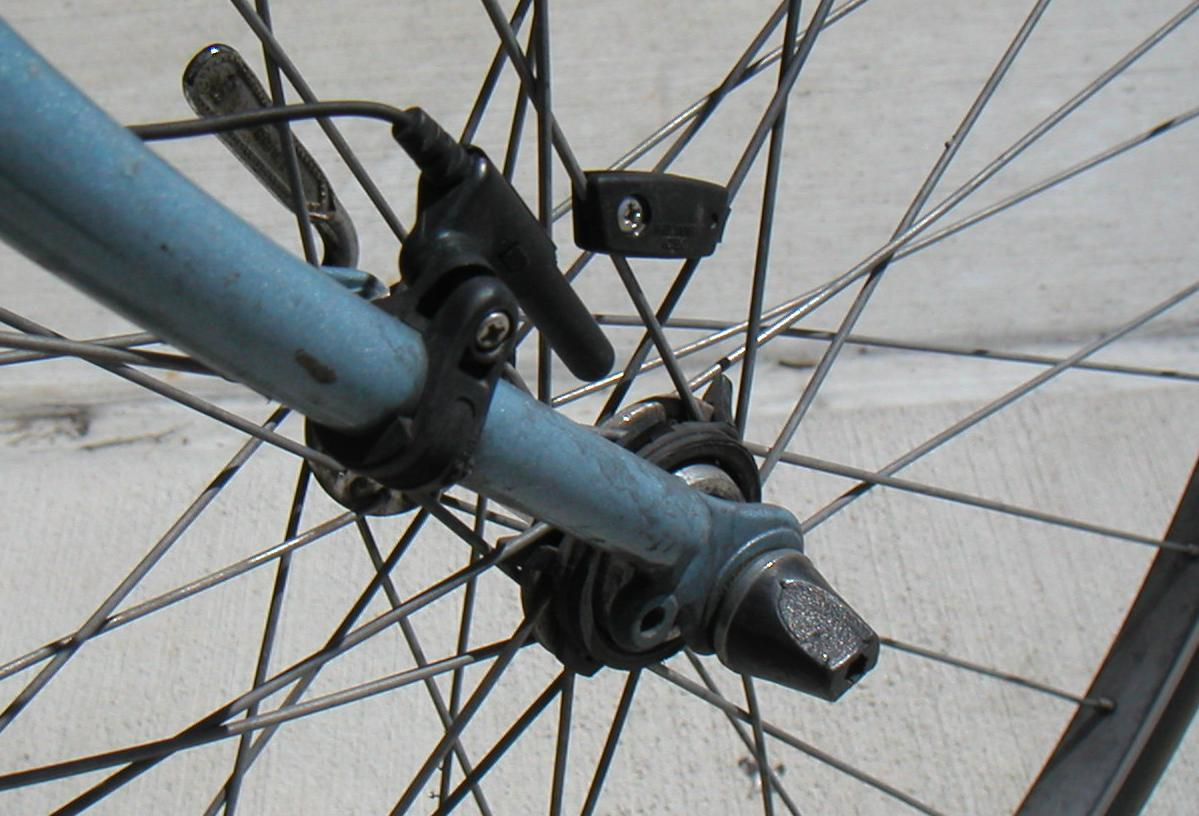
Wired reed switch sensor with spoke mounted magnet.

A cyclocomputer, cycle computer, cycling computer or cyclometer is a device mounted on a bicycle that calculates and displays trip information, similar to the instruments in the dashboard of a car. The computer with display, or head unit, usually is attached to a mount on the handlebars for easy viewing and hands-free navigation. Some GPS watches and smartphones can also be used as display. It can communicate with sensors, including speed sensors, cadence sensors, power meters, and heart rate monitors. Today, it is popular among cyclists to use a smartphone as a cycling computer. However smartphones are not purpose built to be used as cycling computers and have sensitive camera components that risk damage if it encounters prolonged or high amplitude vibrations beyond its design limits. Unlike smartphones, dedicated cycling computers are purpose built for cycling conditions, and have certain advantages, including longer battery life, improved screen visibility under direct sunlight, better sensor signal reliability, lighter weight, and greater resistance to weather and impacts.

== History ==
In 1895, Curtis H. Veeder invented the Cyclometer. The Cyclometer was a simple mechanical device that counted the number of rotations of a bicycle wheel. A cable transmitted the number of rotations of the wheel to an analog odometer visible to the rider, which converted the wheel rotations into the number of miles traveled according to a predetermined formula. After founding the Veeder Manufacturing Company, Veeder promoted the Cyclometer with the slogan, It's Nice to Know How Far You Go. The Cyclometer's success led to many other competing types of mechanical computing devices. Eventually, cyclometers were developed that could measure speed as well as distance traveled.

== Basic operation ==
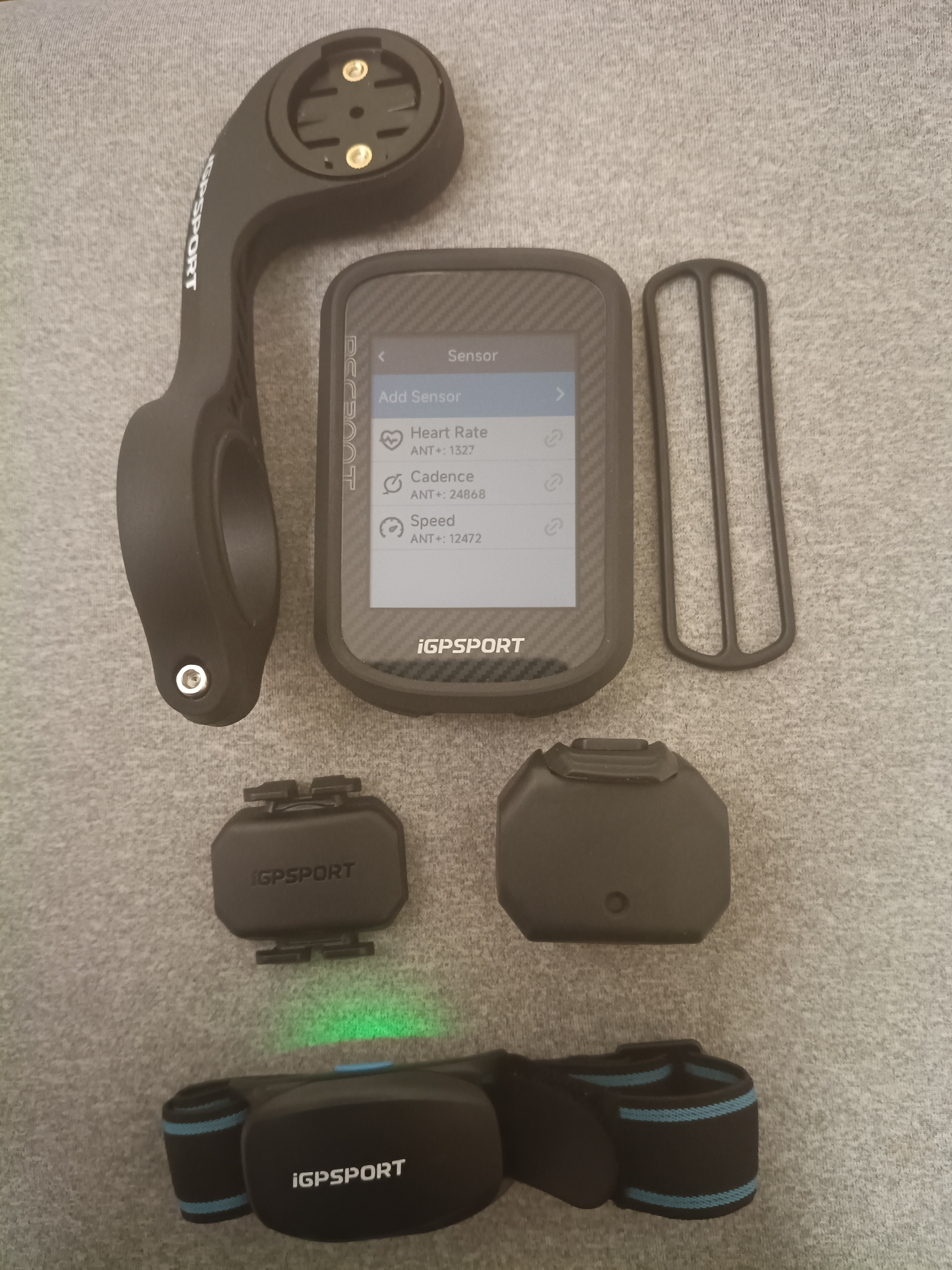
A modern wireless cyclocomputer with its head unit, speed sensor, cadence sensor, heart rate monitor, handlebar mount, and mounting band.

=== Head ===
A basic cyclocomputer with a wheel speed sensor may display the current speed, average speed, maximum speed, trip distance, trip time, total distance traveled, and the current time. More advanced models with additional sensors and storage may display and record altitude, incline (inclinometer), heart rate, power output (measured in watt) and temperature as well as offer additional functions such as pedaling cadence, a stopwatch and even GPS navigation and video data overlay synchronization. They have become useful accessories in bicycling as a sport and as a recreational activity.

The display is usually implemented with a liquid crystal display, and it may show one or more values at once. Many current models display one value, such as current speed, with large numbers, and another number that the user may select, such as time, distance, average speed, etc., with small numbers.

The head usually has one or more buttons that the user can push to switch the value(s) displayed, reset values such as time and trip distance, calibrate the unit, and on some units, turn on a back light for the display. Most displays are navigated by pressing buttons and high-end models use a capacitive touch screen to navigate screens and maps.

=== Speed sensor ===
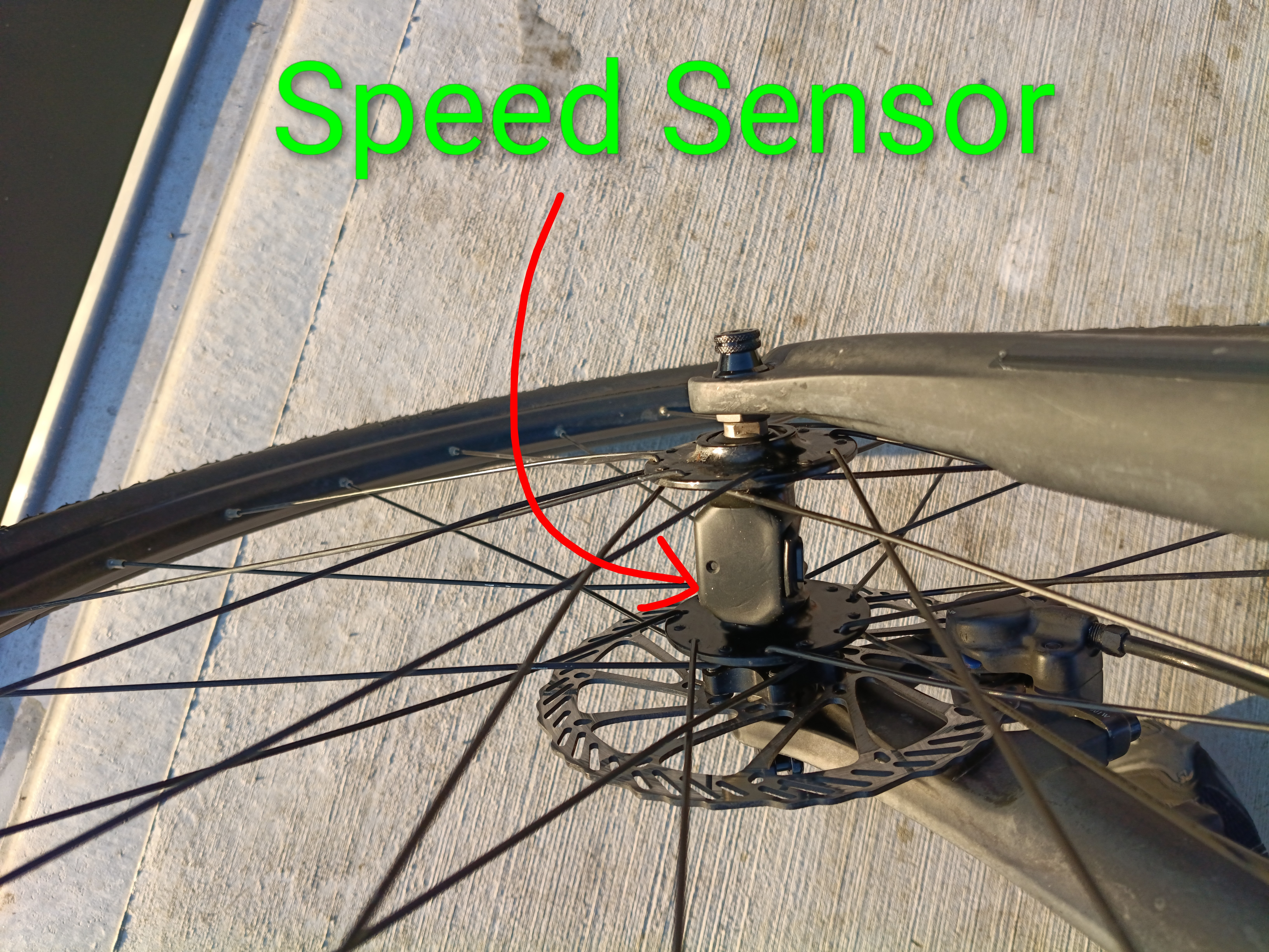
iGPSPORT speed sensor mounted on the front wheel hub of a bicycle.

A speed sensor measures bicycle speed and the distance traveled by detecting wheel rotations. The older, traditional speed sensors have a magnet attached to a spoke of either the front or rear wheel. A sensor based either on the Hall effect, or on a magnetic reed switch, is attached to the fork or the rear of the frame. The sensor detects when the magnet passes once per rotation of the wheel and time stamps or time codes the revolution count. Alternatively, a sensor may be attached to the wheel hub. Distance is determined by counting the number of rotations, which translates into the number of wheel circumferences passed. Speed is calculated from distance against elapsed time period using the circumference of the wheel and the time it took to make one rotation.

=== Cadence sensor ===
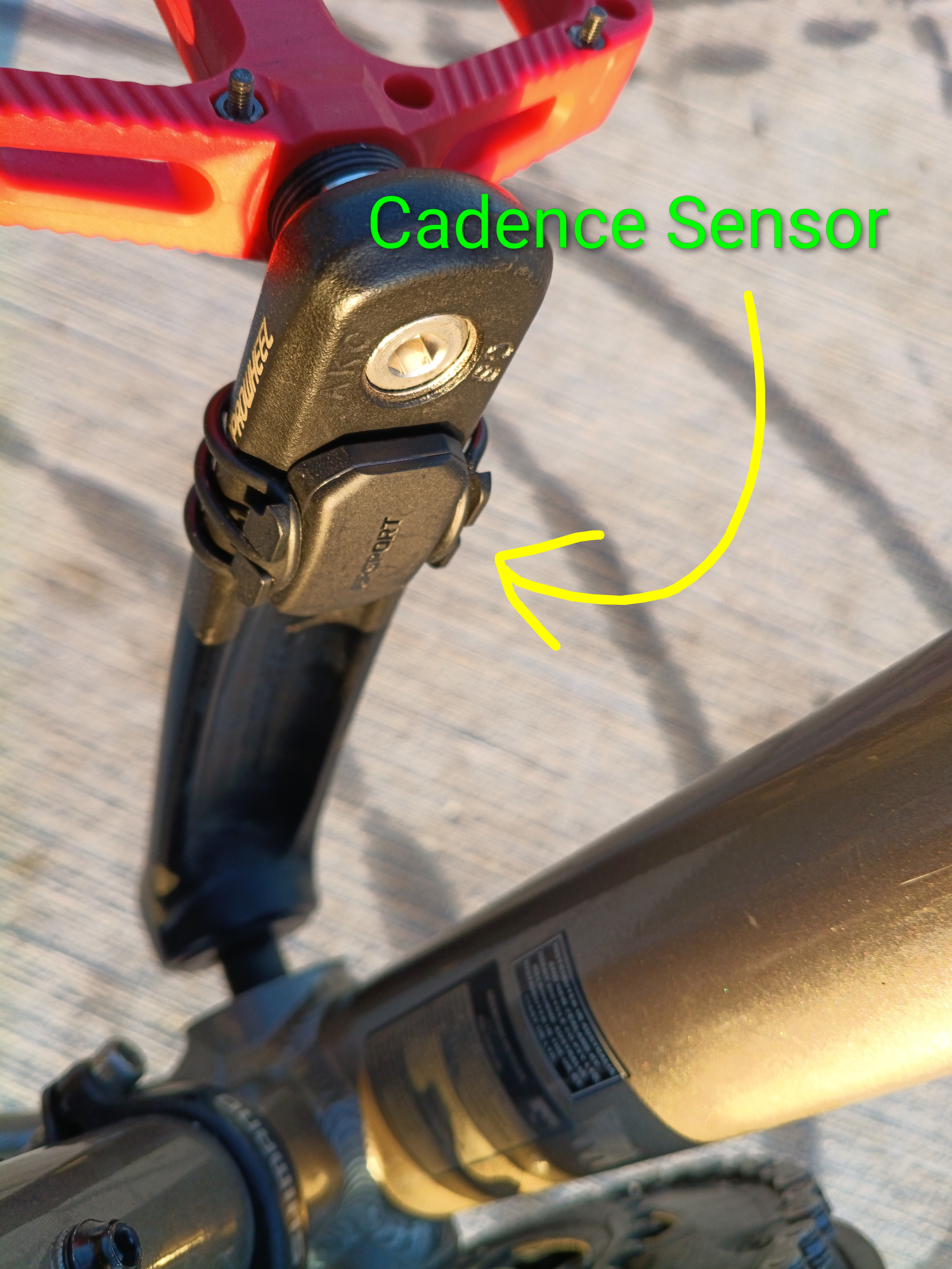
iGPSPORT cadence sensor mounted on the left crank arm of a bicycle.

Cyclists who desire to monitor and maintain their pedalling rate for fitness or training purposes may use a cadence sensor which can communicate with a cycling computer to display the rider's cadence in revolutions per minute (RPM). There are various ways to measure cadence in which can consist of a magnet mounted to the crankarm and a sensor mounted to the frame, or it can just be a single unit attached to the crankarm. The sensor detects each revolution of the crankarm and calculates the pedalling rate per minute.

=== Transmission ===
Some models use a wired connection between the sensor and the head unit. Other models transmit the data wirelessly from the sensor/transmitter to the head unit. Data can be exported to a SD card, computer, or phone and uploaded to an internet web service. Wireless cadence and speed sensors use wireless communication standards ANT + and Bluetooth Low Energy and can directly communicate with a smartphone application that also uses the phone's GPS, barometer, temperature, clock, and other sensors to create a more detailed picture, record, or map.

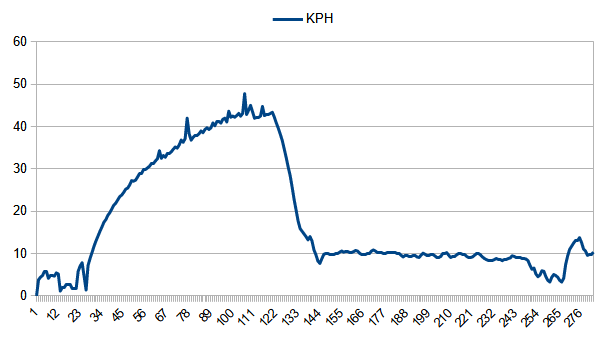
Bicycle speed in km/h

== Calibration ==
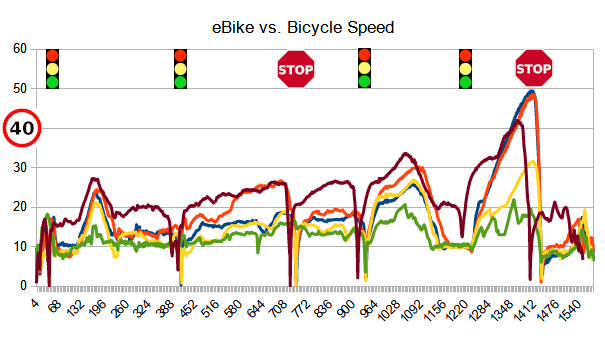
Bicycle speed graph showing calibration error

Once a new computer is installed, it usually requires proper configuration. This normally includes selecting distance units (kilometers vs. miles) and the circumference of the wheel. Since the sensor measures wheel rotation, different wheel sizes will translate to different measures of speed and distance for a given number of rotations.

For more accuracy the bicycle (with the set cyclocomputer) must be ridden by the intended rider over an accurately measured distance. The computer's reading is then compared with the known distance and any necessary corrections made.

== Smartphone vs dedicated cycling computer ==
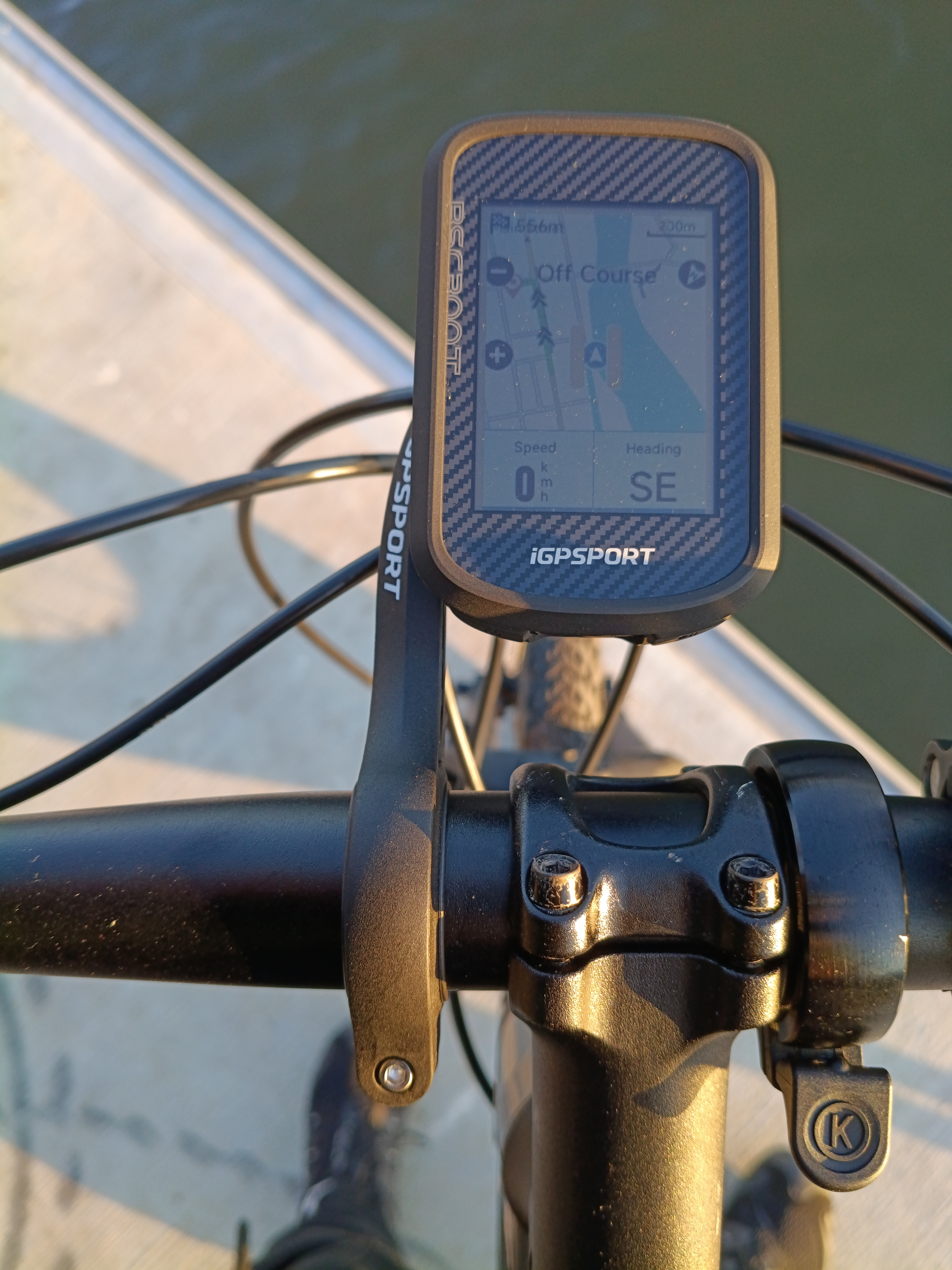
Dedicated cycling computer mounted on an out-front bike computer mount

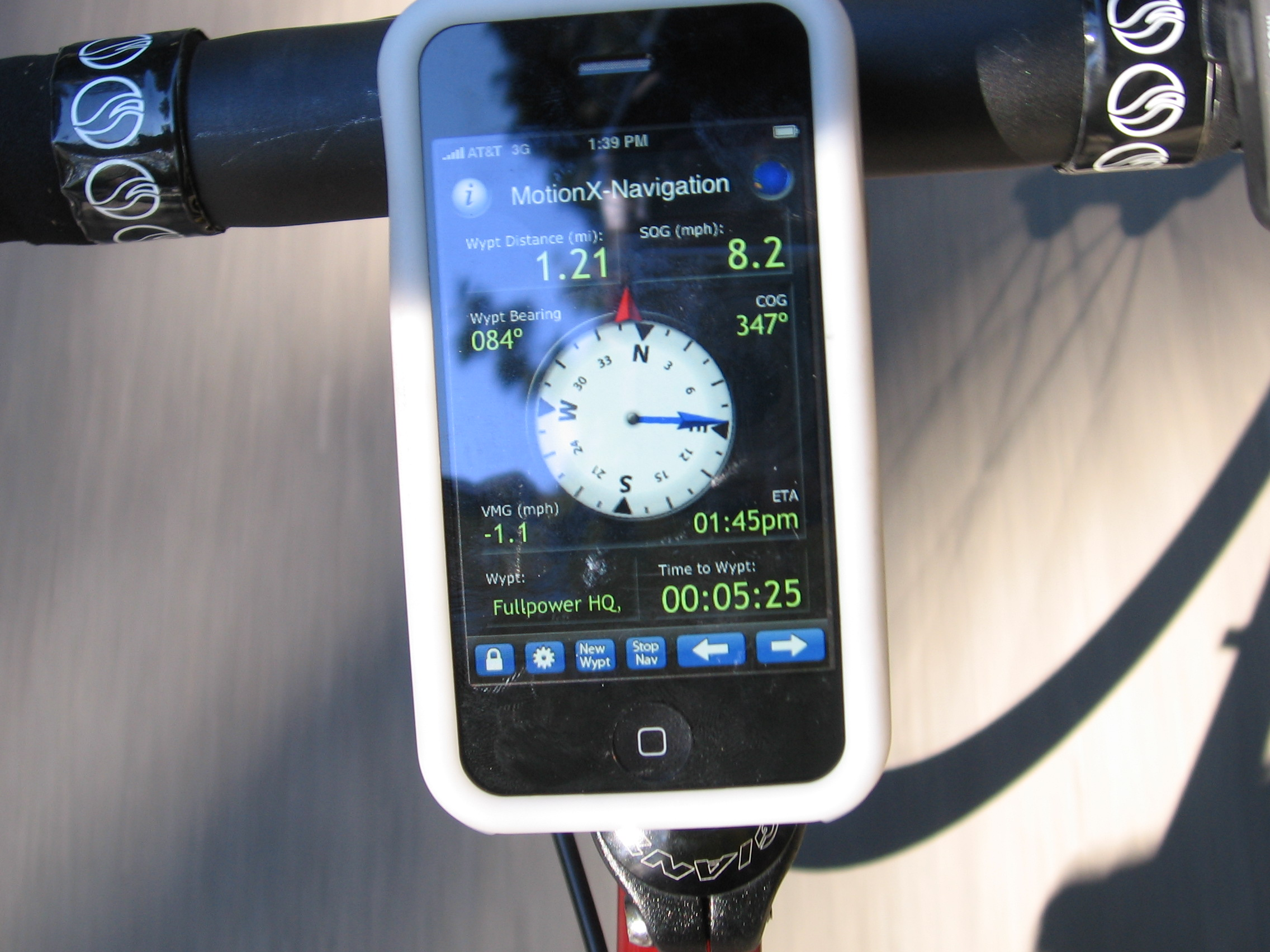
Smartphone used as a cyclocomputer to present data

A smartphone can be used as an alternative to a dedicated cycling computer. Each has its own advantages and disadvantages in terms of convenience, signal reliability, durability, battery life and ease of use.

=== Durability ===
Unlike a smartphone, a cycling computer is generally designed to be more rugged and resistant to bicycle crashes and extreme outdoor temperatures. Smartphones can automatically shut down when it becomes overheated on very hot days to protect their circuits. Unlike dedicated cycling computers, smartphones have sensitive advanced camera components that are not purpose-designed to handle vibrations transmitted from the bike's handlebar on rough roads. As prolonged vibrations risks damaging the smartphone's sensitive components, it is not recommended to mount it on a bike without a mount dampener to reduce vibrations.

=== Ease of use ===
Compared to smartphones, the compact size and physical buttons on a dedicated cycling computer makes it easier to operate while riding. During wet weather, it is harder to operate the touchscreen of smartphones. Cyclists can also find that it is harder to view the screen of smartphones under direct sunlight compared to dedicated cycling computers which has screens that are optimized for outdoor use. However smartphones generally have larger screens and is able to host apps like Komoot, Strava, and Google Maps that are more user-friendly in aiding navigation.

=== Signal reliability ===
Dedicated cycling computers have in-built ANT+ connectivity which is reliable for connecting to multiple compatible devices without signal drop. Smartphones generally rely on Bluetooth connectivity and can struggle with multiple connections and be prone to signal drops and data interruptions. For cyclists wanting to gather training data from multiple sensors, dedicated cycling computers tend to be the more stable option.

=== Battery life ===
Smartphones tend to drain their batteries a lot faster than dedicated cycling computers. GPS and Bluetooth features can generally drain a charged phone within 3 to 5 hours. For long cycling trips, a power bank may be necessary when using a smartphone. Many dedicated cycling computers can typically last 15 to 45+ hours on a single charge, making them suitable for long trips or multi-day events.

=== Convenience ===
Many people already possess a smartphone and so can save money by not having to buy a dedicated cycling computer. Smartphone apps are more interactive and users will find them to be sufficient for navigation. However dedicated cycling computers have significantly longer battery life and reduce the need to carry a power bank or to stop to recharge, especially for longer trips.

== Additional information ==
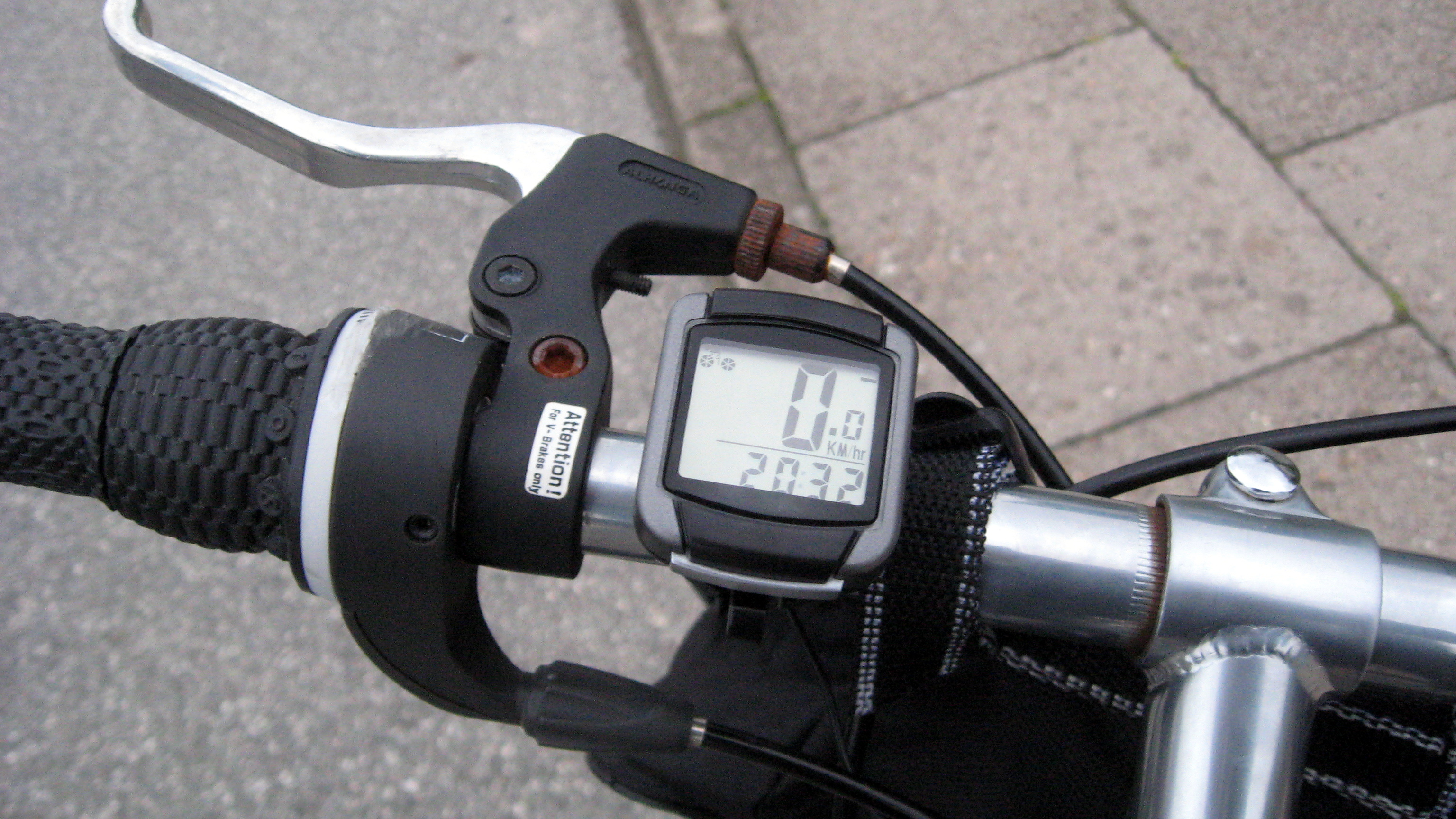
A cyclocomputer displaying speed and time

Besides variables calculated from the rotating wheels or crank, cyclocomputers can display other information.

=== Gear ===
For integrated shifters on racing bicycles, the gear can be read by the computer: Shimano's Flight Deck and Campagnolo's ErgoBrain work with their respective systems to detect the gearing. This allows indirect measurement of cadence. These systems do not have sensors on the crankset or cassette to determine what gear the bicycle is in. They work exclusively with the shifters, which may result in misleading information. Instead of knowing what gear the bicycle is in, they rely on sensing when the cyclist changes gears using sensors in the shifters. If the gear change doesn't actually happen, or the computer's sensors are too sensitive (e.g.: when braking with STI-style shifters), the information displayed is not accurate.

=== Performance ===
With additional sensors, other performance measurements are available:

- A heart rate monitor can be integrated into the computer, using a chest strap sensor.
- A power meter measures power output in watts, using a torque sensor in the bottom bracket, pedals, or rear hub.

=== Environment ===
Some models also have sensors built into the head that measure and display environmental parameters such as temperature and altitude.

=== Cyclist power measurement ===
Some more sophisticated models are able to measure the rider's power in terms of watts. These units incorporate elements that measure torque at the crank, or rear wheel hub, or tension on the chain. This technology began in the late 1980s. (See Team Strawberry for the early development and testing stages of this technology.)

=== Maps ===
Some cyclocomputers (such as the Garmin Edge, trimm One, Wahoo Elemnt Bolt or Hammerhead Karoo) can be loaded with maps and can thus show the rider's position on the map, or provide turn-by-turn directions for a pre-determined route.

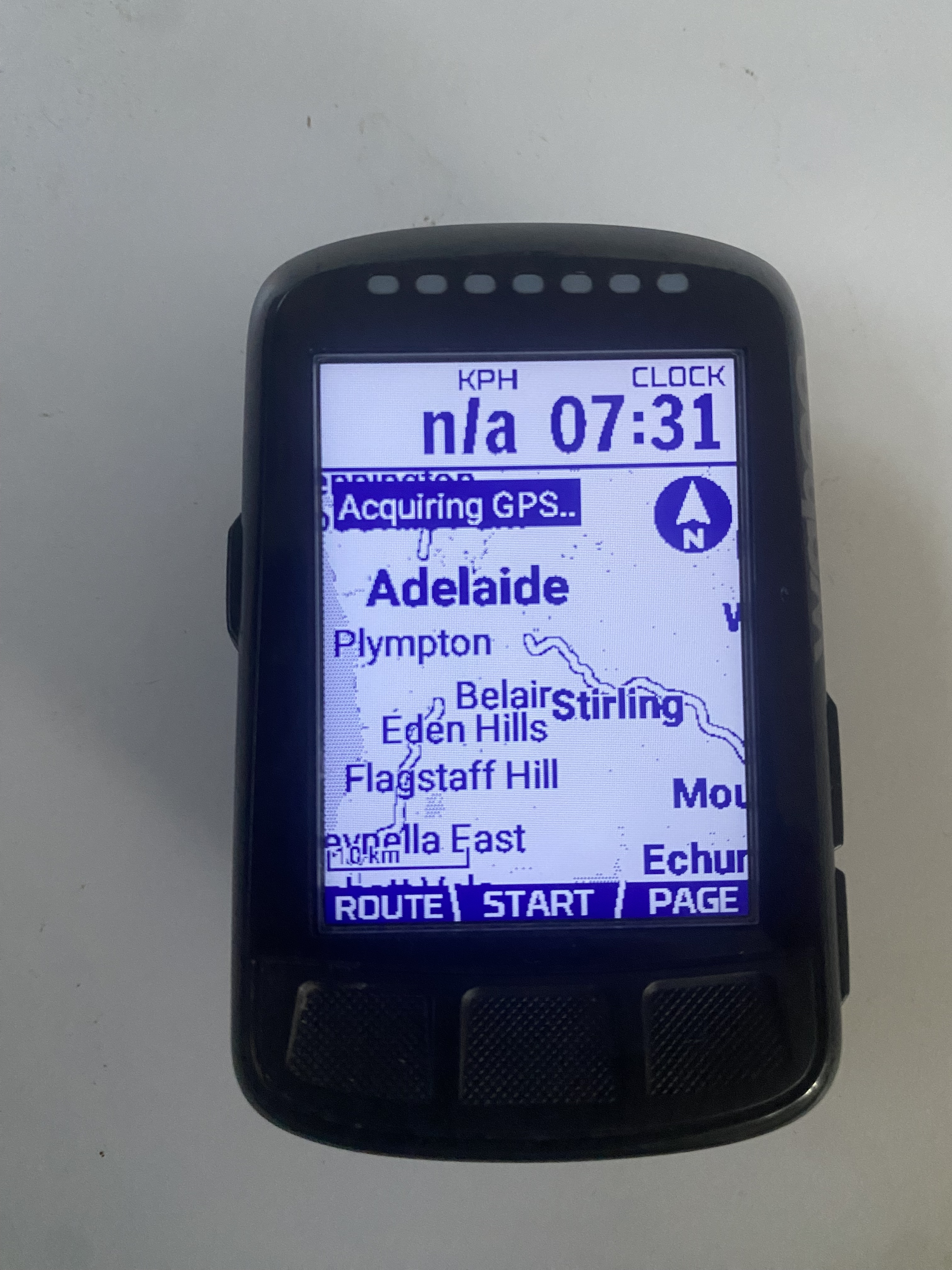
A Wahoo Cyclocomputer on the navigation screen

=== Electric bicycles ===
Most electric bicycles have a microcontroller in the motor controller to calculate input cadence or torque, adjust amperage, control the motors and send the display screen information. Often cyclists can select the level of power assist provided using the computer. The computer also monitors the speed and can deactivate the motor for braking or if required by law (for example, in many countries pedelec bikes cannot use motor assist above 25 km/h).

=== Vibration ===
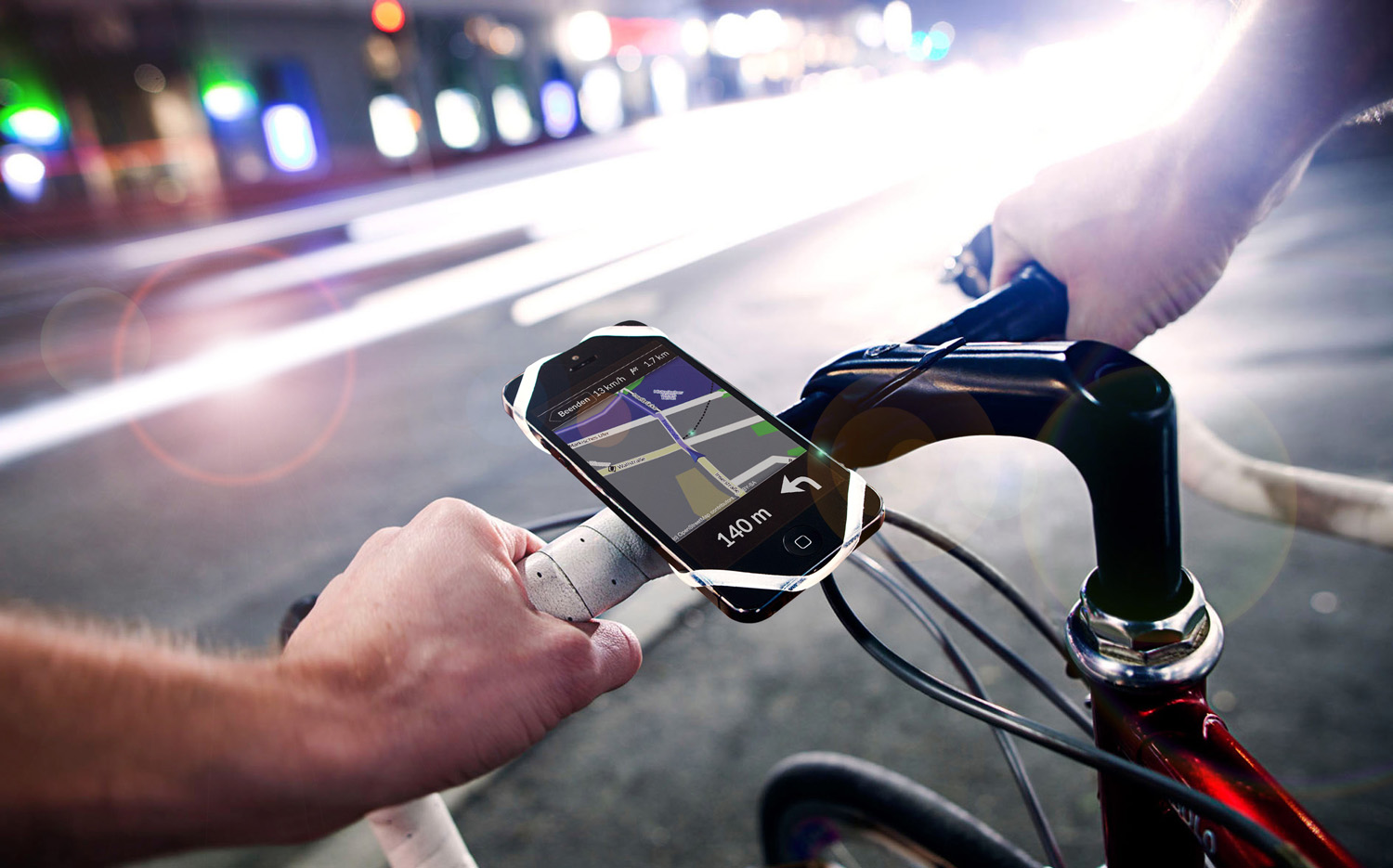
Smartphone mounted on a bike

When a smartphone is mounted on a bike's handlebar without a dampener, it is directly exposed to transmitted vibrations, especially on rough roads. Prolonged vibrations may damage its optical stabilization (OIS), which can result in blurry photos and degraded performance over time. In 2021, Interesting Engineering noted that it had become "known" that sensitive components in smartphone can be damaged by vibrations transmitted from mountain bikes. A dedicated cycling computer, on the other hand, does not have any sensitive camera components and is purpose designed for prolonged vibrations during cycling.

== See also ==
- Outline of cycling
