= Cadence (cycling) =

Rate at which a cyclist turns the pedals

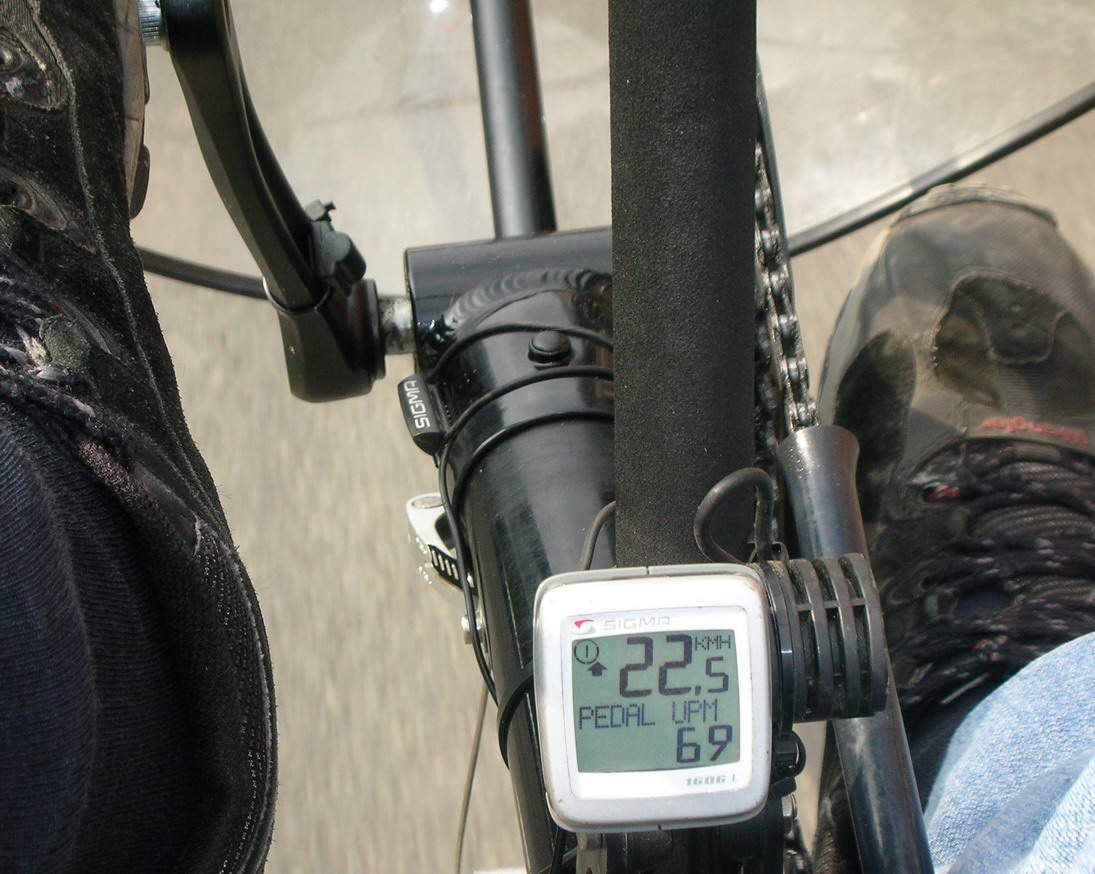
Sigma Sport BC 1606L Cyclocomputer displaying cadence

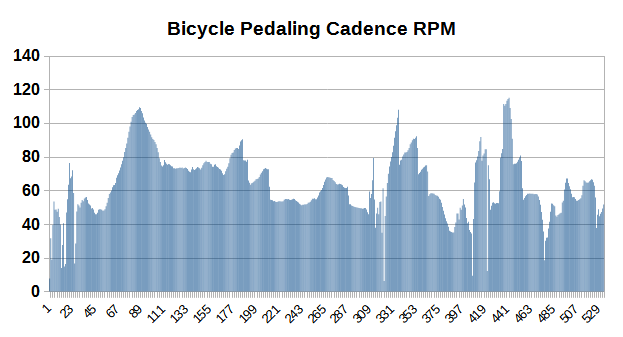
Bicycle cadence graph

In cycling, cadence is a measure of rotational speed of the crank, expressed in units of revolutions per minute (r/min or rpm). In other words, it is the pedalling rate at which a cyclist is turning the pedals. Cadence is related to wheel speed, but it is a separate measurement. The same cadence can produce different speeds and power outputs depending on the selected gear. For example, pedalling at 80 rpm in a high gear would produce more speed but it requires more force being pushed down on the pedals compared to doing 80 rpm in a low gear. Cyclists monitor their cadence to help stay within a target cadence range, which is commonly a high cadence with lower gears to help reduce joint stress, improve pedalling efficiency and to help sustain longer rides.

== Typical cadence ==
Cyclists typically have a cadence at which they feel most comfortable, and on bicycles with many gears it is possible to maintain a preferred cadence at a wide range of speeds.

- 60–80 r/min is a typical cadence for many recreational and utility cyclists
- According to cadence measurement of seven professional cyclists during three-week races they cycle about 90 r/min during flat and long (≈190 km) group stages and individual time trials of ≈50 km. During ≈15 km uphill cycling on high mountain passes they cycle about 70 r/min.

While fast cadence is also referred to as "spinning", slow cadence is referred to as "mashing" or "grinding". Slow cadence is typical when one is cycling with higher gears.

Cyclists choose higher cadence with lower gears to minimise muscular fatigue, and not metabolic demand, since oxygen consumption is lower at cadences 60-70 r/min.

Any particular cyclist has only a narrow range of preferred cadences, often smaller than the general ranges listed above. This in turn influences the number and range of gears which are appropriate for any particular cycling condition.

== Target cadence ==
Cyclists monitor their cadence to stay within their target cadence range. Being able to reach one's optimal cadence consistently and smoothly, helps one to become a faster and more efficient cyclist. Cyclists tend to vary their target cadence range according to their training goals but a cadence of between 80-100 rpm is commonly recommended for both endurance road cycling and general performance. Racers often aim for 90-100 RPM while short, high intensity sprints and attacks would typically involve cadences of 100-120 RPM or higher.

Typically, cyclists experience more muscle strain and increased joint stress when they pedal at a low cadence in a high (hard) gear for prolonged periods. Pedalling in higher gears at low cadence increases the force needed for every pedal stroke, resulting in increased muscular demand and greater stress on knees, hips and back.

In comparison, a high cadence in low (easy) gear reduces the force to push down on the pedals and shifts more of the workload from the muscles to the cardiovascular system. Studies have shown the cycling with a high cadence improves pedalling efficiency by reducing muscle co-activation. However, pedalling technique and pedalling fluidity are also important factors affecting pedaling efficiency. Experienced cyclists tend to shift to higher gears as they increase cadence to maintain an appropriate exercise intensity.

A 2021 systematic review published in the International Journal of Environmental Research and Public Health found that untrained cyclists who pedalled at high cadence at a high intensity tended to struggle more. The study's authors noted that such training impairs the neuromuscular performance much more so than with low cadence. The study's authors suggested that cyclists new to the sport should initially stick to a cadence that feels more natural to them and focus on building up their fitness and endurance before attempting to adopt a higher cadence range.

== Sensors ==
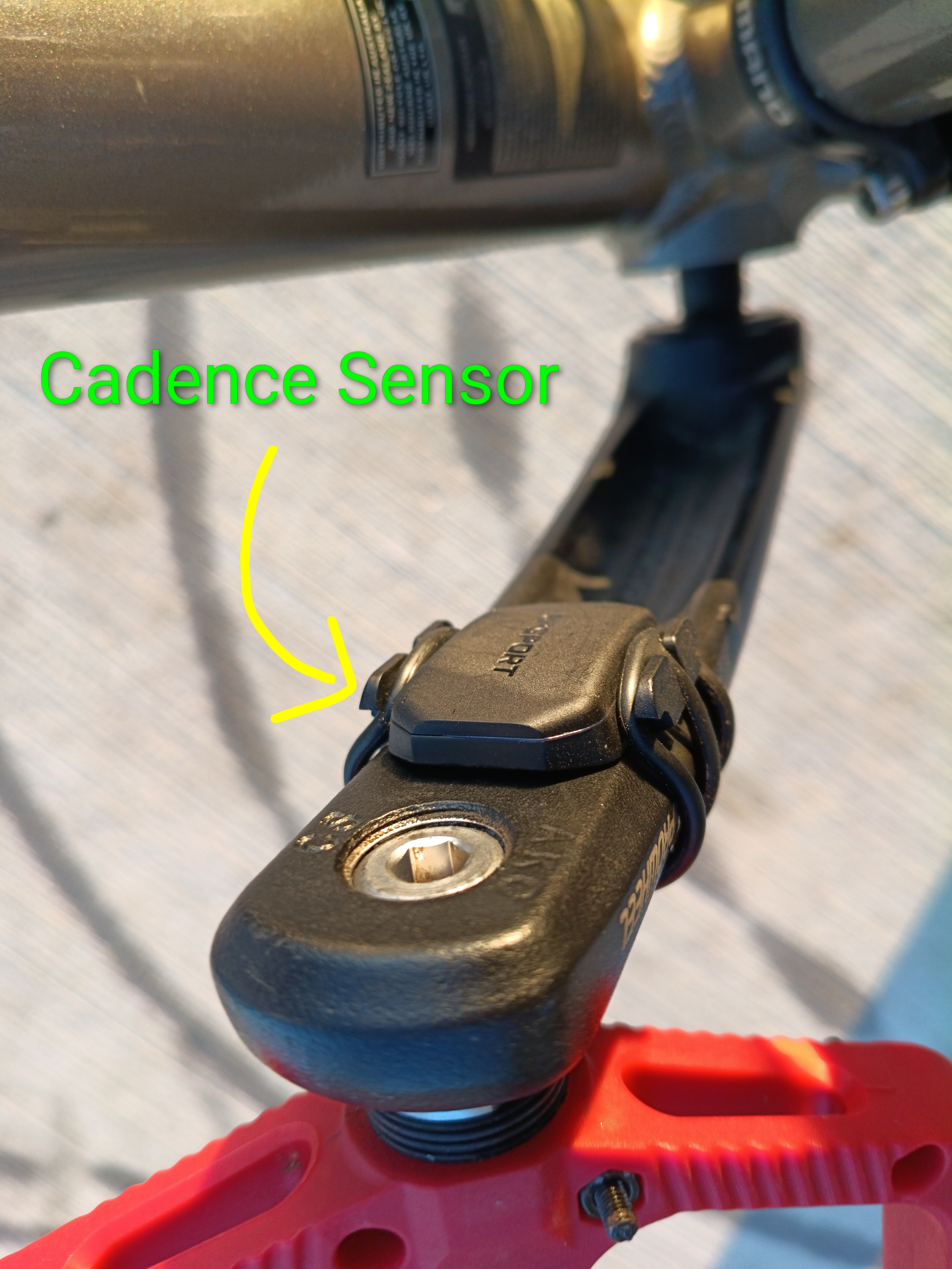
iGPSPORT cadence sensor mounted on the left crank arm of a bicycle.

Cadence can be measured via various types of sensors, for example a simple reed switch and a magnet which detects one revolution each time the crank arm passes a point on the frame, or more advanced sensors based on a force sensor (e.g. pedals), torque sensor (e.g. crank arms) or other types of cycling power sensors.

== Presentation ==
The cadence can be presented on a smartphone via Bluetooth, on an LCD via cable, or on a GPS or cyclocomputer via ANT+, typically mounted on the bicycle's handlebars.

== See also ==
- Cycling power meter
- Bicycle gearing
- Tachometer — a motor vehicle's tachometer is analogous to a bicycle's cadence; they are both measurements of the drive-train's rotational speed prior to the "transmission" (derailleur or hub gear)
