= Phase shift torque measurement =

Phase shift torque measurement involves the use of a shaft, which is either an integral part of the rotating machine under test - such as a turbine, compressor, or jet engine - or positioned between the machine and a dynamometer. The shaft has a pair of identical toothed disks attached at each end and often has a slender portion to enhance its angle of twist. The twist of the shaft can be determined from the phase difference of the magnetically or optically detected wave pattern from each of the disks. Under no-load the waves are synchronised and as a load is applied to the shaft their phase difference increases. The shaft's angle of twist is determined from the measured phase difference. Since the twist of a shaft is linearly proportional to the applied torque within the elastic limit (up to its yield strength), the torque can be calculated using established formulas of torsion mechanics. Phase shift torque meters can measure shaft power to 0.1% accuracy in R & D applications, and to 1.0% when designed for permanent installation, both at confidence levels of 95%.

As of 1991, phase shift torque measurement instrumentation had been installed on gas turbine systems with a total power of 2 GW, with over 2 million operational hours recorded, demonstrating good reliability. These systems operated at speeds of up to 90,000 rpm and achieved power outputs of up to 50 MW.
