= Cycling power meter =

Device on a bicycle that measures the power output of the rider

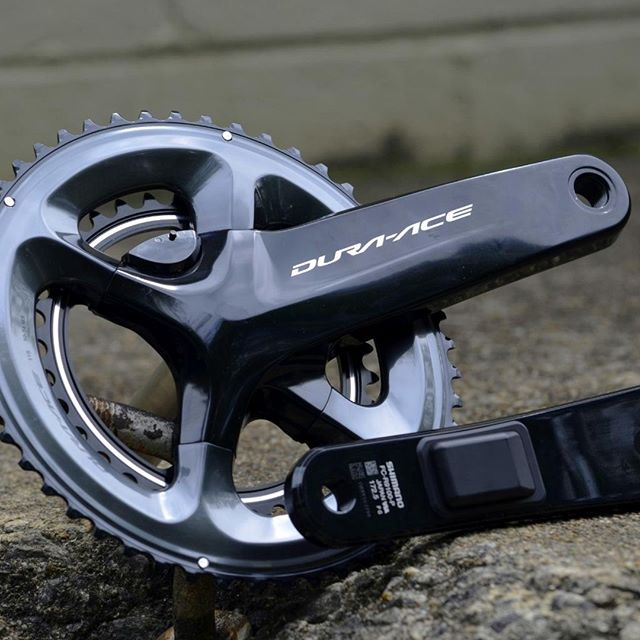
Crank arm based power meter. The small box on the rear of the left crank arm contains the strain gauges.

A cycling power meter is a device on a bicycle that measures the power output of the rider. Most cycling power meters use strain gauges to measure torque applied, and when combined with angular velocity, calculate power.

The technology was adapted to cycling in the late 1980s and was tested in professional bicycle racing i.e.: the prototype Power Pacer (Team Strawberry) and by Greg LeMond with the SRM device. This type of power meter has been commercially available since 1989. Training using a power meter is increasingly popular.

Power meters generally transmit data wirelessly and can be paired to a bike computer, smartphone, or smartwatch. By providing instantaneous feedback to the athlete, and by allowing more precise analysis of rides, power meters can be a useful tool for training.

== Interfaces ==
Older cycling power meters use a set of wires to transmit power information to a computer mounted on the bicycle; this system has a serious disadvantage of having fine electrical cables being run all over the bicycle, making it harder to clean as well as using a fair number of fasteners to hold them up. However, since 2009 there is a general trend to move towards wireless systems. Power meters generally transmit data over ANT+ or Bluetooth Low Energy protocols and can be paired to standard bike computers that display information about the power output generated by the rider.

== Use in training ==
Power meters provide an objective measurement of real output that allows training progress to be tracked very simply—something that is more difficult when using, for example, a heart rate monitor alone. Cyclists will often train at different intensities depending on the adaptations they are seeking. A common practice is to use different intensity zones. When training with power, these zones are usually calculated from the power output corresponding to the so-called lactate threshold or MAP (maximal aerobic power).

Power meters provide instant feedback to the rider about their performance and measure their actual output; heart rate monitors measure the physiological effect of effort and therefore ramp up more slowly. Thus, an athlete performing "interval" training while using a power meter can instantly see that they are producing 300 watts, for example, instead of waiting for their heart rate to climb to a certain point. In addition, power meters measure the force that moves the bike forward multiplied by the velocity, which is the desired goal. This has two significant advantages over heart rate monitors: 1) An athlete's heart rate may remain constant over the training period, yet their power output is declining, which they cannot detect with a heart rate monitor; 2) While an athlete who is not rested or not feeling entirely well may train at their normal heart rate, they are unlikely to be producing their normal power—a heart rate monitor will not reveal this, but a power meter will. Further, power meters enable riders to experiment with cadence and evaluate its effect relative to speed and heart rate.

Power meters further encourage cyclists to contemplate all aspects of the sport in terms of power because power output is an essential, quantitative link between physiological fitness and speed achievable under certain conditions. A cyclist's VO_{2} max (a proxy for fitness) can be closely related to power output using principles of biochemistry, while power output can serve as a parameter to power-speed models founded in Newton's laws of motion, thus accurately estimating speed. The joint application of power meters and power models has led to increasingly more scientific analyses of riding environments and physical properties of the cyclist, in particular aerodynamic drag.

=== Dual-sided power measurement ===
Dual-sided power meters, generally direct applied force or pedal power meters, can measure the power generated individually by the left leg and the right leg. The resulting data allow monitoring of the dominant/non-dominant leg ratio and observe how it varies in relation to different racing and fitness conditions. This can be useful to correct penalizing imbalances and in post-traumatic rehabilitation programs.

== Power meter types ==
Most cycling power meters use strain gauges to measure torque applied, and when combined with angular velocity, calculate power. Power meters using strain gauges are mounted in the bottom bracket, rear freehub, or crankset. Certain newer devices do not use strain gauges and instead measure power through handlebar-mounted units that utilize the principles of Newton's third law by measuring a cyclist's opposing forces (gravity, wind resistance, inertia, rolling resistance) and combining these with velocity to determine the rider's power output.

=== Crank or spider ===
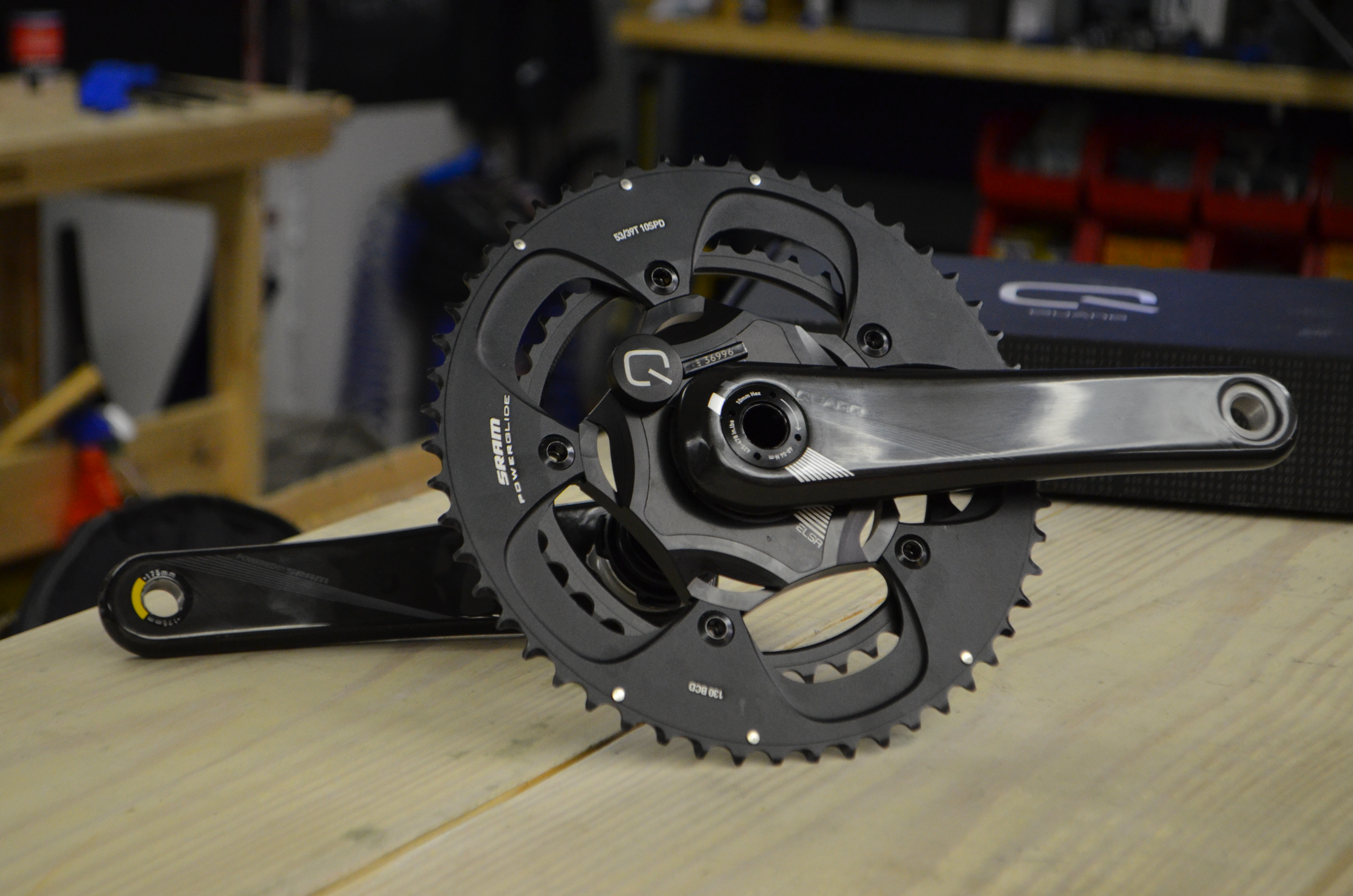
Spider based power meter.

Crank and spider based power meters measure the torque applied through both pedals via strain gauge/s positioned within the crank or crank spider. A calculation of power is derived from the deflection of the strain gauge/s and pedaling cadence. While most crank-based power meters measure the power output of one leg only or need a second sensor to measure the power output of both legs, the spider-based power meters always measure the total power output of both legs.

These units require specific cranks or cranksets but can be relatively simple to interchange between bikes, depending on compatibility.

=== Pedals ===
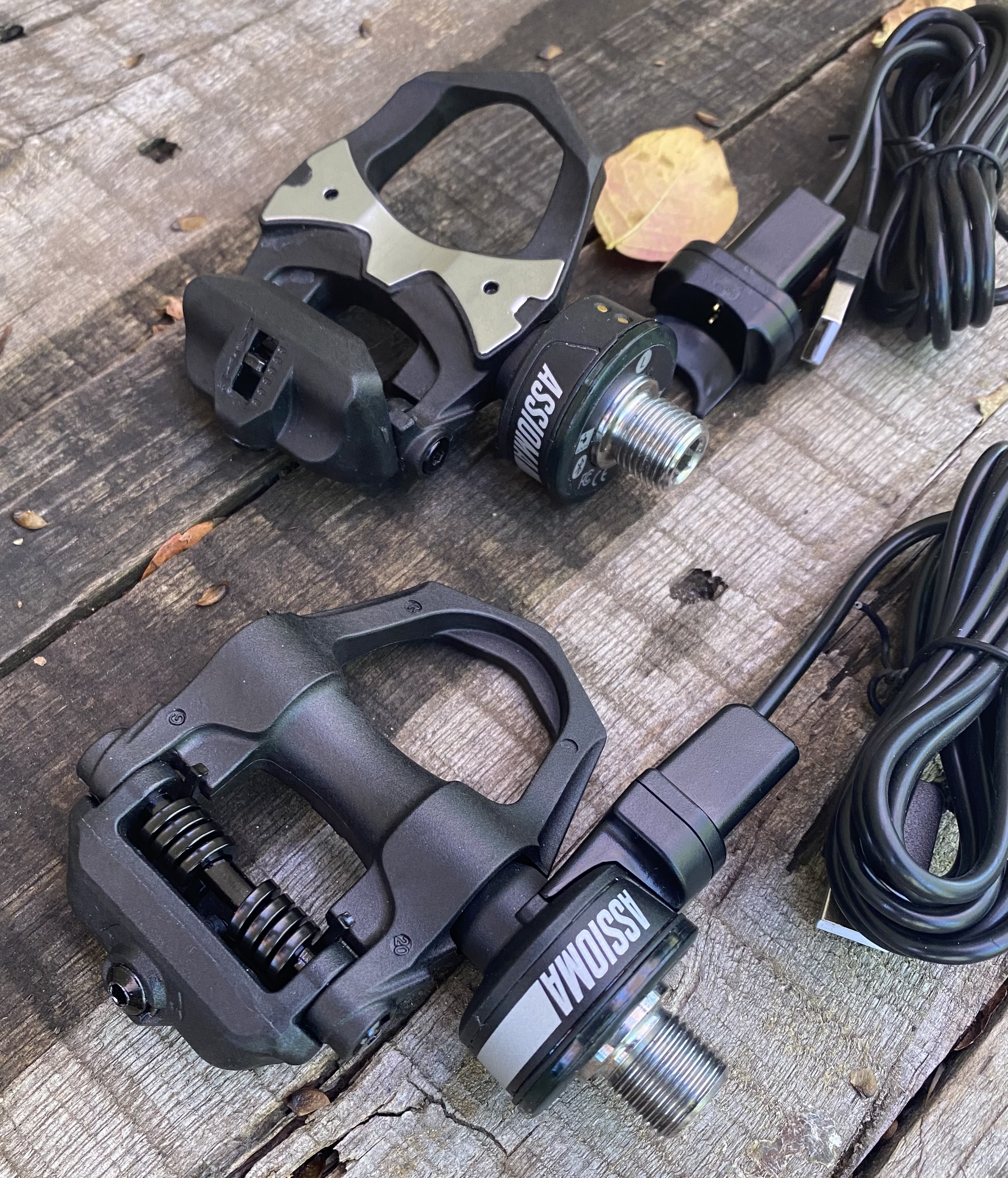
Pedal based power meters.

Pedal-based power meters can be located either in the pedal axle or in the pedal body. This type of cycling power meter measures the cyclist's force exactly where it is applied, through one or both pedals. Power meters with sensors on both pedals can provide a real dual-sided power measurement, that is power data gathered individually on both legs. This feature is useful to observe and correct penalizing differences in performance between legs.

Power meter pedals are easy to install and swap across bikes.

=== Bottom bracket ===
Bottom bracket with connection cables

Bottom bracket power meters rely on the torsional deflection in the BB shaft. This is done by the shaft having a disc at each end with perforations. These perforations are detected using non-contact photo-electric sensors that detect when torque is applied to the left pedal and then doubled. Data is sent digitally to a handlebar mounted computer unit.

These units are difficult to interchange and require a different bottom bracket unit for each bike.

=== Freehub ===
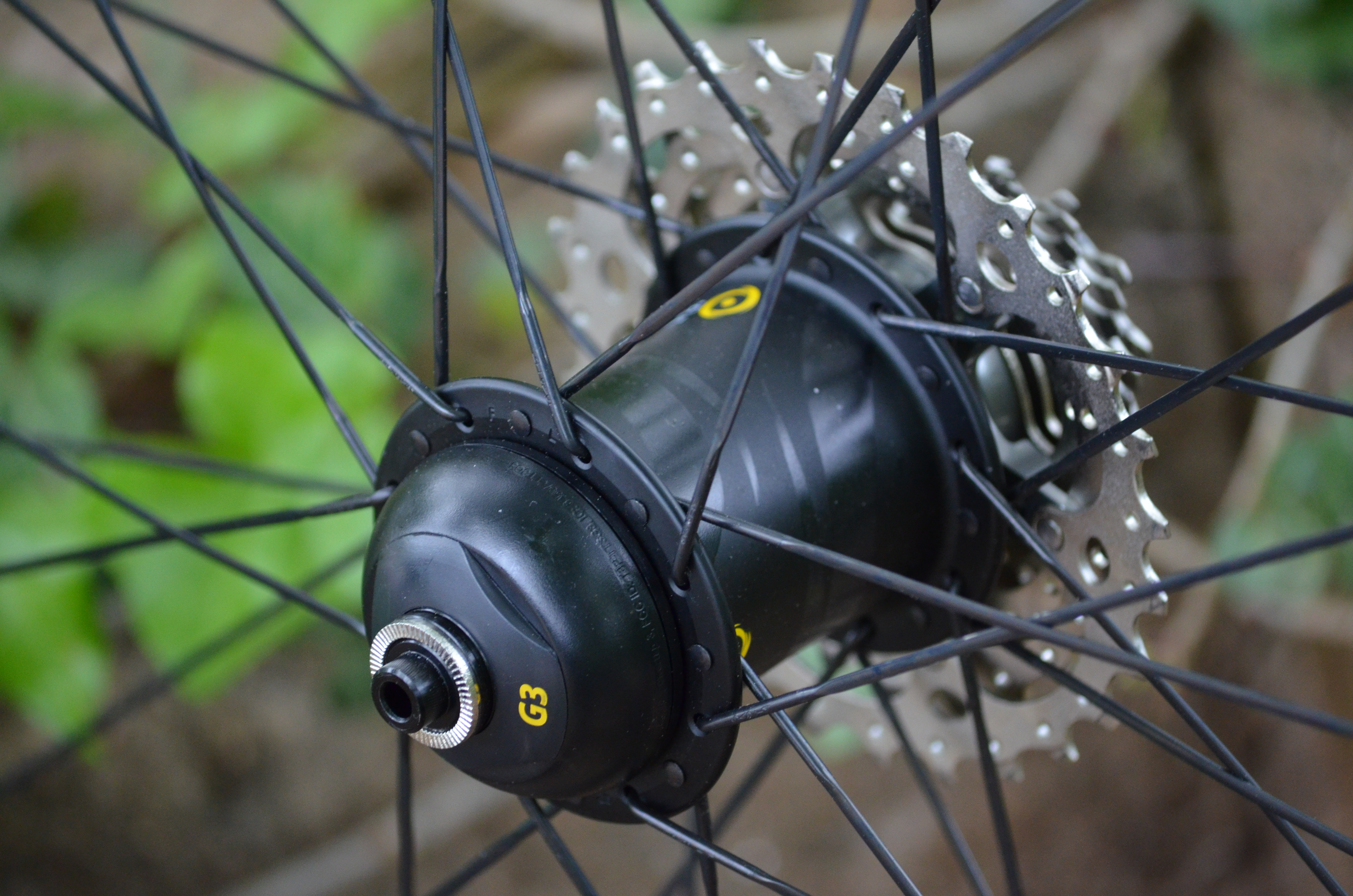
Hub based power meter.

A freehub power meter uses the same strain gauges that are present in the crank power meters, but it is located in the rear wheel hub and measures the power at the rear wheel. The power measured by a freehub power meter will be slightly less than the power measured by a crank-based power meter due to power losses in the chain, pedals, and bottom bracket. Because freehub power meters are built into the rear wheel, it is simple to interchange them among bikes so long as the wheels are compatible.

=== Chain ===
At the heart of chain units is essentially a guitar pick-up that mounts to the cycle's chain stay. The pick-up detects chain vibration from which it calculates chain tension which, along with chain speed, gives power output. Finnish company Polar was the first to bring a chain-based power meter to market.

=== Opposing force ===
Opposing force power meters measure hill slope (gravity), bike acceleration (inertia), and sometimes, wind speed. From this, power can be indirectly calculated.

== Current power meters in the market ==
Hub-based power meter

- PowerTap Hub

Pedal-based power meter

- Favero Assioma
- Favero bePRO
- Garmin Vector, Rally
- Limits
- Look
- Polar/Look Power
- PowerTap Pedals
- Wahoo Speedplay POWRLINK zero

Spider-based power meter

- SRM
- Power2Max
- Quarq Dzero DUB
- SRAM AXS
- FSA Powerbox
- XCadey XPOWER-S, 2XPOWER
- Sigeyi AXO
- Croder S-POWER
- Magene PES P505/P515

Crank-based power meter

- Avio PowerSense
- WATTEAM Powerbeat
- PowerTap ChainRing
- Stages (crank arm)
- 4iiii Precision, Podiiiium (crank arm)
- Pioneer Power
- Verve IbfoCrank
- Rotor
- Magene P325, RIDGE DUAL
- Sigeyi DLS, AXPOWER
- XCadey XPOWER
- InPeak PowerCrank
- Giant Power Pro

Footpod power meter

- RPM2

Opposing force power meter

- PowerPod, measures power by wind resistance and accelerometers, and does not mount to the drivetrain

== See also ==
- Bicycle performance
- Cadence
- Cyclocomputer
- Outline of cycling
