= Schoberer Rad Meßtechnik =

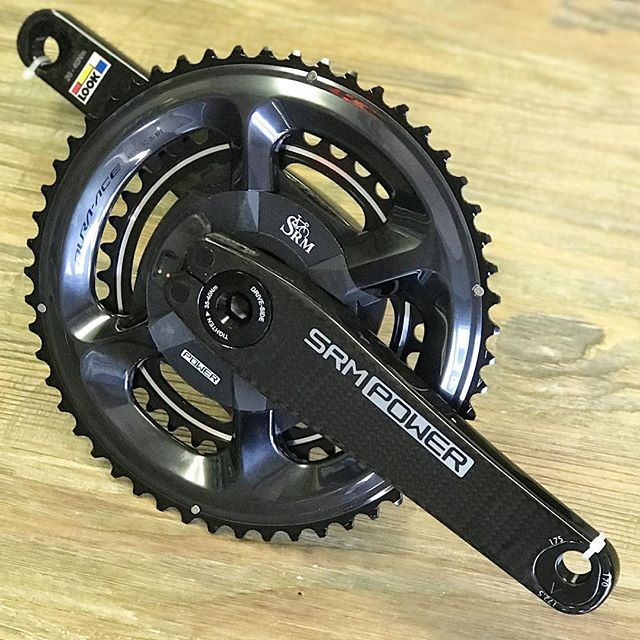
SRM cycling power meter.

Schoberer Rad Meßtechnik (SRM), or Schoberer Rad Messtechnik, is a company which created the first cycling power meter. Formed in 1986 by Ulrich Schoberer in Jülich, North Rhine-Westphalia, Germany, the firm's name literally means "Schoberer’s bike measurement technology." The SRM Powermeter uses built-in strain gauges to determine the power, in Watts, that the cyclist outputs to the bicycle cranks and chainring.
