= Team Strawberry =

Professional bicycle racing team

Team Strawberry was a professional bicycle racing team that participated in experiments on human power/performance conducted by their primary sponsor, Balboa Instruments of Newport Beach, California. The Team was founded in 1988 by team captain Alan R. McDonald. It lasted 2 years for the purpose of testing Bicycle aerodynamics and power, human power measurement/logging, and competing in the 1989 HPV Race Across America (HPV RAAM). McDonald acquired New Zealand rider John Harvey, also an Ultra Marathon cyclist. They were later joined by Greg Ewing and Mike Haluza. During the 1989 RAAM, the team used the hi-tech prototype cyclocomputer called the "Power Pacer" designed by Balboa Instruments. The device measured each rider's individual performance (for the total 2911 miles) in terms of power output (in watts) and calories burned through an output device built into the rear wheel hub.

== Team members ==
The four-man team was led by Ultra Marathon cyclist Alan McDonald (team captain). The four riders were:

- Alan MacDonald of Huntington Beach, California
- Mike Haluza of Irvine, California
- Greg Ewing of Corona Del Mar, California
- John Harvey of Auckland, New Zealand

The team's support crew was led by Crew Chief Karen Anderson, a RAAM veteran. Designer of the Power Pacer and mechanical engineer for Balboa Instruments, Steve Smith was heavily involved with the team performing data acquisition from the Power Pacer units. Smith also joined the support crew for the cross-county race. The team also had a masseuse, a mechanic and a sports physiologist.

=== After RAAM ===
Team Strawberry was formed for the sole purpose of testing the Power Pacer in competition and to compete in the Race Across America. After RAAM, the team disbanded and did not compete together again.

== Team name ==
The team's name originated from an earlier race in which Alan McDonald was dubbed "The Strawberry Kid", when he and his support crew, during a race, paused to track down a group of drunk drivers in the mountain town of Strawberry, Arizona. McDonald contacted the authorities and had to wait for police to arrive before continuing in the competition. Consequently, McDonald lost his place in the race. News of this brief encounter spread and race officials dubbed McDonald as "The Strawberry Kid". Since McDonald organized the RAAM '89 team, team members elected to continue the use of the "Strawberry" name.

== Human Powered Vehicle Race Across America ==
Team Strawberry competed in the Race Across America as the next level of testing for the prototype "Power Pacer" Cycling power meter. The cross-country HPV (Human Powered Vehicle) RAAM was designed to be a platform for technology advancement in cycling aerodynamics and human powered propulsion, so it was logical to use the race as a testing ground. The race was basically a transcontinental four-man individual time trial relay race in which riders could rotate as often as they felt was necessary to maintain the highest possible average speed. All teams started together but finished many hours apart by the end of the 2,911 mile sprint. Today, team members can ride together to take advantage of drafting whereas in the 1989 race there could only be one rider at a time. In the 1989 race, riders would take turns, each person riding as fast as possible until his average speed began to decay, marking the logical time to switch riders. Today's drafting allowance has enabled faster average speeds in the team divisions. The data acquired each rider's individual power output and calorie expenditure, as well as the overall total as a team.

== Vehicles ==
- The basic concept was that anything goes as far as the type of vehicle, as long as it was both bicycle based, and 100% pedal power propelled by human force with no artificial assist except for aerodynamic aids.
- Teams could make minor modifications as long as the over-all design remained the same from start to finish.
- Emphasis was on the bike design rather than the rider. Team Strawberry opted for the lighter and more reliable upright bicycle with a simple handlebar-mounted fairing. They claimed third place in the 1989 race, crossing the country in just over six days.

== Teams to continue in RAAM ==
Notably, Team Strawberry made significant contributions to the sport of bicycle racing. Their participation in cyclist power measurement paved the way for further advancement in the technology. Furthermore, their participation along with the other teams entered in the 1989 Race Across America changed the structure of the race by opening the door to further team competition in a race that was designed to be a solo competitor event. This marked the beginning of team competition in the annual race and today, along with the solo category, team categories have been expanded considerably. Teams can be 2 or 4 members. Corporate teams can be larger.

== Teams: best times ==
1989 RACE ACROSS AMERICA, HPV DIVISION (4-man teams):

1. Team Lightning/recumbent bike, fully enclosed HPV... 5: 01: 08 / 24.02 mph average. (James Penseyres, Pete Penseyres, Michael Coles, Bob Fourney)
2. Team Chronos/standard bike + Fairing with integrated body wrap... 6: 07: 40 / 19.20 mph average. (Thane Hall, Randall Olsen, Brian Spence, Paul Anderson)
3. Team Strawberry/standard bike + Fairing only 6: 14: 03 / 18.41 mph average. (Alan McDonald, John Harvey, Greg Ewing, Mike Haluza)

== Devices: Power Pacer, Power Tap, SRM, Polar S-170 and Max One ==
The team was sponsored by Power Pacer, a human power measurement device that consisted of a rear-wheel hub, a frame mounted sensor and a handlebar mounted processor. McDonald struck a sponsorship deal with Balboa Instruments, maker of the device, whereby the team would test the product during the company's product research and development. As a condition of the sponsorship agreement, McDonald agreed to have the team use the equipment during the actual cross-country race which limited the team to spoked wheels rather than the faster and more efficient Time trial bicycle setup with Disk Wheels as used by the other teams. This hurt Team Strawberry in the competition by reducing their average speed, but the sacrifice contributed to the advancement of the technology.

Balboa Instruments released the Power Pacer hub shortly after Look’s Max One. Neither one of these early devices was a marketing success due to their high cost and complexity. Power-based training had been possible in labs only with special ergometers mounted to stationary bikes until 1988 when Balboa Instruments and several other companies began to develop the technology for "on-the-road" use. Another system, the SRM, actually started the concept of measuring rider output on the road. It was shortly followed by the Power Pacer (Balboa Instruments) and LOOK Max One hubs. The SRM enjoyed greater publicity when it was embraced by international cycling federations, as well as world-famous Tour de France winner Greg LeMond. The research on cyclist power measuring devices performed by Team Strawberry and Balboa Instruments started the trend that resulted in the more affordable Power Tap (1998, Tune Corp., purchased by Graber Products in late 2000) and Polar S-710 (2001).
