= Machine-tool dynamometer =

A machine-tool dynamometer is a multi-component dynamometer that is used to measure forces during the use of the machine tool. Empirical calculations of these forces can be cross-checked and verified experimentally using these machine tool dynamometers.

With advances in technology, machine-tool dynamometers are increasingly used for the accurate measurement of forces and for optimizing the machining process. These multi-component forces are measured as an individual component force in each co-ordinate, depending on the coordinate system used. The forces during machining are dependent on depth of cut, feed rate, cutting speed, tool material and geometry, material of the work piece and other factors such as use of lubrication/cooling during machining.

== Types ==
1. Lathe
2. Drill
3. Milling
4. Grinding
