= Macneill's road indicator =

Tool for measuring force necessary to draw a carriage

Macneill's Road Indicator was a dynamometer for ascertaining the force necessary to draw a carriage over different kind of roads and pavements. It was developed by John Benjamin Macneill in the late 1820s.

== Prototype ==
Macneill's road indicator was completed according to drawings laid before and authorised by the Parliamentary Commissioners in 1829. It was first used on the road between London and Shrewsbury. A description of and the method of using it was included the Sevent report of the Commissioners(1830).

== Improved version ==
Macneill made further improvement in the road indicator enable it to measure bearing, inclination, time and distance travelled. In April 1833 it was used in experiments with an iron boat on the Paddington Canal for the purpose of ascertaining the law of resistance, or force of traction, at different degrees of velocity.

It was demonstrated in Regent's Park in presence of Charles Gordon-Lennox, 5th Duke of Richmond and Sir Henry Parnell 18 May 1833, and two days after reported to the select committee of the House of Lords appointed to examine the turnpike returns with description and measured data for the period 1829 - 1832. The experiments showed that the force of traction was nearly in an exact proportion to the hardness of the road.

In 1835 Macneill gave evidence to the House of Common on the relative advantages of the telegraph, elliptical and other springs as regards the draught of carriages.

== See also ==
- Peirameter
