= Water brake =

Arrangement of braking mechanism

Schematic water brake on a dynamometer

A 4-minute ‘how-it-works video’ tutorial explaining how engine-dynamometer water-brake absorbers work.

A water brake is a type of fluid coupling used to absorb mechanical energy and usually consists of a turbine or propeller mounted in an enclosure filled with water.

As the turbine or propeller turns, mechanical energy is transferred to the water due to turbulence and friction. The shock caused by the acceleration of the water as it passes from pockets in the stator to the pockets in the spinning rotor requires energy. That energy heats the water due to the friction as the water moves through the water brake. Almost all of the horsepower of the system turning the rotor (usually an internal combustion engine) is converted into a temperature change of the water. A very small amount of energy is taken by the bearings and seals within the unit. Therefore, water must constantly move through the device at a rate proportional to the horse power that is being absorbed. Water temperature exiting the unit must be kept under 120–160 °F (49–71 °C) to prevent scale formation and cavitation. The water enters in the center of the device and after passing through the pockets in the stator and rotor exits the outside of the housing through a controlled orifice. The amount of loading is dependent on the level of water inside the housing. Some water brakes vary the load by controlling the inlet water volume only and have a set outlet orifice size depending on the desired hp to be absorbed and some control both input and output orifices at the same time which allows greater control over outlet water temperatures. The housing is vented to the outside to allow air to displace the water as the water level in the unit rises and falls.

The amount of torque that can be absorbed is defined by the equation T=kN^{2}D^{5} where T = torque, N = RPM, D = the diameter of the rotor and k = a constant dependent on the size and shape and angle of the rotor/stator pockets.

Systems that require the torque of the system under test to be measured typically use a strain gauge mounted on a torque arm that is attached to the housing perpendicular to the input shaft. The housing/stator is mounted on roller bearings and the rotor is mounted on roller bearings within the housing/stator so that it can turn independently of the rotor and frame. The strain gauge connects the torque arm to the frame assembly and keeps the housing from spinning as housing tries to turn in the same direction of the turbine. (Newton's third law).

The amount of resistance can be varied by changing the amount of water in the enclosure at any one time. This is accomplished through manual or electronically controlled water valves. The higher the water levels within the brake the greater the loading. Water brakes are commonly used on some forms of dynamometer but have also been used on railways vehicles such as the British Advanced Passenger Train.

== Hydrokinetic construction (torque absorption) ==
The Froude waterbrake is based on hydrokinetic construction or (torque absorption).

The machine consists of an impeller (rotor) which accelerates water outwards by its rotation. The water has its velocity changed by a stator which causes the water to be returned to the inner diameter of the rotor. For a given mass of water, this velocity change yields a corresponding momentum change – and the rate of change of momentum is proportional to a force. This force acting at some point within the rotor and stator is a distance from the shaft centerline, and a force multiplied by a distance produces torque.

== See also ==
- Torque converter
