= Dynamic torque sensor =

Torque measurement device

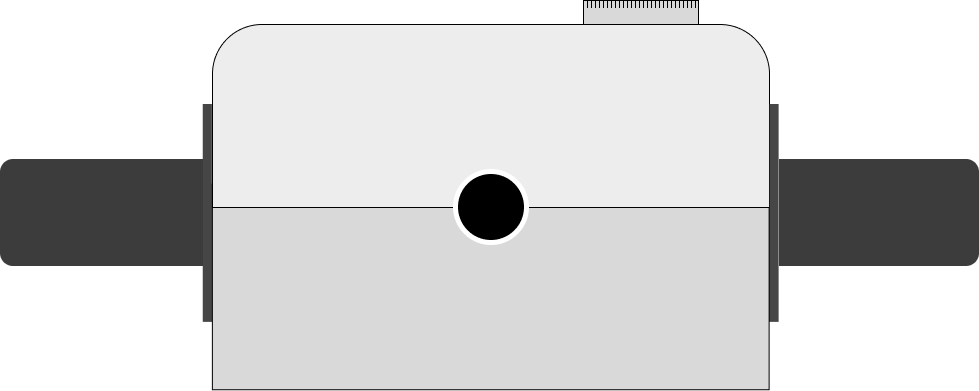
Dynamic torque sensor

A dynamic torque sensor is an electronic measurement device used to measure and record torque variations in rotating or dynamically moving mechanical systems. As compared to static torque sensors, which measure torque when the object is stationary, dynamic torque sensors specifically measure rapid fluctuations. They report torque variations in real time.

These sensors are used where control and monitoring of torque are required, and they play a role in operational safety. They help determine the efficiency of mechanical components such as motors, drive shafts, and rotating equipment.

Dynamic torque sensor uses principles such as strain gauge technology, magnetoelastic effects, optical sensing, or piezoelectric effects.

Mechanical systems have diversified in design and operating conditions. Therefore, dynamic torque sensors are now applied in more sectors than before. This includes automotive, aerospace, renewable energy, industrial automation, and robotics. In these sectors, dynamic torque sensors are employed to monitor system efficiency and safety parameters.

== Working principle ==
A dynamic torque sensor uses measurement principles such as strain gauge technology, magnetoelastic effects, optical sensing, and piezoelectric effects.

=== Strain gauge technology ===
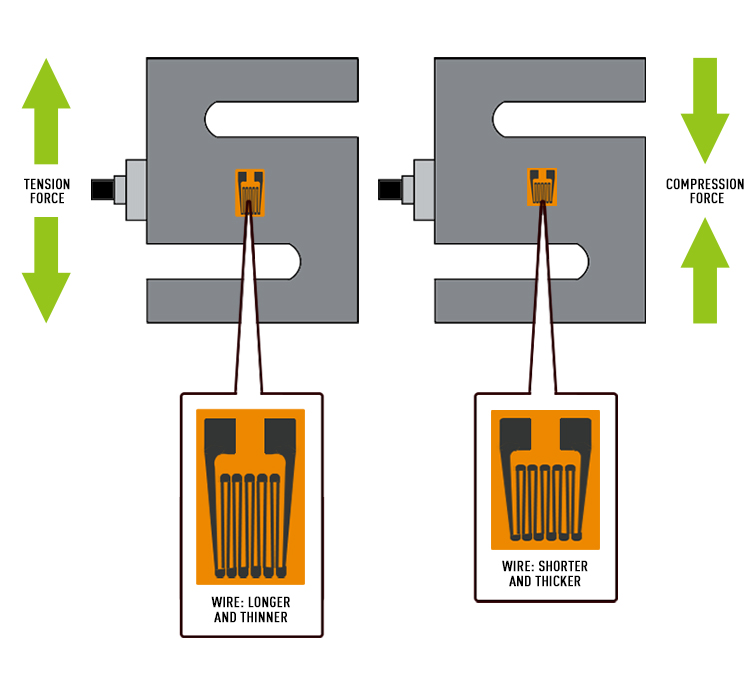
Strain gauge deformation under tension (left) and compression (right)

Strain gauges deform when torque is applied. This results in change in electrical resistance proportional to the torque, allowing the measurement of strain. These sensors claim an accuracy of ±0.3% of full scale in laboratory tests and are commonly integrated into measurement rigs.

=== Magnetoelastic effects ===
These sensors use changes in magnetic properties when torque is applied. The magnetoelastic principle enables non-contact torque measurement. Manufacturers report that magnetoelastic sensors can operate in high-temperature or high-vibration conditions with minimal maintenance.

=== Optical sensing ===
Optical torque sensors utilize light-based techniques, namely interferometry or phase shift measurements, to detect torque. They provide high sensitivity, immunity to electromagnetic interference, and minimal mechanical interference.

=== Piezoelectric effects ===
Animated schema of the piezoelectric effect

By using piezoelectric crystals, these sensors create an electric charge when mechanical stress is applied thus capturing high-frequency dynamic torque events.

== Types of dynamic torque sensor ==
A dynamic torque sensor can be classified according to its sensing technology and application.

Firstly, rotary torque sensors measure torque on rotating shafts. They use strain gauges or magnetoelastic technology and are used in engines, gearboxes, and drive shafts.

Secondly, non-contact torque sensors measure torque without physical contact. They use magnetoelastic or optical techniques thus reducing wear and maintenance requirements. They are especially helpful in harsh or high-speed environments.

Lastly, reaction torque sensors use strain gauge technology and are engineered to measure torque without rotation. They are used in torque testing benches and component validation setups.

== Applications ==
Dynamic torque sensors are used in various industries due to their precision and reliability. They are used in automotive industry where engine and transmission testing, vehicle dynamics analysis, and development of electric vehicle (EV) drivetrains is done.

They are further used in aerospace where aircraft engines, propellers, and rotor systems are tested, ensuring safety of aerospace components.

They are also used in monitoring torque in wind turbines and tidal energy systems, increasing their efficiency.

Industrial automation and robotics uses them in monitoring torque in robotic joints, industrial machinery, and automation systems. Studies have shown that torque monitoring can detect abnormal loads in robotic joints, potentially preventing failures.

== Technical specifications and performance criteria ==
Dynamic torque sensors are distinguished by their technical specifications and performance criteria:

- Sensitivity: small changes in torque are detected by sensor.
- Accuracy: degree to which sensor measurements reflect true torque values.
- Resolution: smallest detectable increase in torque.
- Frequency response: range of frequencies over which the sensor accurately measures dynamic torque.
- Temperature stability: accurate measurements maintained by sensor across varying temperatures.
- Calibration standards: adherence to internationally recognized calibration standards (e.g., ISO, ASTM) ensuring consistent measurement accuracy.

== Calibration and maintenance ==
Proper calibration and maintenance of dynamic torque sensors is vital to guarantee their accuracy over time. Both static and dynamic calibration methods are included to maintain sensor accuracy. Furthermore, compliance to recognized calibration standards, such as ISO and ASTM would ensure consistency across measurements. Regular inspection, cleaning, recalibration, and proper handling is also crucial to extend the lifespan of the sensor.

== See also ==
- Torque wrench
- Torque converter
- Torque screwdriver
