= Clean Air Act (United States) =

1963 US federal law to control pollution

- Long title: An Act to improve, strengthen, and accelerate programs for the prevention and abatement of air pollution, as amended.
- Acronyms (colloquial): CAA
- Enacted by: the 88th United States Congress
- Effective: December 17, 1963

Codification
- U.S.C. sections created: 42 U.S.C. ch. 85 (§§ 7401-7671q)

Legislative history
- Passed the House on July 24, 1963 (273–102); Signed into law by President Lyndon B. Johnson on December 17, 1963

Major amendments
- Clean Air Act of 1963 (77 Stat. 392, Pub. L. 88–206); Motor Vehicle Air Pollution Control Act of 1965 (79 Stat. 992, Pub. L. 89–272); Air Quality Act of 1967 (81 Stat. 485, Pub. L. 90–148); Clean Air Amendments of 1970 (84 Stat. 1676, Pub. L. 91–604); Clean Air Act Amendments of 1977 (91 Stat. 685, Pub. L. 95–95); Clean Air Act Amendments of 1990 (104 Stat. 2468, Pub. L. 101–549); Inflation Reduction Act (136 Stat. 2063, Pub. L. 117–169 (text) (PDF))

United States Supreme Court cases
- List: Union Elec. Co. v. EPA, 427 U.S. 246 (1976); Chevron v. NRDC, 467 U.S. 837 (1984); Whitman v. Am. Trucking Ass'ns, 531 U.S. 457 (2001); Alaska Department of Environmental Conservation v. EPA, 540 U.S. 461 (2004); Engineer Manufacturers Association v. South Coast Air Quality Management District, 541 U.S. 246 (2004); Department of Transportation v. Public Citizen, 541 U.S. 752 (2004); Massachusetts v. EPA, 549 U.S. 497 (2007); Environmental Defense v. Duke Energy Corp., 549 U.S. 561 (2007); American Electric Power Co. v. Connecticut, 564 U.S. 410 (2011); EPA v. EME Homer City Generation, L. P., 572 U.S. 489 (2014); Utility Air Regulatory Group v. Environmental Protection Agency, 573 U.S. 302 (2014); Michigan v. EPA, No. 14-46, 576 U.S. ___ (2015); HollyFrontier Cheyenne Refining, LLC v. Renewable Fuels Assn., No. 20-472, 594 U.S. ___ (2021); West Virginia v. EPA, No. 20-1530, 597 U.S. ___ (2022); Ohio v. EPA, No. 23A349, 603 U.S. ___ (2024); Oklahoma v. EPA, No. 23-1067, 605 U.S. ___ (2025); EPA v. Calumet Shreveport Refining, No. 23-1229, 605 U.S. ___ (2025)

The Clean Air Act (CAA) is the United States' primary federal air quality law, intended to reduce and control air pollution nationwide. Initially enacted in 1963 and amended many times since, it is one of the United States' first and most influential modern environmental laws.

As with many other major U.S. federal environmental statutes, the Clean Air Act is administered by the U.S. Environmental Protection Agency (EPA), in coordination with state, local, and tribal governments. EPA develops extensive administrative regulations to carry out the law's mandates. Associated regulatory programs, which are often technical and complex, implement these regulations. Among the most important, the National Ambient Air Quality Standards program sets standards for concentrations of certain pollutants in outdoor air, and the National Emissions Standards for Hazardous Air Pollutants program which sets standards for emissions of particular hazardous pollutants from specific sources. Other programs create requirements for vehicle fuels, industrial facilities, and other technologies and activities that impact air quality. Newer programs tackle specific problems, including acid rain, ozone layer protection, and climate change.

The CAA has been challenged in court many times, both by environmental groups seeking more stringent enforcement and by states and utilities seeking greater leeway in regulation.

Although its exact benefits depend on what is counted, the Clean Air Act has substantially reduced air pollution and improved US air quality—benefits which EPA credits with saving trillions of dollars and many thousands of lives each year.

== Regulatory programs ==
In the United States, the "Clean Air Act" typically refers to the codified statute at 42 U.S.C. ch. 85. That statute is the product of multiple acts of Congress, one of which—the 1963 act—was actually titled the Clean Air Act, and another of which—the 1970 act—is most often referred to as such. In the U.S. Code, the statute itself is divided into subchapters, and the section numbers are not clearly related to the subchapters. However, in the bills that created the law, the major divisions are called "Titles", and the law's sections are numbered according to the title (e.g., Title II begins with Section 201). In practice, EPA, courts, and attorneys often use the latter numbering scheme.

Although many parts of the statute are quite detailed, others set out only the general outlines of the law's regulatory programs, and leave many key terms undefined. Responsible agencies, primarily EPA, have therefore developed administrative regulations to carry out Congress's instructions. EPA's proposed and final regulations are published in the Federal Register, often with lengthy background histories. The existing CAA regulations are codified at 40 C.F.R. Subchapter C, Parts 50–98. These Parts more often correspond to the Clean Air Act's major regulatory programs.

The following are major regulatory programs under the Clean Air Act.

=== National Ambient Air Quality Standards ===
The National Ambient Air Quality Standards (NAAQS) govern how much ground-level ozone (O_{3}), carbon monoxide (CO), particulate matter (PM_{10}, PM_{2.5}), lead (Pb), sulfur dioxide (SO_{2}), and nitrogen dioxide (NO_{2}) are allowed in the outdoor air. The NAAQS set the acceptable levels of certain air pollutants in the ambient air in the United States. Prior to 1965, there was no national program for developing ambient air quality standards, and prior to 1970 the federal government did not have primary responsibility for developing them.

The 1970 CAA amendments required EPA to determine which air pollutants posed the greatest threat to public health and welfare and promulgate NAAQS and air quality criteria for them. The health-based standards were called "primary" NAAQS, while standards set to protect public welfare other than health (e.g., agricultural values) were called "secondary" NAAQS.

In 1971, EPA promulgated regulations for sulfur oxides, particulate matter, carbon monoxide, photochemical oxidants, hydrocarbons, and nitrogen dioxide (36 FR 22384). Initially, EPA did not list lead as a criteria air pollutant, controlling it through mobile source authorities, but it was required to do so after successful litigation by Natural Resources Defense Council (NRDC) in 1976 (43 FR 46258).

The 1977 CAA Amendments created a process for regular review of the NAAQS list, and created a permanent independent scientific review committee to provide technical input on the NAAQS to EPA. EPA added regulations for PM2.5 in 1997 and updates the NAAQS from time to time based on emerging environmental and health science.

=== National Emissions Standards for Hazardous Air Pollutants ===
The National Emissions Standards for Hazardous Air Pollutants (NESHAPs) govern how much of 187 toxic air pollutants are allowed to be emitted from industrial facilities and other sources. These pollutants are often referred to as "air toxics" and include chemicals that are known or suspected to cause cancer, birth defects, and other serious health issues. Some of the notable hazardous air pollutants include:

- Benzene (found in gasoline)
- Asbestos
- Formaldehyde
- Lead compounds
- Mercury compounds
- Chloroform
- Arsenic compounds
- Cadmium compounds
- Dioxins and furans
- Polychlorinated biphenyls (PCBs).

Under the CAA, hazardous air pollutants (HAPs, or air toxics) are air pollutants other than those for which NAAQS exist, which threaten human health and welfare. The NESHAPs are the standards used for controlling, reducing, and eliminating HAPs emissions from stationary sources such as industrial facilities.

The 1970 CAA required EPA to develop a list of HAPs, and then develop national emissions standards for each of them. The original NESHAPs were health-based standards.

The 1990 CAA Amendments (Pub. L. 101–549 Title III) codified EPA's list, and required creation of technology-based standards according to "maximum achievable control technology" (MACT). Over the years, EPA has issued dozens of NESHAP regulations, which have developed NESHAPs by pollutant, by industry source category, and by industrial process. There are also NESHAPs for mobile sources (transportation), although these are primarily handled under the mobile source authorities. The 1990 amendments (adding CAA § 112(d-f)) also created a process by which EPA was required to review and update its NESHAPs every eight years, and identify any risks remaining after application of MACT, and develop additional rules necessary to protect public health.

=== New Source Performance Standards ===
The New Source Performance Standards (NSPS) are rules for the equipment required to be installed in new and modified industrial facilities, and the rules for determining whether a facility is "new".

The 1970 CAA required EPA to develop standards for newly constructed and modified stationary sources (industrial facilities) using the "best system of emission reduction which (taking into account the cost of achieving such reduction) the [EPA] determines has been adequately demonstrated." The EPA issued its first NSPS regulation the next year, covering steam generators, which emit carbon dioxide (CO_{2}), nitrogen oxides (NO_{x}), sulfur dioxide (SO_{2}), particulate matter (PM), carbon monoxide (CO), volatile organic compounds (VOCs), and mercury; incinerators, which release dioxins and furans, PM, heavy metals (e.g., lead, mercury, cadmium), CO, hydrochloric acid (HCl), SO_{2}, and NO_{x}; Portland cement plants, which emit PM, NO_{x}, SO_{2}, CO, VOCs, and heavy metals; nitric acid plants, which produce NO_{x}, nitrous oxide (N_{2}O), and ammonia (NH_{3}); and sulfuric acid plants, which discharge SO_{2}, sulfur trioxide (SO_{3}), and acid mist (PM). (36 FR 24876). Since then, EPA has issued dozens of NSPS regulations, primarily by source category. The requirements promote industrywide adoption of available pollution control technologies. However, because these standards apply only to new and modified sources, they promote extending the lifetimes of pre-existing facilities.

In the 1977 CAA Amendments, Congress required EPA to conduct a "new source review" process (40 CFR 52, subpart I) to determine whether maintenance and other activities rises to the level of modification requiring application of NSPS.

=== Acid Rain Program ===
The Acid Rain Program (ARP) is an emissions trading program for power plants to control the pollutants that cause acid rain. The 1990 CAA Amendments created a new title to address the issue of acid rain, and particularly nitrogen oxides (NO_{x}) and sulfur dioxide (SO_{2}) emissions from electric power plants powered by fossil fuels, and other industrial sources. The Acid Rain Program (ARP), established under the 1990 Clean Air Act Amendments, was the first cap-and-trade emissions program in the United States, aimed at reducing sulfur dioxide (SO_{2}) and nitrogen oxides (NO_{x}) emissions, the primary contributors to acid rain. The program set a national cap on total emissions of SO_{2} and NO_{x} from power plants, which was gradually reduced over time. Power plants were allocated emission allowances, each allowing the release of one ton of SO_{2}, based on historical emissions. Plants that reduced their emissions below their allowances could trade excess allowances with other plants, creating a financial incentive to invest in cleaner technologies. Continuous emissions monitoring systems were required to ensure compliance, and plants that exceeded their allowances faced fines. The program's success is evident in the 50% reduction of SO_{2} emissions from power plants by 2000, significantly improving air quality and reducing acid rain. The Acid Rain Program became a model for subsequent cap-and-trade systems, including those targeting greenhouse gas emissions.

=== Ozone layer protection ===
The CAA ozone program is a technology transition program intended to phase out the use of chemicals that harm the ozone layer. Consistent with the US commitments in the Montreal Protocol, CAA Title VI, added by the 1990 CAA Amendments, mandated regulations regarding the use and production of chemicals that harm Earth's stratospheric ozone layer. Ozone-depleting chemicals (ODCs) are substances that contribute to the depletion of Earth's stratospheric ozone layer, which protects life on Earth from harmful ultraviolet (UV) radiation. The primary ODCs regulated under the Clean Air Act (CAA) and the Montreal Protocol include chlorofluorocarbons (CFCs), halons, hydrochlorofluorocarbons (HCFCs), hydrofluorocarbons (HFCs), methyl chloroform, and carbon tetrachloride. CFCs were commonly used in refrigeration, air conditioning, and foam-blowing agents, while halons were used in fire extinguishing systems. HCFCs were seen as less harmful alternatives to CFCs but still contributed to ozone depletion, and they are also being phased out. Under Title VI, EPA runs programs to phase out ozone-destroying substances, track their import and export, determine exemptions for their continued use, and define practices for destroying them, maintaining and servicing equipment that uses them, identifying new alternatives to those still in use, and licensing technicians to use such chemicals.

=== Mobile source programs ===
Rules for pollutants emitted from internal combustion engines in vehicles. Since 1965, Congress has mandated increasingly stringent controls on vehicle engine technology and reductions in tailpipe emissions. Mobile source pollutants are emissions produced by internal combustion engines in motor vehicles, including cars, trucks, and buses. Key pollutants regulated under the Clean Air Act (CAA) include carbon monoxide (CO), a colorless, odorless gas that impairs oxygen transport in the blood; nitrogen oxides (NO_{x}), which contribute to the formation of ground-level ozone and acid rain, and can aggravate respiratory conditions; particulate matter (PM), tiny particles that can cause or worsen respiratory and cardiovascular diseases; volatile organic compounds (VOCs), which contribute to ozone formation and can lead to cancer and other health problems; hydrocarbons (HC), emitted from fuel combustion, which also contribute to ground-level ozone; and carbon dioxide (CO_{2}), a greenhouse gas that contributes to global climate change. EPA has set increasingly stringent controls on these emissions from motor vehicles, aiming to reduce their impact on public health and the environment by incorporating advanced engine technologies that balance emission reductions with factors such as cost, energy use, and safety. Today, the law requires EPA to establish and regularly update regulations for pollutants that may threaten public health, from a wide variety of classes of motor vehicles, that incorporate technology to achieve the "greatest degree of emission reduction achievable", factoring in availability, cost, energy, and safety (42 U.S.C. § 7521). Since the introduction of vehicle emissions regulations in 1965 and the subsequent amendments to the Clean Air Act (CAA), significant reductions in mobile source pollutants have been achieved. Carbon monoxide (CO) emissions have decreased by more than 80% since 1970, primarily due to improvements in engine design and the introduction of catalytic converters. Nitrogen oxides (NO_{x}) emissions have been reduced by over 50% since 1970, driven by advancements in engine technology and stricter emission standards. Particulate matter (PM) emissions have dropped by more than 90%, thanks to cleaner-burning engines and the use of diesel particulate filters. Volatile organic compounds (VOCs) have been reduced by around 85% since 1970, due to better fuel management and evaporative emission controls. Hydrocarbon (HC) emissions have decreased by approximately 80%, facilitated by improvements in fuel combustion technology and engine control strategies. While carbon dioxide (CO_{2}) emissions per mile have been reduced by 30-40% since the 1970s due to increased fuel efficiency, total CO_{2} emissions remain a concern due to increased vehicle miles traveled and the growth of larger vehicles. These reductions are the result of technological advancements, such as catalytic converters, on-board diagnostics, and more efficient engines, along with stricter fuel standards and the use of alternative fuels. The EPA continues to update and enforce emission standards to further reduce the impact of vehicle emissions on air quality and public health.

==== On-road vehicles regulations ====
EPA sets standards for exhaust gases, evaporative emissions, air toxics, refueling vapor recovery, and vehicle inspection and maintenance for several classes of vehicles that travel on roadways. EPA's "light-duty vehicles" regulations cover passenger cars, minivans, passenger vans, pickup trucks, and SUVs. "Heavy-duty vehicles" regulations cover large trucks and buses. EPA first issued motorcycle emissions regulations in 1977 (42 FR 1122) and updated them in 2004 (69 FR 2397).

Vehicle testing program

The air pollution testing system for motor vehicles was originally developed in 1972 and used driving cycles designed to simulate driving during rush-hour in Los Angeles during that era. Until 1984, EPA reported the exact fuel economy figures calculated from the test. In 1984, EPA began adjusting city (aka Urban Dynamometer Driving Schedule or UDDS) results downward by 10% and highway (aka HighWay Fuel Economy Test or HWFET) results by 22% to compensate for changes in driving conditions since 1972, and to better correlate the EPA test results with real-world driving. In 1996, EPA proposed updating the Federal Testing Procedures to add a new higher-speed test (US06) and an air-conditioner-on test (SC03) to further improve the correlation of fuel economy and emission estimates with real-world reports. In December 2006 the updated testing methodology was finalized to be implemented in model year 2008 vehicles and set the precedent of a 12-year review cycle for the test procedures.

In February 2005, EPA launched a program called "Your MPG" that allows drivers to add real-world fuel economy statistics into a database on EPA's fuel economy website and compare them with others and with the original EPA test results.

EPA conducts fuel economy tests on very few vehicles. Two-thirds of the vehicles the EPA tests themselves are randomly selected and the remaining third is tested for specific reasons.

Although originally created as a reference point for fossil-fueled vehicles, driving cycles have been used for estimating how many miles an electric vehicle will get on a single charge.

==== Non-road vehicles regulations ====
The 1970 CAA amendments provided for regulation of aircraft emissions (42 U.S.C. § 7571), and EPA began regulating in 1973. In 2012, EPA finalized its newest restrictions on NOx emissions from gas turbine aircraft engines with rated thrusts above 26.7 kiloNewton (3 short ton-force), meaning primarily commercial jet aircraft engines, intended to match international standards. EPA has been investigating whether to regulate lead in fuels for small aircraft since 2010, but has not yet acted. The 1990 CAA Amendments (Pub. L. 101–549 § 222) added rules for a "nonroad" engine program (42 U.S.C. § 7547), which expanded EPA regulation to locomotives, heavy equipment and small equipment engines fueled by diesel (compression-ignition), and gas and other fuels (spark-ignition), and marine transport.

==== Voluntary programs ====
EPA has developed a variety of voluntary programs to incentivize and promote reduction in transportation-related air pollution, including elements of the Clean Diesel Campaign, Ports Initiative, "SmartWay" program (for the freight transportation sector), and others.

=== Fuel controls ===
The federal government has regulated the chemical composition of transportation fuels since 1967, with significant new authority added in 1970 to protect public health. One of EPA's earliest actions was the elimination of lead in U.S. gasoline beginning in 1971, a project that has been described as "one of the great public health achievements of the 20th century." EPA continues to regulate the chemical composition of gasoline, avgas, and diesel fuel in the United States.

=== Stationary source operating permits ===
The 1990 amendments authorized a national operating permit program, sometimes called the "Title V Program", covering thousands of large industrial and commercial sources. It required large businesses to address pollutants released into the air, measure their quantity, and have a plan to control and minimize them as well as to periodically report. This consolidated requirements for a facility into a single document. In non-attainment areas, permits were required for sources that emit as little as 50, 25, or 10 tons per year of VOCs depending on the severity of the region's non-attainment status. Most permits are issued by state and local agencies. If the state does not adequately monitor requirements, the EPA may take control. The public may request to view the permits by contacting the EPA. The permit is limited to no more than five years and requires a renewal.

=== Monitoring and enforcement ===
Pursuant to one of the most public aspects of the Clean Air Act, EPA is empowered to monitor compliance with the law's many requirements, seek penalties for violations, and compel regulated entities to come into compliance. Enforcement cases are usually settled, with penalties assessed well below maximum statutory limits. Many of the largest Clean Air Act settlements have been reached with automakers accused of circumventing the Act's vehicle and fuel standards (e.g., the 2015 "Dieselgate" scandal).

=== Greenhouse gas regulation ===
Much of EPA's regulation of greenhouse gas (GHG) emissions occurs under the programs discussed above. EPA began regulating GHG emissions following the 2007 Supreme Court ruling in Massachusetts v. EPA, the EPA's subsequent endangerment finding, and development of specific regulations for various sources. The EPA's authority to regulate carbon dioxide emissions was questioned by the court in West Virginia v. EPA (2022) but restored by Congress with the Inflation Reduction Act of 2022, which clarified that carbon dioxide is one of the pollutants covered by the Clean Air Act.

Standards for mobile sources have been established pursuant to Section 202 of the CAA, and GHGs from stationary sources are controlled under the authority of Part C of Title I of the Act. The EPA's auto emission standards for greenhouse gas emissions issued in 2010 and 2012 are intended to cut emissions from targeted vehicles by half, double fuel economy of passenger cars and light-duty trucks by 2025 and save over $4 billion barrels of oil and $1.7 trillion for consumers. The agency has also proposed a two-phase program to reduce greenhouse gas emissions for medium and heavy duty trucks and buses. In addition, EPA oversees the national greenhouse gas inventory reporting program.

Following the Supreme Court decision in West Virginia v. EPA, which ruled that Congress did not grant EPA the authority to require "outside the fence" options for limiting carbon dioxide at power plants, the Inflation Reduction Act of 2022 specifically defined carbon dioxide, hydrofluorocarbons, methane, nitrous oxide, perfluorocarbons, and sulfur hexafluoride as greenhouse gases to be regulated by the EPA, as well as giving the EPA the ability to regulate the inclusion of renewable sources, notably, through a $27 billion green bank, among other methods.

=== Others ===
Other important but less foundational Clean Air Act regulatory programs tend to build on or cut across the above programs:

- Risk Assessment. Although not a regulatory program per se, many EPA regulatory programs involve risk assessment and management. Over the years, EPA has undertaken to unify and organize its many risk assessment processes. The 1990 CAA Amendments created a Commission on Risk Assessment and Management tasked with making recommendations for a risk assessment framework, and many subsequent reports have built on this work.
- Visibility and Regional Haze. EPA monitors visibility and air clarity (haze) at 156 protected parks and wilderness areas, and requires states to develop plans to improve visibility by reducing pollutants that contribute to haze.
- Interstate pollution control. The Clean Air Act's "good neighbor" provision requires states to control emissions that will significantly contribute to NAAQS nonattainment or maintenance in a downwind state. EPA has struggled to enact regulations that implement this requirement for many years. It developed the "Clean Air Interstate Rule" between 2003 and 2005, but this was overturned by the courts in 2008. EPA then developed the Cross-State Air Pollution Rule between 2009 and 2011, and it continues to be litigated as EPA updates it.
- Startup, Shutdown, & Malfunction. EPA promulgates rules for states to address excess emissions during periods of startup, shutdown, and malfunction, when facility emissions may temporarily be much higher than standard regulatory limits.

== Clean Air Act and states ==
=== State implementation plans ===
The 1963 act required development of State Implementation Plans (SIPs) as part of a cooperative federalist program for developing pollution control standards and programs. Rather than create a solely national program, the CAA imposes responsibilities on the U.S. states to create plans to implement the Act's requirements. EPA then reviews, amends, and approves those plans. EPA first promulgated SIP regulations in 1971 and 1972.

The 1970 Amendments imposed eight criteria that an implementation plan must meet. The EPA is required to approve plans that adhere to the Senate's three-year mandate for primary air quality standards even if the Agency feels the plan does not appear feasible. In Union Electric Co. v. Environmental Protection Agency the Supreme Court considered whether the Agency was required to reject plans that were not technologically or economically feasible. The court decided that states could adopt emission standards stricter than national standards and "force" technology (i.e. require installation of more advanced technologies).

==== Non-attainment areas ====
The 1977 CAA Amendments added SIP requirements for areas that had not attained the applicable NAAQS ("nonattainment areas"). In these areas, states were required to adopt plans that made "reasonable further progress" toward attainment until all "reasonably available control measures" could be adopted. As progress on attainment was much slower than Congress originally instructed, major amendments to SIP requirements in nonattainment areas were part of the 1990 CAA Amendments.

==== Prevention of significant deterioration ====
The 1977 CAA Amendments modified the SIP requirements by adding "Prevention of Significant Deterioration" (PSD) requirements. These requirements protect areas, including particularly wilderness areas and national parks, that already met the NAAQS. The PSD provision requires SIPs to preserve good quality air in addition to cleaning up bad air. The new law also required New Source Review (investigations of proposed construction of new polluting facilities) to examine whether PSD requirements would be met.

=== Federalism ===
The Clean Air Act provided the EPA with enforcement authority and requiring states to develop State Implementation Plans for how they would meet new national ambient air quality standards by 1977. This cooperative federal model continues today. The law recognizes that states should lead in carrying out the Clean Air Act, because pollution control problems often require special understanding of local conditions such as geography, industrial activity, transportation and housing patterns. However, states are not allowed to have weaker controls than the national minimum criteria set by EPA. EPA must approve each SIP, and if a SIP is not acceptable, EPA can retain CAA enforcement in that state. For example, California was unable to meet the new standards set by the 1970 amendments, which led to a lawsuit and a federal state implementation plan for the state. The federal government also assists the states by providing scientific research, expert studies, engineering designs, and money to support clean air programs.

The law also prevents states from setting standards that are more strict than the federal standards, but carves out a special exemption for California due to its past issues with smog pollution in the metropolitan areas. In practice, when California's environmental agencies decide on new vehicle emission standards, they are submitted to the EPA for approval under this waiver, with the most recent approval in 2009. The California standard was adopted by twelve other states, and established the de facto standard that automobile manufacturers subsequently accepted, to avoid having to develop different emission systems in their vehicles for different states. However, in September 2019, President Donald Trump attempted to revoke this waiver, arguing that the stricter emissions have made cars too expensive, and by removing them, will make vehicles safer. EPA's Andrew Wheeler also stated that while the agency respects federalism, it could not allow one state to dictate standards for the entire nation. California's governor Gavin Newsom considered the move part of Trump's "political vendetta" against California and stated his intent to sue the federal government. Twenty-three states, along with the District of Columbia and the cities of New York City and Los Angeles, joined California in a federal lawsuit challenging the administration's decision. In March 2022 the Biden administration reversed the Trump-era rule, allowing California to again set stricter auto emissions standards.

== History ==
Between the Second Industrial Revolution and the 1960s, the United States experienced increasingly severe air pollution. Following the 1948 Donora smog event, the public began to discuss air pollution as a major problem, states began to pass a series of laws to reduce air pollution, and Congress began discussing whether to take further action in response. At the time, the primary federal agencies interested in air pollution were the United States Bureau of Mines, which was interested in "smoke abatement" (reducing smoke from coal burning), and the United States Public Health Service, which handled industrial hygiene and was concerned with the causes of lung health problems.

After several years of proposals and hearings, Congress passed the first federal legislation to address air pollution in 1955. The Air Pollution Control Act of 1955 authorized a research and training program, sending $3 million per year to the U.S. Public Health Service for five years, but did not directly regulate pollution sources. The 1955 Act's research program was extended in 1959, 1960, and 1962 while Congress considered whether to regulate further.

Beginning in 1963, Congress began expanding federal air pollution control law to accelerate the elimination of air pollution throughout the country. The new law's programs were initially administered by the U.S. Secretary of Health, Education, and Welfare, and the Air Pollution Office of the U.S. Public Health Service, until they were transferred to the newly created EPA immediately before major amendments in 1970. EPA has administered the Clean Air Act ever since, and Congress added major regulatory programs in 1977 and 1990. Most recently, the U.S. Supreme Court's ruling in Massachusetts v. EPA resulted in an expansion of EPA's CAA regulatory activities to cover greenhouse gases.

=== Clean Air Act of 1963 and early amendments ===
The Clean Air Act of 1963 (Pub. L. 88–206) was the first federal legislation to permit the U.S. federal government to take direct action to control air pollution. It extended the 1955 research program, encouraged cooperative state, local, and federal action to reduce air pollution, appropriated $95 million over three years to support the development of state pollution control programs, and authorized the HEW Secretary to organize conferences and take direct action against interstate air pollution where state action was deemed to be insufficient.

The Motor Vehicle Air Pollution Control Act (Pub. L. 89–272) amended the 1963 Clean Air Act and set the first federal vehicle emissions standards, beginning with the 1968 models. These standards were reductions from 1963 emissions levels: 72% reduction for hydrocarbons, 56% reduction for carbon monoxide, and 100% reduction for crankcase hydrocarbons.. The law also added a new section to authorize abatement of international air pollution.

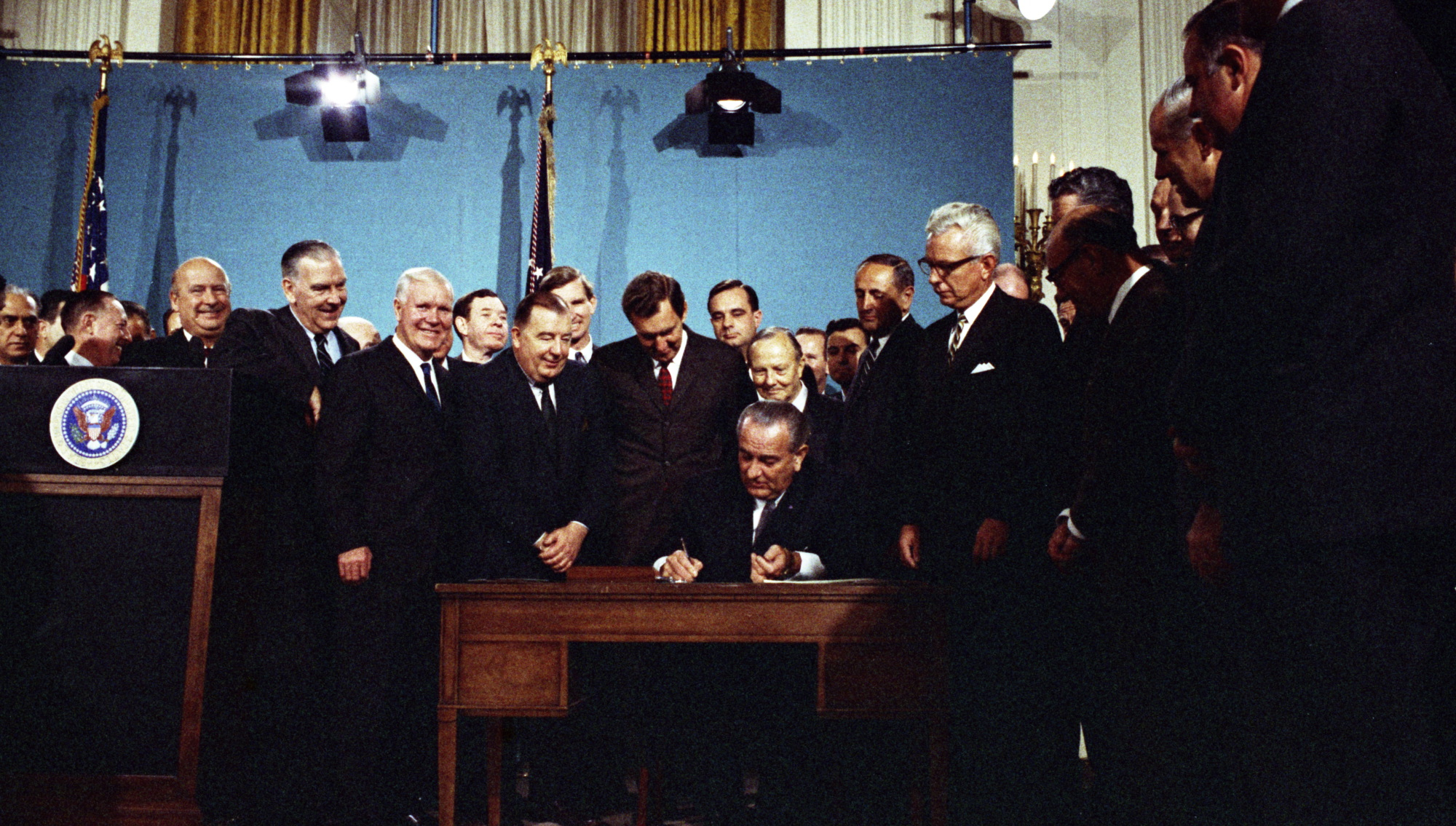
President Lyndon B. Johnson signs the 1967 Air Quality Act in the East Room of the White House, November 21, 1967.

The Air Quality Act of 1967 (Pub. L. 90–148) authorized planning grants to state air pollution control agencies, permitted the creation of interstate air pollution control agencies, and required HEW to define air quality regions and develop technical documentation that would allow states to set ambient air quality and pollution control technology standards, and required states to submit implementation plans for improvement of air quality, and permitted HEW to take direct abatement action in air pollution emergencies. It also authorized expanded studies of air pollutant emission inventories, ambient monitoring techniques, and control techniques. This enabled the federal government to increase its activities to investigate enforcing interstate air pollution transport, and, for the first time, to perform far-reaching ambient monitoring studies and stationary source inspections. The 1967 act also authorized expanded studies of air pollutant emission inventories, ambient monitoring techniques, and control techniques. While only six states had air pollution programs in 1960, all 50 states had air pollution programs by 1970 due to the federal funding and legislation of the 1960s.

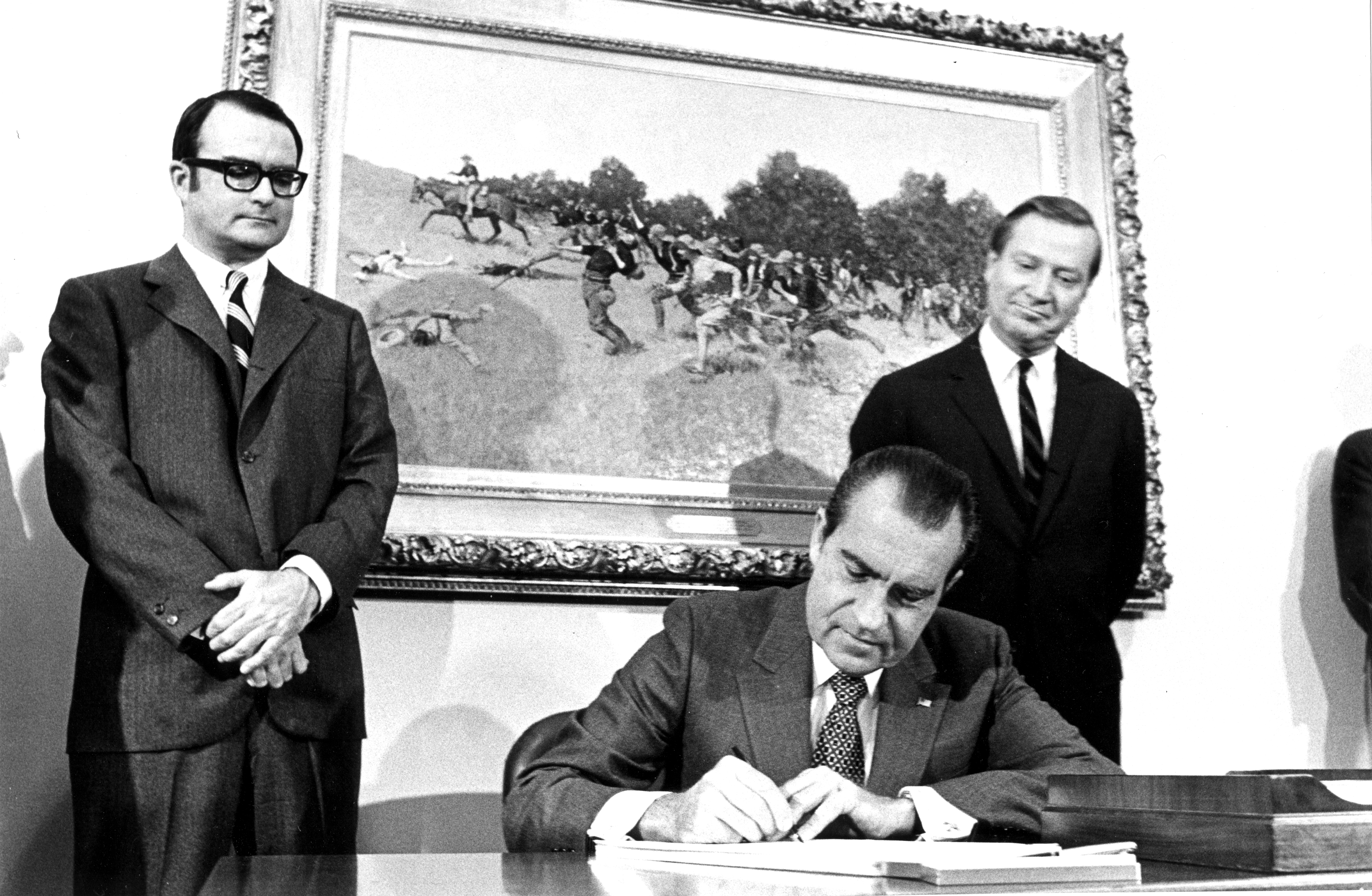
President Richard Nixon signs the Clean Air Amendments of 1970 at the White House, December 31, 1970.

=== 1970 and 1977 amendments ===
In the Clean Air Amendments of 1970 congress greatly expanded the federal mandate by requiring comprehensive federal and state regulations for both industrial and mobile sources. The law established the National Ambient Air Quality Standards (NAAQS), New Source Performance Standards (NSPS); and National Emissions Standards for Hazardous Air Pollutants (NESHAPs), and significantly strengthened federal enforcement authority, all toward achieving aggressive air pollution reduction goals.

To implement the strict amendments, EPA Administrator William Ruckelshaus spent 60% of his time during his first term on the automobile industry, whose emissions were to be reduced 90% under the new law. Senators had been frustrated at the industry's failure to cut emissions under previous, weaker air laws.

Major amendments were added to the Clean Air Act in 1977 (1977 CAAA). The 1977 Amendments primarily concerned provisions for the Prevention of Significant Deterioration (PSD) of air quality in areas attaining the NAAQS. The 1977 CAAA also contained requirements pertaining to sources in non-attainment areas for NAAQS. A non-attainment area is a geographic area that does not meet one or more of the federal air quality standards. Both of these 1977 CAAA established major permit review requirements to ensure attainment and maintenance of the NAAQS. These amendments also included the adoption of an offset trading policy originally applied to Los Angeles in 1974 that enables new sources to offset their emissions by purchasing extra reductions from existing sources.

=== 1990 amendments ===
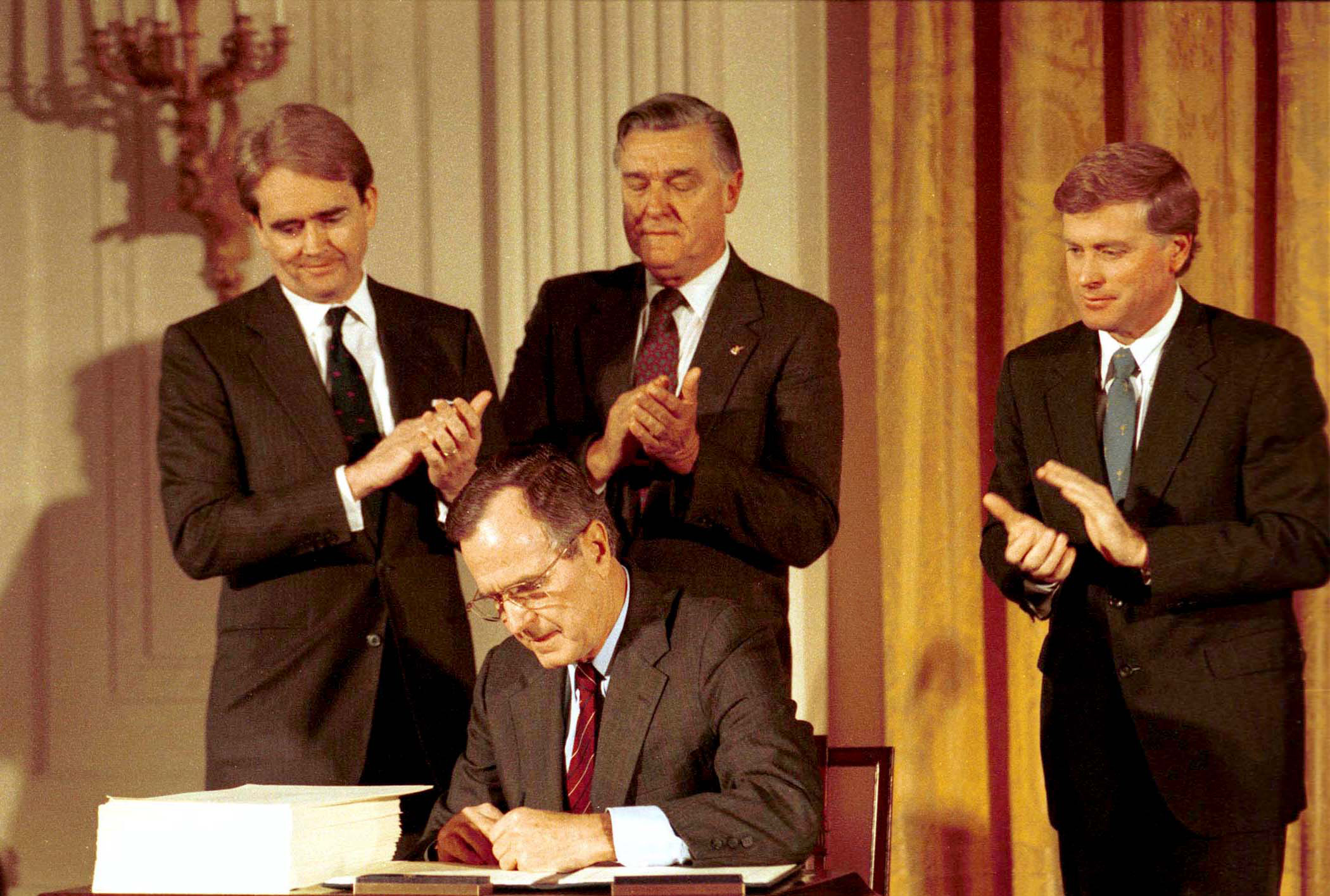
President George H. W. Bush signs the Clean Air Act Amendments of 1990 at the White House, November 15, 1990.

Another set of major amendments to the Clean Air Act occurred in 1990 (1990 CAAA) (104 Stat. 2468, Pub. L. 101–549). The 1990 CAAA substantially increased the authority and responsibility of the federal government. New regulatory programs were authorized for control of acid deposition (acid rain) and for the issuance of stationary source operating permits. The NESHAPs were incorporated into a greatly expanded program for controlling toxic air pollutants. The provisions for attainment and maintenance of NAAQS were substantially modified and expanded. Other revisions included provisions regarding stratospheric ozone protection, increased enforcement authority, and expanded research programs.

The 1990 Clean Air Act added regulatory programs for control of acid deposition (acid rain) and stationary source operating permits. The provisions aimed at reducing sulfur dioxide emissions included a cap-and-trade program, which gave power companies more flexibility in meeting the law's goals compared to earlier iterations of the Clean Air Act. The amendments moved considerably beyond the original criteria pollutants, expanding the NESHAP program with a list of 189 hazardous air pollutants to be controlled within hundreds of source categories, according to a specific schedule. The NAAQS program was also expanded. Other new provisions covered stratospheric ozone protection, increased enforcement authority and expanded research programs.

Further amendments were made in 1990 to address the problems of acid rain, ozone depletion, and toxic air pollution, and to establish a national permit program for stationary sources, and increased enforcement authority. The amendments also established new auto gasoline reformulation requirements, set Reid vapor pressure (RVP) standards to control evaporative emissions from gasoline, and mandated new gasoline formulations sold from May to September in many states. Reviewing his tenure as EPA Administrator under President George H. W. Bush, William K. Reilly characterized passage of the 1990 amendments to the Clean Air Act as his most notable accomplishment.

The 1990 amendments also included a requirement for the Department of Labor to issue, no later than 12 months from the date of publication of the amendments, and in collaboration with the EPA, a "process safety standard". The text also highlighted the 14 principles on which this should be based. These were implemented in 1992 in OSHA's Process Safety Management regulation (Title 29 CFR Part 1910, Subpart H § 1910.119), as well as in EPA's 1996 Risk Management Program (RMP) rule (Title 40 CFR Part 68).

=== 2022 amendments ===
The Inflation Reduction Act, the budget reconciliation bill signed by President Joe Biden in August 2022, amends the Clean Air Act to allow the EPA to administer $27 billion in grants to green banks nationwide, through a competitive funding mechanism to be called the Greenhouse Gas Reduction Fund.

On April 4, 2024, the Biden administration announced the eight recipients of the first $20 billion of the Greenhouse Gas Reduction Fund. For the $14 billion National Clean Investment Fund, the recipients are the consumer-focused Climate United Fund ($6.97 billion to a consortium of Calvert Impact, Self-Help Ventures Fund and Community Preservation Corporation), the Coalition for Green Capital ($5 billion), and Power Forward Communities ($2 billion to a consortium of Enterprise Community Partners, Local Initiatives Support Corporation, United Way, Habitat for Humanity and Rewiring America); collectively they have pledged 60 percent of funds would go to low-income and marginalized communities, well above the 40 percent required by Biden. For the $6 billion Clean Communities Investment Accelerator program to disburse money exclusively and deep into such communities, they are four CDFI Intermediaries (Opportunity Finance Network, Inclusiv, Native CDFI Network, and Appalachian Community Capital) receiving a total of roughly $5.1 billion, and a coalition of community organizations called the Justice Climate Fund receiving $940 million. The Biden administration projects that they will leverage $7 from the private sector for every dollar of public investment, and slash emissions by up to 40 million metric tons by 2032 through a wide variety of projects.

The remaining $7 billion will go to 60 distributed generation projects in low-income communities, and is forecast to collectively save 900,000 households $8 billion in energy bills by the IRA's expiration.

The Act is expected to generate high rates of return for the government on private sector investments from the Fund. The Act also designates carbon dioxide and other greenhouse gases as substances to be regulated by the EPA, in reaction to the Supreme Court case West Virginia v. EPA, which limited the EPA's authority to institute a program such as the Obama-era Clean Power Plan. The IRA also allows the EPA more leeway to promote renewable energy.

== Effects ==
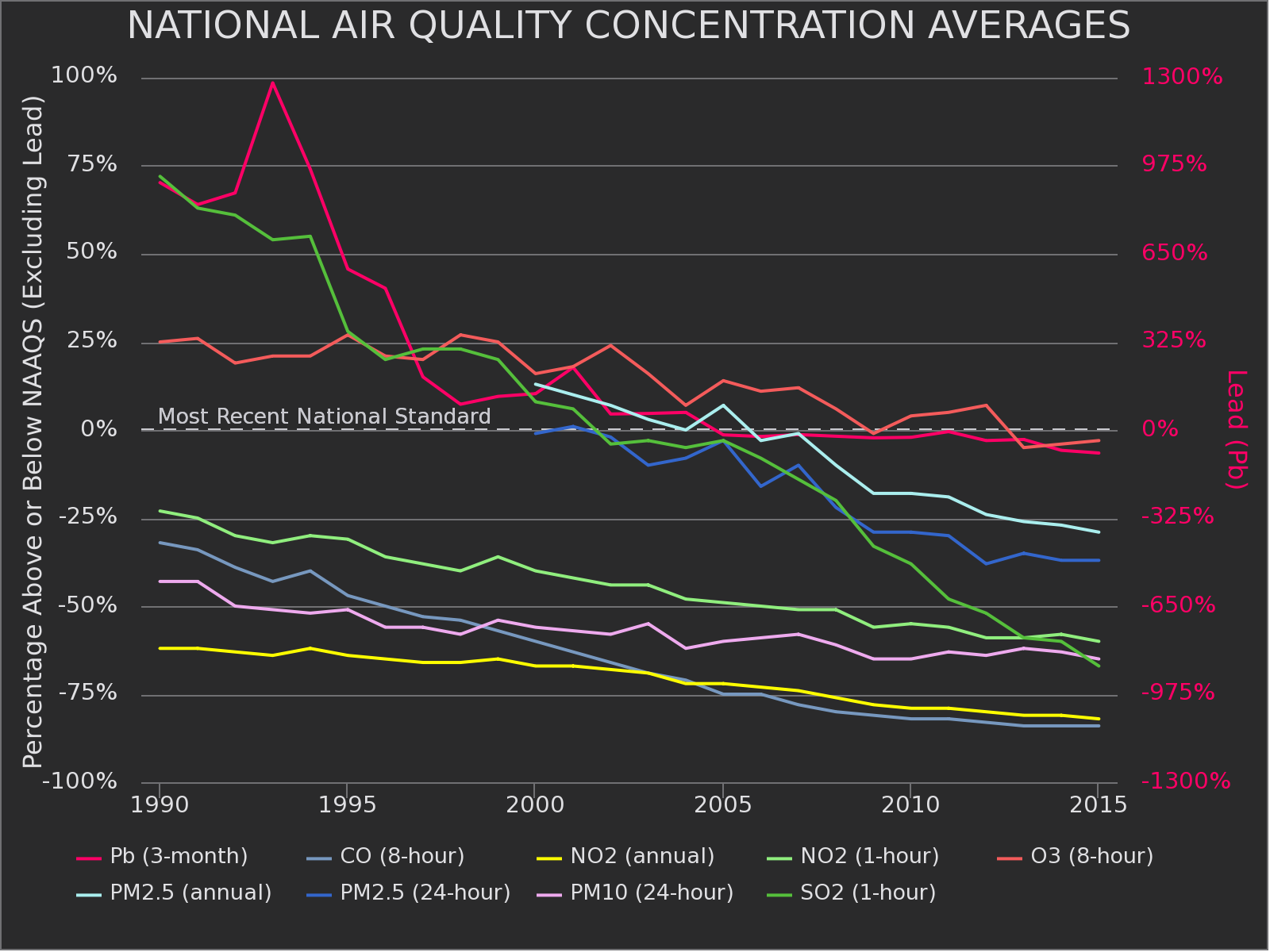
Graph showing decreases in US air pollution concentrations during 1990 to 2015

According to a 2022 review study in the Journal of Economic Literature, there is overwhelming causal evidence that shows that the CAA improved air quality.

According to a 2011 study by EPA, when compared to the baseline of the 1970 and 1977 regulatory programs, by 2020 the updates initiated by the 1990 Clean Air Act Amendments would be costing the United States about $60 billion per year, while benefiting the United States (in monetized health and lives saved) about $2 trillion per year. In 2020, a study prepared for the Natural Resources Defense Council estimated annual benefits at 370,000 avoided premature deaths, 189,000 fewer hospital admissions, and net economic benefits of up to $3.8 trillion (32 times the cost of the regulations). Other studies have reached similar conclusions.

Mobile sources including automobiles, trains, and boat engines have become 99% cleaner for pollutants like hydrocarbons, carbon monoxide, nitrogen oxides, and particle emissions since the 1970s. The allowable emissions of volatile organic chemicals, carbon monoxide, nitrogen oxides, and lead from individual cars have also been reduced by more than 90%, resulting in decreased national emissions of these pollutants despite a more than 400% increase in total miles driven yearly. Since the 1980s, 1/4th of ground level ozone has been cut, mercury emissions have been cut by 80%, and since the change from leaded gas to unleaded gas 90% of atmospheric lead pollution has been reduced. A 2018 study found that the Clean Air Act contributed to the 60% decline in pollution emissions by the manufacturing industry between 1990 and 2008.

== Legal challenges ==
Since its inception, the authority given to the EPA by Congress and the EPA's rulemaking within the Clean Air Act has been subject to numerous lawsuits. Some of the major suits where the Clean Air Act has been focal point of litigation include the following:

Train v. Natural Resources Defense Council, Inc., 421 U.S. 60 (1975)
Under the Clean Air Act, states were required to submit their implementation plans within nine months of the EPA's promulgation of the new standards. The EPA approved several state plans that allowed for variances in their emissions limitations, and the Natural Resources Defense Council challenged that approval. The Supreme Court held that the EPA's approval was valid, and that as long as the "ultimate effect of a State's choice of emission limitations is compliance with the national standards for ambient air," a state is "at liberty to adopt whatever mix of emission limitations it deems best suited to its particular situation".

Chevron U.S.A., Inc. v. Natural Resources Defense Council, Inc., 467 U.S. 837 (1984)
The Clean Air Act instructed the EPA to regulate emissions from sources of air pollution, but did not define what should be considered a source for the emission of air pollution, so the EPA had interpreted what a source was based on the legislation. The EPA's interpretation was challenged, but after review, the Supreme Court ruled in a 7–0 decision that the EPA had judicial deference to establish their own interpretation of law when the law is ambiguous and the interpretation is reasonable and consistent. This principle has come to be known as the Chevron deference applying to any executive agency granted powers from Congress.

Whitman v. American Trucking Ass'ns, Inc., 531 U.S. 457 (2001)
Following the EPA's rulemaking related to setting NAAQS standards related to diesel truck emissions, the trucking industry challenged the EPA's rule in lower courts, asserting the EPA's rule failed to justify reasoning for these new levels and violated the nondelegation doctrine. The D.C. Circuit Court found in favor of the trucking industry, determining that the EPA's rule did not consider the costs of implementing emissions regulations and controls. The Supreme Court reversed the D.C. District Court's ruling, affirming that not only was the delegation of power from Congress to the EPA by the Clean Air Act constitutional, but that the law did not require the EPA to consider costs as part of its determination for air quality controls.

Massachusetts v. Environmental Protection Agency, 549 U.S. 497 (2007)
With pressure from states and environmental groups on the EPA to regulate carbon dioxide and other greenhouse gas emissions from motor vehicles, the EPA determined in 2003 that the language of the Clean Air Act did not allow them to regulate emissions from motor vehicles, nor were they motivated to set such regulations even if they were able to. Multiple states and agencies sued the EPA for failing to act on what they considered to be harmful air pollutants. The Supreme Court ruled 5–4 that not only did the Clean Air Act mandate the EPA to regulate carbon dioxide and other greenhouse gases as air pollutants, but that failing to regulate these emissions would leave the EPA liable to further litigation. While the decision has remained contentious, the Court's decision in Massachusetts v. EPA was considered landmark, as it opened up the courts for further environmental lawsuits to force entities to respond to climate change.

American Electric Power Co. v. Connecticut, 564 U.S. 410 (2011)
Several states and cities sued electric utility companies to force them to use a cap-and-trade system to reduce their emissions under a claim their emissions were a public nuisance. The Supreme Court ruled in an 8–0 decision that private companies cannot be sued by other parties for emissions-related issues, as this is a power specifically delegated to the EPA through the Clean Air Act under federal common law.

Utility Air Regulatory Group v. Environmental Protection Agency, 573 U.S. 302 (2014)
The EPA issued new rules in 2010 that expanded emissions regulations for both regulated air pollutants and greenhouse gases to light and heavy engines and smaller stationary sources. These expanded rules were challenged by several power companies and regulatory groups, as they greatly expanded what types of facilities would need to acquire environmental permits prior to construction. The Supreme Court generally upheld the EPA's powers through the Clean Air Act, through it vacated portions of the EPA's new rules affecting smaller sources.

Michigan v. EPA, 576 U.S. 743 (2015)
In 2012, the EPA issued new rules that identified new pollutants such as mercury as hazardous materials to be regulated in power plant emissions. The cost of implementing mercury pollution controls on new and existing plants can be expensive, and several states, companies, and other organizations sued the EPA that their analysis leading to these new rules did not consider the cost factor involved. The Supreme Court ruled 5–4 that the EPA's failure to consider the costs of these pollution controls was inappropriate, and that cost must be a factor in any finding that the EPA finds "necessary and appropriate" under the Clean Air Act.

West Virginia v. EPA, 597 U.S. ___ (2022)
In 2014, the EPA under the Obama administration proposed the Clean Power Plan (CPP), which aimed to combat climate change by reducing carbon dioxide emissions from coal-burning power plants. Using its authority under 42 U.S.C. § 7411(d), the agency sought to regulate emissions from existing power plants. After the final plan was announced in 2015, a number of states successfully petitioned federal courts for an emergency stay to block the implementation of the plan. In 2017, the CPP never having been implemented, the EPA under the Trump administration enacted the Affordable Clean Energy (ACE) rule, which repealed the CPP. A different set of states and environmental advocacy groups challenged the ACE rule in federal court, and on January 19, 2021, the D.C. Circuit Court of Appeals vacated the rule because it relied on a flawed interpretation of § 7411(d). A number of states petitioned the Supreme Court, arguing that the D.C. Circuit's interpretation of § 7411(d) was too broad, and four petitions were consolidated as West Virginia v. EPA. On June 30, 2022, the Supreme Court ruled in a 6–3 decision that the CPP was invalid because it fell under the major questions doctrine and thus required more specific Congressional approval than could reasonably be argued to be present in the statute.

== Current challenges ==
As poor air quality is still an issue in the United States, it has been noted that it is 1.5 times more likely for an ethnic minority person to live in an area burdened with air pollution than it is for an ethnic majority person. While the United States is still being affected by the COVID-19 pandemic, research has shown that if someone lives in an area that experiences air pollution, they are 8% more likely to experience long-term COVID effects, potentially with a fatal outcome. This creates a disparity between minority and majority communities of Americans, even though the air pollution that these communities face is often a result of redlining, which places minority communities in areas where industries that heavily pollute the air, as well as high-traffic roadways, reside.

Solutions proposed by the Sierra Club and the Environmental Protection Agency (EPA) include funding clean energy transportation services, lowering acceptable emission levels, and enforcing the Clean Air Act that is already in place more intensely. While the Clean Air Act has been generally effective since it was enacted in 1970, there have been efforts from the fossil fuel industry to override it which have led to worse air pollution in many communities.

An example of an area where the Clean Air Act has not been too effective is the San Joaquin Valley which experiences poor air quality conditions that stem from harmful agricultural practices, heavy traffic on major roadways, and the oil industry. Research shows that the leading air pollutant in the region is known as PM 2.5, or fine particulate matter, and causes health issues in pregnant women exposed to it, such as more severe asthma, decreased FEV1, compromised immunity, and an increased risk of premature birth. Other symptoms that come from exposure to PM 2.5 include chronic bronchitis, reduced lung function in children, and heart and lung-related hospitalizations that can potentially lead to premature death especially if the individual has previous health concerns. In 2004, a mass decrease in PM 2.5 pollution occurred because of a decline in agricultural and biomass burning practices; however, it is still a common occurrence today and PM 2.5 levels have increased. Organizations such as the California Air Resources Board (CARB) have recommended that more sufficient regulations be implemented in the San Joaquin Valley to reduce toxic emissions into the atmosphere. There are now efforts from the EPA, the CARB, and the San Joaquin Valley Air Pollution Control District to enforce regulations from the Clean Air Act and fund further efforts to live in a more sustainable fashion.

== Future challenges ==
As of 2017, some US cities still do not meet all national ambient air quality standards. It is likely that tens of thousands of premature deaths are still being caused by fine-particle pollution and ground-level ozone pollution.

Climate change poses a challenge to the management of conventional air pollutants in the United States due to warmer, dryer summer conditions that can lead to increased air stagnation episodes. Prolonged droughts that may contribute to wildfires would also result in regionally high levels of air particles.

Transboundary air pollution (both entering and exiting the United States) is not directly regulated by the Clean Air Act, requiring international negotiations and ongoing agreements with other nations, particularly Canada and Mexico.

Environmental justice continues to be an ongoing challenge for the Clean Air Act. By promoting pollution reduction, the Clean Air Act helps reduce heightened exposure to air pollution among minority and low-income communities. But African American populations are "consistently over represented" in areas with the poorest air quality. Dense populations of low-income and minority communities inhabit the most polluted areas across the United States, which is considered to exacerbate health problems among these populations. High levels of exposure to air pollution is linked to several health conditions, including asthma, cancer, premature death, and infant mortality, each of which disproportionately impact minority and low-income communities. The pollution reduction achieved by the Clean Air Act is associated with a decline in each of these conditions and can promote environmental justice for communities that are disproportionately impacted by air pollution and diminished health status.

== See also ==
- 1970 in the environment
- Diesel Emissions Reduction Act (2005; amended 2010)
- Smoke abatement
- United States energy law
