= SC03 =

American passenger car fuel economy test series

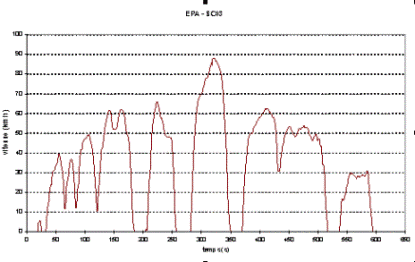
EPA SC03 supplemental driving cycle

The SC03 is a driving cycle used to measure vehicle emissions associated with air conditioning usage. It is used by the US Environmental Protection Agency (EPA) to measure tailpipe emissions and fuel economy of passenger cars on a vehicle dynamometer.

The SC03 is part of the "Supplemental Federal Test Procedure" (SFTP), which was developed to test driving conditions beyond those encountered in the standard highway (HWFET) and city (FTP-75) driving cycles. In 2008, the EPA added the US06 and SC03 supplemental tests, as well as a cold FTP-75, to the original city and highway tests for determination of vehicle fuel economy.

== History ==
By the 1990s, it was recognized that some causes of vehicle emissions encountered on the road were not being adequately captured in the standard dynamometer cycles. These conditions included the use of air conditioning. In response, the EPA developed test cycles and procedures to test air conditioning use. The first proposal, in 1995, included the use of a "start control cycle" (SC01) over which emissions associated with air conditioning could be measured. This cycle was revised to better reflect in-use speeds and accelerations, resulting in the SC03 cycle. The SC03 was finalized in 1996, and implemented for vehicle certification starting in the 2000 model year.

== Description ==
The SC03 lasting 9.9 minutes and covers 3.6-mile (5.8 km). The cycle averages 22 mph (35 km/h) with a maximum speed of 54.8 mph (88.2 km/h). Five stops are included, idling occurs 19 percent of the time and acceleration of 5.1 mph/sec is achieved. Engine temperatures begin warm.

During the SC03 air conditioning test, the ambient temperature is raised to 95 °F (35 °C), and the vehicle's climate control system set to cool the passenger compartment.

== See also ==
- Fuel economy in automobiles
- United States vehicle emission standards
- National Vehicle Fuel and Emissions Laboratory (NVFEL)
