= LA 4 =

LA 4, LA-4 or LA Four may refer to:

- Louisiana Highway 4, abbreviated as LA 4
- Louisiana's 4th congressional district, abbreviated as LA-4
- "L.A. Four", the media term for the perpetrators of the 1992 attack on Reginald Denny
- The L.A. Four (band), a 1970s jazz band also known as the L.A. 4
- The UDDS (Urban Dynamometer Driving Schedule), also known as the LA4, used to test vehicle emissions and fuel economy
- Lake LA-4 Buccaneer, an amphibious aircraft
