= US06 =

American passenger car fuel economy test series

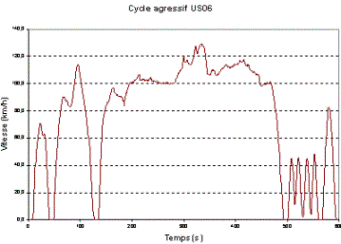
EPA US06 supplemental driving cycle

The US06 is a driving cycle representing high speed and aggressive acceleration conditions. It is used by the US Environmental Protection Agency (EPA) to measure tailpipe emissions and fuel economy of passenger cars on a vehicle dynamometer.

The US06 is part of the "Supplemental Federal Test Procedure" (SFTP), which was developed to test driving conditions beyond those encountered in the standard highway (HWFET) and city (FTP-75) driving cycles. In 2008, the EPA added the US06 and SC03 supplemental tests, as well as a cold FTP-75, to the original city and highway tests for determination of vehicle fuel economy.

== History ==
The UDDS driving schedule (later adapted to the FTP-75) was originally adopted for federal vehicle emissions testing in 1972. However, this driving cycle had a maximum speed of 57 mph, and the acceleration and deceleration rates were artificially reduced to 3.3 mph/sec (1.5 mps^{2}) due to the limited capabilities of the dynamometers in use at the time. By 1990, it was recognized that these limitations meant that a wide swath of in-use vehicle behavior was not adequately captured by the standard dynamometer tests, and the California Air Resources Board began testing to determine the magnitude of the issue.

Over the next few years, the EPA conducted in-use testing in three different cities (Baltimore, Atlanta, and Spokane, Washington) to analyze the frequency of operations outside the FTP envelope. Multiple cycles based on representative sections of on-road driving data were constructed. Of these, a high speed/load transient control cycle, designated as the US06, was chosen as the best cycle to represent behavior not seen on the FTP.

The use of the SFTP (including the US06) for emissions testing was phased in between 2000 and 2004. In 2008, the US06 was added to the tests used to determine vehicle fuel economy as part of the five-cycle test.

== Description ==
The US06 is a high speed/quick acceleration loop that lasts 10 minutes, covers 8 miles (13 km), averages 48 mph (77 km/h) and reaches a top speed of 80 mph (130 km/h). Four stops are included, and brisk acceleration maximizes at a rate of 8.46 mph (13.62 km/h) per second. The engine begins warm and air conditioning is not used. Ambient temperature varies between 68 °F (20 °C) to 86 °F (30 °C).

The cycle represents an 8.01 mile (12.8 km) route with an average speed of 48.4 miles/h (77.9 km/h), maximum speed 80.3 miles/h (129.2 km/h), and a duration of 596 seconds.

== See also ==
- Fuel economy in automobiles
- United States vehicle emission standards
- National Vehicle Fuel and Emissions Laboratory (NVFEL)
