= United States vehicle emission standards =

Vehicle emission regulations

United States vehicle emission standards are set through a combination of legislative mandates enacted by Congress through Clean Air Act (CAA) amendments from 1970 onwards, and executive regulations managed nationally by the Environmental Protection Agency (EPA), and more recently along with the National Highway Traffic Safety Administration (NHTSA). These standards cover tailpipe pollution, including carbon monoxide, nitrogen oxides, and particulate emissions, and newer versions have incorporated fuel economy standards. However they lag behind European emission standards, which limit air pollution from brakes and tires.

In nearly all cases, these agencies set standards that are expected to be met on a fleet-wide basis from automobile and other vehicle manufacturers, with states delegated to enforce those standards but not allowed to set stricter requirements. California has generally been the exception, having been granted a waiver and given allowance to set stricter standards as it had established its own via the California Air Resources Board prior to the 1970 CAA amendments. Several other states have since also received waivers to follow California's standards, which have also become a de facto standard for vehicle manufacturers to follow.

Vehicle emission standards have generally been points of debate between the government, vehicle manufacturers, and environmental groups, and has become a point of political debate. According to a 2025 study, the 2022 vehicle emission standards increased social welfare by $83 billion (approximately $1,200 per vehicle-buying household), with disproportionately greater benefits for low-income groups ($1,700 per household for the lowest-income group).

== Legislative and regulation history ==
=== Clean Air Act of 1963 (CAA) ===
The Clean Air Act of 1963 (CAA) was passed as an extension of the Air Pollution Control Act of 1955, encouraging the federal government via the United States Public Health Service under the then-Department of Health, Education, and Welfare (HEW) to encourage research and development towards reducing pollution and working with states to establish their own emission reduction programs. The CAA was amended in 1965 with the Motor Vehicle Air Pollution Control Act (MVAPCA) which gave the HEW Secretary authority to set federal standards for vehicle emissions as early as 1967. By 1967, this authority empowered the federal government to establish enforceable emission standards, setting a precedent for addressing transportation-related air pollution on a national scale.

=== California Air Resources Board (CARB) ===
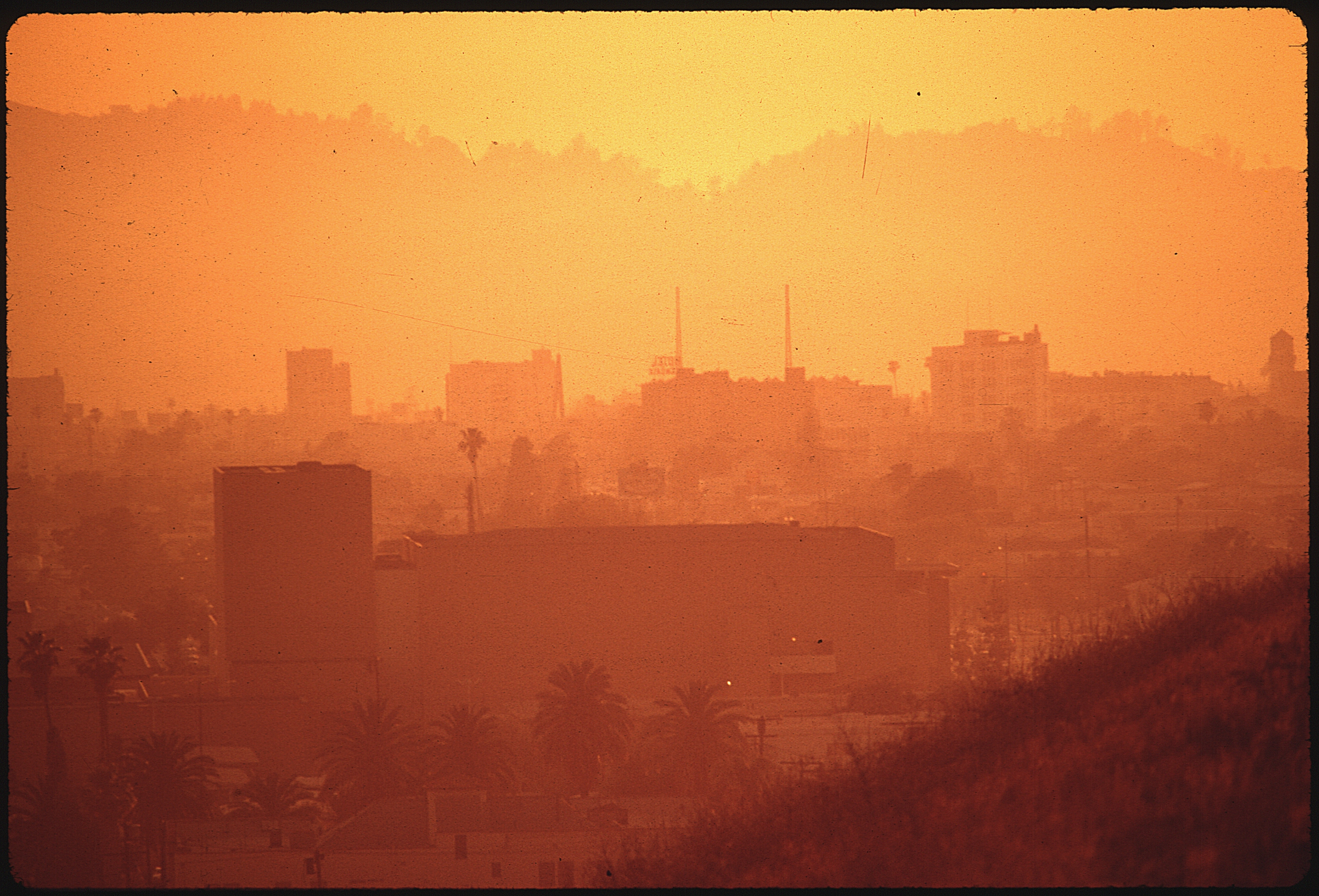
Smog in the Los Angeles valley in 1972

In the mid-20th century, California's economy grew rapidly after the Great Depression, but this economic development was accompanied by an increase in air pollution in the state. As a result, smog started to form in the valleys of Southern California, causing respiratory problems for humans and damaging crops. In the 1960s, Dutch chemist Arie Jan Haagen-Smit identified the air pollutants responsible for the smog: carbon monoxide, hydrocarbons, and nitrogen oxides emitted from cars and factories through inefficient fuel combustion. Haagen-Smit also discovered that these air pollutants react with sunlight to form ozone, a major component of smog. As a response to this situation, the California Air Resources Board (CARB) was established in 1967 with Haagen-Smit as its first chairman. CARB set stringent vehicle emission standards to reduce air pollution in the state. California established the California Air Resources Board (CARB) in 1967, with Haagen-Smit as its first chairman, which among other activities set stringent vehicle emission standards by that year.

Other states were also facing similar air pollution issues at the same time, but fearing that setting too strict a standard would drive away automobile manufacturers, they considered implementing standards that were less restrictive compared to California, potentially creating a patchwork of regulations across the United States. The automobile industry lobbied to Congress, and the CAA was modified in 1967 with the National Emissions Standards Act (also known as the Air Quality Act) that expressly prevented states from setting more restrictive emission standards than the federal levels. However, because California has already established its program, it was granted a waiver and allowed to keep its standards. This Act did give states the authority to perform vehicle inspections programs beyond the requirements for new vehicles, though few states took their own action on this.

=== Formation of the Environmental Protection Agency and the Clear Air Act Amendment of 1970 ===
Air pollution had become a major national focal point by 1970, leading to a major amendment to the CAA. Near the end of 1970, the United States Environmental Protection Agency (EPA) was formed out of an executive order under President Richard Nixon with ratification by Congress to consolidate all of the environmental-related executive-branch programs to a single entity; the new agency was the primary agency for administering the CAA going forward. Among the provisions related to vehicle emissions:

- The 1970 Amendment required EPA to define the National Ambient Air Quality Standards (NAAQS), to be set and updated by the EPA. The NAAQS, at passage of the 1970 amendment, included the pollutants carbon monoxide, nitrogen dioxide, sulfur dioxide, particulate matter, hydrocarbons and photochemical oxidants (such as ozone). Other pollutants, such as lead, were added later based on EPA review of current conditions. Along with the other activities set by the EPA, the states were to create State Implementation Plans (SIP)s to bring their air quality within the NAAQS by 1975.
- The Amendment also required the EPA to define emission standards for new vehicles to help with the NAAQS emission reduction goals, including standards for fuel and testing of new vehicles to make sure these standards are met.

Additionally, the 1970 CAA Amendment continued California's waiver program through which California can seek exemptions from the EPA's emissions requirements as long as theirs are at least as strict as the EPA's vehicle standards.

=== Clear Air Act Amendment of 1977 ===
The EPA's assessment of the state of the country meeting the target NAAQS goals by 1975 was poor, having identified numerous nonattainment areas in the country. With the 1977 Amendment to the CAA, a new deadline of December 31, 1982, for meeting the NAAQS was fixed with no allowance for extending the deadline unless specific control measures were established. Among other key provisions was the establishment of required vehicle inspection and maintenance programs (I/M) in nonattainment states and optional in other areas. This required that states establish emission testing facilities for in-use vehicles to make sure they meet emissions requirements, maintained and repaired as necessary to correct any problems before their license was renewed. The EPA was tasked to establish the basic protocols for these facilities. Other states that had met the NAAQS attainment goals could optionally establish I/M programs for existing but were required to follow the EPA's specifications.

== New vehicle emission standards ==
Due to its preexisting standards and particularly severe motor vehicle air pollution problems in the Los Angeles metropolitan area, the U.S. state of California has special dispensation from the federal government to promulgate its own automobile emissions standards. Other states may choose to follow either the national standard or the stricter California standards. The states that have adopted the California standards are: Colorado, Connecticut, Delaware, Maine, Maryland, Massachusetts, New Jersey, New Mexico (2011 model year and later), New York, Nevada, Oregon, Pennsylvania, Rhode Island, Vermont, and Washington (2009 model year and later), as well as the District of Columbia. Such states are frequently referred to as "CARB states" in automotive discussions because the regulations are defined by the California Air Resources Board.

The EPA adopted the Californian fuel economy and greenhouse gas standard as a national standard by the 2016 model year and collaborated with Californian regulators on stricter national emissions standards for model years 2017–2025.

=== Criteria pollutants ===
==== Light-duty vehicles ====
Light-duty vehicles are certified for compliance with emission standards by measuring their tailpipe emissions during rigorously defined driving cycles that simulate a typical driving pattern. Starting with model year 1972, the UDDS test cycle was used for criteria pollutant testing; this switched in 1975 to the similar FTP-75. The FTP-75 ("city") driving test averages about 21 miles per hour (34 km/h)). Additional tests have supplemented the FTP, including the HWFET highway driving test (averaging about 48 miles per hour (77 km/h)), the high speed, high acceleration US06, and the SC03, which includes air conditioning.

Stricter emission standards for light-duty vehicles in the United States were defined as a result of the Clean Air Act Amendments of 1990. These standards specifically restrict emissions of carbon monoxide (CO), oxides of nitrogen (NO_{x}), particulate matter (PM), formaldehyde (HCHO), and non-methane organic gases (NMOG) or non-methane hydrocarbons (NMHC). The limits are defined in grams per mile (g/mi). The first of these stricter standards (known as Tier 1) was adopted in 1991 and phased in from 1994 to 1997. Subsequent standards, labelled Tiers 2 through 4, were introduced later.

===== Tier 1: 1994–1999 =====
These standards were phased in from 1994 to 1997 and were phased out in favor of the national Tier 2 standard from 2004 to 2009.

Tier I standards cover vehicles with a gross vehicular weight rating (GVWR) below 8,500 pounds (3,856 kg) and are divided into five categories: one for passenger cars, and four for light-duty trucks (which include SUVs and minivans) divided up based on the vehicle weight and cargo capacity.

California's Low-emission vehicle (LEV) program defines six automotive emission standards which are stricter than the United States' national Tier regulations. Each standard has several targets depending on vehicle weight and cargo capacity; the regulations cover vehicles with test weights up to 14,000 pounds (6,400 kg). Listed in order of increasing stringency, the standards are:

- TLEV – Transitional low-emission vehicle
- LEV – Low-emission vehicle
- ULEV – Ultra-low-emission vehicle
- SULEV – Super-ultra low-emission vehicle
- ZEV – Zero-emission vehicle The last category is largely restricted to electric vehicles and hydrogen cars, although such vehicles are usually not entirely non-polluting. In those cases, the other emissions are transferred to another site, such as a power plant or hydrogen reforming center, unless such sites run on renewable energy.

Standards for carbon monoxide (CO) emissions at cold temperatures (20 °F (−7 °C)) were also adopted and phased in at the same schedule as the other Tier 1 standards. Cold CO emissions are measured over the FTP-75 driving cycle.

===== Transitional NLEV: 1999–2003 =====
A set of transitional and initially voluntary "national low-emission vehicle" (NLEV) standards were in effect starting in 1999 for northeastern states and 2001 in the rest of the country until Tier II, adopted in 1999, began to be phased in from 2004 onwards. The National Low Emission Vehicle program covered vehicles below 6,000 pounds (2,700 kg) GVWR and adapted the national standards to accommodate California's stricter regulations.

===== Supplemental Federal Test Procedure (SFTP) =====
Between 2000, and 2004, a Supplemental Federal Test Procedure (SFTP) was phased in, requiring vehicles be tested on other cycles in addition to the FTP-75. The additional cycles in the SFTP are:

- US06: A high speed and high acceleration cycle.
- SC03: Cycle intended to measure emissions in an urban setting at high temperature with air conditioning.

Pollutant standards for NMHC+NOx were a weighted average combining measurements from the FTP-75 and the two SFTP cycles.

===== Tier 2: 2004–2009 =====
Instead of basing emissions on vehicle weight, Tier II standards are divided into several numbered "bins". Eleven bins were initially defined, with bin 1 being the cleanest (zero-emission vehicle) and 11 the dirtiest. However, bins 9, 10, and 11 are temporary. Only the first ten bins were used for light-duty vehicles below 8,500 pounds (3,900 kg) GVWR, but medium-duty passenger vehicles up to 10,000 pounds (4,500 kg) GVWR and to all 11 bins. Manufacturers can make vehicles which fit into any of the available bins, but still must meet average targets for their entire fleets.

The two least-restrictive bins for passenger cars, 9 and 10, were phased out at the end of 2006. However, bins 9 and 10 were available for classifying a restricted number of light-duty trucks until the end of 2008, when they were removed along with bin 11 for medium-duty vehicles. As of 2009, light-duty trucks must meet the same emissions standards as passenger cars.

Tier II regulations also defined restrictions for the amount of sulfur allowed in gasoline and diesel fuel, since sulfur can interfere with the operation of advanced exhaust treatment systems such as selective catalytic converters and diesel particulate filters. Sulfur content in gasoline was limited to an average of 120 parts-per-million (maximum 300 ppm) in 2004, and this was reduced to an average 30 ppm (maximum 80 ppm) for 2006. Ultra-low-sulfur diesel began to be restricted to a maximum 15 ppm in 2006 and refiners are to be 100% compliant with that level by 2010.

A second round of California standards, known as Low Emission Vehicle II, is timed to coordinate with the Tier 2 rollout.

The PZEV and AT-PZEV ratings are for vehicles which achieve a SULEV II rating and also have systems to eliminate evaporative emissions from the fuel system and which have 150,000-mile/15-year warranties on emission-control components. Several ordinary gasoline vehicles from the 2001 and later model years qualify as PZEVs. If a PZEV has technology that can also be used in ZEVs like an electric motor or high-pressure gaseous fuel tanks for compressed natural gas (CNG) or liquefied petroleum gas (LPG), it qualifies as an AT-PZEV.

Diesel particulate filters became a requirement in 2014; gasoline vehicles were exempt.

Within the Tier II ranking, there is a subranking ranging from BIN 1–10, with 1 being the cleanest (Zero Emission vehicle) and 10 being the dirtiest. The former Tier 1 standards that were effective from 1994 until 2003 were different between automobiles and light trucks (SUVs, pickup trucks, and minivans), but Tier II standards are the same for both types.

===== Tier 3 =====
The phase-in of new tailpipe and evaporative emission standards begin to phase-in beginning with the 2017 model year along with new fuel standards.

===== Tier 4 =====
New standards were set in March 2024 to be phased in beginning with the 2027 model year.

==== Heavy-duty vehicles ====
Heavy-duty vehicles must comply with more stringent exhaust emission standards and requires ultra-low sulfur diesel (ULSD) fuel (15 ppm maximum) beginning in 2007 model year.

=== Greenhouse gases ===
Federal emissions regulations cover the primary component of vehicle exhaust, carbon dioxide (CO_{2}). Since CO_{2} emissions are proportional to the amount of fuel used, the national Corporate Average Fuel Economy (CAFE) regulations were historically the primary way in which automotive CO_{2} emissions were regulated in the U.S. The EPA faced a lawsuit seeking to compel it to regulate greenhouse gases as a pollutant, Massachusetts v. Environmental Protection Agency.

As of 2007, the California Air Resources Board passed strict greenhouse gas emission standards which are being challenged in the courts.

On September 12, 2007, a judge in Vermont ruled in favor of allowing states to conditionally regulate greenhouse gas (GHG) emissions from new cars and trucks, defeating an attempt by automakers to block state emissions standards. A group of automakers including General Motors, DaimlerChrysler, and the Alliance of Automobile Manufacturers had sued the state of Vermont to block rules calling for a 30 percent reduction in GHG emissions by 2016. Members of the auto industry argued that complying with these regulations would require major technological advances and raise the prices of vehicles as much as $6,000 per automobile. U.S. District Judge William K. Sessions III dismissed these claims in his ruling. "The court remains unconvinced automakers cannot meet the challenge of Vermont and California's (greenhouse gas) regulations," he wrote.

Environmentalists pressed the Administration to grant California a waiver from the EPA for its emissions standards to take effect. Doing so would allow Vermont and other states to adopt these same standards under the Clean Air Act. Without such a waiver, Judge Sessions wrote, the Vermont rules will be invalid.

==== Light-duty vehicles ====
===== 2010–2016 =====
In 2009, President Obama announced a new national fuel economy and emissions policy that incorporated California's contested plan to curb greenhouse gas emissions on its own, apart from federal government regulations.

The standards are formatted such that each vehicle has an emissions target as a function of the product of its wheelbase and average track width with separate functions for passenger cars and light trucks with progressively smaller targets by model year. Thus each manufacturer has a unique standard for each model year based on the characteristics of vehicles it actually produces. The new standards established a credit trading system whereby manufacturers that overperform their annual target may sell credits to other manufacturers which they then may use to meet a credit shortfall it has from failing to meet its standards through emissions improvements.

The combined fleet fuel economy for new cars and trucks with a GVWR of 10,000 pounds (4,500 kg) or less was projected to average 35.5 miles per gallon (mpg) for the 2016 model year based on the newly established targets and projected fleet mix. The average for its cars will have to be 42 mpg, and for its trucks will be 26 mpg by 2016, in coordination with new CAFE standards. If the average fuel economy of a manufacturer's annual fleet of vehicle production falls below its defined standard, the manufacturer must pay a penalty, then US$5.50 per 0.1 mpg under the standard, multiplied by the manufacturer's total production for the U.S. domestic market. This is in addition to any gas guzzler tax, if applicable.

Should CAFE targets have been extended through to 2026 under the Obama administration, it would have sought a 54 mpg industry-wide average fuel efficiency for cars and light trucks manufactured in 2026 or later, with automobile manufacturers instructed to increase the fuel economy across all of their vehicles by 5% each year.

===== Trump-era rollback and Biden-era reversal (2017–2021) =====
After Donald Trump was inaugurated as president in 2017, he instructed the NHTSA and EPA to rollback Obama's CAFE standards, increasing the 2026 target to a then-projected 202 g CO_{2}/mi and requiring only an annual 1.5% fleet efficiency improvement. The new rule was issued in March 2020. The Trump administration argued the rollback was required due to the increasing costs of cars on consumers that higher efficiencies would only make more expensive. The move was criticized by several environmentalists, Consumer Reports, as well as the state of California, as the ruling coincided with Trump's efforts to remove the waiver for California emissions exemptions.

Following Joe Biden becoming president in 2021, he signed Executive Order 14057, "Catalyzing Clean Energy Industries and Jobs Through Federal Sustainability", which in addition to committing the federal government to implement clean transport options such as EVs, also committed to improving the fuel efficiency standards and reversing the Trump administration's actions. The EPA issued a new rule in December 2021, to become enforceable by February 2022, that effectively restored the Obama-era standards, through decreasing the fleet-wide emissions target to a projected 161 g CO_{2}/mi by the 2026 model year.

Which was then changed back to 202g/mile by Trump in December of 2025.

=== Consumer ratings ===
==== Air pollution score ====
EPA's air pollution score represents the amount of health-damaging and smog-forming airborne pollutants the vehicle emits. Scoring ranges from 0 (worst) to 10 (best). The pollutants considered are nitrogen oxides (NOx), particulate matter (PM), carbon monoxide (CO), formaldehyde (HCHO), and various hydrocarbon measures – non-methane organic gases (NMOG), and non-methane hydrocarbons (NMHC), and total hydrocarbons (THC). This score does not include emissions of greenhouse gases (but see Greenhouse gas score, below).

==== Greenhouse gas score ====
EPA's greenhouse gas score reflects the amount of greenhouse gases a vehicle will produce over its lifetime, based on typical consumer usage. The scoring is from 0 to 10, where 10 represents the lowest amount of greenhouse gases.

The Greenhouse gas score is determined from the vehicle's estimated fuel economy and its fuel type. The lower the fuel economy, the more greenhouse gas is emitted as a by-product of combustion. The amount of carbon dioxide emitted per liter or gallon burned varies by fuel type, since each type of fuel contains a different amount of carbon per gallon or liter.

The ratings reflect carbon dioxide (CO_{2}), nitrous oxide (N_{2}O) and methane (CH_{4}) emissions, weighted to reflect each gas's relative contribution to the greenhouse effect.

=== California emission standards ===
Under Section 209 of the Clean Air Act (CAA), California is given the ability to apply for special waivers to apply its own emission standards for new motor vehicles that are at least as stringent as the federal standards. California applies for this waiver through the EPA, which publishes the proposed standards for public review in the Federal Register. Based on its own review and public comments, the EPA then grants the waiver unless it has determined that California's requested standards were "arbitrary and capricious" in their findings, that the standards are not needed to "meet compelling and extraordinary conditions", or otherwise are inconsistent with other aspects of the CAA.

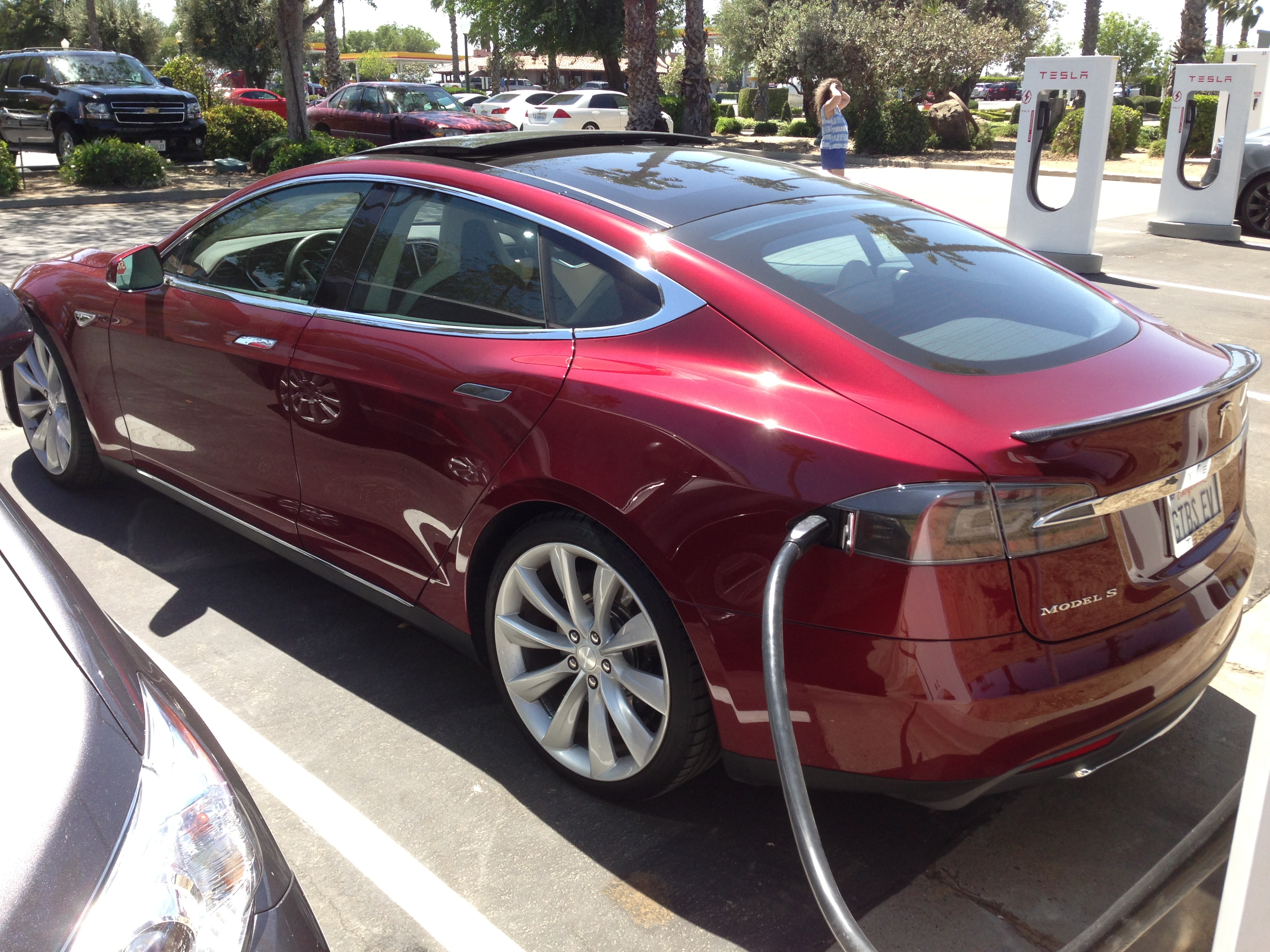
All electric/battery cars, like those of Tesla, are considered zero-emissions vehicles (ZEV) under California's ZEV mandate.

Since the CAA's passage in 1967, California has applied and received more than fifty waivers, which include emission standards across various vehicle classes. Among these include two special sets of waivers:

- California initiated its zero-emission vehicle (ZEV) mandate in 1990. ZEV are defined as vehicles that have no exhaust or evaporative emissions of any regulated pollutant. Vehicle manufacturers were a percentage of their fleet meeting these ZEV standards over a long-term schedule (2% by model year 1998 at its start), but the mandate schedule has shifted based on the unplanned rate of technology advancement and costs, and as of 2020, its current target is to reach 8% ZEV by 2025 determined by fleet credits that account for vehicle range as well as contributions from any low-emission vehicles or plug-in hybrids. The EPA granted the initial request in 1990 and several updates.
- California had requested to regulate greenhouse gas emissions (GHG) at stricter levels than federal levels first in 2005 as part of its low-emission vehicle program. The EPA initially refused this waiver based on a decision from the United States Court of Appeals for the District of Columbia Circuit that determined the EPA did not have the authority to regulate GHG under the CAA; this ruling was challenged in the Supreme Court case Massachusetts v. Environmental Protection Agency (549 U.S. 497 (2007)) which ruled that the EPA did have this authority. In later actions, the EPA granted California its GHG waiver by 2009.

On September 21, 2021, CARB proposed a plan to upgrade all engines in cars, trucks, and boats to EPA "Tier 3" levels by the end of 2024, and the "Tier 4" level, which is more restrictive, by 2035. Tier 4 engine technology does not yet exist. The Sportfishing Association of California and Golden Gate Fishermen’s Association argued against this proposal on the basis on the upgrades to their boats would be economically disastrous and would lead to charging their customers higher ticket cost, and affect their ability to stay in business. The two sides reached a compromise to upgrade to Tier 3 and delay the Tier 4 update for when the technology is available and cost effective.

In November 2022, CARB finalized a rule for MY 2026 through 2035 called Advanced Clean Cars II (ACCII). ZEV sales requirements, starting from 35% to 100%, are for manufacturers with annual sales between 4,501 and 60,000 vehicles. 100% ZEV mandate by 2035, includes up to 20% of PHEVs by referring them as TZEV (Transitional Zero Emission Vehicle) and rest of the proportion with BEVs and FCEVs.

==== State adoption of California Standards ====
Section 177 of the CAA grants the ability for states to adopt California emission standards instead of federal ones. As of December 2021, the following states have adopted the California standards, including their standards for ZEV and GHG:

State	Adopted (by model year)		
State	Criteria Pollutant Regulation	GHG Regulation	ZEV Program
California	1992	2009	1990
New York	1993	2009	1993
Massachusetts	1995	2009	1995
Vermont	2000	2009	2000
Maine	2001	2009	2001
Pennsylvania	2001	2009	—N/a
Connecticut	2008	2009	2008
Rhode Island	2008	2009	2008
Washington	2009	2009	—N/a (Note: Washington passed legislation to meet California's ZEV standards by model year 2022 in March 2020)
Oregon	2009	2009	2009
New Jersey	2009	2009	2009
Maryland	2011	2011	2011
Delaware	2014	2014	—N/a
Colorado	2022	2022	2023
Nevada	2025	2025	2025
Virginia	2025	2025	2025

==== Revocation of waivers under the first Trump administration ====
In his first term, US president Donald Trump stated his concern about California's stricter emission standards and their impact on the costs of manufacturing on the automobile industry, though some political analysts asserted this also tied in with Trump's conservative ideology conflicting with California's more liberal stance. Along with the Obama-era mileage goals, Trump had expressed his intent to revoke California's waivers early on in his presidency.

Shortly after Ford, Volkswagen, Honda, and BMW announced their intentions to commit to the Obama-era mileage goals and California's emission standards across their fleets in July 2019, Trump announced his intention to rollback California's waivers. As part of Trump's "Safer, Affordable, Fuel-Efficient" (SAFE) program, the EPA and NHTSA proposed a new "One National Program Rule" that asserted that only the federal government may set emissions standards on September 19, 2019, as to have one consistent set of fuel emission and mileage standards across the country. This rule would include revoking the last set of California waivers that the EPA had granted California in 2013 for its GHG and ZEV programs. California retained its ability to set emission standards that address ozone-formation under the rule.

Subsequent to this rule, California led a collation of 23 states to sue the NHTSA in California v. Chao (Case 1:19-cv-02826) in the D.C. District Court in September 2019, asserting the agency, in setting the rule, violated the intent of the CAA. The same group of states also filed suit against the EPA once the EPA issued the revoking of the 2013 waiver in November 2019, in California v. Wheeler (Case 19-1239) in the United States Court of Appeals for the District of Columbia Circuit to challenge the EPA's revoking. Both Minnesota and New Mexico, plaintiffs in both cases, stated they would take steps to adapt California's standards in their states as a result.

==== Restoration of waivers under the Biden administration ====
Following the election of Joe Biden as president, the EPA and NHTSA moved to reverse the 2019 rule in April 2021, thus returning to the previous status quo for California. Following the EPA granting California its latest request for exemption, seventeen states sued the EPA in May 2022, arguing that because of the impact of California emission standards on vehicle manufacturing, the EPA's actions violate the equal sovereignty granted to the states by the Constitution, since it gives California more power than other states in setting emissions regulations.

==== Revocation of waivers under the second Trump administration ====
On January 20, 2025, the first day of his second term, President Trump signed Executive Order 14154 ("Unleashing American Energy") calling for elimination of EPA waivers that allow states to effectively prohibit the sales of gasoline-powered cars. On June 12, 2025, Trump signed three Congressional Review Act (CRA) resolutions passed by Congress, which revoked the 2024 reissuance of California's waivers. In an unusual move, the U.S. Senate overrode the ruling of its own parliamentarian that the resolutions went beyond the scope of the CRA, a ruling concurring with a previous Government Accountability Office determination. California and eleven other states filed a lawsuit the same day challenging the legality of the resolutions.

== Non-road engines ==
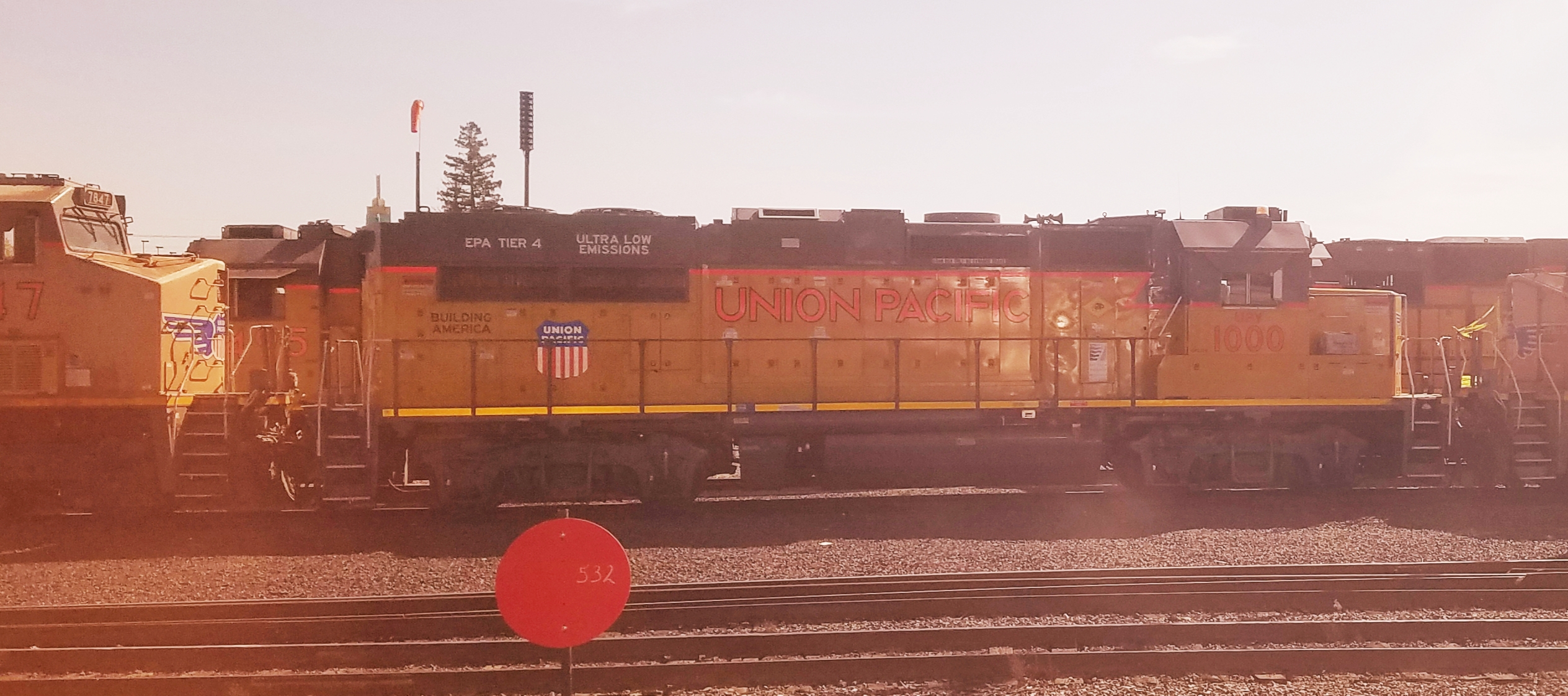
Non-road engines include railway locomotives like this EMD GP38 modified to meet Tier 4 standards.

Non-road engines, including equipment and vehicles that are not operated on the public roadways, are used in an extremely wide range of applications, each involving great differences in operating characteristics and engine technology. Emissions from all non-road engines are regulated by categories.

In the United States, the emission standards for non-road diesel engines are published in the US Code of Federal Regulations, Title 40, Part 89 (40 CFR Part 89). Tier 1–3 Standards were adopted in 1994 and was phased in between 1996 and 2000 for engines over 37 kW (50 hp). In 1998 the regulation included engines under 37 kW and introduced more stringent Tier 2 and Tier 3 standards which was scheduled to be phased in between 2000 and 2008. In 2004, US EPA introduced the more stringent Tier 4 standards which was scheduled to be phased in between 2008 and 2015. The testing cycles used for certification follow the ISO 8178 standards.

== Small engines ==
Pollution from small engines, such as those used in gas-powered groundskeeping equipment reduces air quality. Emissions from small offroad engines are regulated by the EPA. Specific pollutants subject to limits include hydrocarbons, carbon monoxide, and nitrogen oxides.

== Existing vehicle emissions standard ==
Testing of existing vehicle emissions, also known as vehicle inspection and maintenance programs (I/M) were introduced as part of the 1977 Amendments to the CAA. The 1970 Amendments introduced target NAAQS goals for air quality which were not met in many parts of the country. With the 1977 Amendments, the CAA required I/M programs in non-attainment states as part of their pollution prevent plans.

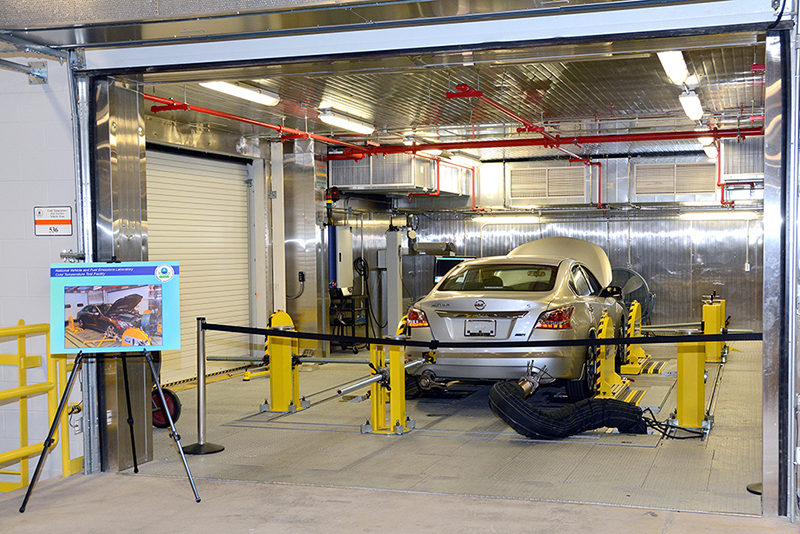
A representative dynamometer-based emissions test station

For model years prior to 1996, emissions tests were performed using a chassis dynamometer-based test; The vehicle is driven so that the wheels of its main driven axle (front or rear) sit atop the dynamometer rotors, when then are unlocked to rotate freely. A special collections line is attached to the tailpipe, and simulated airflow is pushed across the engine to simulate vehicle movement. The test operator then presses the accelerator of the car through a fixed test schedule: the acceleration from the engine translates to force and torque that are measured through the dynamometer, simultaneously mapped against analysis of the emissions from the tailpipe. After completion of the schedule, the computerized system calculates the emissions from the car and determines if it meets the appropriate specification for its model year.

Since model year 1994, all LDV and LDT manufactured for use in the United States are required to use the standard on-board diagnostic OBD-II system. This is a computerized system that continually monitors the performance of the engine and its emission control system. Instead of the dynamometer test, the operator hooks the OBD-II to a standard computer system which downloads the information from the computer. It will warn the operator if the OBD-II determines significant deviations from expected emissions control standards, indicating repairs may be needed.

State Emissions
Name	Light duty gasoline	Emissions testing	Light-duty diesel	Emissions testing	Heavy-duty diesel	Emissions testing	Special notes
Alabama		No emissions testing required		No emissions testing required			Alabama maintains "volunteer emission testing"
Alaska		No emissions testing required.		No emissions testing required.			Alaska requires a "proof of insurance" to register a car from out-of-state.
Arizona	Model Years ≥1967 but more than 5 model years old (Pima County/ Maricopa County)	Biennially	1967–2007 (Pima County/ Maricopa County)	Pima County: 30 percent opacity Maricopa County: 20 percent opacity	Maricopa County	J1667 test protocol Model year <1991: 55 percent opacity Model year ≥1991: 40 percent opacity	Only state which still conduct emission testing dating back to the 1967 model year unlike other states using EPA classification (a few still conduct test for 1968–present (1968+ testing is for jurisdictions using defined EPA standards for vehicle classification since the '68 model year and beyond automobiles must have an exhaust emission system – PCV system, air injection pump, controlled spark module) e.g. the absence of a rolling chassis exemption – in some states when an automobile reaches an age limit (as in 25 model years old) the vehicle is exempted or pertaining to motor vehicle laws e.g. classic automobile registration and displaying vintage license plates
Arkansas		No emissions testing required.		No emissions testing required.			Arkansas maintains "volunteer emissions testing".
California (Further information: California Smog Check Program)	vehicles 1976 and newer model-year gas-powered, hybrid, and flex-fuel vehicles; exemptions: new car = ≤6 model-years old are exempt; change of ownership = ≤4 model-years old are exempt	required biennially for registration renewal; 2000 model-year and newer receive only visual and OBDII inspections	vehicles 1998 and newer model-year diesel-powered vehicles with a GVWR ≤14,000 pounds; exemptions: none applicable to diesel-powered vehicles	required biennially for registration renewal; 1998 model-year and newer receive only visual and OBDII inspections	California-based fleets of 2 or more heavy-duty vehicles with a GVWR >14,000 pounds	Periodic Smoke Inspection Program (PSIP) an annual smoke and tamper self-inspection; exemptions: new vehicle = ≤4 model-years old are exempt	Prior to 2004 emission testing included 1966 and newer model year automobiles – 1984 calendar year phased in the use of an acceleration simulated mode test criteria – a 1998 state law made pre-1973 automobiles exempt from emission testing where it temporarily included a 30-year rolling chassis exemption which was repealed in 2006 where 1976 and newer are subjected to state mandated emission testing – California visual inspection strictest in the USA (also similar to Japanese 'Shaken' vehicle laws which is their equivalent of vehicle inspection) which serves as a model for other states implementing I/M (inspection/maintenance) programs
Colorado	Vehicles older than 7 years old required. Specially/Collector registered cars made before 1975 and special vehicles may be exempted. (NOTE: vehicles over 32 years old with collector plates are not exempt from emissions testing and they need to be emissions tested every 5 years, with addition of mileage restriction less than 4,500 miles. Unless if it's grandfathered-in before 1st of September, 2009)	Biennially when required	Exempt for first four model years of diesel vehicles.	When outside exemption, vehicles up to 32 years old – biennially, else annually. OBD testing done when newer than 10 years	Exempt for first four model years of diesel vehicles.	When outside exemption, diesel trucks less than 10 years – Biennially else annually.	Only on high population corridor encompassing Castle Rock to Wellington, including Boulder and Greeley. Required for vehicles used in this area. Dynamometer testing used.
Connecticut	more than 4 model years old but less than 25 model years old	Biennially (OBDII)	more than 4 model years old but less than 25 model years old	Biennially		Exempt	
Delaware	Over 7 model years old but not older than 1967.	Biennially (OBDII)	Over 7 model years old but not older than 1998	Biennially or Annually (OBDII or Smoke-opacity test)	Over 4 model years old but not older than 1998	Annually (OBDII or Smoke-opacity test)	Delaware does require it statewide, except for vehicles provided with exemptions
Florida	No emissions testing required		No emissions testing required		No emissions testing required		Florida stopped requiring emissions testing since 2000
Georgia	Over 3 years old but not older than 25 years old, and light-duty (less than 8,500lbs)	Annually (Atlanta metro area only)	Exempt		Exempt		Georgia – only required only in the 13-county metro Atlanta. some cars are exempt.
Hawaii	No emissions testing required.		No emissions testing required.		No emissions testing required.		Hawaii requires periodic safety inspections for most vehicles.
Idaho	No emissions testing required. (since 1st of July, 2023)		No emissions testing required. (since 1st of July, 2023)		No emissions testing required. (since 1st of July, 2023)		Idaho stopped requiring emissions testing (since 1st of July, 2023).
Illinois	After the vehicle is 4 years old, but not older than 1996.	Biennially [OBDII].	Diesel vehicles are not tested for emissions.	Exempt.	Diesel vehicles are not tested for emissions.	Exempt.	Required only in the Chicago metropolitan area and eastern suburbs of St. Louis, Missouri. Vehicles manufactured before 1968 as well as vehicles manufactured before 1996 that were grandfathered-in (in compliance with Illinois vehicle emissions laws in 2007), motorcycles, mopeds, diesel-powered vehicles, electric vehicles, kit cars, and vehicles that are registered as antiques, expanded-use antique, street rods and farm vehicles are exempt from emissions testing.
Indiana	After the vehicle is 4 years old but not older than 1976	Biennially.	Diesel vehicles are not tested for emissions.	Exempt.	Diesel vehicles are not tested for emissions.	Exempt.	Required in Lake County and Porter County (Chicago metropolitan area)/Northwest Indiana only. Vehicles made pre-1976, diesel and electric vehicles, motorcycles and mopeds, antique and show cars that are over 25 years old are exempt from emissions testing.
Iowa	No emissions testing required.		No emissions testing required.		No emissions testing required.		Iowa doesn't require emissions testing for most vehicles.
Kansas	No emissions testing required.		No emissions testing required.		No emissions testing required.		While Kansas doesn't require safety or emissions testing for vehicles, Out-Of-State vehicles must be VIN inspected.
Kentucky	No emissions testing required.		No emissions testing required.		No emissions testing required.		Kentucky's emissions testing requirement ended in 2005.
Louisiana	After the vehicle is more than 2 years old but not older than 1980 or 25 years old if it's registered as an antique and exhibition vehicles.	Annually	Diesel vehicles are not tested for emissions.	Exempt	Diesel vehicles are not tested for emissions.	Exempt	Only in the Baton Rouge metropolitan area parishes of Ascension, East Baton Rouge, Iberville, Livingston, and West Baton Rouge. Cars registered in these five parishes must be inspected in one of the five parishes; cars from outside those parishes (excluding the cities of New Orleans, Kenner and Westwego) may be inspected in the Baton Rouge area.
Maine		Annually.		Exempt (for diesel vehicles with a GVWR less than 18,000lbs)	Only Diesel Vehicles with a GVWR of more than 18,000lbs are required	Annually.	Only in Cumberland County. which includes the city of Portland.
Maryland	Required for vehicles more than 2 years old, but not older than 1996.	Biennially.	Diesel vehicles are not tested for emissions.	Exempt.	Diesel vehicles are not tested for emissions.	Exempt	Required in 13 (out of 23) counties and the independent city of Baltimore. Hybrid vehicles that achieve an EPA gas mileage rating of at least 50 miles per gallon are exempt from testing for 3 years after their model year, after which they are then tested at the standard two-year intervals. Also the most recent two model years of vehicles, motorcycles, farm trucks, historic vehicles, heavy duty vehicles, kit cars and vehicles of model year 1995 or older are exempt from emissions testing.
Massachusetts	Every year	OBDII	Every year	OBDII	8,501 to 14,000 lbs (Medium duty) 14,000 lbs+ (Heavy duty)	Medium Duty: OBDII Heavy duty: J1667 Protocol	annually, as of 2008. Vehicles less than 15 years old must pass an OBD-2 scan for emissions system compliance. Vehicles over 15 years old receive a visual check and must not 'produce visible smoke'. Prior to 2008, an emissions inspection was required biennially based on the vehicle's model year (odd-numbered model years were inspected in odd-numbered years, even-numbered model years were inspected in even-numbered years). Also in 2008, the tailpipe test for 1995 model year and older vehicles was discontinued.
Michigan	No emissions testing required.		No emissions testing required.		No emissions testing required.		Michigan requires safety inspection for salvage vehicles and VIN inspection for Out-Of-State vehicles.
Minnesota	No emissions testing required.		No emissions testing required.		No emissions testing required.		Minnesota stopped requiring emissions testing since 1999.
Mississippi	No emissions testing required.		No emissions testing required.		No emissions testing required.		
Missouri	Required for light duty gas-powered vehicles (8,500lbs or less).	Biennially [OBDII].	Required for light duty diesel-powered vehicles (8,500lbs or less).	Biennially [OBDII].	Exempt (as vehicles over 8,500lbs are exempt from emissions testing).	Exempt	Required only in St. Louis City, St. Louis County, St. Charles County, and Jefferson County. Historic vehicles, motorcycles, mopeds, any vehicle with a GVWR of over 8.500lbs, electric vehicles, vehicles driven less than 12,000 miles between biennial safety inspections, and vehicles of model year 1995 or older do not require an emissions testing.
Montana	No emissions testing required.		No emissions testing required.		No emissions testing required.		
Nebraska	No emissions testing required.		No emissions testing required.		No emissions testing required.		Nebraska does require a VIN inspection for Out-Of-State vehicles.
Nevada	1968 model year or newer. New vehicles are exempt on their first three registrations; testing is required at the fourth. Hybrids are exempt for five model years. Motorcycles or mopeds, trimobiles, alternative fuel vehicles, vehicles registered as a Classic Rod, Classic Vehicle or Old Timer and driven 5,000 miles or less per year, Replica Vehicles, fleet vehicles participating in the Continuous Monitoring program, and transfers of ownership tested within the preceding 90 days (180 days from a NV dealer) are also exempt.	Annually. OBDII testing for 1996 model year or newer; Two-Speed Idle Test for older vehicles.	1968 model year or newer. New vehicles are exempt for their first three registrations; testing is required at the fourth. GVWR ≥14,001 exempt, as are full time four wheel drive light duty diesels with a wheelbase ≥184 inches.	Annually. Light duty diesel emission inspections are conducted by using an opacity meter and dynamometer. A visual inspection for tampering of emission control devices is also part of the inspection procedure.			Emissions testing is required in: The Las Vegas Valley and within a five-mile buffer zone around it.; Reno, Sparks, Washoe Valley and most of the area west of Washoe Valley. Testing is also required in the areas north and east of Reno between Interstate 80 and the 40th degree of north latitude (about midway through Pyramid Lake).; Vehicles based in remote areas of Clark and Washoe counties and all other Nevada counties are exempt.
New Hampshire	Required only for model year 1996 and newer vehicles that are less than 20 years old.	Annually [OBDII].	Required only for model year 1997 and newer vehicles that are less than 20 years old.	Annually [OBDII].	Exempt (as vehicles over 8,500lbs are exempt from emissions testing).	Exempt.	Annually, except the first inspection of a new vehicle or upon an ownership transfer is adjusted to expire in the month of the registrant's birthday and is therefore valid for 4 to 15 months. Emissions inspection is required only for model year 1996 and newer vehicles that are less than 20 years old. Effective January 31, 2026, and New Hampshire's car inspections will no longer be required (Including emissions testing in September of 2026 if it's approved by EPA).
New Jersey	Model years ≥ 1996 = Must be inspected biennially. Model years ≤ 1995 = do not require inspection. Model years ≥ 2008 [with a GVWR of between 8,500lbs-14,000lbs] = must be inspected biennially. Model years ≤ 2007 [with a GVWR of between 8,500lbs-14,000lbs] = do not require inspection as well as model years ≥ 2014 [with a GVWR of over 14,000lbs] = Must be inspected biennially. Model years ≤ 2013 [with a GVWR of over 14,000lbs] = do not require an inspection. (NOTE: if it's registered as commercial vehicle, jitney or taxi, they are not exempt from emissions testing regardless of age or weight and they have to do annual tests as well.)	Exempt for the first 5 years, then biennially.	Model years ≥ 1997 Must be inspected biennially. Model years ≤ 1997 do not require inspection.	Exempt for the first 5 years, then biennially.	Exempt, but depends on the weight and usage.	Vehicles exempt from inspection include non-commercial diesel vehicles between 8,500 pounds (3,900 kg) and 10,000 pounds (4,500 kg) GVWR or older than model year 1997 and under 10,000 pounds (4,500 kg) GVWR, diesel trucks between 10,000 pounds (4,500 kg) and 18,000 pounds (8,200 kg) GVWR (subject to self-inspection). Diesel vehicles over 18,000 pounds are not exempt from inspection.	Biennially. Effective January 1, 2010, commercial vehicles (including taxis, limousines, jitneys, and buses) are subject to an annual inspection. Effective August 1, 2010, new non-commercial vehicles are exempt for the first five years. Used non-commercial vehicles are also exempt for the first five model years, as indicated on the New Car Dealer inspection decal.
New Mexico	Model Years <35 years old but more than 4 model years old (Bernalillo County)	Biennially and at change of ownership	Diesel vehicles are not tested for emissions.	Exempt.	Diesel vehicles are not tested for emissions.	Exempt	Biennially, required only for vehicles 35 model years and newer registered in, or commuting to Bernalillo County.
New York	Model Years less than 25 years old but more than 2 model years old.	Annually.	Model Years less than 25 years old but more than 2 model years old.	Annually.	Heavy-duty diesel vehicles with a GVWR of over 8,500lbs are exempt in Upstate, but are not exempt if it's registered within the 5 boroughs of NYC metropolitan area.	Annually (if it's registered in NYC metro area)	Annually. Newly registered vehicles with a current inspection sticker from another state are exempt until the out-of-state sticker expires or for one year after registration in New York, whichever is sooner. Model year 1996 and newer vehicles are subject to an OBD-II emissions inspection, while older cars receive a visual check of emissions components. Until December 31, 2010, vehicles registered in the five boroughs of New York City, as well as on Long Island, in Westchester County or in Rockland County required a tailpipe smog-test if they are not OBD II equipped (they now receive a visual only check of emissions control devices). All OBD II vehicles in those areas (1996 model year or newer, 1997 and newer for diesel) require an OBD II test plus a visual check of emissions components. Any vehicle 26 model years old or more does not require an emissions check of any sort, and vehicles 2 model years old or newer are exempt. Diesel trucks over 8500 lbs. GVWR are required to have a diesel emissions inspection if they are registered in the NYC metropolitan area.
North Carolina	Required for vehicles more than 3 years old/or 70,000 miles on the clock whichever comes first, but less than 20 years old. In Mecklenburg County, vehicles with a model year of 2017 and newer are exempt from emissions testing.	Annually.	Diesel vehicles are not tested for emissions.	Exempt.	Diesel vehicles are not tested for emissions.	Exempt.	Required for vehicles in 19 (out of 100) counties. Except if it's one of the following vehicles like. Diesel vehicles, cars over 20 years old, brand-new cars less than 3 years old/or 70,000 miles, farm vehicles, EVs and antique vehicles. North Carolina is also trying to get rid of emissions testing by removing it in 18 counties, except for one county which is in Mecklenburg County, which includes the state's largest city of Charlotte.
North Dakota	No emissions testing required.		No emissions testing required.		No emissions testing required.		
Ohio	More than 7 model years old for gasoline-powered vehicles and/or more than 8 model years old for hybrids but less than 25 model years old in the Greater Cleveland area	Biennially (OBDII)	More than 7 model years old for diesel-powered vehicles but less than 25 model years old in the Greater Cleveland area	Biennially (OBDII)	Vehicles with a GVWR of over 10,000lbs are exempt from emissions testing.	Exempt.	Currently required only in the Cleveland metropolitan area (Cuyahoga County, Geauga County, Lake County, Lorain County, Medina County, Portage County, and Summit County). Ohio is trying to get rid of emissions testing if it's approved by the EPA.
Oklahoma	No emissions testing required.		No emissions testing required.		No emissions testing required.		
Oregon	Vehicles must be tested every other year for registration renewal in the Portland and Medford areas. Model Years ≥1975 must be tested in Portland area, and those 20 model year and newer in Medford area. Also all vehicles new to Oregon have to be tested.	Biennially	Same intervals and exemptions as gasoline cars, 8,500 lbs or less	Biennially	≥8,501 lbs	Exempt. NOTE: starting in January 2023, in Clackamas, Multnomah, and Washington counties, medium-duty commercial vehicles (2006 and older) and heavy-duty commercial vehicles (2009 and older) with older diesel engines must be retrofitted with approved technology to be registered or have their registration renewed, failure to do so will not be allowed to renew it's registration in these 3 counties (Portland metro area).	Required only (1975 and newer) in the Portland metro area and (20 years old and newer) in the Medford metro area, diesel-powered vehicles with a GVWR of over 8,500lbs, motorcycles, mopeds, low-speed vehicles, electric vehicles, and brand new cars less than 4 years old are exempt from emissions testing.
Pennsylvania	Any gasoline vehicle with a model year of 1975 and newer and a GVWR of 9,000lbs or less. Motorcycles are exempt.	Annually.	Diesel vehicles are not tested for emissions.	Exempt.	Diesel vehicles are not tested for emissions.	Exempt.	Required in 25 (out of 67) counties. Diesel-powered vehicles, vehicles that are made pre-1975, electric vehicles, motorcycles, vehicles that are driven less than 5,000 miles between annual safety inspections, vehicles that are registered antiques, expanded-use antiques, classics and street rods are exempt from emissions inspection.
Rhode Island	more than 2 models years old (inclusive) or 24,000 miles (inclusive).	Biennially (OBDII).	more than 2 models years old (inclusive) or 24,000 miles (inclusive).	Biennially (OBDII).	more than 2 models years old (inclusive) or 24,000 miles (inclusive).	Biennially (OBDII).	Effective July 2012, any state contracted job requiring heavy duty vehicles must be operated with pollution control devices.
South Carolina	No emissions testing required.		No emissions testing required.		No emissions testing required.		
South Dakota	No emissions testing required.		No emissions testing required.		No emissions testing required.		
Tennessee	No emissions testing required.		No emissions testing required.		No emissions testing required.		Tennessee stopped requiring emissions testing since 14th of February, 2022.
Texas	more than 2 model years old to 24 model years old; motorcycles, diesel-powered, and automobiles 25 model years or older exempt from emission testing – includes motor vehicles registered as an Antique or Classic under Texas law (either displaying state-mandated vanity license plate or vintage-era license plates (this also includes past general issue plates from 1975–present with validation stickers used prior to the 1995–present windshield sticker; license plate law in Texas (effective since May 1988) requires new general issue plates after it reaches 8 years of age – license plate law was amended 11.1.16 where TxDMV no longer mandates plate replacement every 8 years with the exception that the license plate is considered legible e.g. loss of reflectivity with the paint base and/or if a license plate is unreadable if a police officer does a probable cause traffic stop)	annually (both OBDII for 1996–present and ASM to 1995 for motor vehicles registered in the DFW Metroplex and Houston Metro area except for 4-wheel drive/all wheel drive powertrains (4WD/AWD including vehicles over 8500 GVW are subjected to the two-speed idle (TSI) testing; TSI testing to 1995 only in El Paso, Travis, and Williamson Counties)	Diesel vehicles are not tested for emissions.	Exempt.	Diesel vehicles are not tested for emissions.	Exempt.	Emission testing mandated for motor vehicles registered in the Houston Metropolitan area (Brazoria, Fort Bend, Galveston, Harris, Montgomery), DFW Metroplex (Collin, Dallas, Denton, Ellis, Johnson, Kaufman, Parker, Rockwall, Tarrant), Austin Metropolitan area (Travis, Williamson), San Antonio (Bexar County will start requiring it in 2026) and El Paso county; since March 1, 2015, inspection stickers no longer issued where an automobile must pass the safety or emission test prior to renewing automobile registration.
Utah	All vehicles registered in Davis, Salt Lake, Utah and Weber counties with model years less than six years old are required to have an emission test once every two years and Vehicles with model years six years old and older (to 1967) must have an emission test every year, and all vehicles registered in Cache County with model years six years old and greater that have even-numbered model years, must have an emission test in even number years, and vehicles with odd-numbered model years must have an emission test in odd-numbered years.	Biennially for the first 6 years, then annually if it's older but not older than 1967 (In Davis, Salt Lake, Utah and Weber counties). Biennially for vehicles more than 6 years old or older but not older than 1996 (for vehicles less than 8,500lbs GVWR), and not older than 2008 (for vehicles more than 8,500lbs GVWR) in Cache county.	All diesel vehicles registered in Davis, Salt Lake, Utah, Weber and Cache counties with model years more than six years old (to 1997) are required to have an emission test once every two years.	Biennially if it's more than 6 years old but not older than 1998 (with a GVWR less than 14,000lbs).	Heavy-duty diesel vehicles (GVWR of over 14,000lbs) are exempt from emissions testing in most counties except for Salt Lake county which requires diesel vehicles 2014 models years and newer to be emissions tested.	Exempt for Davis, Utah, Weber and Cache counties, but not exempt for Salt Lake county for 2014 model years and newer which are tested biennially.	Other vehicles including electric vehicles, street rods, vehicles registered vintage or custom vehicles that are over 30 years old, vehicles registered as off-highway vehicles or farm-vehicles (Implements of husbandry) and motorcycles are exempt from emissions testing.
Vermont	Required for vehicles less than 16 years old.	Annually (OBDII).	Required for diesel vehicles made after 1997 but still has the same rolling exemption as gasoline vehicles.	Annually (OBDII).	Vehicles with a GVWR of over 10,000lbs are exempt.	Exempt	Done at time of State Inspection, with model years 1996 and new with OBDII, some cars are exempt like those 16 years old or older, vehicles with a GVWR of over 10,000lbs, motorcycles, moped, electric vehicles, antique and exhibition vehicles do not have to be emissions tested.
Virginia	more than 2 model years old to 24 model years old	Biennially. First-time registrations exempt if vehicle has received an emissions certificate from certain states within previous 12 months.	newer than 1996 model year	Biennially	GVWR > 8500 lbs. exempt		Emission testing mandated for motor vehicles registered in the counties of Arlington, Fairfax, Loudoun, Prince William, or Stafford, and the cities of Alexandria, Fairfax, Falls Church, Manassas or Manassas Park. Certain hybrids exempt.
Washington		No emissions testing required		No emissions testing required			
West Virginia		No emissions testing required		No emissions testing required			
Wisconsin	Testing required for vehicles model years 1996 and later in Kenosha, Milwaukee, Ozaukee, Racine, Sheboygan, Washington and Waukesha counties (model years 1996 to 2006 up to 8,500 pounds; model years 2007 or newer up to 14,000 pounds) ().	Every other year before registration renewal; after transfer of ownership; after registration in Wisconsin.	Testing required for vehicles model years 1996 and later in Kenosha, Milwaukee, Ozaukee, Racine, Sheboygan, Washington and Waukesha counties: Model years 2007 and newer which have a gross vehicle rating up to 14,000 pounds.	Every other year before registration renewal; after transfer of ownership; after registration in Wisconsin.	Greater than 14,000 lbs.	Exempt	Required only in Kenosha County, Milwaukee County, Ozaukee County, Racine County, Sheboygan County, Washington County, and Waukesha County. brand-new vehicles that are less than 6 years old, collector vehicles that are 20 years old and older and electric vehicles are exempt from testing.
Wyoming	No emissions testing Required.		No emissions testing Required.		No emissions testing Required.		Wyoming does require VIN inspection for Out-Of-State vehicles.

== See also ==
- Regulation of greenhouse gases under the Clean Air Act
- Regulation on non-exhaust emissions
- AP 42 Compilation of Air Pollutant Emission Factors
- Emissions standard
- List of low emissions locomotives
- Motor vehicle emissions
- Portable emissions measurement system
- Timeline of major U.S. environmental and occupational health regulation
- Vehicle emissions control
- Volkswagen emissions scandal
