= HWFET =

American highway driving fuel economy test series

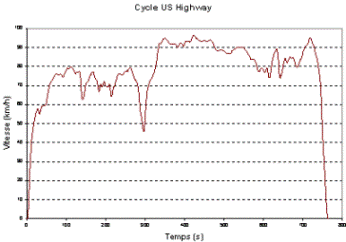
Speed versus time trace of the HWFET

The HWFET or HFET (short for HighWay Fuel Economy Test) is a driving cycle which represents rural highway driving conditions. The HWFET is used by the United States Environmental Protection Agency to test light duty vehicles on a chassis dynamometer. The results of the test are used to determine vehicle fuel economy and emissions.

== Description ==
The HWFET cycle consists of a 10.26 miles (16.51 km) route covered in 765 seconds, with an average speed of 48.3 miles per hour (77.7 km/h). The driving cycle is continuous, with no vehicle stops save for the end of the test.

The HWFET driving cycle is defined in 40 CFR 600.I.

== History ==
Soon after the federal government began emissions and fuel economy testing of vehicles using the UDDS (city cycle), it became apparent that it was not adequate for characterizing vehicle operation in non-urban areas. Some vehicle manufacturers began advertising their own "highway" fuel economy values based on their own tests. In order to standardize testing, the Environmental Protection Agency quickly began developing a driving cycle for highway operation. The cycle was intended to represent vehicle operation in areas where the then-new 55 miles per hour (89 km/h) speed limit was being strictly enforced.

In developing the HWFET cycle, drivers made a number of trips over segments of road in southern Michigan and northern Ohio and Indiana. From these trips, four segments were spliced together to make a representative cycle that reflected the average speed, speed deviation, and stops per mile of all on-road operation on similar road types. A description of the development of the final cycle was published in a technical report.

The HWFET was added to the certification process for light duty vehicles (alongside the FTP-75 "city" test) in the late 1970s to determine emissions and fuel economy. By the early 1980s, however, it was apparent that the HWFET fuel economy results over-predicted the mileage consumers were actually getting on the highway. As a result, the HWFET fuel economy numbers were discounted 22%. As speed limits crept upward, even this adjustment was insufficient. In response, for the 2008 model year, additional fuel economy tests were required for new vehicles. The resulting five-cycle test included weighted results from both the HWFET and the high-speed US06 test cycle.

== Usage ==
The HWFET was originally created as a reference point for fossil fueled vehicles, and emissions are recorded during operation of the cycle. These emissions are typically expressed in g/mile or g/km. Carbon-based emissions (primarily carbon dioxide) are used to determine the fuel usage of the vehicle and thus the fuel economy.

The HWFET is also used to estimate on how many miles an electric vehicle will travel on a single charge.

== See also ==
- United States vehicle emission standards
- Fuel economy in automobiles
- National Vehicle Fuel and Emissions Laboratory (NVFEL)
