= UDDS =

American city driving fuel economy test series

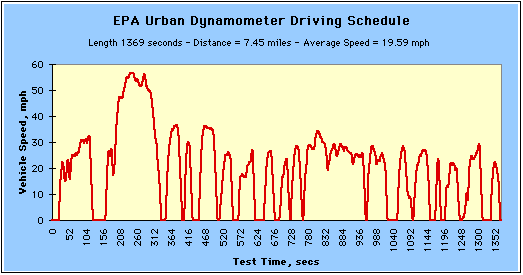
Speed versus time trace of the UDDS

UDDS stands for Urban Dynamometer Driving Schedule, and refers to a driving cycle which represents city driving conditions. The UDDS is used by the United States Environmental Protection Agency to test light duty vehicles on a chassis dynamometer. The results of the test are used to determine vehicle fuel economy and emissions.

The UDDS is also known as the FTP-72 (Federal Test Procedure, 1972) or the LA4. In Sweden it is known as the A10 or CVS cycle, and in Australia as the ADR 27 (Australian Design Rules) cycle.

== Description ==
The UDDS cycle consists of a 7.46 miles (12.01 km) route covered in 1372 seconds. The route contains frequent stops, and has an average speed of 19.6 miles per hour (31.5 km/h). The cycle is broken into two phases (also called "bags"), one consisting of the first 505 seconds of the cycle and the second consisting of the remaining 867 seconds.

== History ==
The first light duty driving cycle used to measure exhaust emissions was adopted in the early 1960s by the California Motor Vehicle Pollution Control Board (a precursor to the California Air Resources Board. However, this early cycle had serious deficiencies, and in 1965 work began on a replacement cycle based on traffic patterns in Los Angeles. Multiple routes were investigated, and the average speed and loads compared to the averages of a broad cross-section of commuters.

One such route, designated the LA4, was chosen as being most representative of wider vehicle usage. This route was a 12 miles (19 km) figure-eight loop running near downtown Los Angeles. By the early 1970s, the federal government was also starting a program intended to test vehicle emissions. Building on the earlier California work, researchers collected vehicle operation data on multiple runs over the LA4 route in Los Angeles. From these data, an average trip was chosen to be most representative and used as a driving cycle. Some portions of the driving cycle were removed to produce a final cycle distance close to 7.5 miles (12.1 km), which was considered to be an average urban trip length. After consultation with manufacturers, acceleration and deceleration rates were capped at 3.3 mph/sec (1.5 mps2). A description of the development of the final cycle was published in a technical paper.

The UDDS was adopted as a standard driving cycle for the certification of light duty vehicles starting with the 1972 model year. In 1975, the cycle was modified by repeating the initial 505 seconds (phase 1) and weighting the results to form the FTP-75 cycle (what is known as the "city test").

== Usage ==
The UDDS was originally created as a reference point for fossil fueled vehicles, and emissions are recorded during operation of the cycle. These emissions are typically expressed in g/mile or g/km. Carbon-based emissions (primarily carbon dioxide) are used to determine the fuel usage of the vehicle and thus the fuel economy.

The UDDS is also used to estimate on how many miles an electric vehicle will travel on a single charge.

== See also ==
- FTP-75 driving cycle
- Fuel economy in automobiles
- United States vehicle emission standards
- National Vehicle Fuel and Emissions Laboratory (NVFEL)
