= FTP-75 =

American passenger car fuel economy test series

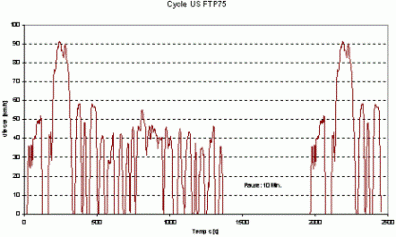
EPA FTP-75 driving cycle

The FTP-75 (Federal Test Procedure 1975) is a driving cycle that represents city driving conditions. It is used by the US Environmental Protection Agency (EPA) to measure tailpipe emissions and fuel economy of passenger cars.

The FTP-75 is also known in Australia as the ADR 37 (Australian Design Rules) cycle and in Brazil as test standard NBR6601.

== History ==
The UDDS was adopted as a standard driving cycle for the certification of light duty vehicles starting with the 1972 model year. This cycle was divided into two phases: the initial 505 seconds and the remaining 867 seconds. In 1975, the UDDS cycle was modified by repeating the initial 505 seconds (phase 1) and weighting the results to form the FTP-75 cycle. This cycle has formed the basis of US emissions and fuel economy testing since 1975.

== Description of the FTP-75 ==
The "city" driving program of the EPA Federal Test Procedure consists of the UDDS cycle, plus the first phase of an additional UDDS cycle. The FTP-75 is started "cold" (meaning the engine is at ambient temperature). The two phases of a UDDS are run, followed by a "warm soak" of approximately 10 minutes, where the vehicle is keyed off. Finally, a third phase (the "warm start") is run, consisting of the first phase of the UDDS.

The final cycle runs for 1874 seconds of running time (not counting the soak) over a length of 11.04 miles (17.77 km) for an average speed of 21.2 miles per hour (34.1 km/h).

Emissions are captured during the test and the values in grams/mile calculated for each phase. To calculate a final emissions number, the emissions from phase 1 (the cold start transient) and phase 3 (the hot start transient) are combined with a weighting factor of 0.43 for the cold start phase and 0.57 for the hot start phase. These are then combined with phase 2 emissions (weighted naturally by distance) to produce a final value.

In certain applications, notably for hybrid vehicles, the FTP-75 is run as a four-phase test, consisting of two full UDDS cycles run sequentially, separated by a warm soak. In this case, the emissions from phases 2 and 4 are combined using the same 0.43/0.57 weighting as used for phases 1 and 3.

== Temperature ==
The first applications of the FTP-75 were run at a nominal ambient temperature of 75 °F (24 °C). Later standards for carbon monoxide (CO) required testing at a cold temperature of 20 °F (−7 °C). In 2008, the cold FTP test was added to the tests used to determine vehicle fuel economy as part of the five-cycle test.

== Electric vehicles ==
Though it was originally created as a reference point for fossil-fueled vehicles, the UDDS and thus the FTP-75, are also used to estimate the range in distance travelled by an electric vehicle in a single charge.

== Deceptions ==
It is alleged that, similarly than in the NEDC, some automakers overinflate tyres, adjusting or disconnecting brakes to reduce friction, and taping cracks between body panels and windows to reduce air resistance, some go as far as removing wing mirrors, to inflate measured fuel economy and lower measured carbon emission.

In addition, it has been brought to attention that the relative height of the simulated wind fan with respect to the vehicle could alter the performance of aftertreatment systems due to changes in temperature and, consequently, modify the pollutant emissions values.

== EPA fuel economy sticker ==
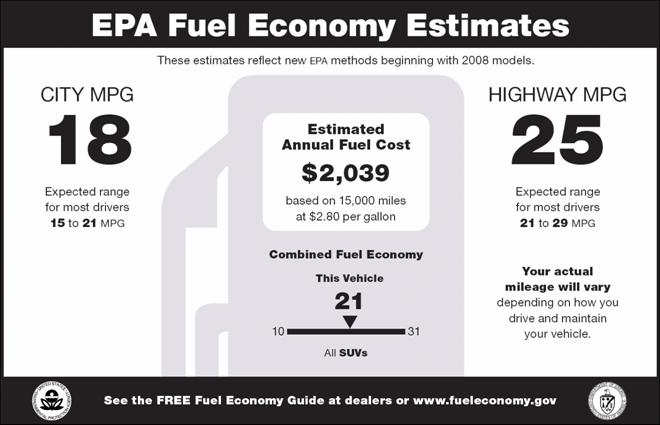
2008 Monroney sticker highlights fuel economy.

EPA tests for fuel economy do not include electrical load tests beyond climate control, which may account for some of the discrepancy between EPA and real world fuel-efficiency. A 200 W electrical load can produce a 0.94 mpg (0.4 km/L) reduction in efficiency on the FTP 75 cycle test.

== See also ==
- New European Driving Cycle
- Worldwide Harmonised Light Vehicles Test Procedure
- China Light-Duty Vehicle Test Cycle
- United States vehicle emission standards
- Fuel economy in automobiles
- National Vehicle Fuel and Emissions Laboratory (NVFEL)
