= 2024 term United States Supreme Court opinions of Clarence Thomas =

The 2024 term of the Supreme Court of the United States began October 7, 2024, and will conclude October, 2025. This is the thirty-fourth term of Associate Justice Clarence Thomas's tenure on the Court.
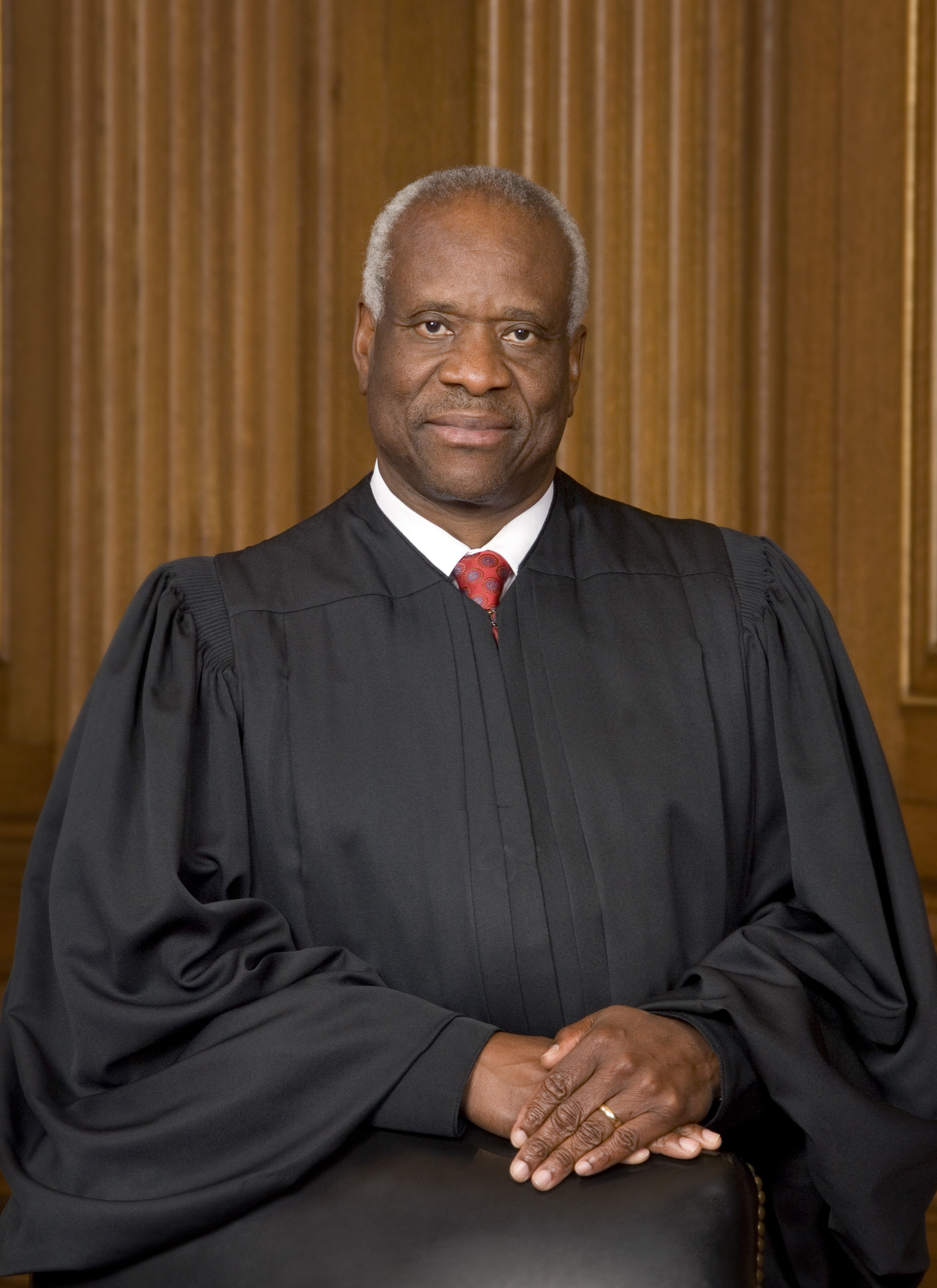

Clarence Thomas 2024 term statistics (in progress)

2	Majority or plurality	1	Concurrence	1	Other
9	Dissent	0	Concurrence/dissent	Total =	13
Bench opinions = 6		Opinions relating to orders = 7		In-chambers opinions = 0
Unanimous opinions: 0		Most joined by: Alito (6 in full, 2 in part)		Least joined by: -

Type	Case	Citation	Issues	Joined by	Other opinions
	Wilson v. Hawaii	604 U.S. ___ (2024)		Alito	Gorsuch
Thomas filed a statement respecting the Court's denial of certiorari.
	Andrew v. White	604 U.S. ___ (2025)		Gorsuch	per curiam; Alito
	Davis v. Smith	604 U.S. ___ (2025)		Alito	
Thomas dissented from the Court's denial of certiorari.
	Wisconsin Bell, Inc. v. United States ex rel. Heath	604 U.S. ___ (2025)		Kavanaugh; Alito (in part)	Kagan; Kavanaugh
	Williams v. Reed	604 U.S. ___ (2025)		Alito, Gorsuch, Barrett (in part)	Kavanaugh
	Carter v. United States	604 U.S. ___ (2025)			
Thomas dissented from the Court's denial of certiorari.
	Coalition Life v. Carbondale	604 U.S. ___ (2025)			
Thomas dissented from the Court's denial of certiorari.
	Glossip v. Oklahoma	604 U.S. ___ (2025)		Alito; Barrett (in part)	Sotomayor; Barrett
	Speech First, Inc. v. Whitten	604 U.S. ___ (2025)			
Thomas dissented from the Court's denial of certiorari.
	Bufkin v. Collins	604 U.S. ___ (2025)		Roberts, Alito, Sotomayor, Kagan, Kavanaugh, Barrett	Jackson
	Alabama v. California	604 U.S. ___ (2025)		Alito	
	Hittle v. City of Stockton	604 U.S. ___ (2025)		Gorsuch	
Thomas dissented from the Court's denial of certiorari.
	Delligatti v. United States	604 U.S. ___ (2025)		Roberts, Alito, Sotomayor, Kagan, Kavanaugh, Barrett	Gorsuch
