= 2024 term United States Supreme Court opinions of Ketanji Brown Jackson =

The 2024 term of the Supreme Court of the United States began October 7, 2024, and concluded October 5, 2025. This was the third term of Associate Justice Ketanji Brown Jackson's tenure on the Court.
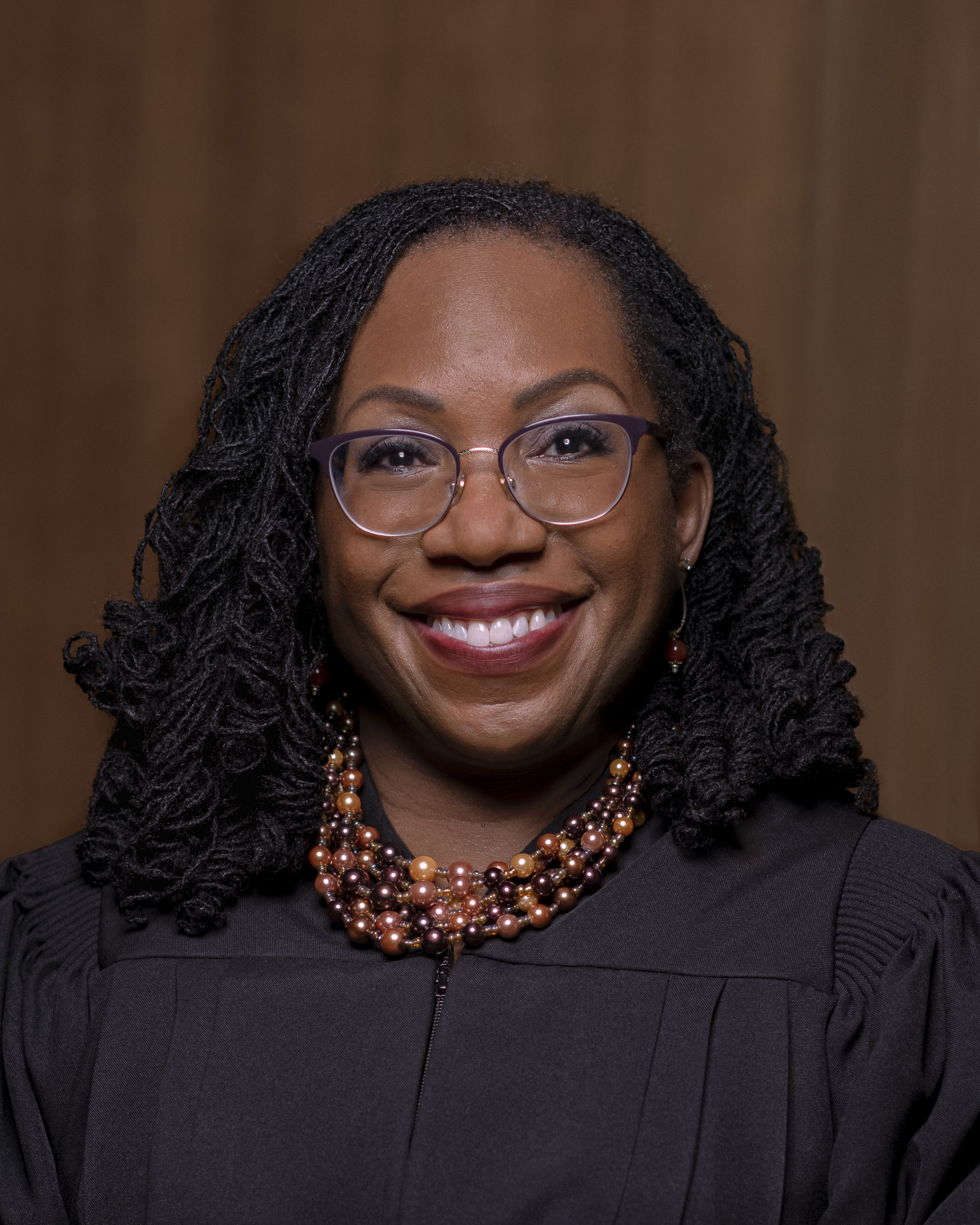

Ketanji Brown Jackson 2024 term statistics

1	Majority or plurality	1	Concurrence	0	Other
4	Dissent	0	Concurrence/dissent	Total =	6
Bench opinions = 4		Opinions relating to orders = 2		In-chambers opinions = 0
Unanimous opinions: 1		Most joined by: -		Least joined by: -

Type	Case	Citation	Issues	Joined by	Other opinions
	Horseracing Integrity and Safety Authority, Inc. v. National Horsemen's Benevolent and Protective Association	604 U.S. ___ (2024)			
Jackson dissented from the Court's grant of application for stay.
	Bouarfa v. Mayorkas	604 U.S. ___ (2024)		Unanimous	
	McHenry v. Texas Top Cop Shop, Inc.	604 U.S. ___ (2025)			Gorsuch
Jackson dissented from the Court's grant of application for stay.
	Lackey v. Stinnie	604 U.S. ___ (2025)		Sotomayor	Roberts
	Bufkin v. Collins	604 U.S. ___ (2025)		Gorsuch	Thomas
	Thompson v. United States	604 U.S. ___ (2025)			Roberts; Alito
