= 2024 term United States Supreme Court opinions of Samuel Alito =

The 2024 term of the Supreme Court of the United States began October 7, 2024, and concluded October 5, 2025. This was the twentieth term of Associate Justice Samuel Alito's tenure on the Court.
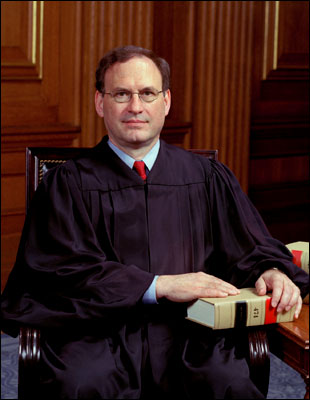

Samuel Alito 2024 term statistics

2	Majority or plurality	2	Concurrence	1	Other
4	Dissent	0	Concurrence/dissent	Total =	9
Bench opinions = 5		Opinions relating to orders = 4		In-chambers opinions = 0
Unanimous opinions: 1		Most joined by: Thomas (7)		Least joined by: -

Type	Case	Citation	Issues	Joined by	Other opinions
	Republican National Committee v. Genser	604 U.S. ___ (2024)		Thomas, Gorsuch	
Alito filed a statement respecting the Court's denial of application for stay.
	Parents Protecting Our Children, UA v. Eau Claire Area School District	604 U.S. ___ (2024)		Thomas	
Alito dissented from the Court's denial of certiorari.
	Boston Parent Coalition for Academic Excellence Corp. v. The School Committee for the City of Boston	604 U.S. ___ (2024)		Thomas	Gorsuch
Alito dissented from the Court's denial of certiorari.
	Andrew v. White	604 U.S. ___ (2024)			per curiam; Thomas
	Pina v. Estate of Dominguez	604 U.S. ___ (2025)		Thomas	
Alito dissented from the Court's denial of certiorari.
	Waetzig v. Halliburton Energy Services, Inc.	604 U.S. ___ (2025)		Unanimous	
	City and County of San Francisco v. EPA	604 U.S. ___ (2025)		Roberts, Thomas, Kavanaugh; Sotomayor, Kagan, Gorsuch, Barrett, Jackson (in part)	Barrett
	Department of State v. AIDS Vaccine Advocacy Coalition	604 U.S. ___ (2025)		Thomas, Gorsuch, Kavanaugh	
	Thompson v. United States	604 U.S. ___ (2025)			Roberts; Jackson
