= 2024 term United States Supreme Court opinions of Brett Kavanaugh =

The 2024 term of the Supreme Court of the United States began October 7, 2024, and will conclude October, 2025. This is the seventh term of Associate Justice Brett Kavanaugh's tenure on the Court.
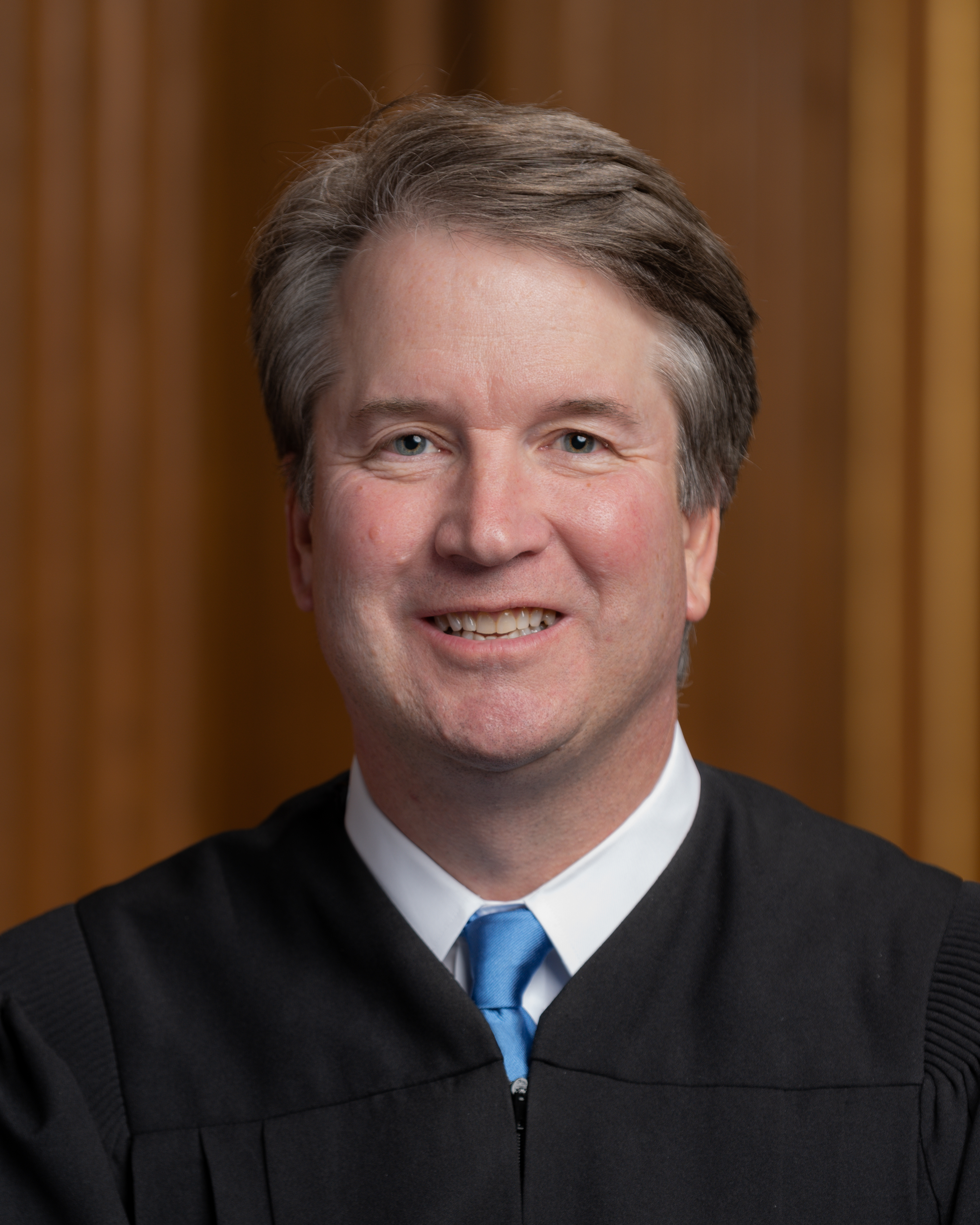

Brett Kavanaugh 2024 term statistics (in progress)

2	Majority or plurality	1	Concurrence	1	Other
0	Dissent	0	Concurrence/dissent	Total =	4
Bench opinions = 3		Opinions relating to orders = 1		In-chambers opinions = 0
Unanimous opinions: 0		Most joined by: -		Least joined by: -

Type	Case	Citation	Issues	Joined by	Other opinions
	West Virginia v. EPA	604 U.S. ___ (2024)		Gorsuch	
	E.M.D. Sales, Inc. v. Carrera	604 U.S. ___ (2025)		Unanimous	Gorsuch
	Wisconsin Bell, Inc. v. United States ex rel. Heath	604 U.S. ___ (2025)		Thomas	Kagan; Thomas
	Williams v. Reed	604 U.S. ___ (2025)		Roberts, Sotomayor, Kagan, Jackson	Thomas
