= 2024 term United States Supreme Court opinions of Elena Kagan =

The 2024 term of the Supreme Court of the United States began October 7, 2024, and will conclude October, 2025. This is the fifteenth term of Associate Justice Elena Kagan's tenure on the Court.
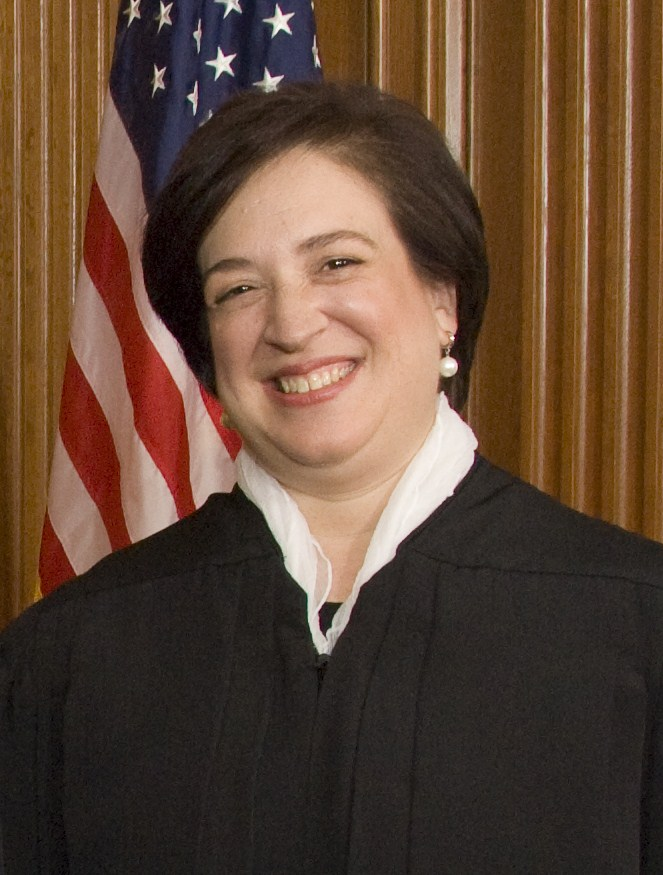

Elena Kagan 2024 term statistics (in progress)

3	Majority or plurality	0	Concurrence	0	Other
0	Dissent	0	Concurrence/dissent	Total =	3
Bench opinions = 3		Opinions relating to orders = 0		In-chambers opinions = 0
Unanimous opinions: 3		Most joined by: -		Least joined by: -

Type	Case	Citation	Issues	Joined by	Other opinions
	Royal Canin U. S. A., Inc. v. Wullschleger	604 U.S. ___ (2025)		Unanimous	
	Wisconsin Bell, Inc. v. United States ex rel. Heath	604 U.S. ___ (2025)		Unanimous	Thomas; Kavanaugh
	Dewberry Group, Inc. v. Dewberry Engineers Inc.	604 U.S. ___ (2025)		Unanimous	Sotomayor
