= 2024 term United States Supreme Court opinions of Neil Gorsuch =

Views of Justice Neil Gorsuch in 2023

The 2024 term of the Supreme Court of the United States began October 7, 2024, and concluded October 2025. This was the ninth term of Associate Justice Neil Gorsuch's tenure on the Court.
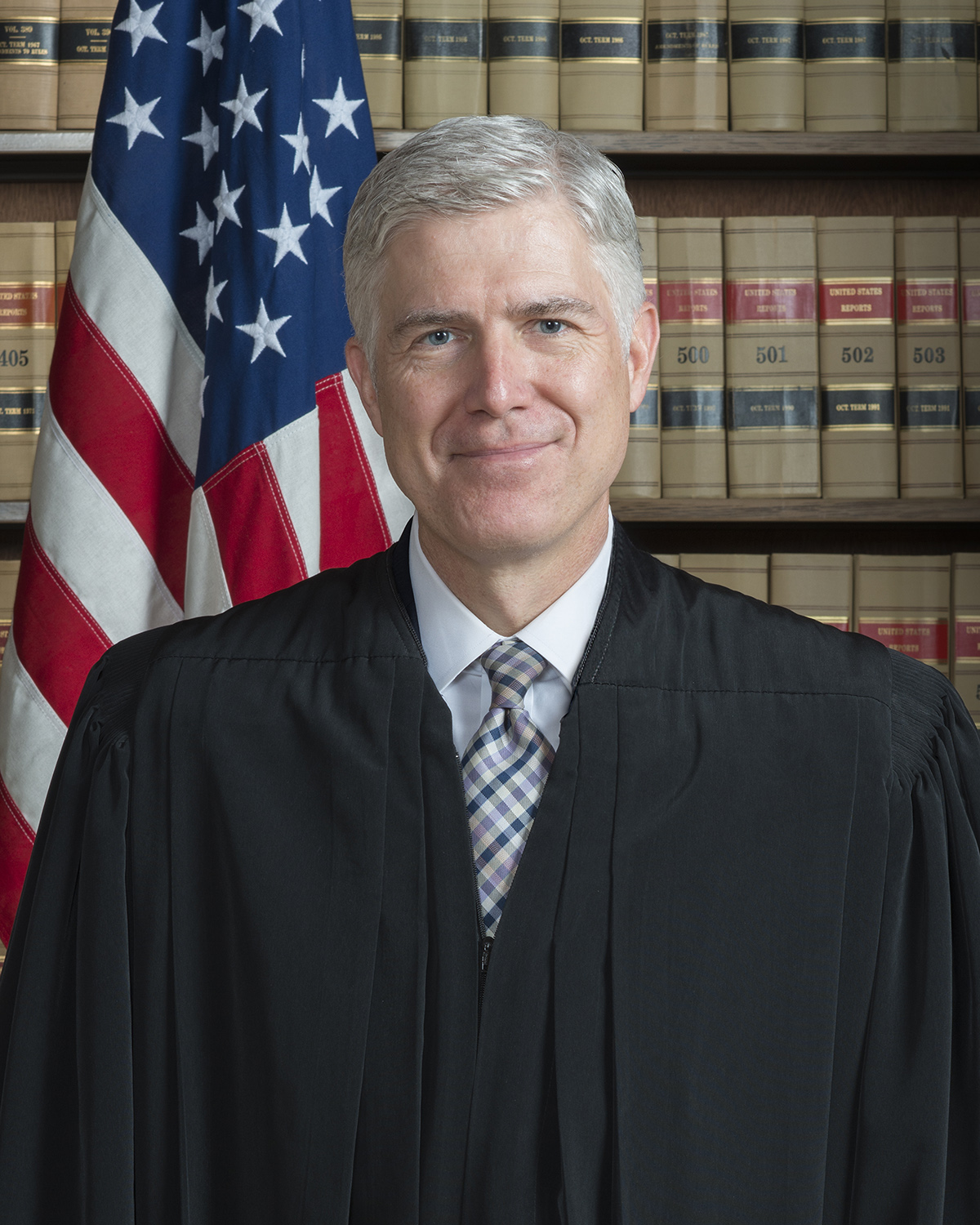

Neil Gorsuch 2024 term statistics

| 0 | Majority or plurality | 3 | Concurrence | 2 | Other |
| 4 | Dissent | 0 | Concurrence/dissent | Total = | 9 |
| Bench opinions = 3 | | Opinions relating to orders = 6 | | In-chambers opinions = 0 |
| Unanimous opinions: 0 | | Most joined by: - | | Least joined by: - |

| Type | Case | Citation | Issues | Joined by | Other opinions |
|---|---|---|---|---|---|
| | Wilson v. Hawaii | 604 U.S. ___ (2024) | | | Thomas |
Gorsuch filed a statement respecting the Court's denial of certiorari.
| | Boston Parent Coalition for Academic Excellence Corp. v. The School Committee for the City of Boston | 604 U.S. ___ (2024) | | | Alito |
Gorsuch filed a statement respecting the Court's denial of certiorari.
| | E.M.D. Sales, Inc. v. Carrera | 604 U.S. ___ (2025) | | Thomas | Kavanaugh |
| | TikTok Inc. v. Garland | 604 U.S. ___ (2025) | | | per curiam; Sotomayor |
| | McHenry v. Texas Top Cop Shop, Inc. | 604 U.S. ___ (2025) | | | Jackson |
Gorsuch concurred in the Court's grant of application for stay.
| | Bessent v. Dellinger | 604 U.S. ___ (2025) | | Alito | |
| | Rimlawi v. United States | 604 U.S. ___ (2025) | | | |
Gorsuch dissented from the Court's denial of certiorari.
| | Hoffman v. Westcott | 604 U.S. ___ (2025) | | | |
| | Delligatti v. United States | 604 U.S. ___ (2025) | | Jackson | Thomas |
