= 2024 term United States Supreme Court opinions of Sonia Sotomayor =

The 2024 term of the Supreme Court of the United States began October 7, 2024, and concluded October 5, 2025. This was the sixteenth term of Associate Justice Sonia Sotomayor's tenure on the Court.
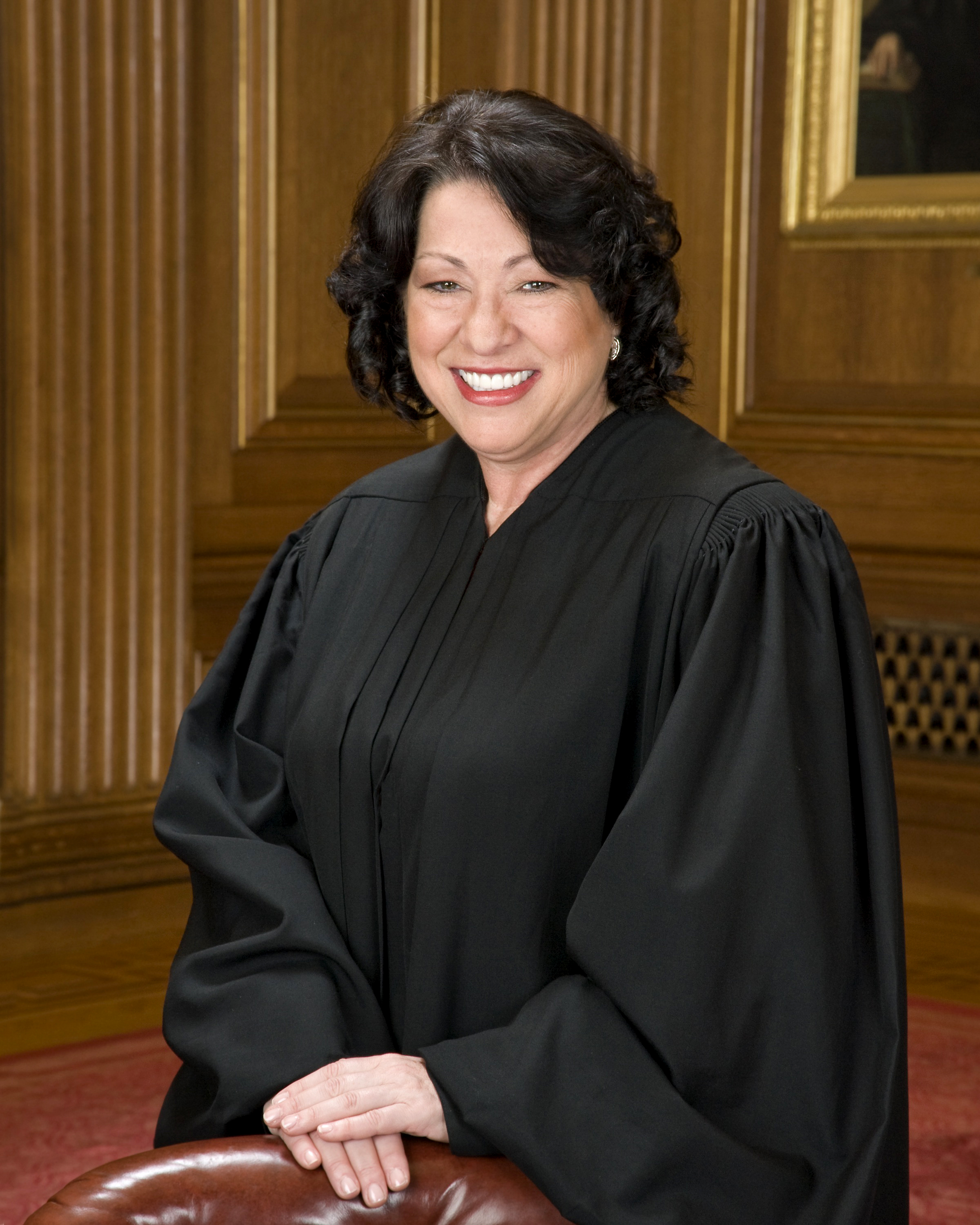

Sonia Sotomayor 2024 term statistics

1	Majority or plurality	2	Concurrence	4	Other
0	Dissent	0	Concurrence/dissent	Total =	7
Bench opinions = 3		Opinions relating to orders = 4		In-chambers opinions = 0
Unanimous opinions: 0		Most joined by: Gorsuch (2)		Least joined by: -

Type	Case	Citation	Issues	Joined by	Other opinions
	Roberson v. Texas	604 U.S. ___ (2024)			
Sotomayor filed a statement respecting the Court's denial of certiorari and application for stay of execution.
	Baker v. City of McKinney	604 U.S. ___ (2024)		Gorsuch	
Sotomayor filed a statement respecting the Court's denial of certiorari.
	TikTok Inc. v. Garland	604 U.S. ___ (2025)			per curiam; Gorsuch
	Woodward v. California	604 U.S. ___ (2025)			
Sotomayor filed a statement respecting the Court's denial of certiorari.
	Gonzalez v. United States	604 U.S. ___ (2025)		Gorsuch	
Sotomayor filed a statement respecting the Court's denial of certiorari.
	Glossip v. Oklahoma	604 U.S. ___ (2025)		Roberts, Kagan, Kavanaugh, Jackson; Barrett (in part)	Barrett; Thomas
	Dewberry Group, Inc. v. Dewberry Engineers Inc.	604 U.S. ___ (2025)			Kagan
