= 2024 term United States Supreme Court opinions of John Roberts =

The 2024 term of the Supreme Court of the United States began October 7, 2024, and will conclude October, 2025. This is the twentieth term of Chief Justice John Roberts's tenure on the Court.
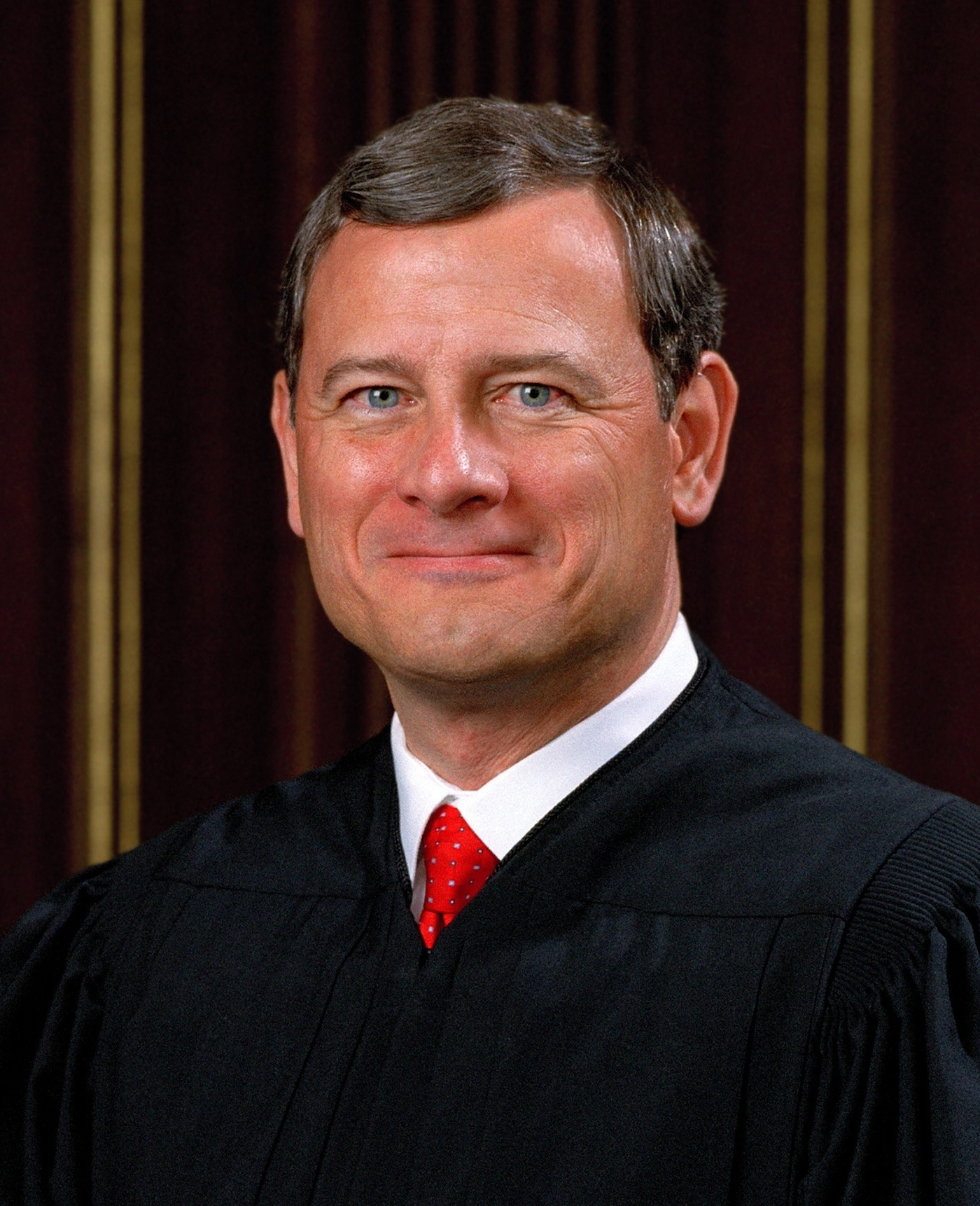

John Roberts 2024 term statistics (in progress)

2	Majority or plurality	0	Concurrence	0	Other
0	Dissent	0	Concurrence/dissent	Total =	2
Bench opinions = 2		Opinions relating to orders = 0		In-chambers opinions = 0
Unanimous opinions: 1		Most joined by: -		Least joined by: -

Type	Case	Citation	Issues	Joined by	Other opinions
	Lackey v. Stinnie	604 U.S. ___ (2025)		Thomas, Alito, Kagan, Gorsuch, Kavanaugh, Barrett	Jackson
	Thompson v. United States	604 U.S. ___ (2025)		Unanimous	Alito; Jackson
