= 2024 term United States Supreme Court opinions of Amy Coney Barrett =

The 2024 term of the Supreme Court of the United States began October 7, 2024, and will conclude October, 2025. This is the fifth term of Associate Justice Amy Coney Barrett's tenure on the Court.
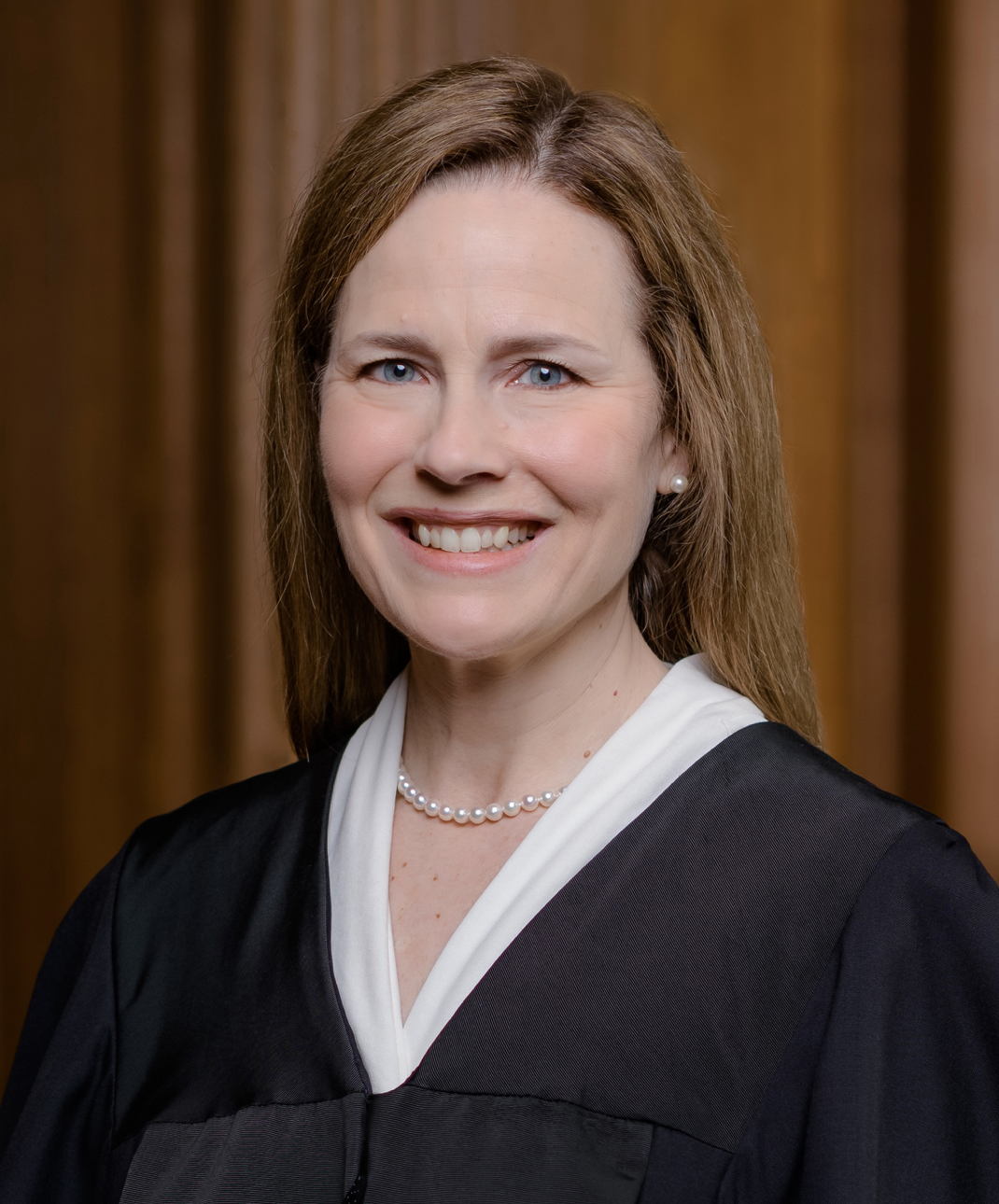

Amy Coney Barrett 2024 term statistics (in progress)

0	Majority or plurality	0	Concurrence	0	Other
1	Dissent	1	Concurrence/dissent	Total =	2
Bench opinions = 2		Opinions relating to orders = 0		In-chambers opinions = 0
Unanimous opinions: 0		Most joined by: -		Least joined by: -

Type	Case	Citation	Issues	Joined by	Other opinions
	Glossip v. Oklahoma	604 U.S. ___ (2025)			Sotomayor; Thomas
	City and County of San Francisco v. EPA	604 U.S. ___ (2025)		Sotomayor, Kagan, Jackson	Alito
