= List of United States Supreme Court cases, volume 604 =

This is a list of all the United States Supreme Court cases from volume 604 of the United States Reports:

Note: As of July 2025, final bound volumes for the U.S. Supreme Court's United States Reports have been published through volume 582 (June 2017). Newer cases from subsequent future volumes do not yet have official page numbers and typically use three underscores in place of the page number; e.g., Example v. United States, 700 U.S. ___ (2050).

Case name	Docket no.	Date decided
Hamm v. Smith	23–167	November 4, 2024
Grant, vacate, remand.
Facebook, Inc. v. Amalgamated Bank	23–411	November 22, 2024
Dismissed the writ of certiorari as improvidently granted.
Bouarfa v. Mayorkas	23–583	December 10, 2024
In §1155, Congress granted the Secretary of Homeland Security broad authority to revoke an approved visa petition "at any time, for what he deems to be good and sufficient cause." Such a revocation is thus "in the discretion of" the agency under §1252(a)(2)(B)(ii). Thus, where §1252(a)(2)(B)(ii) applies, it bars judicial review of the Secretary’s revocation under §1155.
NVIDIA Corp. v. E. Ohman J:or Fonder AB	23–970	December 11, 2024
Dismissed the writ of certiorari as improvidently granted.
E.M.D. Sales, Inc. v. Carrera	23–217	January 15, 2025
A preponderance-of-the-evidence standard applies when an employer seeks to show that an employee is exempt from the minimum-wage and overtime pay provisions of the Fair Labor Standards Act.
Royal Canin U. S. A., Inc. v. Wullschleger	23–677	January 15, 2025
After a deletion of all federal claims deprived the District Court of federal-question jurisdiction, the suit became one for a state court.
TikTok v. Garland	24–656	January 17, 2025
The Protecting Americans from Foreign Adversary Controlled Applications Act did not infringe on the First Amendment right of TikTok users and ByteDance.
Andrew v. White	23–6573	January 21, 2025
The Due Process Clause forbids the introduction of evidence so unduly prejudicial as to render a criminal trial fundamentally unfair.
Republic of Hungary v. Simon	23–867	February 21, 2025
Alleging commingling of funds alone cannot satisfy the commercial nexus requirement of the FSIA's expropriation exception.
Wisconsin Bell, Inc. v. United States ex rel. Heath	23–1127	February 21, 2025
Entities violate the False Claims Act of 1863 when they make fraudulent representations to private administrators of government programs if the disbursed funds at least partially came from the government.
Williams v. Reed	23–191	February 21, 2025
Where a state court's application of a state exhaustion requirement in effect immunizes state officials from § 1983 claims challenging delays in the administrative process, state courts may not deny those § 1983 claims on failure-to-exhaust grounds.
Lackey v. Stinnie	23–621	February 25, 2025
Parties that secure a preliminary injunction have not "prevailed" for the purposes of recovering attorneys' fees, even if their case was mooted by the challenged law's repeal.
Glossip v. Oklahoma	22–7466	February 25, 2025
1. This Court has jurisdiction to review the OCCA’s judgment.; 2. The prosecution violated its constitutional obligation to correct false testimony.
Waetzig v. Halliburton Energy Services, Inc.	23–971	February 26, 2025
Rule 60(b) of the Federal Rules of Civil Procedure empowers federal courts to reverse voluntary dismissals when based on a mistake, among other reasons.
Dewberry Group, Inc. v. Dewberry Engineers Inc.	23–900	February 26, 2025
Lanham Act awards of a "defendant's profits" in trademark infringement cases do not extend to the profits of the defendant's corporate affiliates.
City and County of San Francisco v. EPA	23–753	March 4, 2025
Section 1311(b)(1)(C) does not authorize the EPA to include “end-result” provisions in NPDES permits. Determining what steps a permittee must take to ensure that water quality standards are met is the EPA’s responsibility, and Congress has given it the tools needed to make that determination. United States Court of Appeals for the Ninth Circuit reversed.
Bufkin v. Collins	23–713	March 5, 2025
the Court of Appeals for Veterans Claims must apply clear error review when reviewing the Department of Veterans Affairs's application of the "benefit-of-the-doubt rule" regarding a veteran's claim to a service-related disability.
Thompson v. United States	23–1095	March 21, 2025
A statute that prohibits knowingly making a false statement to influence the FDIC’s action on a loan does not criminalize statements that are misleading but not false.
Delligatti v. United States	23–825	March 21, 2025
A state second-degree murder charge that includes omission satisfies the federal criminal code's definition of violent crime.
Bondi v. VanDerStok	23–852	March 26, 2025
The ATF’s rule interpreting terms like "firearm" to include ghost gun kits is not facially inconsistent with the Gun Control Act of 1968.
United States v. Miller	23–824	March 26, 2025
The Bankruptcy Code's waiver of sovereign immunity does not entitle a bankruptcy trustee to recover a debtor's fraudulent federal tax payments.

== See also ==
- List of United States Supreme Court cases by the Roberts Court
- 2024 term opinions of the Supreme Court of the United States
