= Dunlop v. Bachowski =

- Supreme Court of the United States

Argued April 21, 1975 Decided June 2, 1975
- Full case name: John Thomas Dunlop, Secretary of Labor v. Bachowski, et al.
- Citations: 421 U.S. 560 (more) 95 S. Ct. 1851; 44 L. Ed. 2d 377; 1975 U.S. LEXIS 140; 77 Lab. Cas. (CCH) ¶ 10,872; 89 L.R.R.M. 2435

Court membership
- Chief Justice Warren E. Burger Associate Justices William O. Douglas · William J. Brennan Jr. Potter Stewart · Byron White; Thurgood Marshall · Harry Blackmun; Lewis F. Powell Jr. · William Rehnquist

Case opinions
- Majority: Brennan, joined by Burger, Douglas, Stewart, White, Marshall, Blackmun, Powell
- Concurrence: Burger
- Concur/dissent: Rehnquist

Dunlop v. Bachowski, 421 U.S. 560 (1975), is a unanimous decision of the Supreme Court of the United States which held that the Labor-Management Reporting and Disclosure Act of 1959 gives federal courts jurisdiction to review decisions of the United States Department of Labor to proceed (or not) with prosecutions under the Act. In this case, there was a disputed election within the United Steelworkers. The Court declined to authorize a jury-type trial into the reasons for the department's decisions, and instead held that court may only review the department's rationales under the "arbitrary and capricious" test.
