= Civil Rights Attorney's Fees Award Act of 1976 =

- Enacted by: the 94th United States Congress

Citations
- Public law: Pub. L. 94–559
- Statutes at Large: 90 Stat. 2641

Codification
- U.S.C. sections amended: 42 U.S.C. § 1988

Legislative history
- Introduced in the Senate by John V. Tunney (D‑CA) on August 1, 1975; Committee consideration by Senate and House Committees on the Judiciary; Passed the Senate on September 29, 1976 (57-15); Passed the House of Representatives on October 1, 1976 (306-68); Signed into law by President Gerald Ford on October 19, 1976

United States Supreme Court cases
- Hanrahan v. Hampton, 446 U.S. 754 (1980); Hensley v. Eckerhart, 461 U.S. 424 (1983); City of Riverside v. Rivera, 477 U.S. 561 (1986); Rhodes v. Stewart, 488 U.S. 1 (1988); Blanchard v. Bergeron, 489 U.S. 87 (1989); Texas St. Teach. Ass'n v. Garland ISD, 489 U.S. 782 (1989); Farrar v. Hobby, 506 U.S. 103 (1992); Buckhannon Board & Care Home, Inc. v. West Virginia Dept. of Health and Human Resources, 532 U.S. 598 (2001); Sole v. Wyner, 551 U.S. 74 (2007); Lackey v. Stinnie, 604 U.S. 23-621 (2025)

The Civil Rights Attorney's Fees Award Act of 1976 is a law of the United States codified in 42 U.S.C. § 1988(b). Often referred to as "Section 1988," this law allows a federal court to award reasonable attorney's fees to a prevailing party in certain civil rights cases. The Act was designed to create an enforcement mechanism for the nation's civil rights laws without creating an enforcement bureaucracy, because the prospect of being awarded attorneys' fees is thought to incentivize attorneys to bring civil rights cases on behalf of plaintiffs.

== Text ==
The text of 42 U.S.C. § 1988(b) are as follows:

"(b) Attorney’s fees In any action or proceeding to enforce a provision of sections 1981, 1981a, 1982, 1983, 1985, and 1986 of this title, title IX of Public Law 92–318, the Religious Freedom Restoration Act of 1993, the Religious Land Use and Institutionalized Persons Act of 2000, title VI of the Civil Rights Act of 1964, or section 12361 of title 34, the court, in its discretion, may allow the prevailing party, other than the United States, a reasonable attorney’s fee as part of the costs, except that in any action brought against a judicial officer for an act or omission taken in such officer’s judicial capacity such officer shall not be held liable for any costs, including attorney’s fees, unless such action was clearly in excess of such officer’s jurisdiction."

== History ==
Congress enacted the Civil Rights Attorney's Fees Awards Act of 1976 in response to the Supreme Court decision in Alyeska Pipeline Service Co. v. Wilderness Society, 421 U.S. 240 (1975). There, the Court reaffirmed the “American Rule” that each party to a lawsuit should ordinarily bear its own attorney's fees.

Congress decided to enact this Act to guarantee the availability of attorney's fees awards by statute because the cost of litigating a constitutional claim may be prohibitive for plaintiffs, especially since those who are most likely to bring suit for a constitutional violation are individuals or groups of individuals with more modest means. Even prior to enactment of the Act, courts have recognized the need to award attorney's fees where plaintiffs perform the services of a “private attorney general” by bringing cases the resolution of which might impact more than just the individual plaintiff.

== Scope of statute ==
Two elements of the statute have been subject to the interpretation of the Supreme Court: who qualifies as a “prevailing party,” and how courts should calculate “reasonable attorney’s fees.”

=== Prevailing party ===
The Supreme Court has interpreted Section 1988(b) to apply in different ways to prevailing plaintiffs and prevailing defendants. Prevailing plaintiffs ordinarily should receive an attorney's fee award unless the award would be unjust. On the other hand, a prevailing defendant is only awarded fees if the litigation is unreasonable, frivolous, or meritless.

The Supreme Court has also clarified in Buckhannon Board & Care Home, Inc. v. West Virginia Dept. of Health and Human Resources (2001) that to prevail means to obtain a judicial decree on the merits of the case. This means that in order to be eligible for attorney's fees, there must be a court-ordered change in the legal case, or something in the court records that determines a winner. Lackey v. Stinnie (2025) further clarified that a preliminary injunction does not qualify as a judicial decree, even when the case is mooted by the challenged law's repeal, because it does not involve a full merits analysis.

=== Reasonable attorney's fees ===
While the law itself does not explain what is a reasonable fee, both the House and Senate Reports accompanying the Act expressly endorse the analysis set forth in the case Johnson Highway Express, Inc.

Johnson Highway Express, Inc. identifies 12 factors to be considered in calculating a reasonable attorney's fee:

1. the time and labor required;
2. the novelty and difficulty of the question
3. the skill required to perform the legal services properly;
4. the preclusion of other employment by the attorney due to acceptance of the case;
5. the customary fee;
6. whether the fee is fixed or contingent;
7. time limitations imposed by the client or the circumstances;
8. the amount involved and the results obtained;
9. the experience, reputation, and ability of the attorney;
10. the "undesirability" of the case;
11. the nature and length of the professional relationship with the client; and
12. awards in similar cases.

Hensley v. Eckerhart, 461 U.S. 424 (1983), announced certain guidelines for calculating a reasonable attorney's fee under 1988(b), which involved at the basic level the number of hours reasonably expended on the case multiplied by a reasonable hourly rate. In addition, “the fee award should not be reduced simply because the plaintiff failed to prevail on every contention raised in the lawsuit.”

City of Riverside v. Rivera, 477 U.S. 561 (1986), affirmed that the amount of damages a plaintiff recovers is certainly relevant to the amount of attorney's fees to be awarded under 1988. It is, however, only one of many factors that a court should consider in calculating an award of attorney's fees. The court rejected the proposition that fee awards under 1988(b) should necessarily be proportionate the amount of damages a civil rights plaintiff actually recovers.

The Senate explicitly considered the possibility of a case where there are little or no damages and said that the attorney's fees awarded should “not be reduced because the rights involved may be nonpecuniary in nature.”

== Amendments and legislative challenges ==
The House of Representatives passed a bill entitled the " Veterans' Memorials, Boy Scouts, Public Seals, and Other Public Expressions of Religion Protection Act of 2006" on September 26, 2006. The corresponding Senate Bill was introduced on July 20, 2006 but did not pass. Were this bill to become law, it would amend Section 1988 to disallow the awarding of attorneys' fees to prevailing parties in Establishment Clause cases, “including violations relating to: (1) religious words or imagery in veterans' memorials, public buildings, or official seals of states or their subdivisions; and (2) the chartering of Boy Scout units by states or their subdivisions and the Boy Scouts' using public buildings.”

42 U.S.C. § 1988(b) has been amended a number of times. The latest amendment passed as Public Law 106-274 on September 22, 2000, and in relevant part added the Religious Land Use and Institutionalized Persons Act of 2000 as an applicable statute under which the attorney's fees provision applies.
