= Buckhannon Board & Care Home, Inc. v. West Virginia Department of Health and Human Resources =

- Supreme Court of the United States

Decided May 29, 2001
- Full case name: Buckhannon Board and Care Home, Incorporated v. West Virginia Department of Health and Human
- Citations: 532 U.S. 598 (more)

Holding
- An award of attorneys fee to a "prevailing party" must be to a party that has received a judgment on the merits or a court-ordered consent decree.

Court membership
- Chief Justice William Rehnquist Associate Justices John P. Stevens · Sandra Day O'Connor; Antonin Scalia · Anthony Kennedy; David Souter · Clarence Thomas; Ruth Bader Ginsburg · Stephen Breyer

Case opinions
- Majority: Rehnquist, joined by O’Connor, Scalia, Kennedy, Thomas
- Concurrence: Scalia, joined by Thomas
- Dissent: Ginsburg, joined by Stevens, Souter, Breyer

Laws applied
- Civil Rights Attorney's Fees Award Act of 1976

Buckhannon Board & Care Home, Inc. v. West Virginia Department of Health and Human Resources, 532 U.S. 598 (2001), was a United States Supreme Court case in which the Court held that an award of attorney's fee to a "prevailing party" under the Civil Rights Attorney's Fees Award Act of 1976 must be to a party that has received a judgment on the merits or a court-ordered consent decree.

== Legacy ==
In Lackey v. Stinnie (2025), the Supreme Court heavily relied on this case in holding that a preliminary injunction does not entitle the litigants to recoup their attorney's fees, even when the case is mooted by the challenged law's repeal, because it does not involve a full merits analysis.

== See also ==
- Hardt v. Reliance Standard Life Insurance Co.
