= List of United States Supreme Court cases, volume 421 =

This is a list of all the United States Supreme Court cases from volume 421 of the United States Reports:

Case name	Citation	Date decided
Vella v. Ford Motor Co.	421 U.S. 1	1975
Stanton v. Stanton	421 U.S. 7	1975
McLucas v. DeChamplain	421 U.S. 21	1975
Withrow v. Larkin	421 U.S. 35	1975
Train v. Nat. Resources Defense Council, Inc.	421 U.S. 60	1975
Colonial Pipeline Co. v. Traigle	421 U.S. 100	1975
Kugler v. Helfant	421 U.S. 117	1975
NLRB v. Sears, Roebuck & Co.	421 U.S. 132	1975
Renegotiation Bd. v. Grumman Aircraft Eng'g Corp.	421 U.S. 168	1975
Costarelli v. Massachusetts	421 U.S. 193	1975
Gurley v. Rhoden	421 U.S. 200	1975
Johnson v. Mississippi	421 U.S. 213	1975
Alyeska Pipeline Service Company v. Wilderness Society	421 U.S. 240	1975
Hill v. Stone	421 U.S. 289	1975
United States v. Wilson (1975)	421 U.S. 309	1975
Phelps v. United States	421 U.S. 330	1975
Van Lare v. Hurley	421 U.S. 338	1975
Meek v. Pittenger	421 U.S. 349	1975
United States v. Reliable Transfer Co.	421 U.S. 397	1975
Sec. Investor Protection Corp. v. Barbour	421 U.S. 412	1975
Ellis v. Dyson	421 U.S. 426	1975
Johnson v. Ry. Express Agency, Inc.	421 U.S. 454	1975
Dallas Cnty. v. Reese	421 U.S. 477	1975
Pitchess v. Davis	421 U.S. 482	1975
Eastland v. U.S. Servicemen's Fund	421 U.S. 491	1975
Breed v. Jones	421 U.S. 519	1975
Fry v. United States	421 U.S. 542	1975
Dunlop v. Bachowski	421 U.S. 560	1975
United States v. Tax Comm'n	421 U.S. 599	1975
Connell Constr. Co. v. Plumbers	421 U.S. 616	1975
Connor v. Waller	421 U.S. 656	1975
United States v. Park	421 U.S. 658	1975
Mullaney v. Wilbur	421 U.S. 684	1975
Philbrook v. Glodgett	421 U.S. 707	1975
Blue Chip Stamps v. Manor Drug Stores	421 U.S. 723	1975
Edwards v. Healy	421 U.S. 772	1975
Goldfarb v. Virginia State Bar	421 U.S. 773	1975
Murphy v. Florida	421 U.S. 794	1975
Bigelow v. Virginia	421 U.S. 809	1975
United Housing Foundation, Inc. v. Forman	421 U.S. 837	1975
