= Train v. Natural Resources Defense Council, Inc. =

Train v. Natural Resources Defense Council
- Supreme Court of the United States

Decided April 16, 1975
- Full case name: Train v. Natural Resources Defense Council
- Citations: 421 U.S. 60 (more)

Holding
- The EPA must approve a State Implementation Plan if it meets the requisite criteria under the Clean Air Act.

Court membership
- Chief Justice Warren E. Burger Associate Justices William O. Douglas · William J. Brennan Jr. Potter Stewart · Byron White; Thurgood Marshall · Harry Blackmun; Lewis F. Powell Jr. · William Rehnquist

Train v. Natural Resources Defense Council, 421 U.S. 60 (1975), is a United States Supreme Court case in which the Court held that the EPA must approve a State Implementation Plan if it meets the criteria under the Clean Air Act.

== Facts ==
The 1970 amendments to the Clean Air Act required states to meet federally mandated air quality standards within a statutorily specified period of time. States were directed to submit to the Administrator of the EPA a plan to "implement, attain and maintain" the federally adopted standards within nine months of the promulgation of such standards. The EPA Administrator was required to approve implementation plans meeting the statutory criteria and to promulgate substitutes for those found deficient. A number of states included variance procedures in their implementation plans, which the EPA approved. The NRDC challenged the EPA's approval of Georgia's implementation plan on the grounds that the postponement provision of the Clean Air Act was the only method to modify the state implementation plans. The Fifth Circuit Court of Appeals held that the Georgia plan should not have been approved, and the Supreme Court granted certiorari.

== Opinion ==
In an opinion delivered by Justice Rehnquist, the Court concluded that the Fifth Circuit erred in holding that postponements were the exclusive means by which individual sources could obtain relief from state implementation plans. The Court held that the Fifth Circuit had improperly substituted their judgment for the agency's judgment, and the flexibility in the language of the Clean Air Act left the states with the requisite authority to grant source-specific variances. The Court further held that as long as the "ultimate effect of a State's choice of emission limitations is compliance with the national standards for ambient air," a state is "at liberty to adopt whatever mix of emission limitations it deems best suited to its particular situation."
