= SEC v. W. J. Howey Co. =

Securities and Exchange Commission v. W. J. Howey Co.
- Supreme Court of the United States

Argued May 2, 1946 Decided May 27, 1946
- Full case name: Securities and Exchange Commission v. W. J. Howey Co. et al.
- Citations: 328 U.S. 293 (more) 66 S. Ct. 1100; 90 L. Ed. 1244; 1946 U.S. LEXIS 3159; 163 A.L.R. 1043

Case history
- Prior: Injunction denied, 60 F. Supp. 440 (S.D. Fla. 1945); affirmed, 151 F.2d 714 (5th Cir. 1945); certiorari granted, 327 U.S. 773 (1946).
- Subsequent: Rehearing Denied October 14, 1946

Holding
- An investment contract for purposes of the Securities Act means a contract, transaction or scheme whereby a person invests his money in a common enterprise and is led to expect profits solely from the efforts of the promoter or a third party, it being immaterial whether the shares in the enterprise are evidenced by formal certificates or by nominal interests in the physical assets employed in the enterprise.

Court membership
- Chief Justice vacant Associate Justices Hugo Black · Stanley F. Reed; Felix Frankfurter · William O. Douglas; Frank Murphy · Robert H. Jackson; Wiley B. Rutledge · Harold H. Burton

Case opinions
- Majority: Murphy, joined by Black, Reed, Douglas, Burton, Rutledge
- Dissent: Frankfurter
- Jackson took no part in the consideration or decision of the case.

Laws applied
- Securities Act of 1933

Securities and Exchange Commission v. W. J. Howey Co., 328 U.S. 293 (1946), was a case in which the Supreme Court of the United States held that the offer of a land sales and service contract was an "investment contract" within the meaning of the Securities Act of 1933 (15 U.S.C. § 77b) and that the use of the mails and interstate commerce in the offer and sale of these securities was a violation of §5 of the Act, 15 U.S.C. § 77e. It was an important case in determining the general applicability of the federal securities laws.

The case resulted in a test, known as the Howey test, to determine whether an instrument qualifies as an "investment contract" for the purposes of the Securities Act: "a contract, transaction or scheme whereby a person invests his money in a common enterprise and is led to expect profits solely from the efforts of the promoter or a third party."

== Facts ==
The defendants, W. J. Howey Co. and Howey-in-the-Hills Service, Inc., were corporations organized under the laws of the state of Florida. William John Howey owned large tracts of citrus groves in Florida. Howey kept half of the groves for its own use and sold real estate contracts for the other half to finance its future developments. Howey would sell the land for a uniform price per acre (or per fraction of an acre for smaller parcels) and convey to the purchaser a warranty deed upon payment in full of the purchase price.

The purchaser of the land could then lease it back to the service company Howey-in-the-Hills, via a service contract, which would tend to the land, and harvest, pool, and market the produce. The service contract gave Howey-in-the-Hills "full and complete" possession of the land specified in the contract and left no right of entry or any right to the produce harvested. Purchasers of the land had the option of making other service arrangements, but W. J. Howey, in its advertising materials, stressed the superiority of Howey-in-the-Hills's service.

Howey marketed the land through a resort hotel it owned in the area and promised significant profits in the sales pitch it provided to those who expressed interest in the groves. Most purchasers of the land were not Florida residents or farmers. Rather, they were business and professional people inexperienced in agriculture and lacking the skill or equipment to tend to the land by themselves.

== Procedural history ==
Howey had not filed any registration statement with the Securities and Exchange Commission. The SEC filed suit to obtain an injunction forbidding the defendants from using the mails and instrumentalities of interstate commerce in the offer and the sale of unregistered and nonexempt securities, in violation of 5(a) of the Securities Act of 1933. The United States District Court for the Southern District of Florida denied the injunction, and the United States Court of Appeals for the Fifth Circuit affirmed. The US Supreme Court then granted certiorari.

== Majority opinion ==
Justice Frank Murphy, writing for the majority, identified the major legal issue in this case as whether or not the contracts that Howey was selling (which were basically leaseback agreements) constituted an "investment contract" within the meaning of § 2(a)(1) of the Securities Act of 1933. Murphy reasoned that while the term "investment contract" was left undefined by the Act, it had been used in state blue sky laws to cover a broad array of contracts and other schemes to raise capital in a way to secure some income or profit from the use thereof. Thus, the Court concluded that Congress had written the term into the statute in recognition of its previously adopted common law meaning.

Murphy then formulated one of the US Supreme Court's earliest tests to determine whether an instrument qualifies as an "investment contract" for the purposes of the Securities Act (which later came to be referred to as the Howey test):

"In other words, an investment contract for purposes of the Securities Act means a contract, transaction or scheme whereby a person invests his money in a common enterprise and is led to expect profits solely from the efforts of the promoter or a third party, it being immaterial whether the shares in the enterprise are evidenced by formal certificates or by nominal interests in the physical assets employed in the enterprise."

"The test is whether the scheme involves an investment of money in a common enterprise with profits to come solely from the efforts of others. If that test be satisfied, it is immaterial whether the enterprise is speculative or non-speculative or whether there is a sale of property with or without intrinsic value."

Murphy determined that the contracts in issue met all four prongs of this test and so W. J. Howey could be held liable for violating § 5 of the Securities Act of 1933. Furthermore, Murphy held that the fact that some of the investors chose to use services other than those of Howey-in-the-Hills to tend to the groves was irrelevant because §5 forbids the offer of unregistered securities as well as the sale of them.

== Dissenting opinion ==
Justice Felix Frankfurter wrote a brief dissenting opinion. He first suggested the Supreme Court to defer to the findings of both lower courts, particularly the District Court, as it was the finder of fact in this case. He also noted that the purchasers were permitted to inspect the land before they bought it, and they were allowed the option of using their own agricultural services.

== See also ==
- United Housing Foundation, Inc. v. Forman
