= Republic of Hungary v. Simon =

2025 Case before the Supreme Court of the United States

- Supreme Court of the United States

Argued December 3, 2024 Decided February 21, 2025
- Full case name: Republic of Hungary v. Simon
- Docket no.: 23-867
- Citations: 604 U.S. ___ (more)
- Argument: Oral argument
- Decision: Opinion

Case history
- Prior: Simon v. Republic of Hungary, 77 F.4th 1077 (D.C. Cir. 2023).

Holding
- The Foreign Sovereign Immunities Act's expropriation exception requires illegally seized property to be directly traceable to commercial activity in the United States.

Court membership
- Chief Justice John Roberts Associate Justices Clarence Thomas · Samuel Alito; Sonia Sotomayor · Elena Kagan; Neil Gorsuch · Brett Kavanaugh; Amy Coney Barrett · Ketanji Brown Jackson

Case opinion
- Majority: Sotomayor, joined by unanimous

Laws applied
- Foreign Sovereign Immunities Act

Republic of Hungary v. Simon, 604 U.S. 115 (2025), is a unanimous decision of the Supreme Court of the United States, holding that for plaintiffs to sue a foreign government over illegally seized property, the expropriation exemption of the Foreign Sovereign Immunities Act requires that the property is directly traceable to transactions with a commercial nexus to the United States. The Supreme Court considered evidence that the seized property was liquidated into a general fund used for transacting with American entities insufficient, rejecting the lower courts' commingling theory.

== Background ==
During World War II, Hungary was occupied by Nazi Germany; Jews were persecuted, deported, and sent to Nazi concentration and extermination camps where they were systematically killed. The Hungarian State Railways were used to transport Jews to the camps and to transport Nazi loot out of Hungary.

Survivors of the Holocaust in Hungary sued Hungary in 2014, claiming that they were entitled to damages for their treatment by the State through its instrumentality, the Hungarian State Railways. Hungary objected, contending that an American federal district court lacked jurisdiction over it under the Foreign Sovereign Immunities Act. The case was appealed several times on the jurisdictional issue, reaching the Supreme Court in 2021. The Court remanded the case for further consideration in light of its decision that year in Federal Republic of Germany v. Philipp.

The case reached the Supreme Court again during the 2024 term and was argued on December 3, 2024.

== Supreme Court ==
In a unanimous decision written by Associate Justice Sonia Sotomayor, the Supreme Court held that illegally seized property would only be considered as having a commercial nexus to the United States if the plaintiffs could trace its involvement in American transactions. Applied to this case, showing that the Hungarian government liquidated the seized property into a general fund was insufficient for securing an exemption to the Foreign Sovereign Immunities Act.

== Impact ==
Legal commentators observed that the evidentiary threshold in the Court's decision could have broader implications for future litigation against foreign sovereigns, including Chinese state-owned enterprises, since plaintiffs must now trace property or proceeds more directly to commercial activity in the United States.
