= United Housing Foundation, Inc. v. Forman =

- Supreme Court of the United States

Decided June 16, 1975
- Full case name: United Housing Foundation, Inc. v. Forman
- Citations: 421 U.S. 837 (more)

Holding
- Shares of stock entitling a purchaser to lease an apartment in a co-op are not securities because the shares do not meet the investment contract criteria established in the Howey test.

Court membership
- Chief Justice Warren E. Burger Associate Justices William O. Douglas · William J. Brennan Jr. Potter Stewart · Byron White; Thurgood Marshall · Harry Blackmun; Lewis F. Powell Jr. · William Rehnquist

Case opinions
- Majority: POWELL, joined by BURGER, STEWART, MARSHALL, BLACKMUN, REHNQUIST
- Dissent: BRENNAN, joined by DOUGLAS, WHITE

Laws applied
- Securities Act of 1933, Securities Exchange Act of 1934

United Housing Foundation, Inc. v. Forman, 421 U.S. 837 (1975), was a United States Supreme Court case in which the court held that shares of stock entitling a purchaser to lease an apartment in a co-op are not securities because the shares do not meet the investment contract criteria established in the Howey test.

== Background ==
Forman was one of 57 residents of Co-op City, a massive cooperative housing project in New York City, organized, financed, and constructed under the New York Private Housing Finance Law (Mitchell–Lama Act). They brought this action on behalf of all the apartment owners and derivatively on behalf of the housing corporation, alleging, among other things, violations of the antifraud provisions of the Securities Act of 1933 and of the Securities Exchange Act of 1934 (hereafter collectively Securities Acts), in connection with the sale to respondents of shares of the common stock of the cooperative housing corporation. Citing substantial increases in the tenants' monthly rental charges as a result of higher construction costs, respondents' claim centered on a Co-op City Information Bulletin issued in the project's initial stages, which allegedly misrepresented that the developers would absorb future cost increases due to such factors as inflation.

Under the Mitchell-Lama Act, which was designed to encourage private developers to build low-cost cooperative housing, New York provides large, long-term low-interest mortgage loans and substantial tax exemptions, conditioned on step-by-step state supervision of the cooperative's development. Developers must agree to operate the facilities "on a nonprofit basis," and they may lease apartments to only state-approved lessees whose incomes are below a certain level.

Several corporations built, promoted, controlled Co-op City at the time of the Forman case: United Housing Foundation (UHF), a nonprofit membership corporation, initiated and sponsored the project; Riverbay, a nonprofit cooperative housing corporation, was organized by UHF to own and operate the land and buildings and issue the stock that is the subject of the instant action; and Community Securities, Inc. (CSI), UHF's wholly owned subsidiary, was the project's general contractor and sales agent. To acquire a Co-op City apartment, a prospective purchaser must buy 18 shares of Riverbay stock for each room desired at $25 per share. The shares could not be transferred to a non-tenant, pledged, encumbered, or bequeathed (except to a surviving spouse), and they did not convey voting rights based on the number owned. (Each apartment had one vote regardless of the shares). On termination of occupancy, a tenant was required to offer his stock to Riverbay at $25 per share, and, in the unlikely event that Riverbay did not repurchase, the tenant could not sell his shares for more than their original price, plus a fraction of the mortgage amortization that the tenant had paid during the tenancy, and then only to a prospective tenant satisfying the statutory income eligibility requirements. Under the Co-op City Lease arrangement, the resident was committed to make monthly rental payments in accordance with the size, nature, and location of the apartment.

The Securities Acts define a "security" as "any... stock, ... investment contract, ... or, in general, any interest or instrument commonly known as a security.'" UHF and the other corporations moved to dismiss the complaint for lack of federal jurisdiction, maintaining that the Riverbay stock did not constitute securities as thus defined. The federal District Court granted the motion to dismiss. The Second Circuit Court of Appeals reversed, holding that (1) since the shares purchased were called "stock," the definitional sections of the Securities Acts were literally applicable, and (2) the transaction was an investment contract under the Securities Acts, there being a profit expectation from rental reductions resulting from (i) the income produced by commercial facilities established for the use of Co-op City tenants; (ii) tax deductions for the portion of monthly rental charges allocable to interest payments on the mortgage; and (iii) savings based on the fact that Co-op City apartments cost substantially less than comparable nonsubsidized housing.

The Supreme Court granted certiorari.

== Opinion of the court ==
The Supreme Court issued an opinion on June 16, 1975.
