= Waetzig v. Halliburton Energy Services, Inc. =

2025 US Supreme Court case

- Supreme Court of the United States

Argued January 14, 2025 Decided February 26, 2025
- Full case name: Gary Waetzig v. Halliburton Energy Services, Inc.
- Docket no.: 23-971
- Citations: 604 U.S. 305 (more)
- Argument: Oral argument
- Decision: Opinion

Case history
- Prior: 82 F. 4th 918 (10th Cir.)

Court membership
- Chief Justice John Roberts Associate Justices Clarence Thomas · Samuel Alito; Sonia Sotomayor · Elena Kagan; Neil Gorsuch · Brett Kavanaugh; Amy Coney Barrett · Ketanji Brown Jackson

Case opinion
- Majority: Alito, joined by unanimous

Laws applied
- Rules 41(a) and 60(b) of the Federal Rules of Civil Procedure

Waetzig v. Halliburton Energy Services, Inc., 604 U.S. 305 (2025), is a United States Supreme Court case holding that Rule 60(b) of the Federal Rules of Civil Procedure empowers federal courts to reverse voluntary dismissals when based on a mistake, among other reasons.

== Background ==
After being fired from Halliburton Energy Services, Gary Waetzig filed a federal age discrimination lawsuit under the Age Discrimination in Employment Act of 1967 in the US District Court for the District of Colorado. Citing an arbitration clause, Halliburton forced Waetzig to arbitrate his claim before bringing it to court. Since Waetzig mistakenly believed the District Court would retain jurisdiction over the arbitration, he dismissed the lawsuit without prejudice under Rule 41(a) of the Federal Rules of Civil Procedure (FRCP).

After losing in arbitration, Waetzig sought to challenge that judgement over perceived procedural errors. Citing Rule 60(b) of the FRCP, which empowers courts to relieve parties "from a final judgement, order, or proceeding" when based on a mistake, Waetzig sought to cancel his original case's dismissal. Recognizing that Waetzig was mistaken in filing a dismissal instead of a stay pending arbitration, the District Court construed his dismissal as a final proceeding.

On appeal, the Tenth Circuit reversed the District Court, holding that Rule 60(b)'s use of "proceedings" only refers to court-initiated actions, given that only courts can issue final judgements and orders. This interpretation differed from the Fifth and Seventh Circuits' holdings, creating a circuit split.

== Supreme Court ==
In a unanimous opinion written by Associate Justice Samuel Alito, the Supreme Court held that voluntary dismissals under Rule 41(a) qualify as a final proceeding. First, Alito noted that this broad meaning of "proceeding" was supported by legal dictionaries contemporaneous with Rule 60(b)'s creation. Second, the phrase "judgement, order, or proceeding" shows ascending generality, such that "proceeding" should be interpreted broader than court-initiated orders. Third, Rule 60(b) was modeled after a California state law that the Supreme Court of California considered applicable to voluntary dismissals. The issue of whether the District Court had jurisdiction to vacate the arbitration award was left to the lower courts on remand.
