= Bouarfa v. Mayorkas =

- Supreme Court of the United States

Argued October 15, 2024 Decided December 10, 2024
- Full case name: Bourafa v. Mayorkas, Secretary of Homeland Security, et al.
- Docket no.: 23–583
- Citations: 604 U.S. 6 (more)
- Argument: Oral argument
- Opinion announcement: Opinion announcement
- Decision: Opinion

Case history
- Prior: Federal District Court and the Eleventh Circuit Court of Appeals

Holding
- The revocation of a visa by the Department of Homeland Security is not judicially reviewable.

Court membership
- Chief Justice John Roberts Associate Justices Clarence Thomas · Samuel Alito; Sonia Sotomayor · Elena Kagan; Neil Gorsuch · Brett Kavanaugh; Amy Coney Barrett · Ketanji Brown Jackson

Case opinion
- Majority: Jackson, joined by unanimous

Bouarfa v. Mayorkas, 604 U.S. 6 (2024), is a United States Supreme Court case about whether an individual can obtain judicial review regarding a revoked visa petition based on non-discretionary criteria. The US Supreme Court ruled that visa revocations are left to the discretion of the Homeland Security Department, so they cannot be judicially reviewed.

== Background ==
In 8 U.S.C. §1155, Congress granted the Secretary of Homeland Security broad authority to revoke an approved visa petition "at any time, for what he deems to be good and sufficient cause."

In 2014, plaintiff Bouarfa, a U.S. citizen, filed a visa application for permanent legal residence (Green Card) for her husband, Hamayel. The U.S. Citizenship and Immigration Services (USCIS) of the Homeland Security Department approved, only to revoke the approval later, stating that her husband had entered into a previous "sham marriage" to stay in the United States. The Board of Immigration Appeals affirmed the revocation of the visa application for permanent legal residence.

== Proceedings ==
Bouarfa challenged the USCIS's revocation as arbitrary and capricious in the U.S. District Court for the Middle District of Florida. The District Court dismissed the suit, holding that it has no jurisdiction over the USCIS's revocation. The Court of Appeals for the Eleventh Circuit Court affirmed.

In April 2024, the Supreme Court granted the petition for a writ of certiorari.

== Supreme Court ==
The Supreme Court affirmed the decision of the Court of Appeals for the Eleventh Circuit, stating that "revocation of an approved visa petition under §1155 based on a sham-marriage determination by the Secretary of Homeland Security is the kind of discretionary decision that falls within the purview of 8 U.S.C. §1252(a)(2)(B)(ii), which strips federal courts of jurisdiction to review certain actions 'in the discretion of' the agency."

Justice Ketanji Brown Jackson delivered the court's unanimous opinion.

== Reactions ==
Before the Supreme Court's decision, the American Civil Liberties Union criticized the lower courts' rulings, arguing that "the case has potentially devastating consequences for noncitizens and their families" and that "in some situations, federal courts would be precluded from reviewing even a blatant constitutional violation—such as if the agency based its decision on racial stereotyping".
