= Alyeska Pipeline Service Co. v. Wilderness Society =

1975 US Supreme Court case on American Rule of attorney's fees

- Supreme Court of the United States

Argued January 22, 1975 Decided May 12, 1975
- Full case name: Alyeska Pipeline Service Company v. Wilderness Society
- Docket no.: 73-1977
- Citations: 421 U.S. 240 (more) 95 S.Ct. 1612
- Argument: Oral argument
- Opinion announcement: Opinion announcement

Case history
- Prior: 495 F.2d 1026 (D.C. Cir.)

Court membership
- Chief Justice Warren E. Burger Associate Justices William O. Douglas · William J. Brennan Jr. Potter Stewart · Byron White; Thurgood Marshall · Harry Blackmun; Lewis F. Powell Jr. · William Rehnquist

Case opinions
- Majority: White, joined by Burger, Stewart, Blackmun, and Rehnquist
- Dissent: Brennan
- Dissent: Marshall
- Douglas and Powell took no part in the consideration or decision of the case.
- Abrogated by
- Civil Rights Attorney's Fees Award Act of 1976

Alyeska Pipeline Service Co. v. Wilderness Society, 421 U.S. 240 (1975), is a United States Supreme Court case in which the Court affirmed the American rule of attorney's fees, which makes each side of civil litigation responsible for their legal costs, regardless of which side prevails, unless Congress statutorily legislates otherwise.

In response, Congress passed the Civil Rights Attorney's Fees Award Act of 1976 to award attorney's fees to the prevailing party in certain civil rights cases

== Background ==
In June 1969, the Alyeska Pipeline Service Company applied to the US Department of the Interior for a right of way permit to build an oil pipeline from the Alaska North Slope. In March 1970, the Wilderness Society, Environmental Defense Fund, and Friends of the Earth sued to enjoin the issuance of such permits under the Mineral Leasing Act of 1920 and National Environmental Policy Act.

In 1970, the US District Court for D.C. issued a preliminary injunction before dissolving it once the Interior Department released its environmental, economic, and security analysis of the pipeline. In February 1973, the US Court of Appeals for the D.C. Circuit reissued the injunction on appeal under the Mineral Leasing Act. However, in November 1973, Congress amended that law to explicitly authorize this trans-Alaska oil pipeline.

With the case mooted, the Circuit Court ordered the Alyeska Pipeline Service Company to pay the plaintiffs' legal costs because they had performed the role of a "private attorney general" in enforcing statutory law. Under the American rule of attorney's fees, each side of civil litigation is responsible for their legal costs, regardless of the outcome, unless Congress legislates otherwise. However, the Circuit Court reasoned that an exclusion was a necessary use of its equitable powers to incentivize private parties into enforce federal law against wealthy corporations. In 1974, the Supreme Court granted certiorari to review this decision.

== Supreme Court ==
Writing for the majority, Associate Justice Byron White noted that the American Rule had been repeatedly upheld by the Supreme Court since its 1796 decision in Arcambel v. Wiseman, despite differing from the English Rule that the losing party pays both sides' legal costs. Since Congress had previously legislated exceptions to the American Rule, White considered it unnecessary for courts to order further deviations, while recognizing the significant academic criticism of this practice.

Further, in 1966, Congress legislated that parties which prevail over the federal government in civil litigation can recover their judicial costs, such as court filing fees, but not their attorney's fees. Thus, the majority highlighted that the "private attorney general" theory would be unenforceable in cases against the federal government.

=== Dissents ===
Associate Justices William J. Brennan Jr. and Thurgood Marshall filed separate dissents. Brennan praised Circuit Judge J. Skelly Wright for recognizing that the "private attorney general" framing is necessary to incentivize civil rights litigation. Marshall criticized the majority for maintaining the judicial exceptions to the American Rule when court orders are willfully disobeyed or the losing party acts in bad faith, while limiting further evolution of the courts' equitable powers. Further, in Mills v. Electric Auto-Lite Co. (1970), the Supreme Court opined that when Congress does not specify the distribution of legal costs, courts may freely exercise their equitable powers in distributing them.

== Legacy ==
This decision was widely criticized by Democrats and Republicans alike, prompting Congress to pass the Civil Rights Attorney's Fees Award Act of 1976, which awards attorney's fees to the prevailing party in certain civil rights cases.

The proposed Alaska gas pipeline has remained in limbo for more than fifty years, as multiple energy companies have been unable to fund the significant infrastructure costs.
