= Royal Canin U.S.A., Inc. v. Wullschleger =

Royal Canin U.S.A. v. Wullschleger
- Supreme Court of the United States

Argued October 7, 2024 Decided January 15, 2025
- Full case name: Royal Canin U.S.A., Inc., et al. v. Wullschleger et al.
- Docket no.: 23-677
- Citations: 604 U.S. ___ (more)
- Argument: Oral argument
- Decision: Opinion

Holding
- After a defendant has removed a case to federal court, a plaintiff can amend the complaint to omit all references to federal law and have the case sent back to state court.

Court membership
- Chief Justice John Roberts Associate Justices Clarence Thomas · Samuel Alito; Sonia Sotomayor · Elena Kagan; Neil Gorsuch · Brett Kavanaugh; Amy Coney Barrett · Ketanji Brown Jackson

Case opinion
- Majority: Kagan, joined by unanimous

Royal Canin U.S.A. v. Wullschleger, 604 U.S. 22 (2025), was a United States Supreme Court case in which the Court held that, after a defendant has removed a case to federal court, a plaintiff can amend the complaint to omit all references to federal law and have the case sent back to state court. A court in the United States must have subject matter jurisdiction over all of the claims brought to it. Under federal question jurisdiction, a federal court has jurisdiction over all claims based on federal law but no jurisdiction over any claim based on state law. However, a case with federal claims may be filed in state court, with or without state-law claims. The defendant has the right to remove the case to federal court, and the federal court can decide the state-law claims as well if doing so is permitted under supplemental jurisdiction. However, according to the Supreme Court in the Royal Canin case, a plaintiff can destroy a federal court's federal question jurisdiction over a case by amending the complaint to remove all federal claims. Supplemental jurisdiction does not allow a federal court to decide a case composed entirely of state-law claims. After such an amendment, the federal court lacks any jurisdiction, so the case must be returned to state court.

== Background ==
Royal Canin U.S.A. sold dog food that required a prescription to buy. Wullschleger bought the dog food thinking it contained medicine unavailable with other brands. Wullschleger alleged she was mistaken and sued Royal Canin, U.S.A. in Missouri, for allegedly charging a higher price than it was worth, under the Missouri Manufacturing Practices Act, state antitrust law, and the Federal Food, Drug and Cosmetic Act. Royal Canin, U.S.A. then removed the case to Federal District Court, alleging there was federal question jurisdiction. Wullschleger then fixed its original complaint to delete all references to the F.D.C.A. and sought a return to state court. The District Court denied that request; Wullschleger appealed to the United States Court of Appeals for the Eighth Circuit, and that Circuit reversed and remanded the case. Royal Canin, U.S.A. filed a writ of certiorari, which the Supreme Court granted.

== Supreme Court ==
=== The Court's Main Holding ===
In an opinion written by Justice Elena Kagan, the Supreme Court decided that, when a complaint is amended, whether the court has jurisdiction depends on the amended complaint. Kagan reasoned that there was clearly no federal question left after the amendment and therefore the court may not hear the state claims, because there was no federal claim to which the state claims could be supplemental. This brought the rule on amended claims into line with the rule that a plaintiff may defeat diversity jurisdiction by adding defendants from the same state as himself. The court affirmed the judgment of the Circuit Court.

=== Distinguishing Royal Canin's Counterarguments ===
Royal Canin U.S.A. argued that a different rule applies in cases removed from state to federal court. Royal Canin cited Carnegie Mellon Univ. v. Cohill, 484 U.S. 343 (1988) for a single statement that, once federal claims are excised from the complaint, the federal court has a good reason to dismiss the claims, but not an obligation to do so. Kagan dismissed that reasoning as mere dicta since Cohill decided a different issue. Royal Canin also cited to a footnote in Rockwell International Corp. v. United States. Rockwell held that when a case is originally raised in federal court, the amended complaint removing all federal claims does deprive the court of federal-question and supplemental jurisdiction. The footnote, however, stated that the rule would be different in removed cases due to forum shopping concerns. Kagan dismissed this footnote as poorly-argued dicta as well.

=== Distinguishing Contrary Precedent ===
There is at least one situation in which the plaintiff may not defeat jurisdiction just by amending the complaint. Kagan acknowledged, in a footnote, that the supreme court already ruled that, in diversity cases, the court is not deprived of jurisdiction when the plaintiff amends the complaint to assert an amount in controversy below the threshold. But, she argued, the amount in controversy is more of a fact question than a jurisdictional one and the outcome of that other case was necessary to prevent excessive litigation over the value of a claim. Deleting claims or adding parties, however, are the plaintiff's prerogative.
