= Lackey v. Stinnie =

- Supreme Court of the United States

Argued October 8, 2024 Decided February 25, 2025
- Full case name: Gerald Lackey, Commissioner of the Virginia Department of Motor Vehicles v. Damian Stinnie et al.
- Docket no.: 23-621
- Citations: 604 U.S. 192 (more)
- Argument: Oral argument
- Decision: Opinion

Holding
- Parties that secure a preliminary injunction have not "prevailed" for the purposes of recovering attorneys' fees, even if their case was mooted by the challenged law's repeal.

Court membership
- Chief Justice John Roberts Associate Justices Clarence Thomas · Samuel Alito; Sonia Sotomayor · Elena Kagan; Neil Gorsuch · Brett Kavanaugh; Amy Coney Barrett · Ketanji Brown Jackson

Case opinions
- Majority: Roberts, joined by Thomas, Alito, Kagan, Gorsuch, Kavanaugh, and Barrett
- Dissent: Jackson, joined by Sotomayor

Laws applied
- Civil Rights Attorney's Fees Award Act of 1976

Lackey v. Stinnie, 604 U.S. 192 (2025), is a United States Supreme Court case holding that a preliminary injunction under the Civil Rights Attorney's Fees Award Act of 1976 does not qualify the litigants as the "prevailing party" for the purposes of recouping attorney's fees, even if case was ended due to mootness of the challenged law being repealed before further judicial proceedings. This case reinforced the "American rule" that each side pays its legal costs unless a statute expressly authorizes otherwise.

== Background ==
In 2018, a group of Virginia drivers represented by lead plaintiff Damian Stinnie challenged a Virginia state law that automatically suspended the driver's license of anyone yet to pay fines, forfeitures, or restitution assessed by state or federal courts. Stinnie challenged the law's constitutionality, alleging that it violated the Due Process Clause by failing to provide notice of the suspension and the Equal Protection Clause as applied to those unable to pay their legal obligations.

After securing a preliminary injunction from the US District Court for the Western District of Virginia, Stinnie's case became moot after the April 2020 repeal of this state law. Stinnie sought to recoup his attorney's fees under the Civil Rights Attorney's Fees Award Act of 1976 as a "prevailing party," given that his lawsuit prompted the law's repeal. However, relying on the Fourth Circuit's decision in Smyth v. Rivero (2002), this district court denied that its preliminary injunction entitled Stinnie to this award, simply because the external circumstances had changed.

In 2023, the Fourth Circuit issued an en banc overturning of its decision in Smyth to award attorney's fees to Stinnie. Gerald Lackey, the Commissioner of the Virginia Department of Motor Vehicles, appealed this decision to the Supreme Court.

== Supreme Court ==
Writing for the majority, Chief Justice John Roberts relied upon Buckhannon Board & Care Home, Inc. v. West Virginia Dept. of Health and Human Resources (2001), which held that a lawsuit prompting legislative repeal of the challenged law does not entitle the plaintiff to recoup their attorney's fees. Noting that preliminary injunctions are issued without fully analyzing the case's merits, the majority opined that a party does not prevail until it secured a final verdict.

Since the Civil Rights Attorney's Fees Award Act of 1976 was adopted in response to the Supreme Court's decision in Alyeska Pipeline Service Co. v. Wilderness Society (1975), the majority reasoned that Congress could again legislate if it wished to further modify the "American rule" of legal costs.

=== Dissent ===
Associate Justice Ketanji Brown Jackson dissented, highlighting that every federal appellate court except the First Circuit had considered this issue and all treated preliminary injunctions as entitling the litigants to attorney's fees if the law was repealed before final judgement. Jackson distinguished this case from Buckhannon, as Stinnie had already secured a preliminary injunction before the case became moot.

Jackson criticized the majority for diminishing the incentive to litigate civil rights cases and encouraging unnecessary litigation for plaintiffs already satisfied by the protection of a preliminary injunction.

== Reception ==
The American Civil Liberties Union, which had filed an amicus brief in support of Stinnie, criticized the decision. Echoing Jackson's dissent, the ACLU lamented that this decision would diminish the financial viability of its work.
