= Delligatti v. United States =

2025 US Supreme Court case

- Supreme Court of the United States

Argued November 12, 2024 Decided March 21, 2025
- Full case name: Salvatore Delligatti v. United States
- Docket no.: 23-825
- Citations: 604 U.S. 423 (more)
- Argument: Oral argument
- Decision: Opinion

Case history
- Prior: 83 F. 4th 113 (2d Cir.)

Questions presented
- Does a crime that requires proof of bodily injury or death, but can be committed by failing to take action, involve the use, attempted use, or threatened use of physical force?

Holding
- A state second-degree murder charge that includes omission satisfies the federal criminal code's definition of violent crime.

Court membership
- Chief Justice John Roberts Associate Justices Clarence Thomas · Samuel Alito; Sonia Sotomayor · Elena Kagan; Neil Gorsuch · Brett Kavanaugh; Amy Coney Barrett · Ketanji Brown Jackson

Case opinions
- Majority: Thomas, joined by Roberts, Alito, Sotomayor, Kagan, Kavanaugh, and Barrett
- Dissent: Gorsuch, joined by Jackson

Laws applied
- 18 U.S.C. §924(c)

Delligatti v. United States, 604 U.S. 423 (2025), is a United States Supreme Court case clarifying that Title 18 of the US Code's definition of "violent crime" encompasses crimes of omission that result in physical force using firearms.

== Background ==
Under federal law, anyone carrying a firearm while committing a violent crime that "has as an element the use, attempted use, or threatened use of physical force against the person or property of another" faces a mandatory minimum sentence of five years in prison. Rather than assess the physical force used in a specific case, courts apply this statute when defendants are charged with a crime that always involves one of these elements.

In 2014, a gas station owner hired Salvatore Delligatti of the Genovese crime family to kill Joseph Bonelli, a suspected police informant. Delligatti recruited gang members to conduct the killing, but police thwarted the plan. Delligatti contested that a second-degree murder charge under New York state law does not qualify as violent crime because it can also be applied to failure to perform a legal duty.

== Supreme Court ==
Writing for the majority, Associate Justice Clarence Thomas rejected Delligatti's claim, holding that an omission resulting in violent crime with firearms and physical force should be construed as committing such violent crime. Citing the federal government's brief, Thomas noted that when the elements of violent crime clause was added in 1986, at least 33 states defined criminal culpability as including omission of a legal duty.

=== Dissent ===
Associate Justice Neil Gorsuch dissented, opining that legislative intent should only be used to resolve statutory ambiguity, whereas the challenged clause lists three specific types of violent crime, none of which encompass omission. Furthermore, legislative history from 1981 shows that the Senate understood that crimes of omission were not covered by this clause. In United States v. Davis (2019), Gorsuch wrote for the majority in rendering the subsequent "residual clause" unenforceable for being unconstitutionally vague, leading him to lament that this decision expands the scope of the elements clause to encompass crimes previously charged under the residual clause.
