= Williams v. Reed =

- Supreme Court of the United States

Argued October 7, 2024 Decided February 21, 2025
- Full case name: Nancy Williams, et al. v. Greg Reed, Alabama Secretary of Workforce
- Docket no.: 23-191
- Citations: 604 U.S. 168 (more)
- Argument: Oral argument

Case history
- Prior: Johnson v. Alabama Secretary of Labor, Fitzgerald Washington, (Ala. 2023)

Holding
- Where a state court's application of a state exhaustion requirement in effect immunizes state officials from § 1983 claims challenging delays in the administrative process, state courts may not deny those § 1983 claims on failure-to-exhaust grounds.

Court membership
- Chief Justice John Roberts Associate Justices Clarence Thomas · Samuel Alito; Sonia Sotomayor · Elena Kagan; Neil Gorsuch · Brett Kavanaugh; Amy Coney Barrett · Ketanji Brown Jackson

Case opinions
- Majority: Kavanaugh, joined by Roberts, Sotomayor, Kagan, and Jackson
- Dissent: Thomas, joined by Alito, Gorsuch, and Barrett (all only joining Part II)

Laws applied
- Ku Klux Klan Act

Williams v. Reed, 604 U.S. 168 (2025), is a decision of the United States Supreme Court holding that state laws requiring exhaustion of state administrative remedies are preempted by 42 U.S.C. § 1983 of the federal Ku Klux Klan Act when they prevent a state court from hearing claims challenging delays in the administrative process.

== Background ==
Congress passed the Ku Klux Klan Act in 1871 to combat the violence and intimidation tactics used by the Ku Klux Klan to interfere with the civil rights of African Americans during the Reconstruction era, empowering the federal government to intervene and protect those rights. Section 1 of the Act, amended and codified at 42 U.S.C. § 1983 and commonly known as "Section 1983", allows individuals to sue state or local government officials for violations of their constitutional rights. It provides a legal remedy for individuals who believe their rights, as protected by the U.S. Constitution, have been violated by persons acting under state law. Since its passage, Section 1983 has become the most widely used civil rights enforcement statute. In Haywood v. Drown (2009), the Supreme Court held that Section 1983 suits may be heard in either state or federal courts.

Alabama state law includes unemployment benefits. Any Alabama resident seeking such benefits must file an application with the Alabama Department of Workforce (formerly Dept. of Labor). Department examiners determine if and how much the claimant is entitled to receive state benefits. Claimants may appeal to a tribunal of Department of Labor employees. The appellate body must notify the parties in writing of its findings of fact, decision, and reasoning. This statutory scheme requires that prior to having claims heard in court, applicants must exhaust all administrative remedies.

== Lower court history ==
Petitioners, including Nancy Williams, are Alabama unemployment compensation benefits claimants. Despite the statutory requirements that parties be notified promptly regarding the dispositions of their claims, the Department of Labor often took months in making its initial determinations regarding benefits eligibility, with some petitioners never receiving any determination regarding their claims. Some petitioners' benefits were stopped with little or no prior notice. Some petitioners failed to have hearings scheduled where they could dispute the Department's determinations.

Petitioners filed suit under Section 1983 in Montgomery County, Alabama, claiming that the Department of Labor violated both their constitutional right to due process, and their federal rights under the Social Security Act of 1935. Petitioners sought injunctive relief, including an injunction directing the Alabama Secretary of Labor, Fitzgerald Washington, to issue prompt decisions on applicants' claims. Washington moved to dismiss the suit on the grounds that petitioners had not exhausted their administrative remedies before bringing suit in Circuit Court—the Court granted the motion to dismiss, and denied petitioners' motion to reconsider. The Alabama Supreme Court affirmed the dismissal on the grounds that petitioners failed to exhaust their state administrative remedies before bringing suit.

== Supreme Court ==
On August 28, 2023, Williams petitioned the Supreme Court to hear her case. On January 12, 2024, the court granted certiorari. The court decided the case on February 21, 2025.

=== Majority ===
Writing for the majority, Associate Justice Brett Kavanaugh framed the exhaustion of state administrative remedies requirement as a Catch-22 for delaying Section 1983 claims that would order state officials to expedite their administrative processes. The Supreme Court held that even if state courts offered writs of mandamus for similar orders to expedite administrative processes, individuals still retain their Section 1983 rights to sue before exhausting state remedies.

=== Dissent ===
Associate Justice Clarence Thomas dissented, arguing that the majority erred both from first principles and precedent, only the latter of which was supported the three other dissenting justices. In the first section, Thomas reiterated his dissent in Haywood v. Drown that state courts should not be compelled to hear federal claims. In Thomas' view, the Supremacy Clause only forces state courts to recognize the preemption of federal laws over state and local ones, not adjudicate federal claims themselves.

In Thomas' second section, he distinguished that Haywood only prohibited states from depriving their courts of jurisdiction over disfavored federal claims, whereas Alabama's exhaustion of state remedies requirement delays all federal claims. Thomas further cited Moody v. NetChoice, LLC (2024) to argue that because the plaintiffs made a facial challenge against the state law before the Supreme Court of Alabama, they should have been barred from later arguing that as applied to their specific procedural delays, the exhaustion requirement was a due process violation. However, the majority rebutted that the plaintiffs made both facial and as-applied challenges in state court.
