= Bufkin v. Collins =

2025 US Supreme Court case

- Supreme Court of the United States

Argued October 16, 2024 Decided March 5, 2025
- Full case name: Joshua Bufkin and Norman Thornton v. Doug Collins, Secretary of Veterans Affairs
- Docket no.: 23-713
- Citations: 604 U.S. 369 (more)
- Argument: Oral argument
- Decision: Opinion

Holding
- The Court of Appeals for Veterans Claims must apply clear error review when reviewing the Department of Veterans Affairs's application of the "benefit-of-the-doubt rule" regarding a veteran's claim to a service-related disability.

Court membership
- Chief Justice John Roberts Associate Justices Clarence Thomas · Samuel Alito; Sonia Sotomayor · Elena Kagan; Neil Gorsuch · Brett Kavanaugh; Amy Coney Barrett · Ketanji Brown Jackson

Case opinions
- Majority: Thomas, joined by Roberts, Alito, Sotomayor, Kagan, Kavanaugh, and Barrett
- Dissent: Jackson, joined by Gorsuch

Laws applied
- 38 U.S.C. § 5107 and § 7261

Bufkin v. Collins, 604 U.S. 369 (2025), is a United States Supreme Court case in which the court held that the Court of Appeals for Veterans Claims must apply clear error review when reviewing the Department of Veterans Affairs's application of the "benefit-of-the-doubt rule" regarding a veteran's claim to a service-related disability.

== Background ==
In 1988, Congress passed the Veterans' Judicial Review Act, instructing the US Department of Veterans Affairs (VA) to apply a "benefit-of-the-doubt rule" favoring a veteran's claim to a service-related disability. Prior to this law, adverse determinations could only be appealed to the Board of Veterans' Appeals, but this law created a further Court of Appeals for Veterans Claims.

Responding to complaints that the Court of Appeals for Veterans Claims was too deferential to the VA and Board of Veterans' Appeals, Congress passed the Veterans Benefits Act of 2002. This act instructed the appeals court to "take due account of the Secretary's application" of the benefit-of-the-doubt rule. However, this clause follows a section of the Veterans' Judicial Review Act instructing the Court of Appeals for Veterans Claims to conduct de novo review of legal issues and clear error review of factual issues.

In determining the post-traumatic stress disorder disability claims of Joshua Bufkin and Norman Thornton, the Court of Appeals for Veterans Claims treated application of the benefit-of-the-doubt rule as a factual issue, deferring to the VA's judgement that their cases were not in "approximate balance." Bufkin and Thornton sued, arguing that the 2002 amendment turned application of the benefit-of-the-doubt rule into a legal issue, but this argument was rejected by the US Court of Appeals for the Federal Circuit.

== Supreme Court ==
In a majority opinion written by Associate Justice Clarence Thomas, the Supreme Court held that the application of the benefit-of-the-doubt rule is a mixed question primarily involving biomedical facts, necessitating clear error review. Whereas Ornelas v. United States (1996) held that appellate courts should review probable cause determinations for warrantless searches de novo, Thomas distinguished that case as involving Fourth Amendment constitutional rights, rather than statutory rights.

=== Dissent ===
Associate Justice Ketanji Brown Jackson dissented, noting that in statutory interpretation, surplusage is disfavored. In other words, the "take due account" clause should not be considered redundant with the prior section, especially when it was added to address excessive deference to the VA. Furthermore, Jackson recognized a "veterans canon" that ambiguous provisions should be interpreted in the veteran's favor.
