= E.M.D. Sales, Inc. v. Carrera =

- Supreme Court of the United States

Argued November 5, 2024 Decided January 15, 2025
- Full case name: E.M.D. Sales, Inc., et al. v. Faustino Sanchez Carrera, et al.
- Docket no.: 23-217
- Citations: 604 U.S. 45 (more)
- Argument: Oral argument
- Decision: Opinion

Holding
- A preponderance-of-the-evidence standard applies when an employer seeks to show that an employee is exempt from the minimum-wage and overtime pay provisions of the Fair Labor Standards Act.

Court membership
- Chief Justice John Roberts Associate Justices Clarence Thomas · Samuel Alito; Sonia Sotomayor · Elena Kagan; Neil Gorsuch · Brett Kavanaugh; Amy Coney Barrett · Ketanji Brown Jackson

Case opinions
- Majority: Kavanaugh, joined by unanimous
- Concurrence: Gorsuch, joined by Thomas

Laws applied
- Fair Labor Standards Act

E.M.D. Sales, Inc. v. Carrera, 604 U.S. 45 (2025), was a United States Supreme Court case, which unanimously held that a preponderance of evidence standard applies when an employer argues that an employee is exempt from the minimum wage and overtime pay provisions of the Fair Labor Standards Act. The decision reiterated this standard as the default for civil ligation in the absence of a statute or constitutional case law requiring more stringent review.

== Background ==
The Fair Labor Standards Act of 1938 (FLSA) guarantees a federal minimum wage for covered workers and overtime pay for those working beyond forty hours per week.

In 2021, the US District Court for the District of Maryland ruled that E.M.D. Sales had not shown that the overtime exemption for outside salespeople applies to its sales representatives under a clear and convincing standard. On appeal, the US Court of Appeals for the Fourth Circuit affirmed that the less stringent preponderance of evidence standard did not apply.

In the 1989 case Price Waterhouse v. Hopkins, the Supreme Court ruled that the sex discrimination protections of Title VII of the Civil Rights Act of 1964 should be considered under a preponderance of evidence standard, the default for civil litigation in the United States. However, in Clark v. J.M. Benson Co. (1986), the Fourth Circuit ruled that employers must prove their employees are exempt from the FLSA's overtime provisions with clear and convincing evidence. As the federal government noted in its amicus brief to this case, that Fourth Circuit precedent erroneously relied on a Tenth Circuit decision that actually applied the preponderance of evidence standard.

== Supreme Court ==
In a unanimous opinion by Justice Kavanaugh, the Supreme Court ruled that an employer's claim to exemption from the FLSA's overtime pay provisions should be evaluated under the preponderance of evidence standard, the default for civil litigation in the United States. The Court noted that the Fifth, Sixth, Seventh, Ninth, Tenth, and Eleventh Circuit Courts have all applied a preponderance of evidence standard for such cases.

This default is only overridden if Congress explicitly specifies a higher burden of proof, constitutional case law mandates a higher standard of review, or the government is engaging in coercive action. The employees' argument that a higher standard applied because the FLSA offered unwaivable rights in the public interest was rejected. This decision only addressed the burden of proof standard, remanding the judgement of the employees' eligibility for overtime pay to the Fourth Circuit.

=== Concurrence ===
In a concurrence, Justice Gorsuch (joined only by Justice Thomas) argued against adopting higher standards of proof when not explicitly required by laws or the constitution. In support of this position, Gorsuch cited Thomas' concurrence in the 2011 case Microsoft Corp. v. i4i Ltd. Partnership. The concurrence was seen as protesting the landmark New York Times Co. v. Sullivan case, which required a higher standard of proof in libel suits brought by public officials.

== Reception ==
Adam Liptak of The New York Times noted that Kavanaugh's citation of Sullivan was a sign that that precedent remained secure, despite that Gorsuch and Thomas have repeatedly called for its overruling. This favorable citation to Sullivan to explain where constitutional case law demands a higher burden of proof was interpreted as a "faint but unmistakable" signal rebutting President Donald Trump's calls for reducing newspapers' protection from libel lawsuits.
