= Dewberry Group v. Dewberry Engineers =

2025 US Supreme Court case

Dewberry Group, Inc. v. Dewberry Engineers Inc.
- Supreme Court of the United States

Argued December 11, 2024 Decided February 26, 2025
- Full case name: Dewberry Group, Inc. v. Dewberry Engineers Inc.
- Docket no.: 23-900
- Citations: 604 U.S. 321 (more)
- Argument: Oral argument
- Decision: Opinion

Case history
- Prior: 77 F. 4th 265 (4th Cir.)

Court membership
- Chief Justice John Roberts Associate Justices Clarence Thomas · Samuel Alito; Sonia Sotomayor · Elena Kagan; Neil Gorsuch · Brett Kavanaugh; Amy Coney Barrett · Ketanji Brown Jackson

Case opinions
- Majority: Kagan, joined by unanimous
- Concurrence: Sotomayor

Laws applied
- Lanham Act (15 U.S.C. § 1117)

Dewberry Group, Inc. v. Dewberry Engineers Inc., 604 U.S. 321 (2025), is a United States Supreme Court case holding that Lanham Act awards of a "defendant's profits" in trademark infringement cases do not extend to the profits of the defendant's corporate affiliates.

== Background ==
Dewberry Engineers has a trademark on the name "Dewberry" for its real estate services. John Dewberry's Dewberry Group provides similar services through its approximately thirty affiliates. In 2022, Dewberry Engineers won a lawsuit in the US District Court for the Eastern District of Virginia over the Dewberry Group's trademark infringement. The Lanham Act entitles a plaintiff to recover the "defendant’s profits," but the Dewberry Group officially reports unprofitability while delivering income to John Dewberry through its affiliates.

Dewberry Engineers did not ask the District Court to pierce the corporate veil, nor did the District Court refer to a provision of the Lanham Act allowing judges to identify a just sum different from the defendant's stated profits. Instead, the District Court stated that the "economic reality" of the Dewberry Group necessitated aggregation of its affiliates' profits, and this reasoning was affirmed by the US Court of Appeals for the Fourth Circuit on appeal.

== Supreme Court ==
In a unanimous decision written by Associate Justice Elena Kagan, the Supreme Court held that the Lanham Act's use of "defendant's profits" does not extend to affiliate companies. The Supreme Court remanded the case to the District Court, declining to answer whether Dewberry Engineers could now argue for corporate veil-piercing and whether the just-sum provision could justify the original award.

=== Concurrence ===
Associate Justice Sonia Sotomayor wrote a concurring opinion offering two methods for the District Court to estimate the Dewberry Group's actual profit. First, the District Court could focus on the Dewberry Group's below-market rates for its affiliates. Second, the District Court could analyze the cash infusions that John Dewberry made to the Dewberry Group, presumably using profits from its affiliates.
