= City and County of San Francisco v. EPA =

Pending U.S. Supreme Court case

- Supreme Court of the United States

Argued October 16, 2024 Decided March 4, 2025
- Full case name: City and County of San Francisco, California v. Environmental Protection Agency
- Docket no.: 23-753
- Argument: Oral argument
- Opinion announcement: Opinion announcement

Case history
- Prior: Petion for review denied, City and County of San Francisco v. EPA; 75 F.4th 1074 (2023), United States Court of Appeals for the Ninth Circuit

Questions presented
- Does the Clean Water Act allow the Environmental Protection Agency (or an authorized state) to impose generic prohibitions in National Pollutant Discharge Elimination System permits that subject permit-holders to enforcement for violating water quality standards without identifying specific limits to which their discharges must conform?

Holding
- Section 1311(b)(1)(C) does not authorize the EPA to include “end-result” provisions in NPDES permits. Determining what steps a permittee must take to ensure that water quality standards are met is the EPA’s responsibility, and Congress has given it the tools needed to make that determination. United States Court of Appeals for the Ninth Circuit reversed.

Court membership
- Chief Justice John Roberts Associate Justices Clarence Thomas · Samuel Alito; Sonia Sotomayor · Elena Kagan; Neil Gorsuch · Brett Kavanaugh; Amy Coney Barrett · Ketanji Brown Jackson

Case opinions
- Majority: Alito, joined by Roberts, Thomas, Kavanaugh; Gorsuch (except Part II); Sotomayor, Kagan, Barrett, Jackson (Part II)
- Concur/dissent: Barrett (in part), joined by Sotomayor, Kagan, Jackson

Laws applied
- Clean Water Act

City and County of San Francisco v. Environmental Protection Agency, 604 U.S. 334 (2025), is a United States Supreme Court case about whether the Clean Water Act allows the Environmental Protection Agency (or an authorized state) to impose generic prohibitions in National Pollutant Discharge Elimination System permits that subject permit-holders to enforcement for violating water quality standards without identifying specific limits to which their discharges must conform.

On March 4, 2025, the Supreme Court ruled in favor of San Francisco in a 5-4 decision. Justice Samuel Alito wrote the majority opinion.

== Background ==
San Francisco has a combined sewage system that collects both sewage and stormwater runoff. When the system exceeds its capacity during heavy rains, the combined sewer overflows (CSOs) discharge pollutants into the Pacific Ocean.

The Clean Water Act requires cities to acquire a National Pollutant Discharge Elimination System (NPDES) for such discharges. The city of San Francisco has implemented a CSO plan since the late 1960s, and it has built its current CSO control facilities in 1997.

In 2019, the Environmental Protection Agency and the California Regional Water Quality Control Board issued a new National Pollutant Discharge Elimination System permit for San Francisco's Oceanside treatment facility. San Francisco filed a petition for review by the Environmental Appeals Board, arguing that these provisions were inconsistent under the Clean Water Act and EPA regulations, but the board denied the petition.

San Francisco further contends that the Environmental Protection Agency (EPA) and the Clean Water Act (CWA) lack precise definitions and quantifiable standards for water pollution. The city argues that the CWA does not specify exact limits on pollutants; instead, it prohibits discharges that are deemed excessive without providing clear metrics. Additionally, San Francisco asserts that the EPA's criteria for determining water cleanliness are ambiguous, leading to challenges in compliance and enforcement.

San Francisco then filed a petition for review by the United States Court of Appeals for the Ninth Circuit, but the court also rejected San Francisco's petition, holding that the Clean Water Act authorizes the EPA to include in the Oceanside NPDES permit the challenged provisions, and that the EPA's decision to do so was rationally connected to evidence in the administrative record.

== Supreme Court ==
The Supreme Court agreed to hear the case by writ of certiorari. The case was set to be heard during the 2024–2025 term.

On March 4, 2025, the Supreme Court released its decision, siding with San Francisco in a 5-4 ruling. Justice Samuel Alito wrote the majority opinion, joined by justices Thomas, Kavanaugh, Roberts, and Gorsuch in part, while Justice Amy Coney Barrett wrote a dissenting opinion, joined by justices Kagan, Sotomayor, and Jackson.
