= Thompson v. United States (2025) =

2025 US Supreme Court case

- Supreme Court of the United States

Argued January 14, 2025 Decided March 21, 2025
- Full case name: Patrick Daley Thompson v. United States
- Docket no.: 23-1095
- Citations: 604 U.S. 408 (more)
- Argument: Oral argument
- Opinion announcement: Opinion announcement

Case history
- Prior: 89 F. 4th 1010 (7th Cir.)

Holding
- Prosecution for making a false statement to the FDIC requires the statement to be false, rather than simply misleading.

Court membership
- Chief Justice John Roberts Associate Justices Clarence Thomas · Samuel Alito; Sonia Sotomayor · Elena Kagan; Neil Gorsuch · Brett Kavanaugh; Amy Coney Barrett · Ketanji Brown Jackson

Case opinions
- Majority: Roberts, joined by unanimous
- Concurrence: Alito
- Concurrence: Jackson

Laws applied
- 18 U.S.C. § 1014

Thompson v. United States, 604 U.S. 408 (2025), is a United States Supreme Court case holding that prosecution for making a false statement to the Federal Deposit Insurance Corporation under 18 U.S.C. § 1014 requires the statement to be false, rather than simply misleading.

== Background ==
In the United States, the Federal Deposit Insurance Corporation (FDIC) provides deposit insurance for banks and oversees the resolution of failing banks. From 2011 to 2014, Patrick Daley Thompson took three loans totaling $219,000 from the Washington Federal Bank for Savings, the first of which was for $110,000. When the bank failed in 2017, the FDIC sought to collect the outstanding amount with interest, but Thompson disputed the $269,120.58 charge, stating "I borrowed the money, I owe the money—but I borrowed—I think it was $110,000."

After the FDIC and Thompson agreed to settle the debt for $219,000, the federal government prosecuted him for making a false statement to the FDIC under 18 U.S.C. § 1014. On appeal, the US Court of Appeals for the Seventh Circuit ruled that misleading statements qualified for criminal prosecution under Section 1014.

== Supreme Court ==
Writing for a unanimous court, Chief Justice John Roberts reversed the Seventh Circuit, holding that a statement must be false for prosecution under Section 1014, rather than simply misleading. Noting that all eleven statutory precursors to Section 1014 also excluded the term "misleading," despite other laws using the combined term "false and misleading," the Supreme Court concluded that Congress intentionally excluded truthful misleading statements.

=== Concurrence ===
Associate Justices Samuel Alito and Ketanji Brown Jackson wrote concurring opinions. Alito cautioned that the falsity of misleading statements should be analyzed in context, rather than in isolation. Jackson suggested the Seventh Circuit should affirm the District Court jury's guilty verdict, noting the jury had been instructed that the standard for Section 1014 required falsity.
