= Wisconsin Bell, Inc. v. United States ex rel. Heath =

- Supreme Court of the United States

Argued November 4, 2024 Decided February 21, 2025
- Full case name: Wisconsin Bell, Inc. v. United States ex rel. Heath
- Docket no.: 23-1127
- Citations: 604 U.S. ___ (more)
- Argument: Oral argument
- Decision: Opinion

Holding
- Entities violate the False Claims Act of 1863 when they make fraudulent representations to private administrators of government programs if the disbursed funds at least partially came from the government.

Court membership
- Chief Justice John Roberts Associate Justices Clarence Thomas · Samuel Alito; Sonia Sotomayor · Elena Kagan; Neil Gorsuch · Brett Kavanaugh; Amy Coney Barrett · Ketanji Brown Jackson

Case opinions
- Majority: Kagan, joined by unanimous
- Concurrence: Thomas, joined by Kavanaugh; Alito (Part I)
- Concurrence: Kavanaugh, joined by Thomas

Laws applied
- False Claims Act of 1863 and Telecommunications Act of 1996

Wisconsin Bell, Inc. v. United States ex rel. Heath, 604 U.S. 115 (2025), is a unanimous decision of the United States Supreme Court holding that fraudulent representations made to private administrators of government programs are prosecutable under the False Claims Act of 1863 as long as the disbursed funds at least partially came from the government. The Supreme Court considered whether the government funds originated from federal appropriations, taxation, civil settlements, or criminal restitution irrelevant.

== Background ==
The Telecommunications Act of 1996 created the E-Rate program to subsidize the internet service of schools and libraries using fees charged on telecommunication carriers. The federal government tasks the Universal Service Administrative Company, a private non-profit, with administering the Universal Service Fund, which receives these corporate fees and government contributions. Carriers are required to charge the "lowest corresponding price" to schools and libraries based on their pricing for similar non-residential customers. Schools and libraries then use the Universal Service Fund to subsidize their payments.

The False Claims Act of 1863 allows private individuals to act as relators, whistleblowing fraud against the United States government on its behalf. In 2008, auditor Todd Heath sued Wisconsin Bell under this law, alleging that it was overcharging schools to collect higher subsidies from the E-Rate program. The company's legal defense was that the False Claims Act is inapplicable to statements made to private administrators of government programs that disburse funds primarily collected from fees imposed on private companies.

== Supreme Court ==
In a unanimous decision written by Associate Justice Elena Kagan, the Supreme Court held that the federal government's partial funding of the E-Rate program's Universal Service Fund was sufficient for Wisconsin Bell's fraudulent overcharges to be prosecuted under the False Claims Act of 1863.

=== Concurrences ===
Clarence Thomas' concurring opinion was split into three portions. The first, joined by Samuel Alito, explicitly noted that the Supreme Court was not opining on whether privately-administered funds financed by government regulations are effectively receiving government-provided funds, nor was it deciding whether claims submitted to the Universal Service Administrative Company are effectively claims submitted to the government.

In Thomas' second portion, he contrasted the Seventh Circuit treating funds raised through regulation as government contributions with the Fifth Circuit's rejection of this argument, a circuit split. Thomas agreed with the Fifth Circuit's view that such funds are not government contributions because if misused, the government does not experience a financial loss. Further, Thomas argued that such an expansive interpretation would allow the government to secondarily prosecute fraud in any financial transaction that it mediates, such as child support payments.

Thomas' third portion highlighted that the Government Corporation Control Act prevents the Universal Service Administrative Company from acting as an agent of the United States until authorized by Congress itself, rather than by the Federal Communications Commission.

Brett Kavanaugh, who fully joined Thomas' concurrence, filed a separate concurrence joined by Thomas, reiterating the position they shared in United States ex rel. Polansky v. Executive Health Resources, Inc. (2023). Under the unitary executive theory, only the President and their federal employees can represent the government's interests in civil litigation, making the False Claims Act's qui tam provisions unconstitutional.
