= 2024 term per curiam opinions of the Supreme Court of the United States =

The Supreme Court of the United States handed down eleven per curiam opinions during its 2024 term, which began October 7, 2024, and concluded on October 5, 2025.

Because per curiam decisions are issued from the Court as an institution, these opinions all lack the attribution of authorship or joining votes to specific justices. All justices on the Court at the time the decision was handed down are assumed to have participated and concurred unless otherwise noted.

== Court membership ==
Chief Justice: John Roberts

Associate Justices: Clarence Thomas, Samuel Alito, Sonia Sotomayor, Elena Kagan, Neil Gorsuch, Brett Kavanaugh, Amy Coney Barrett, Ketanji Brown Jackson

== Hamm v. Smith ==
- Full caption: John Q. Hamm, Commissioner, Alabama Department of Corrections v. Joseph Clifton Smith
- Citations: 604 U.S. 1
- Full text of the opinion: official slip opinion · Justia

604 U.S. 1
Decided November 4, 2024.
Eleventh Circuit vacated and remanded.

Thomas and Gorsuch noted without separate opinion that they would grant the petition for a writ of certiorari and set the case for argument.

== TikTok, Inc. v. Garland ==
- Full caption: TikTok, Inc., et al. v. Merrick B. Garland, Attorney General
- Citations: 604 U.S. 56
- Full text of the opinion: official slip opinion

604 U.S. 56
Argued January 10, 2025.
Decided January 17, 2025.
D.C. Circuit affirmed.

Sotomayor filed an opinion concurring in part and concurring in the judgment. Gorsuch filed an opinion concurring in the judgment.

== Andrew v. White ==
- Full caption: Brenda Evers Andrew v. Tamika White, Warden
- Citations: 604 U.S. 86
- Full text of the opinion: official slip opinion

604 U.S. 86
Decided January 21, 2025.
10th Circuit vacated and remanded.

Thomas filed a dissent, joined by Gorsuch. Alito filed an opinion concurring in the judgment.

== Department of Education v. California ==
- Full caption: Department of Education, et al., v. California, et al.
- Citations: 604 U.S. 650
- Full text of the opinion: official slip opinion

604 U.S. 650
Decided April 4, 2025.
The order of the United States District Court for the District of New Jersey, "styled as a temporary restraining order", is stayed pending appeal.

Chief Justice Roberts dissented without a written opinion. Kagan filed a dissent. Jackson filed a dissent, joined by Sotomayor.

== Trump v. J.G.G. ==
- Full caption: Donald J. Trump, President of the United States, et al., v. J.G.G., et al.
- Citations: 604 U.S. 670
- Full text of the opinion: official slip opinion

604 U.S. 670
Decided April 7, 2025.
The temporary restraining orders of the United States District Court for the District of Columbia, "construe[d] as appealable injunctions", are vacated. Challenges to removal under the Alien Enemies Act must be brought as habeas corpus actions in the district of confinement in Texas.

Kavanaugh filed a concurrence. Sotomayor filed a dissent, joined by Kagan and Jackson and in part by Barrett.

== A.A.R.P. v. Trump ==
- Full caption: A. A. R. P. et al. v. Trump, President of the United States, et al.
- Citations: 605 U.S. 91
- Full text of the opinion: official slip opinion

605 U.S. 91
Decided May 16, 2025.
The injunction is granted. The judgment of the Fifth Circuit is vacated, and the case is remanded to the Fifth Circuit.

Kavanaugh filed a concurrence. Alito filed a dissent, joined by Thomas.

== Oklahoma Statewide Charter School Board v. Drummond ==
- Full caption: Oklahoma Statewide Charter School Board, et al., v. Gentner Drummond, Attorney General of Oklahoma, ex rel. Oklahoma; St. Isidore of Seville Catholic Virtual School, v. Gentner Drummond, Attorney General of Oklahoma, ex rel. Oklahoma
- Citations: 605 U.S. 165
- Full text of the opinion: official slip opinion

605 U.S. 165
Decided May 22, 2025.
The judgment of the Oklahoma Supreme Court is affirmed by an equally divided Court. Associate Justice Amy Coney Barrett took no part in the consideration or decision of these cases.

== Goldey v. Fields ==
- Full caption: Howard Goldey, et al. v. Andrew Fields, III, et al.
- Citations: 606 U.S. 942
- Full text of the opinion: official slip opinion

606 U.S. 942
Decided June 30, 2025.
The judgment of the U. S. Court of Appeals for the Fourth Circuit is reversed, and the case is remanded for further proceedings.

== See also ==
- List of United States Supreme Court cases, volume 604
