= 2015 term United States Supreme Court opinions of Clarence Thomas =

The 2015 term of the Supreme Court of the United States began October 5, 2015, and concluded October 2, 2016. This was the twenty-fifth term of Associate Justice Clarence Thomas's tenure on the Court.
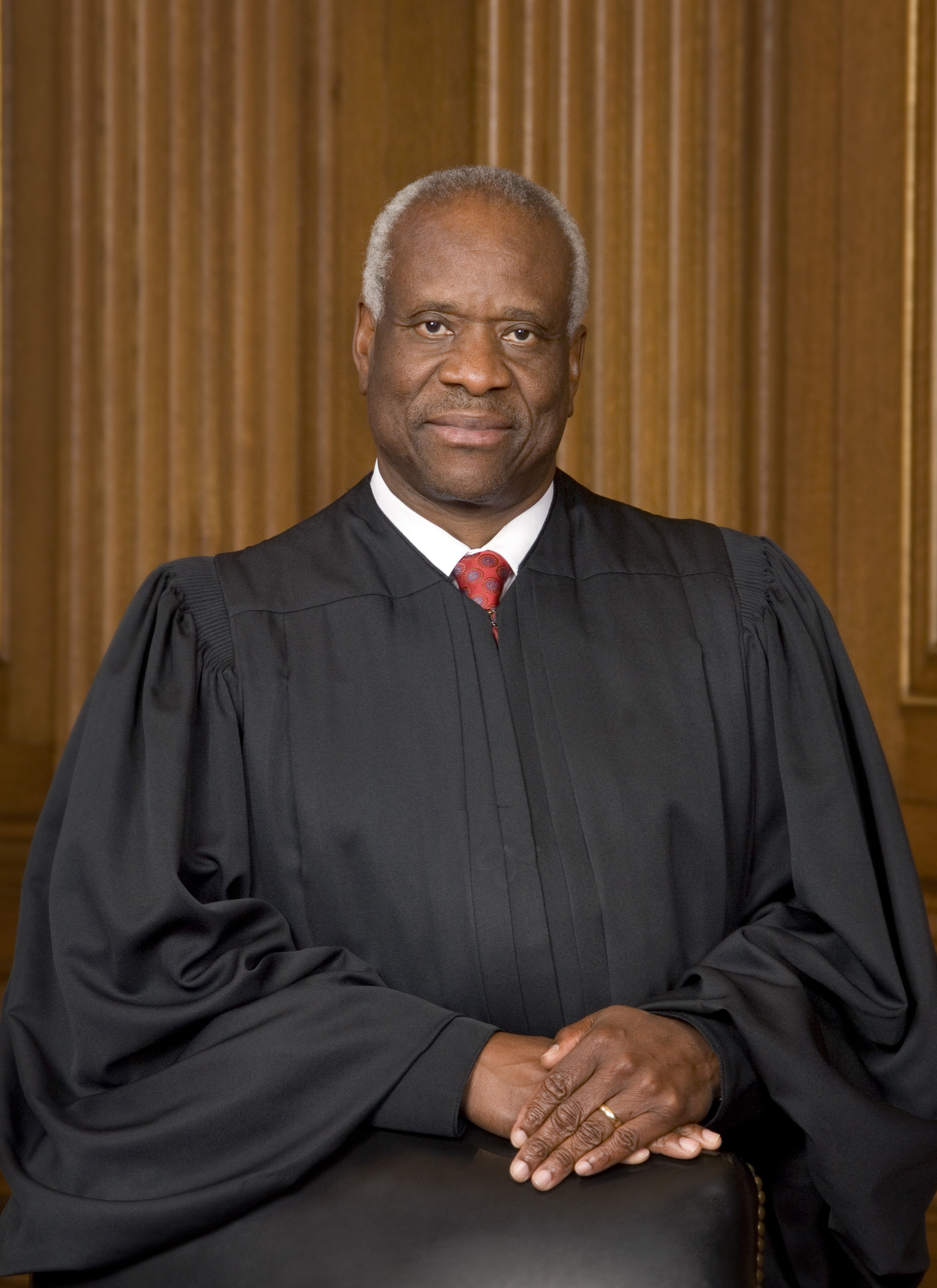

Clarence Thomas 2015 term statistics

7	Majority or plurality	16	Concurrence	0	Other
25	Dissent	1	Concurrence/dissent	Total =	49
Bench opinions = 39		Opinions relating to orders = 10		In-chambers opinions = 0
Unanimous opinions: 2		Most joined by: Alito (13 in full, 1 in part)		Least joined by: Scalia, Ginsburg (4)

Type	Case	Citation	Issues	Joined by	Other opinions
	New Hampshire Right to Life v. Department of Health and Human Services	577 U.S. ___ (2015)	Freedom of Information Act	Scalia	
Thomas dissented from the Court's denial of certiorari.
	Friedman v. Highland Park	577 U.S. ___ (2015)	Second Amendment • right to keep and bear arms • municipal ban on semiautomatic firearms and high-capacity magazines	Scalia	
Thomas dissented from the Court's denial of certiorari.
	DIRECTV, Inc. v. Imburgia	577 U.S. ___ (2015)	Federal Arbitration Act		Breyer; Ginsburg
	Montanile v. Board of Trustees of Nat. Elevator Industry Health Benefit Plan	577 U.S. ___ (2016)	Employee Retirement Income Security Act of 1974 • equitable remedies for plan enforcement	Roberts, Scalia, Kennedy, Breyer, Sotomayor, Kagan; Alito (in part)	Ginsburg
	Campbell-Ewald v. Gomez	577 U.S. ___ (2016)	Article III • Case or Controversy Clause • effect of unaccepted settlement offer or offer of judgment on mootness • Telephone Consumer Protection Act • liability of federal contractor		Ginsburg; Roberts; Alito
	Montgomery v. Louisiana	577 U.S. ___ (2016)	Eighth Amendment • mandatory life imprisonment of minors • retroactivity of new constitutional rules		Kennedy; Scalia
	Musacchio v. United States	577 U.S. ___ (2016)	challenge to sufficiency of evidence based on incorrect jury instructions • waiver of statute of limitations	Unanimous	
	California Building Industry Assn. v. San Jose	577 U.S. ___ (2016)	ordinance requiring new developments include low income housing • Fifth Amendment • Takings Clause		
Thomas concurred in the Court's denial of certiorari.
	Gobeille v. Liberty Mut. Ins. Co.	577 U.S. ___ (2016)	Employee Retirement Income Security Act of 1974 • preemption of state law health care disclosure requirements		Kennedy; Breyer; Ginsburg
	American Freedom Defense Initiative v. King County	577 U.S. ___ (2016)	First Amendment • free speech • public forum doctrine • advertising in public transit areas	Alito	
Thomas dissented from the Court's denial of certiorari.
	Nebraska v. Colorado	577 U.S. ___ (2016)	discretion to decline original jurisdiction suits • Colorado Amendment 64	Alito	
Thomas dissented from the Court's denial of leave to file complaint.
	Tyson Foods, Inc. v. Bouaphakeo	577 U.S. ___ (2016)	Fair Labor Standards Act of 1938 • certification of class action • compensibility for varying times spent donning and doffing protective gear	Alito	Kennedy; Roberts
	Nebraska v. Parker	577 U.S. ___ (2016)	Omaha Indian Reservation • diminishment of reservation boundaries	Unanimous	
	Luis v. United States	578 U.S. ___ (2016)	pretrial asset freezing • Sixth Amendment • right to counsel of one's choice		Breyer; Kennedy; Kagan
	Evenwel v. Abbott	578 U.S. ___ (2016)	legislative redistricting based on total state population • Fourteenth Amendment • Equal Protection Clause • one person, one vote doctrine		Ginsburg; Alito
	Kakarala v. Wells Fargo Bank, N. A.	578 U.S. ___ (2016)	federal court review of orders remanding cases to state court		
Thomas dissented from the Court's denial of certiorari.
	Welch v. United States	578 U.S. ___ (2016)	Armed Career Criminal Act • retroactive effect of court decision on collateral review		Kennedy
	Hughes v. Talen Energy Marketing, LLC	578 U.S. ___ (2016)	Federal Power Act • interstate wholesale electricity rates • federal preemption		Ginsburg; Sotomayor
	Arrigoni Enterprises, LLC. v. Durham	578 U.S. ___ (2016)	Fifth Amendment • Takings Clause • exhaustion of remedies under state procedures	Kennedy	
Thomas dissented from the Court's denial of certiorari.
	Heffernan v. City of Paterson	578 U.S. ___ (2016)	First Amendment • free speech by government employees • demotion based on employer's factual mistake regarding engagement in protected activity	Alito	Breyer
	Ocasio v. United States	578 U.S. ___ (2016)	Hobbs Act • conspiracy		Alito; Breyer; Sotomayor
	Spokeo, Inc. v. Robins	578 U.S. ___ (2016)	Fair Credit Reporting Act of 1970 • Article III • injury-in-fact		Alito; Ginsburg
	Husky Int'l Electronics, Inc. v. Ritz	578 U.S. ___ (2016)	bankruptcy law • Chapter 7 • discharge exception for actual fraud		Sotomayor
	Merrill Lynch, Pierce, Fenner & Smith Inc. v. Manning	578 U.S. ___ (2016)	Securities Exchange Act of 1934 • removal jurisdiction • federal question jurisdiction	Sotomayor	Kagan
	United Student Aid Funds, Inc. v. Bible	578 U.S. ___ (2016)	administrative law • deference to agency interpretation		
Thomas dissented from the denial of certiorari.
	CRST Van Expedited, Inc. v. EEOC	578 U.S. ___ (2016)	Title VII • award of attorney's fees to prevailing party		Kennedy
	Betterman v. Montana	578 U.S. ___ (2016)	Sixth Amendment • Speedy Trial Clause • postconviction delay in sentencing	Alito	Ginsburg; Sotomayor
	Foster v. Chatman	578 U.S. ___ (2016)	Fourteenth Amendment • Equal Protection Clause • racial discrimination in juror peremptory challenges • adequate and independent state ground		Roberts; Alito
	Green v. Brennan	578 U.S. ___ (2016)	Title VII • constructive discharge • statute of limitations		Sotomayor; Alito
	Adams v. Alabama	578 U.S. ___ (2016)	Eighth Amendment • mandatory life imprisonment of minors • retroactivity of new constitutional rules	Alito	Alito; Sotomayor
Thomas concurred in the Court's decision to grant certiorari, vacate the lower court's opinion, and remand.
	Lynch v. Arizona	578 U.S. ___ (2016)	Fourteenth Amendment • Due Process Clause • death penalty • right to inform jury at sentencing of parole ineligibility	Alito	per curiam
	Ross v. Blake	578 U.S. ___ (2016)	Prison Litigation Reform Act of 1995 • exhaustion of remedies		Kagan; Breyer
	Williams v. Pennsylvania	579 U.S. ___ (2016)	Fourteenth Amendment • Due Process Clause • judicial recusal due to prior involvement as prosecutor		Kennedy; Roberts
	Dietz v. Bouldin	579 U.S. ___ (2016)	district court recall of jury in civil case after discharge	Kennedy	Sotomayor
	Puerto Rico v. Sanchez Valle	579 U.S. ___ (2016)	Double Jeopardy Clause • sovereignty of Puerto Rico		Kagan; Ginsburg; Breyer
	Puerto Rico v. Franklin Cal. Tax-Free Trust	579 U.S. ___ (2016)	bankruptcy law • preemption of municipal bankruptcy laws • Puerto Rican government-debt crisis	Roberts, Kennedy, Breyer, Kagan	Sotomayor
	United States v. Bryant	579 U.S. ___ (2016)	federal crime of domestic violence in Indian lands • tribal court conviction as predicate offense • Indian Civil Rights Act of 1968 • Sixth Amendment • Assistance of Counsel Clause • Fifth Amendment • Due Process Clause		Ginsburg
	Kingdomware Technologies, Inc. v. United States	579 U.S. ___ (2016)	Veterans Benefits, Health Care, and Information Technology Act of 2006 • Department of Defense contracting with veteran-owned small businesses	Unanimous	
	Universal Health Services, Inc. v. United States ex rel. Escobar	579 U.S. ___ (2016)	False Claims Act • implied false certification theory • failure to disclose noncompliance with legal requirements	Unanimous	
	Encino Motorcars, LLC v. Navarro	579 U.S. ___ (2016)	Fair Labor Standards Act • overtime exemption for automobile service advisors	Alito	Kennedy; Ginsburg
	Utah v. Strieff	579 U.S. ___ (2016)	Fourth Amendment • exclusionary rule • attenuation doctrine	Roberts, Kennedy, Breyer, Alito	Sotomayor; Kagan
	Cuozzo Speed Technologies, LLC v. Lee	579 U.S. ___ (2016)	Leahy-Smith America Invents Act • appealability of decision to conduct inter partes review		Breyer; Alito
	Taylor v. United States	579 U.S. ___ (2016)	Hobbs Act • robbery of drug dealers as satisfaction of commerce requirement		Alito
	Fisher v. University of Tex. at Austin	579 U.S. ___ (2016)	Fourteenth Amendment • Equal Protection Clause • affirmative action • race-conscious college admissions program		Kennedy; Alito
	Birchfield v. North Dakota	579 U.S. ___ (2016)	Fourth Amendment • search incident to arrest • drunk driving • implied consent to breathalyzer or blood alcohol content tests		Alito; Sotomayor
	Mathis v. United States	579 U.S. ___ (2016)	Armed Career Criminal Act • sentence enhancement for prior convictions		Kagan; Kennedy; Breyer; Alito
	Whole Woman's Health v. Hellerstedt	579 U.S. ___ (2016)	Fourteenth Amendment • abortion • regulation of abortion providers • Texas Senate Bill 5 • res judicata		Breyer; Ginsburg; Alito
	Voisine v. United States	579 U.S. ___ (2016)	federal criminal law • prohibition on firearm ownership for misdemeanor domestic violence conviction • Second Amendment	Sotomayor (in part)	Kagan
	Delaware Strong Families v. Denn	579 U.S. ___ (2016)	First Amendment • campaign finance reform • mandated disclosure of anonymous donors		
Thomas dissented from the Court's denial of certiorari.
