= 2015 term United States Supreme Court opinions of Ruth Bader Ginsburg =

2015 opinions of Associate Justice Ruth Bader Ginsburg's tenure on the Court (US)

The 2015 term of the Supreme Court of the United States began October 5, 2015, and concluded October 2, 2016. This was the twenty-third term of Associate Justice Ruth Bader Ginsburg's tenure on the Court.
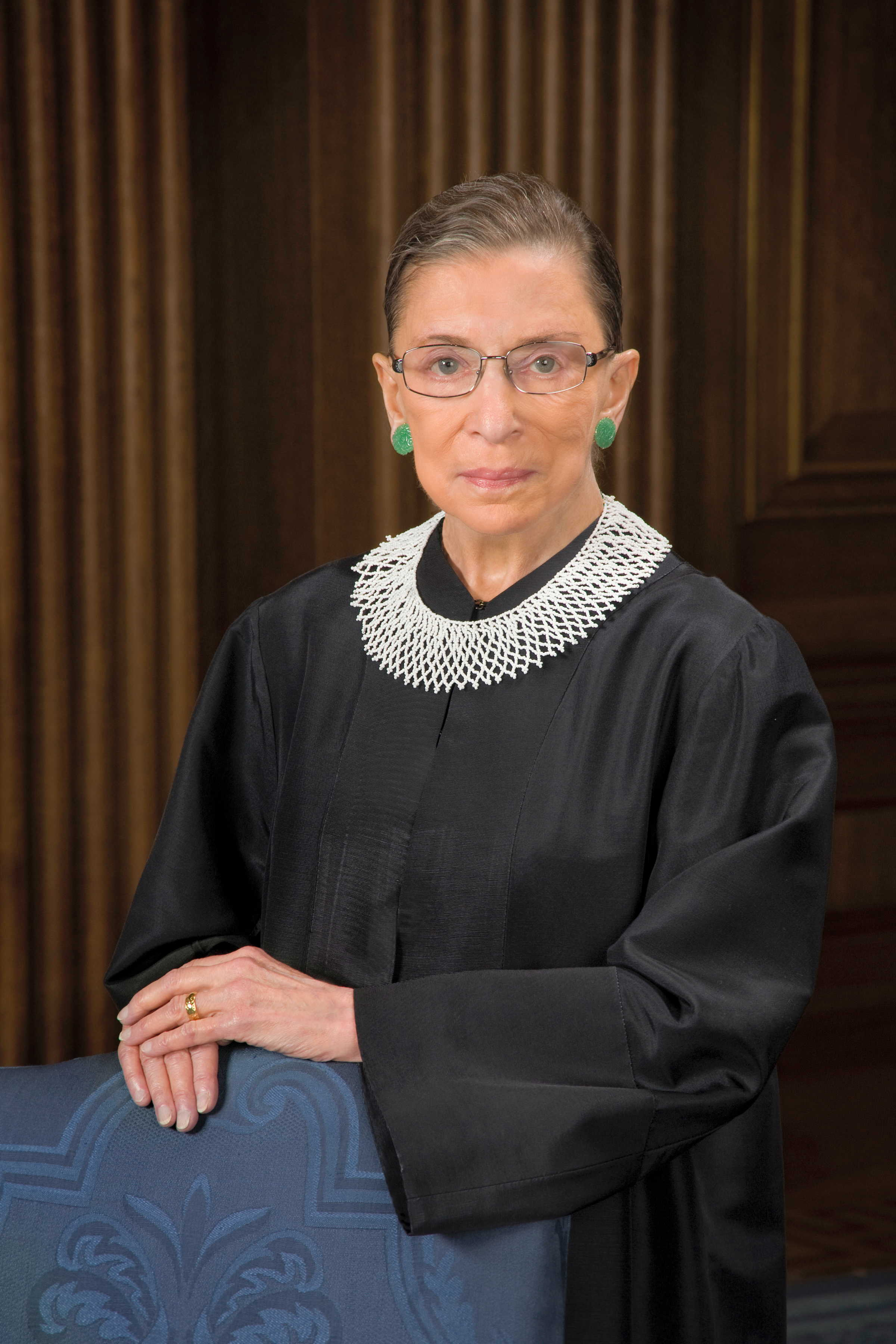

Ruth Bader Ginsburg 2015 term statistics

8	Majority or plurality	5	Concurrence	0	Other
4	Dissent	1	Concurrence/dissent	Total =	18
Bench opinions = 17		Opinions relating to orders = 1		In-chambers opinions = 0
Unanimous opinions: 3		Most joined by: Sotomayor (12)		Least joined by: Scalia (1)

Type	Case	Citation	Issues	Joined by	Other opinions
	DIRECTV, Inc. v. Imburgia	577 U.S. 59 (2015)	Federal Arbitration Act	Sotomayor	Breyer; Thomas
	Bruce v. Samuels	577 U.S. 82 (2016)	Prison Litigation Reform Act of 1995 • filing fees for in forma pauperis litigants	Unanimous	
	Montanile v. Board of Trustees of Nat. Elevator Industry Health Benefit Plan	577 U.S. 151 (2016)	Employee Retirement Income Security Act of 1974 • equitable remedies for plan enforcement		Thomas
	Campbell-Ewald v. Gomez	577 U.S. 153 (2016)	Article III • Case or Controversy Clause • effect of unaccepted settlement offer or offer of judgment on mootness • Telephone Consumer Protection Act • liability of federal contractor	Kennedy, Breyer, Sotomayor, Kagan	Thomas; Roberts; Alito
	Gobeille v. Liberty Mut. Ins. Co.	577 U.S. 332 (2016)	Employee Retirement Income Security Act of 1974 • preemption of state law health care disclosure requirements	Sotomayor	Kennedy; Thomas; Breyer
	Evenwel v. Abbott	578 U.S. 57 (2016)	legislative redistricting based on total state population • Fourteenth Amendment • Equal Protection Clause • one person, one vote doctrine	Roberts, Kennedy, Breyer, Sotomayor, Kagan	Thomas; Alito
	Hughes v. Talen Energy Marketing, LLC	578 U.S. 150 (2016)	Federal Power Act • interstate wholesale electricity rates • federal preemption	Roberts, Kennedy, Breyer, Alito, Sotomayor, Kagan	Thomas; Sotomayor
	Bank Markazi v. Peterson	578 U.S. 212 (2016)	Iran Threat Reduction and Syria Human Rights Act of 2012 • domestic suits by victims of state-sponsored terrorism • case-specific legislative designation of state assets for judgment execution • separation of powers • Article III	Kennedy, Breyer, Alito, Kagan; Thomas (in part)	Roberts
	Sheriff v. Gillie	578 U.S. 317 (2016)	Fair Debt Collection Practices Act • special counsel use of state attorney general letterhead	Unanimous	
	Spokeo, Inc. v. Robins	578 U.S. 349 (2016)	Fair Credit Reporting Act of 1970 • Article III • injury-in-fact	Sotomayor	Alito; Thomas
	Betterman v. Montana	578 U.S. 437 (2016)	Sixth Amendment • Speedy Trial Clause • postconviction delay in sentencing	Unanimous	Thomas; Sotomayor
	Army Corps of Engineers v. Hawkes Co.	578 U.S. 604 (2016)	Clean Water Act • United States Army Corps of Engineers jurisdictional determination • Administrative Procedure Act reviewability		Roberts; Kennedy; Kagan
	Puerto Rico v. Sanchez Valle	579 U.S. 78 (2016)	Double Jeopardy Clause • sovereignty of Puerto Rico	Thomas	Kagan; Thomas; Breyer
	United States v. Bryant	579 U.S. 140 (2016)	federal crime of domestic violence in Indian lands • tribal court conviction as predicate offense • Indian Civil Rights Act of 1968 • Sixth Amendment • Assistance of Counsel Clause • Fifth Amendment • Due Process Clause	Unanimous	Thomas
	Encino Motorcars, LLC v. Navarro	579 U.S. 225 (2016)	Fair Labor Standards Act • overtime exemption for automobile service advisors	Sotomayor	Kennedy; Thomas
	RJR Nabisco, Inc. v. European Community	579 U.S. 355 (2016)	Racketeer Influenced and Corrupt Organizations Act • extraterritorial application	Breyer, Kagan	Alito; Breyer
	Williams v. Louisiana	579 U.S. 911 (2016)	Fourteenth Amendment • Equal Protection Clause • racial discrimination in juror peremptory challenges • judge-supplied race-neutral reason for challenge	Breyer, Sotomayor, Kagan	Alito
Ginsburg concurred in the Court's order to grant, vacate, and remand.
	Whole Woman's Health v. Hellerstedt	579 U.S. 627 (2016)	Fourteenth Amendment • abortion • regulation of abortion providers • Texas Senate Bill 5 • res judicata		Breyer; Thomas; Alito
