= 2015 term United States Supreme Court opinions of Samuel Alito =

The 2015 term of the Supreme Court of the United States began October 5, 2015, and concluded October 2, 2016. This was the eleventh term of Associate Justice Samuel Alito's tenure on the Court.
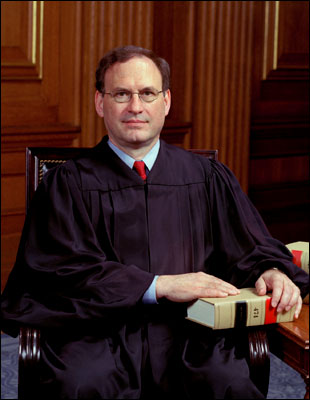

Samuel Alito 2015 term statistics

7	Majority or plurality	7	Concurrence	0	Other
10	Dissent	1	Concurrence/dissent	Total =	25
Bench opinions = 19		Opinions relating to orders = 6		In-chambers opinions = 0
Unanimous opinions: 2		Most joined by: Thomas (14 in full, 1 in part)		Least joined by: Scalia (1)

Type	Case	Citation	Issues	Joined by	Other opinions
	Hurst v. Florida	577 U.S. ___ (2016)	death penalty • Sixth Amendment • right to a jury trial • judicial factfinding of aggravating circumstances after jury advisory recommendation		Sotomayor; Breyer
	Campbell-Ewald v. Gomez	577 U.S. ___ (2016)	Article III • Case or Controversy Clause • effect of unaccepted settlement offer or offer of judgment on mootness • Telephone Consumer Protection Act • liability of federal contractor		Ginsburg; Thomas; Roberts
	Menominee Tribe of Wis. v. United States	577 U.S. ___ (2016)	Indian Self-Determination and Education Assistance Act • Contract Disputes Act of 1978 • equitable tolling of statute of limitations	Unanimous	
	Taylor v. Yee	577 U.S. ___ (2016)	notification and length of state law escheat periods • Fourteenth Amendment • Due Process Clause	Thomas	
Alito concurred in the Court's denial of certiorari.
	Ben-Levi v. Brown	577 U.S. ___ (2016)	Religious Land Use and Institutionalized Persons Act of 2000 • First Amendment • Free Exercise Clause • prison denial of inmate request for group prayer		
Alito dissented from the Court's denial of certiorari.
	Wearry v. Cain	577 U.S. ___ (2016)	Due Process Clause • obligation of prosecution to turn over exculpatory evidence	Thomas	per curiam
	Caetano v. Massachusetts	577 U.S. ___ (2016)	Second Amendment • prohibition on stun gun ownership	Thomas	per curiam
	Evenwel v. Abbott	578 U.S. ___ (2016)	legislative redistricting based on total state population • Fourteenth Amendment • Equal Protection Clause • one person, one vote doctrine	Thomas (in part)	Ginsburg; Thomas
	Nichols v. United States	578 U.S. ___ (2016)	Sex Offender Registration and Notification Act • change of residence registration requirements	Unanimous	
	Molina-Martinez v. United States	578 U.S. ___ (2016)	Federal Sentencing Guidelines • sentencing based on incorrect range	Thomas	Kennedy
	Ocasio v. United States	578 U.S. ___ (2016)	Hobbs Act • conspiracy	Kennedy, Ginsburg, Breyer, Kagan	Breyer; Thomas; Sotomayor
	Spokeo, Inc. v. Robins	578 U.S. ___ (2016)	Fair Credit Reporting Act of 1970 • Article III • injury-in-fact	Roberts, Kennedy, Thomas, Breyer, Kagan	Thomas; Ginsburg
	Foster v. Chatman	578 U.S. ___ (2016)	Fourteenth Amendment • Equal Protection Clause • racial discrimination in juror peremptory challenges • adequate and independent state ground		Roberts; Thomas
	Green v. Brennan	578 U.S. ___ (2016)	Title VII • constructive discharge • statute of limitations		Sotomayor; Thomas
	Adams v. Alabama	578 U.S. ___ (2016)	Eighth Amendment • mandatory life imprisonment of minors • retroactivity of new constitutional rules	Thomas	Thomas; Sotomayor
Alito concurred in the Court's decision to grant certiorari, vacate the lower court's opinion, and remand.
	Cuozzo Speed Technologies, LLC v. Lee	579 U.S. ___ (2016)	Leahy-Smith America Invents Act • appealability of decision to conduct inter partes review	Sotomayor	Breyer; Thomas
	Taylor v. United States	579 U.S. ___ (2016)	Hobbs Act • robbery of drug dealers as satisfaction of commerce requirement	Roberts, Kennedy, Ginsburg, Breyer, Sotomayor, Kagan	Thomas
	RJR Nabisco, Inc. v. European Community	579 U.S. ___ (2016)	Racketeer Influenced and Corrupt Organizations Act • extraterritorial application	Roberts, Kennedy, Thomas; Ginsburg, Breyer, Kagan (in part)	Ginsburg; Breyer
	Williams v. Louisiana	579 U.S. ___ (2016)	Fourteenth Amendment • Equal Protection Clause • racial discrimination in juror peremptory challenges • judge-supplied race-neutral reason for challenge	Thomas	Ginsburg
Alito dissented from the Court's order to grant, vacate, and remand.
	Flowers v. Mississippi	579 U.S. ___ (2016)	Fourteenth Amendment • Equal Protection Clause • racial discrimination in juror peremptory challenges • GVR orders	Thomas	
Alito dissented from the Court's order to grant, vacate, and remand.
	Fisher v. University of Tex. at Austin	579 U.S. ___ (2016)	Fourteenth Amendment • Equal Protection Clause • affirmative action • race-conscious college admissions program	Roberts, Thomas	Kennedy; Thomas
	Birchfield v. North Dakota	579 U.S. ___ (2016)	Fourth Amendment • search incident to arrest • drunk driving • implied consent to breathalyzer or blood alcohol content tests	Roberts, Kennedy, Breyer, Kagan	Thomas; Sotomayor
	Mathis v. United States	579 U.S. ___ (2016)	Armed Career Criminal Act • sentence enhancement for prior convictions		Kagan; Kennedy; Thomas; Breyer
	Whole Woman's Health v. Hellerstedt	579 U.S. ___ (2016)	Fourteenth Amendment • abortion • regulation of abortion providers • Texas Senate Bill 5 • res judicata	Roberts, Thomas	Breyer; Ginsburg; Thomas
	Stormans, Inc. v. Wiesman	579 U.S. ___ (2016)	First Amendment • Free Exercise Clause • religious objection by pharmacist to dispensing emergency contraceptives	Roberts, Thomas	
Alito dissented from the Court's denial of certiorari.
