= 2015 term United States Supreme Court opinions of Stephen Breyer =

The 2015 term of the Supreme Court of the United States began October 5, 2015, and concluded October 2, 2016. This was the twenty-second term of Associate Justice Stephen Breyer's tenure on the Court.
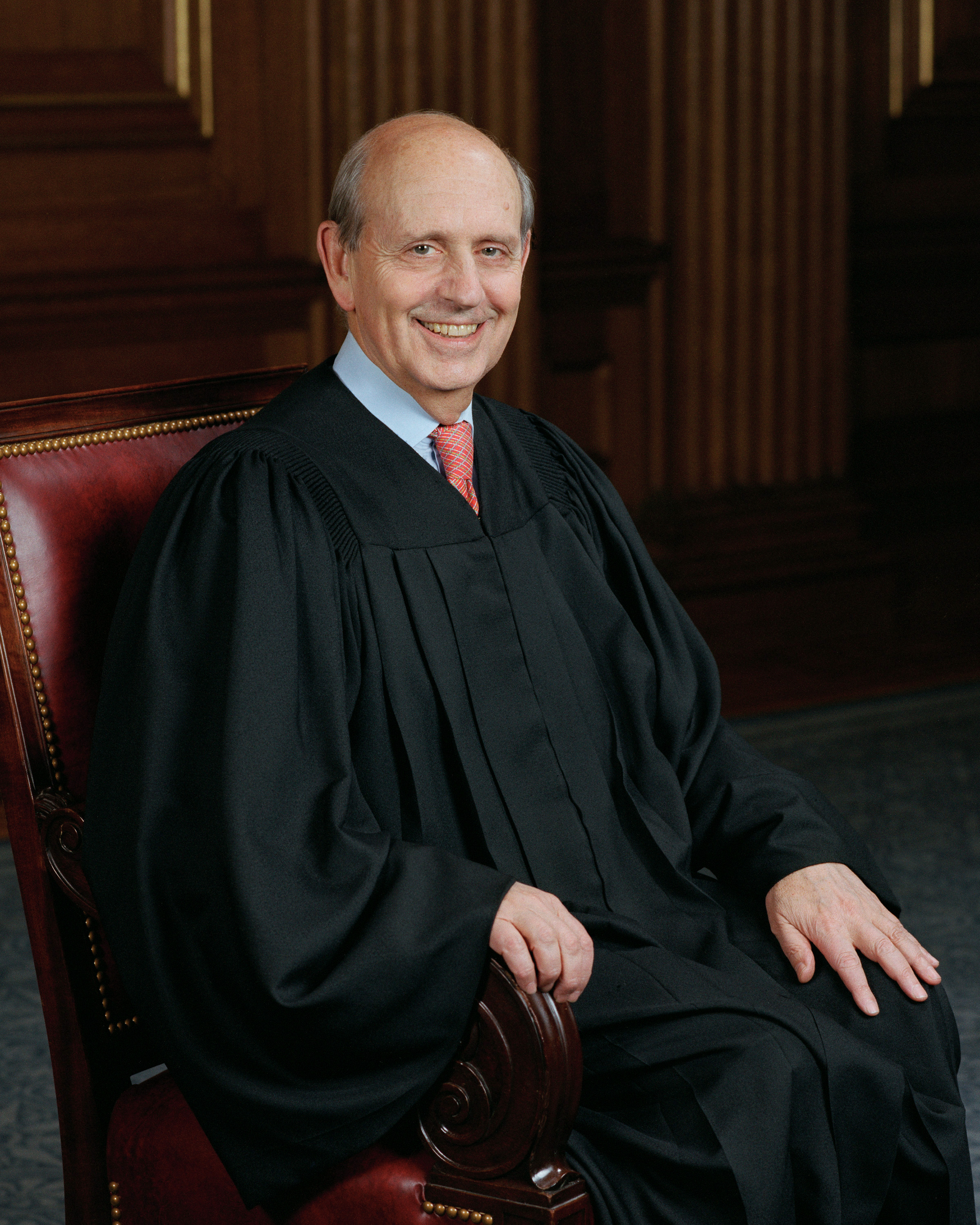

Stephen Breyer 2015 term statistics

| 8 | Majority or plurality | 6 | Concurrence | 0 | Other |
| 8 | Dissent | 1 | Concurrence/dissent | Total = | 23 |
| Bench opinions = 16 | | Opinions relating to orders = 7 | | In-chambers opinions = 0 |
| Unanimous opinions: 2 | | Most joined by: Ginsburg (9) | | Least joined by: Scalia (1) |

| Type | Case | Citation | Issues | Joined by | Other opinions |
|---|---|---|---|---|---|
| | Correll v. Florida | 577 U.S. ___ (2015) | Eighth Amendment • death penalty | | Sotomayor |
Breyer dissented from the Court's denial of certiorari and application for stay of execution.
| | DIRECTV, Inc. v. Imburgia | 577 U.S. ___ (2015) | Federal Arbitration Act | Roberts, Scalia, Kennedy, Alito, Kagan | Thomas; Ginsburg |
| | Hurst v. Florida | 577 U.S. ___ (2016) | death penalty • Sixth Amendment • right to a jury trial • judicial factfinding of aggravating circumstances after jury advisory recommendation | | Sotomayor; Alito |
| | Brooks v. Alabama | 577 U.S. ___ (2016) | death penalty | | Sotomayor |
Breyer dissented from the Court's denial of a stay of execution and a petition for certiorari.
| | Gobeille v. Liberty Mut. Ins. Co. | 577 U.S. ___ (2016) | Employee Retirement Income Security Act of 1974 • preemption of state law health care disclosure requirements | | Kennedy; Thomas; Ginsburg |
| | Luis v. United States | 578 U.S. ___ (2016) | pretrial asset freezing • Sixth Amendment • right to counsel of one's choice | Roberts, Ginsburg, Sotomayor | Thomas; Kennedy; Kagan |
| | Franchise Tax Bd. of Cal. v. Hyatt | 578 U.S. ___ (2016) | taxpayer lawsuit against State in court of another State • Full Faith and Credit Clause | Kennedy, Ginsburg, Sotomayor, Kagan | Roberts |
| | Harris v. Arizona Independent Redistricting Comm'n | 578 U.S. ___ (2016) | legislative redistricting • Voting Rights Act • Fourteenth Amendment • Equal Protection Clause | Unanimous | |
| | Heffernan v. City of Paterson | 578 U.S. ___ (2016) | First Amendment • free speech by government employees • demotion based on employer's factual mistake regarding engagement in protected activity | Roberts, Kennedy, Ginsburg, Sotomayor, Kagan | Thomas |
| | Ocasio v. United States | 578 U.S. ___ (2016) | Hobbs Act • conspiracy | | Alito; Thomas; Sotomayor |
| | Boyer v. Davis | 578 U.S. ___ (2016) | Eighth Amendment • death penalty • decades-long delay in carrying out execution | | |
Breyer dissented from the Court's denial of certiorari.
| | Wittman v. Personhuballah | 578 U.S. ___ (2016) | legislative redistricting • Article III • standing | Unanimous | |
| | Tucker v. Louisiana | 578 U.S. ___ (2016) | Eighth Amendment • death penalty | Ginsburg | |
Breyer dissented from the Court's denial of certiorari.
| | Ross v. Blake | 578 U.S. ___ (2016) | Prison Litigation Reform Act of 1995 • exhaustion of remedies | | Kagan; Thomas |
| | Puerto Rico v. Sanchez Valle | 579 U.S. ___ (2016) | Double Jeopardy Clause • sovereignty of Puerto Rico | Sotomayor | Kagan; Thomas; Ginsburg |
| | Halo Electronics, Inc. v. Pulse Electronics, Inc. | 579 U.S. ___ (2016) | patent law • Patent Act of 1952 • enhanced damages for infringement | Kennedy, Alito | Roberts |
| | Cuozzo Speed Technologies, LLC v. Lee | 579 U.S. ___ (2016) | Leahy-Smith America Invents Act • appealability of decision to conduct inter partes review | Roberts, Kennedy, Thomas, Ginsburg, Kagan; Alito, Sotomayor (in part) | Thomas; Alito |
| | RJR Nabisco, Inc. v. European Community | 579 U.S. ___ (2016) | Racketeer Influenced and Corrupt Organizations Act • extraterritorial application | | Alito; Ginsburg |
| | Mathis v. United States | 579 U.S. ___ (2016) | Armed Career Criminal Act • sentence enhancement for prior convictions | Ginsburg | Kagan; Kennedy; Thomas; Alito |
| | Whole Woman's Health v. Hellerstedt | 579 U.S. ___ (2016) | Fourteenth Amendment • abortion • regulation of abortion providers • Texas Senate Bill 5 • res judicata | Kennedy, Ginsburg, Sotomayor, Kagan | Ginsburg; Thomas; Alito |
| | Conner v. Sellers | 579 U.S. ___ (2016) | Eighth Amendment • death penalty • lengthy delay in carrying out execution | | |
Breyer dissented from the Court's denial of an application for a stay of execution and of certiorari.
| | Conner v. Sellers | 579 U.S. ___ (2016) | Eighth Amendment • death penalty • lengthy delay in carrying out execution | | |
Breyer dissented from the Court's denial of an application for a stay of execution and of certiorari.
| | Gloucester County School Board v. G. G. | 579 U.S. ___ (2016) | | | |
Breyer concurred in the Court's granting of a stay pending a petition for certiorari.
