= 2015 term United States Supreme Court opinions of Sonia Sotomayor =

The 2015 term of the Supreme Court of the United States began October 5, 2015, and concluded October 2, 2016. This was the seventh term of Associate Justice Sonia Sotomayor's tenure on the Court.
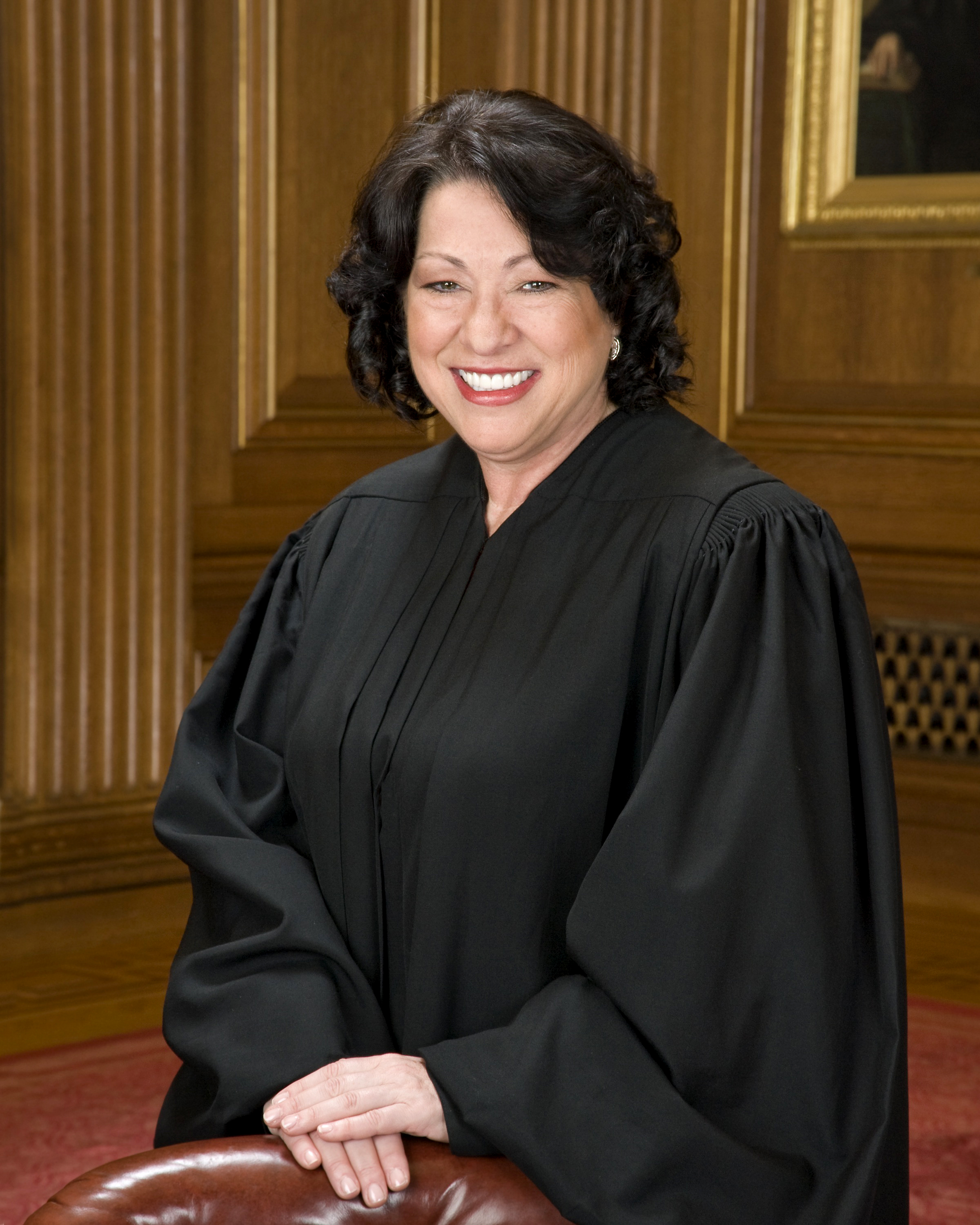

Sonia Sotomayor 2015 term statistics

7	Majority or plurality	5	Concurrence	1	Other
8	Dissent	1	Concurrence/dissent	Total =	22
Bench opinions = 18		Opinions relating to orders = 4		In-chambers opinions = 0
Unanimous opinions: 2		Most joined by: Ginsburg (13 in full, 1 in part)		Least joined by: Scalia (1)

Type	Case	Citation	Issues	Joined by	Other opinions
	Correll v. Florida	577 U.S. 948 (2015)	Eighth Amendment • death penalty		Breyer
Sotomayor dissented from the Court's denial of certiorari and application for stay of execution.
	Mullenix v. Luna	577 U.S. 20 (2015)	Fourth Amendment • use of deadly force in effecting arrest • qualified immunity		per curiam; Scalia
	Holiday v. Stephens	577 U.S. 999 (2015)	death penalty • appointment of counsel in clemency proceedings		
Sotomayor filed a statement respecting the Court's denial of certiorari.
	Hurst v. Florida	577 U.S. 92 (2016)	death penalty • Sixth Amendment • right to a jury trial • judicial factfinding of aggravating circumstances after jury advisory recommendation	Roberts, Scalia, Kennedy, Thomas, Ginsburg, Kagan	Breyer; Alito
	Kansas v. Carr	577 U.S. 127 (2016)	Eighth Amendment • death penalty • jury instructions on standard of proof for mitigating factors		Scalia
	Brooks v. Alabama	577 U.S. 1115 (2016)	death penalty	Ginsburg	Breyer
Sotomayor concurred in the Court's denial of a stay of execution and a petition for certiorari.
	Lockhart v. United States	577 U.S. 347 (2016)	federal child pornography laws • scope of sentence enhancement for prior convictions	Roberts, Kennedy, Thomas, Ginsburg, Alito	Kagan
	Americold Realty Trust v. ConAgra Foods, Inc.	577 U.S. 378 (2016)	diversity jurisdiction • citizenship of investment trust	Unanimous	
	Hughes v. Talen Energy Marketing, LLC	578 U.S. 167 (2016)	Federal Power Act • interstate wholesale electricity rates • federal preemption		Ginsburg; Thomas
	Ocasio v. United States	578 U.S. 306 (2016)	Hobbs Act • conspiracy	Roberts	Alito; Breyer; Thomas
	Husky Int'l Electronics, Inc. v. Ritz	578 U.S. 355 (2016)	bankruptcy law • Chapter 7 • discharge exception for actual fraud	Roberts, Kennedy, Ginsburg, Breyer, Alito, Kagan	Thomas
	Zubik v. Burwell	578 U.S. 410 (2016)	Affordable Care Act • contraceptive mandate • Religious Freedom Restoration Act of 1993	Ginsburg	per curiam
	Kernan v. Hinojosa	578 U.S. 416 (2016)	habeas corpus • state court unexplained denial of petition	Ginsburg	per curiam
	Betterman v. Montana	578 U.S. 450 (2016)	Sixth Amendment • Speedy Trial Clause • postconviction delay in sentencing		Ginsburg; Thomas
	Luna Torres v. Lynch	578 U.S. 473 (2016)	immigration law • removal for conviction of aggravated felony	Thomas, Breyer	Kagan
	Green v. Brennan	578 U.S. 547 (2016)	Title VII • constructive discharge • statute of limitations	Roberts, Kennedy, Ginsburg, Breyer, Kagan	Alito; Thomas
	Adams v. Alabama	578 U.S. 998 (2016)	Eighth Amendment • mandatory life imprisonment of minors • retroactivity of new constitutional rules	Ginsburg	Thomas; Alito
Sotomayor concurred in the Court's decision to grant certiorari, vacate the lower court's opinion, and remand.
	Simmons v. Himmelreich	578 U.S. 621 (2016)	Federal Tort Claims Act • exceptions for discretionary functions • judgment bar against subsequent suit against employees	Unanimous	
	Dietz v. Bouldin	579 U.S. 40 (2016)	district court recall of jury in civil case after discharge	Roberts, Ginsburg, Breyer, Alito, Kagan	Thomas
	Puerto Rico v. Franklin Cal. Tax-Free Trust	579 U.S. 131 (2016)	bankruptcy law • preemption of municipal bankruptcy laws • Puerto Rican government-debt crisis	Ginsburg	Thomas
	Utah v. Strieff	579 U.S. 243 (2016)	Fourth Amendment • exclusionary rule • attenuation doctrine	Ginsburg (in part)	Thomas; Kagan
	Birchfield v. North Dakota	579 U.S. 479 (2016)	Fourth Amendment • search incident to arrest • drunk driving • implied consent to breathalyzer or blood alcohol content tests	Ginsburg	Alito; Thomas
