= 2015 term United States Supreme Court opinions of Elena Kagan =

The 2015 term of the Supreme Court of the United States began October 5, 2015, and concluded October 2, 2016. This was the sixth term of Associate Justice Elena Kagan's tenure on the Court.
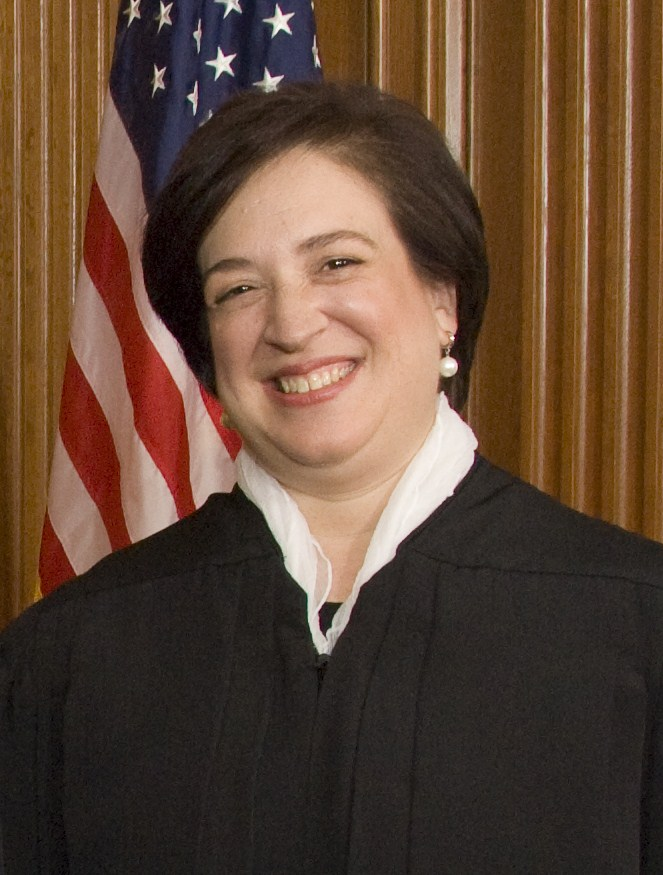

Elena Kagan 2015 term statistics

8	Majority or plurality	1	Concurrence	0	Other
3	Dissent	0	Concurrence/dissent	Total =	12
Bench opinions = 12		Opinions relating to orders = 0		In-chambers opinions = 0
Unanimous opinions: 1		Most joined by: Roberts, Kennedy, Ginsburg (8)		Least joined by: Scalia (0)

Type	Case	Citation	Issues	Joined by	Other opinions
	FERC v. Electric Power Supply Assn.	577 U.S. 260 (2016)	Federal Power Act • regulation of electricity market • Federal Energy Regulatory Commission Order No. 745	Roberts, Kennedy, Ginsburg, Breyer, Sotomayor	Scalia
	Lockhart v. United States	577 U.S. 362 (2016)	federal child pornography laws • scope of sentence enhancement for prior convictions	Breyer	Sotomayor
	Luis v. United States	578 U.S. 51 (2016)	pretrial asset freezing • Sixth Amendment • right to counsel of one's choice		Breyer; Thomas; Kennedy
	Merrill Lynch, Pierce, Fenner & Smith Inc. v. Manning	578 U.S. 374 (2016)	Securities Exchange Act of 1934 • removal jurisdiction • federal question jurisdiction	Roberts, Kennedy, Ginsburg, Breyer, Alito	Thomas
	Luna Torres v. Lynch	578 U.S. 452 (2016)	immigration law • removal for state conviction of aggravated felony	Roberts, Kennedy, Ginsburg, Alito	Sotomayor
	Army Corps of Engineers v. Hawkes Co.	578 U.S. 603 (2016)	Clean Water Act • United States Army Corps of Engineers jurisdictional determination • Administrative Procedure Act reviewability		Roberts; Kennedy; Ginsburg
	Ross v. Blake	578 U.S. 632 (2016)	Prison Litigation Reform Act of 1995 • exhaustion of remedies	Roberts, Kennedy, Ginsburg, Alito, Sotomayor	Thomas; Breyer
	Puerto Rico v. Sanchez Valle	579 U.S. 59 (2016)	Double Jeopardy Clause • sovereignty of Puerto Rico	Roberts, Kennedy, Ginsburg, Alito	Thomas; Ginsburg; Breyer
	Kirtsaeng v. John Wiley & Sons, Inc.	579 U.S. 197 (2016)	copyright law • award of attorney's fees	Unanimous	
	Utah v. Strieff	579 U.S. 255 (2016)	Fourth Amendment • exclusionary rule • attenuation doctrine	Ginsburg	Thomas; Sotomayor
	Mathis v. United States	579 U.S. 500 (2016)	Armed Career Criminal Act • sentence enhancement for prior convictions	Roberts, Kennedy, Thomas, Sotomayor	Kennedy; Thomas; Breyer; Alito
	Voisine v. United States	579 U.S. 686 (2016)	federal criminal law • prohibition on firearm ownership for misdemeanor domestic violence conviction	Roberts, Kennedy, Ginsburg, Breyer, Alito	Thomas
