= 2015 term United States Supreme Court opinions of Anthony Kennedy =

The 2015 term of the Supreme Court of the United States began October 5, 2015, and concluded October 2, 2016. This was the twenty-ninth term of Associate Justice Anthony Kennedy's tenure on the Court.
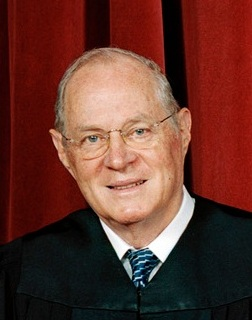

Anthony Kennedy 2015 term statistics

9	Majority or plurality	2	Concurrence	0	Other
1	Dissent	0	Concurrence/dissent	Total =	12
Bench opinions = 12		Opinions relating to orders = 0		In-chambers opinions = 0
Unanimous opinions: 1		Most joined by: Breyer (9)		Least joined by: Scalia (0)

Type	Case	Citation	Issues	Joined by	Other opinions
	Montgomery v. Louisiana	577 U.S. ___ (2016)	Eighth Amendment • mandatory life imprisonment of minors • retroactivity of new constitutional rules	Roberts, Ginsburg, Breyer, Sotomayor, Kagan	Scalia; Thomas
	Gobeille v. Liberty Mut. Ins. Co.	577 U.S. ___ (2016)	Employee Retirement Income Security Act of 1974 • preemption of state law health care disclosure requirements	Roberts, Thomas, Breyer, Alito, Kagan	Thomas; Breyer; Ginsburg
	Tyson Foods, Inc. v. Bouaphakeo	577 U.S. ___ (2016)	Fair Labor Standards Act of 1938 • certification of class action • compensibility for varying times spent donning and doffing protective gear	Roberts, Ginsburg, Breyer, Sotomayor, Kagan	Roberts; Thomas
	Luis v. United States	578 U.S. ___ (2016)	pretrial asset freezing • Sixth Amendment • right to counsel of one's choice	Alito	Breyer; Thomas; Kagan
	Welch v. United States	578 U.S. ___ (2016)	Armed Career Criminal Act • retroactive effect of court decision on collateral review	Roberts, Ginsburg, Breyer, Alito, Sotomayor, Kagan	Thomas
	Molina-Martinez v. United States	578 U.S. ___ (2016)	Federal Sentencing Guidelines • sentencing based on incorrect range	Roberts, Ginsburg, Breyer, Sotomayor, Kagan	Alito
	CRST Van Expedited, Inc. v. EEOC	578 U.S. ___ (2016)	Title VII • award of attorney's fees to prevailing party	Unanimous	Thomas
	Army Corps of Engineers v. Hawkes Co.	578 U.S. ___ (2016)	Clean Water Act • United States Army Corps of Engineers jurisdictional determination • Administrative Procedure Act reviewability	Thomas, Alito	Roberts; Ginsburg; Kagan
	Williams v. Pennsylvania	579 U.S. ___ (2016)	Fourteenth Amendment • Due Process Clause • judicial recusal due to prior involvement as prosecutor	Ginsburg, Breyer, Sotomayor, Kagan	Roberts; Thomas
	Encino Motorcars, LLC v. Navarro	579 U.S. ___ (2016)	Fair Labor Standards Act • overtime exemption for automobile service advisors	Roberts, Ginsburg, Breyer, Sotomayor, Kagan	Ginsburg; Thomas
	Fisher v. University of Tex. at Austin	579 U.S. ___ (2016)	Fourteenth Amendment • Equal Protection Clause • affirmative action • race-conscious college admissions program	Ginsburg, Breyer, Sotomayor	Thomas; Alito
	Mathis v. United States	579 U.S. ___ (2016)	Armed Career Criminal Act • sentence enhancement for prior convictions		Kagan; Thomas; Breyer; Alito
