= 2015 term United States Supreme Court opinions of John Roberts =

The 2015 term of the Supreme Court of the United States began October 5, 2015, and concluded October 2, 2016. This was the eleventh term of Chief Justice John Roberts's tenure on the Court.
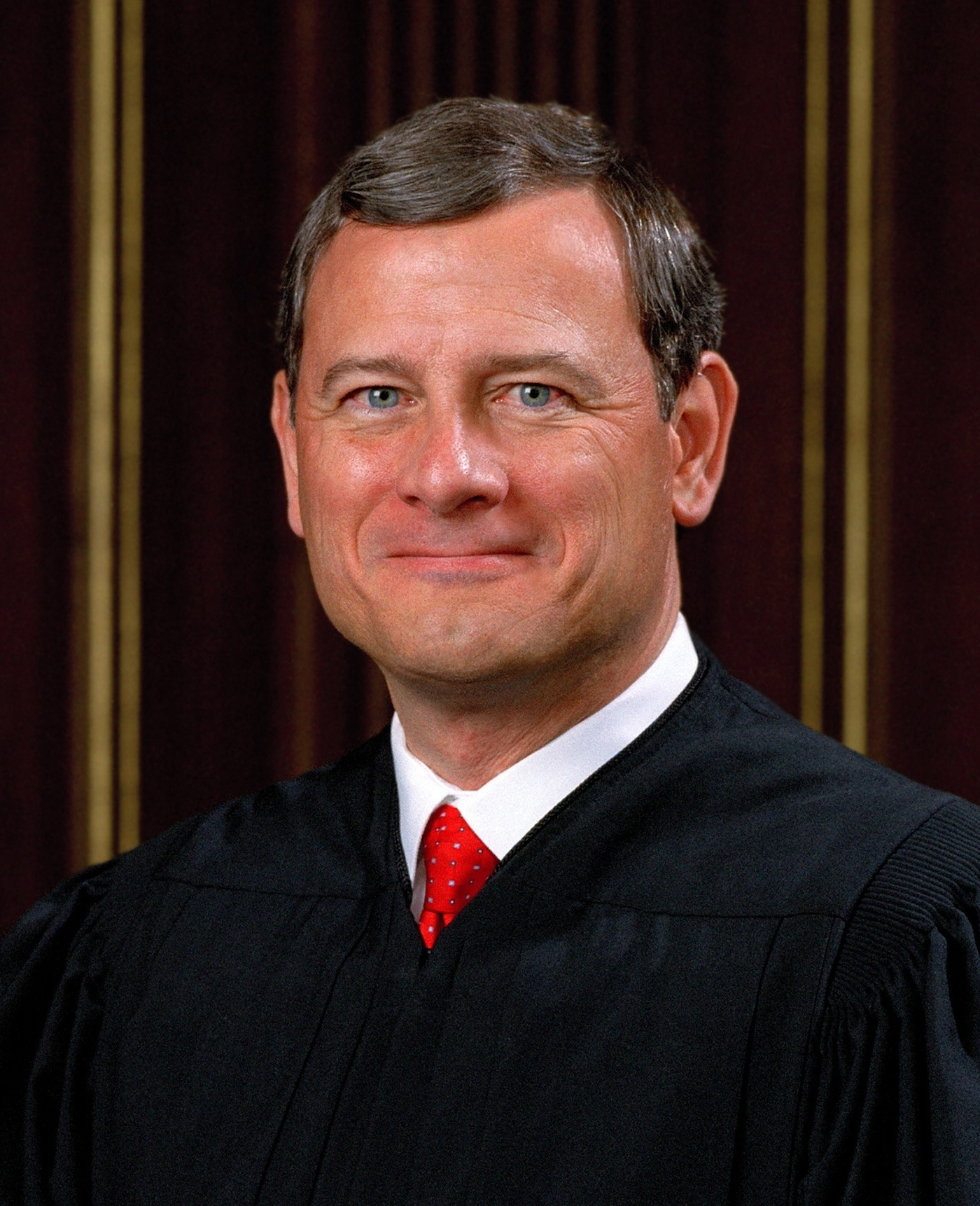

John Roberts 2015 term statistics

6	Majority or plurality	1	Concurrence	0	Other
4	Dissent	0	Concurrence/dissent	Total =	11
Bench opinions = 11		Opinions relating to orders = 0		In-chambers opinions = 0
Unanimous opinions: 4		Most joined by: Alito (7 in full, 1 in part)		Least joined by: Scalia (2)

Type	Case	Citation	Issues	Joined by	Other opinions
	OBB Personenverkehr AG v. Sachs	577 U.S. ___ (2015)	Foreign Sovereign Immunities Act • commercial activities exception	Unanimous	
	Campbell-Ewald v. Gomez	577 U.S. ___ (2016)	Article III • Case or Controversy Clause • effect of unaccepted settlement offer or offer of judgment on mootness • Telephone Consumer Protection Act • liability of federal contractor	Scalia, Alito	Ginsburg; Thomas; Alito
	Sturgeon v. Frost	577 U.S. ___ (2016)	Alaska National Interest Lands Conservation Act • authority to regulate waterway in conservation area	Unanimous	
	Tyson Foods, Inc. v. Bouaphakeo	577 U.S. ___ (2016)	Fair Labor Standards Act of 1938 • certification of class action • compensibility for varying times spent donning and doffing protective gear	Alito (in part)	Kennedy; Thomas
	Franchise Tax Bd. of Cal. v. Hyatt	578 U.S. ___ (2016)	taxpayer lawsuit against State in court of another State • Full Faith and Credit Clause	Thomas	Breyer
	Bank Markazi v. Peterson	578 U.S. ___ (2016)	Iran Threat Reduction and Syria Human Rights Act of 2012 • domestic suits by victims of state-sponsored terrorism • case-specific legislative designation of state assets for judgment execution • separation of powers • Article III	Sotomayor	Ginsburg
	Foster v. Chatman	578 U.S. ___ (2016)	Fourteenth Amendment • Equal Protection Clause • racial discrimination in juror peremptory challenges • adequate and independent state ground	Kennedy, Ginsburg, Breyer, Sotomayor, Kagan	Alito; Thomas
	Army Corps of Engineers v. Hawkes Co.	578 U.S. ___ (2016)	Clean Water Act • United States Army Corps of Engineers jurisdictional determination • Administrative Procedure Act reviewability	Kennedy, Thomas, Breyer, Alito, Sotomayor, Kagan	Kennedy; Ginsburg; Kagan
	Williams v. Pennsylvania	579 U.S. ___ (2016)	Fourteenth Amendment • Due Process Clause • judicial recusal due to prior involvement as prosecutor	Alito	Kennedy; Thomas
	Halo Electronics, Inc. v. Pulse Electronics, Inc.	579 U.S. ___ (2016)	patent law • Patent Act of 1952 • enhanced damages for infringement	Unanimous	Breyer
	McDonnell v. United States	579 U.S. ___ (2016)	federal criminal law • bribery by public official in performance of official act • Hobbs Act • honest services fraud	Unanimous	
