= 2015 term United States Supreme Court opinions of Antonin Scalia =

The 2015 term of the Supreme Court of the United States began October 5, 2015, and concluded October 2, 2016. This was the thirtieth and final term of Associate Justice Antonin Scalia's tenure on the Court; Scalia died on February 13, 2016.
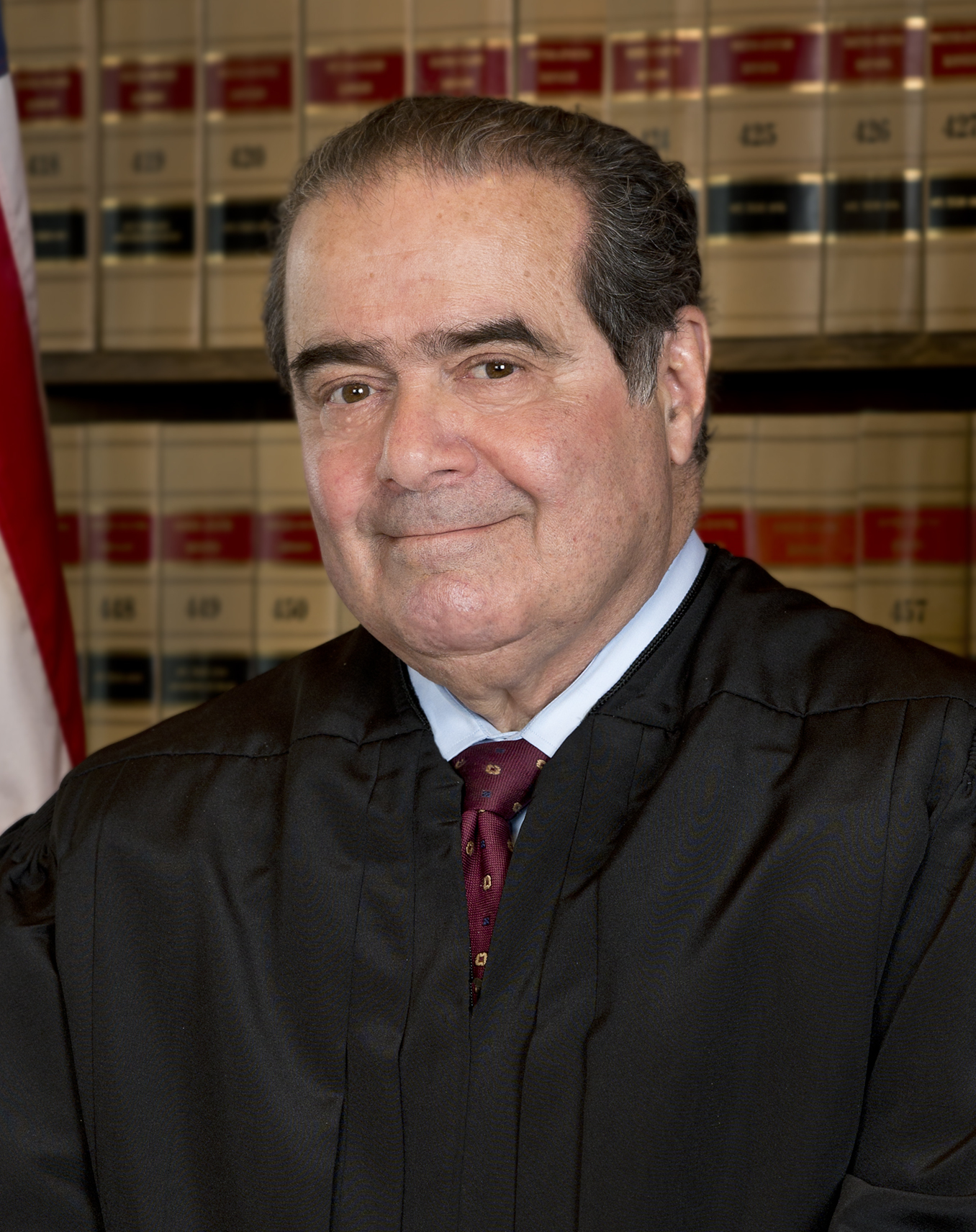

Antonin Scalia 2015 term statistics

2	Majority or plurality	1	Concurrence	0	Other
3	Dissent	0	Concurrence/dissent	Total =	6
Bench opinions = 5		Opinions relating to orders = 1		In-chambers opinions = 0
Unanimous opinions: 1		Most joined by: Thomas (5)		Least joined by: Sotomayor (1)

Type	Case	Citation	Issues	Joined by	Other opinions
	Mullenix v. Luna	577 U.S. ___ (2015)	Fourth Amendment • use of deadly force in effecting arrest • qualified immunity		per curiam; Sotomayor
	Rapelje v. Blackston	577 U.S. ___ (2015)	Sixth Amendment • Confrontation Clause • Antiterrorism and Effective Death Penalty Act of 1996	Thomas, Alito	
Scalia dissented from the Court's denial of certiorari.
	Shapiro v. McManus	577 U.S. ___ (2015)	congressional apportionment • three-judge panel review of constitutional challenges	Unanimous	
	Kansas v. Carr	577 U.S. ___ (2016)	Eighth Amendment • death penalty • jury instructions on standard of proof for mitigating factors	Roberts, Kennedy, Thomas, Ginsburg, Breyer, Alito, Kagan	Sotomayor
	Montgomery v. Louisiana	577 U.S. ___ (2016)	Eighth Amendment • mandatory life imprisonment of minors • retroactivity of new constitutional rules	Thomas, Alito	Kennedy; Thomas
	FERC v. Electric Power Supply Assn.	577 U.S. ___ (2016)	Federal Power Act • regulation of electricity market • Federal Energy Regulatory Commission Order No. 745	Thomas	Kagan
