= Dietz v. Bouldin =

- Supreme Court of the United States

Argued April 26, 2016 Decided June 9, 2016
- Full case name: Rocky Dietz, Petitioner v. Hillary Bouldin
- Docket no.: 15-458
- Citations: 579 U.S. ___ (more) 136 S. Ct. 1885; 195 L. Ed. 2d 161
- Opinion announcement: Opinion announcement

Holding
- A federal district court may rescind a discharge order and recall jurors for further service in the same case, but this power should be used cautiously. In this particular case, the judge did not abuse his authority. The judgment of the Ninth Circuit is affirmed.

Court membership
- Chief Justice John Roberts Associate Justices Anthony Kennedy · Clarence Thomas; Ruth Bader Ginsburg · Stephen Breyer; Samuel Alito · Sonia Sotomayor; Elena Kagan

Case opinions
- Majority: Sotomayor, joined by Roberts, Ginsburg, Breyer, Alito, Kagan
- Dissent: Thomas, joined by Kennedy

Dietz v. Bouldin, 579 U.S. 40 (2016), was a United States Supreme Court case in which the Court held that a federal district court may rescind a discharge order and recall jurors for further service in the same case.

== Background ==
Hillary Bouldin's vehicle collided with Rocky Dietz's in 2009 in Bozeman, Montana, and Dietz sued Bouldin for damages. Bouldin removed the case to a federal district court. During the trial, Bouldin admitted that he was negligent, and was willing to cover Dietz's medical expenses ($10,136). The point of contention was whether Dietz was entitled for more compensation. During the course of deliberation, the jury sent the judge a note whether the damages have been paid or is covered by someone else; after consulting with the lawyers in both sides, the judge informed the jury that the answer to that question does not matter. The jury ruled in favour of Dietz but awarded $0 in damages. The judge thanked and discharged the jury. However, minutes later, the judge realized that it is impossible for the damages to be $0 while Dietz won – the jury returned an invalid verdict. The judge instructed the clerk of the court to re-empanel the jury. All except for one jurors have been in the hallway; the one juror only went back to a hotel to pick up his hotel receipt; no one discussed the case with any outsider. The judge collectively questioned the jury, was satisfied with the response, and gave out clarifying instructions. The re-empaneled jury returned a verdict in favour of Dietz, with $15,000 in damages. Dietz's counsel objected to re-empanelling and pushed for a new trial. The judge objected, saying that he did not want all the resources that the court spent wasted as a result of a new trial. Dietz appealed to the United States Court of Appeals for the Ninth Circuit arguing that a judge does not have the authority to re-empanel the already-discharged jury. The Ninth Circuit ruled in favour of Bouldin. Since the United States Court of Appeals for the Eighth Circuit reached the contrary conclusion, the Ninth Circuit's ruling created a circuit split. Dietz appealed to the Supreme Court of the United States and the Court granted certiorari in order to resolve the circuit split.

== Opinion of the Court ==
Associate Justice Sonia Sotomayor authored the majority opinion affirming the Ninth Circuit's judgment. The court ruled 6-2 that a judge may recall an already-discharged jury, but has limited authority to do so. They also ruled that this power should be used with caution. The Court noted that since in the era of smartphones and the internet it is not uncommon for people to instinctively check their phones. Thus it is possible for a discharged juror to develop potential prejudice while communicating about the case with someone else via text messages, or quickly Googling about the case to obtain more information about the case. Finally, the Court ruled that in this particular case, the trial judge did not abuse his authority.

== Dissent ==
Justice Clarence Thomas, joined by Justice Anthony Kennedy, dissented. In his dissent, Thomas argued that the common law rule preventing an already-discharged jury to be re-empaneled should control the case. After surveying the history of jury's sequestration, Thomas argued that while the jury is no longer strictly sequestrated, such bright-line rule guarantees that jury will not be biased in any way and ensures that every trial is decided in a fair manner.
