= Montanile v. Board of Trustees of National Elevator Industry Health Benefit Plan =

Montanile v. Board of Trustees of the National Elevator Industry Health Benefit Plan
- Supreme Court of the United States

Argued November 9, 2015 Decided January 20, 2016
- Full case name: Robert Montanile v. Board of Trustees of the National Elevator Industry Health Benefit Plan
- Docket no.: 14-723
- Citations: 577 U.S. ___ (more) 136 S. Ct. 651; 193 L. Ed. 2d 556; 2016 U.S. LEXIS 843

Case history
- Prior: Bd. of Trustees of the Nat'l Elevator Indus. Health Benefit Plan v. Montanile, No. 9:12-cv-80746, 2014 WL 8514011 (S.D. Fla. Mar. 17, 2014); affirmed, 593 F. App'x 903 (11th Cir. 2014); cert. granted, 135 S. Ct. 1700 (2015).

Holding
- ERISA fiduciaries cannot demand payment from a beneficiary's general assets when those assets cannot be traced back to payments from the fiduciary

Court membership
- Chief Justice John Roberts Associate Justices Antonin Scalia · Anthony Kennedy; Clarence Thomas · Ruth Bader Ginsburg; Stephen Breyer · Samuel Alito; Sonia Sotomayor · Elena Kagan

Case opinions
- Majority: Thomas, joined by Roberts, Scalia, Kennedy, Breyer, Sotomayor, Kagan; Alito (except Part III–C)
- Dissent: Ginsburg

Laws applied
- Employee Retirement Income Security Act, 29 U.S.C. § 1001 et seq.

Montanile v. Board of Trustees of the National Elevator Industry Health Benefit Plan, 577 U.S. ___ (2016), was a case in which the Supreme Court of the United States clarified subrogation procedures under the Employee Retirement Income Security Act ("ERISA"). The Court held that healthcare plan fiduciaries cannot demand reimbursement for medical benefits from a plan member's general assets if the beneficiary's general assets cannot be traced back to the original payment from the fiduciary. Although some scholars suggested that the court's ruling would have little impact, others suggested the case places "significant restrictions" on the rights of ERISA benefit plan providers.

== Background ==
The Employee Retirement Income Security Act of 1974 regulates health care benefit plans that are established by employers. Section 502(a)(3) of the Act states that healthcare plan fiduciaries may bring civil lawsuits to enforce the terms of healthcare plans. Robert Montanile participated in an ERISA health plan that was administered by the Board of Trustees of the National Elevator Industry Health Benefit Plan ("the Board"). The terms of his plan stated that he would be required to reimburse the Board when he recovers money from third parties to pay for medical expenses.

=== Initial lawsuit ===
Robert Montanile, a unionized elevator constructor, was severely injured when a drunk driver struck his vehicle In December 2008. Montanile's health plan paid for $121,044.02 of his initial expenses, and he subsequently signed an agreement "reaffirming his obligation to reimburse the plan from any recovery he obtained". After receiving this disbursement, Montanile filed suit against the driver that caused his injuries and ultimately obtained a settlement valued at $500,000. (Note: Justice Thomas' opinion notes that Montanile had to pay $260,000 of this settlement to his attorneys for fees and other advanced funds.) The Board then filed a lawsuit against Montanile under ERISA §502(a)(3) in which they claimed they were entitled to reimbursement for the medical expenses they paid. The United States District Court for the Southern District of Florida ruled in favor of the Board and the United States Court of Appeals for the Eleventh Circuit affirmed the district court's judgment. Montanile appealed to the Supreme Court of the United States, which granted certiorari to resolve a circuit split with respect to whether ERISA fiduciaries may enforce a lien against a beneficiary's separate assets in subrogation proceedings.

== Opinion of the Court ==
In a majority opinion written by Justice Clarence Thomas, the Court held that plan fiduciaries cannot recover medical expenses from a beneficiary's separate assets unless those assets can be traced back to the original ERISA payment. Justice Thomas stated that historically, equitable liens have only been available to plaintiffs when they identify the specific property that was wrongfully withheld by the defendant. If a defendant's general assets cannot be traced to funds that were wrongfully withheld, then equitable liens cannot be used to attach untraceable general assets. Justice Thomas therefore held that the Board could not recover the cost of the initial payment from Montanile's general assets. However, because the lower courts did not determine which of Montanile's assets could be traced back to the medical payment, the Supreme Court remanded the case for further proceedings.

=== Justice Ginsburg's dissenting opinion ===
Justice Ruth Bader Ginsburg filed a short, single-paragraph dissenting opinion in which she argued that Montanile should not be allowed to escape liability by "rapidly" spending his money on non-traceable items. She described the majority's ruling as a "bizarre conclusion" and instead argued that the Court should have affirmed the judgment of the Eleventh Circuit. Justice Ginsburg also urged the Court "to confess its error" and overturn Great-West Life & Annuity Ins. Co. v. Knudson, a case in which the Court held that Congress intended to limit remedies that were available under ERISA section 502(a)(3).

== Commentary and analysis ==
Following the release of the Court's decision, commentators offered a variety predictions about the case's long-term impact. In his review of the Court's decision, Ronald Mann described the case as "a strong candidate for this year’s award for 'case that breaks the least new ground'". John W. Klinker agreed that "[t]he precedent set by this decision may be quite narrow" but also suggested that the case "has the potential to greatly affect the funding of welfare benefits plans". Joshua Bachrach, on the other hand, argued that the Court's decision places "significant restrictions on a plan’s right of recovery when the funds have been spent" and that "benefit plans must consider new ways to preserve their rights".

== See also ==
- List of United States Supreme Court cases
- Lists of United States Supreme Court cases by volume
- List of United States Supreme Court cases by the Roberts Court
