= United States v. Bryant =

- Supreme Court of the United States

Decided June 13, 2016
- Full case name: United States v. Bryant
- Docket no.: 15-420
- Citations: 579 U.S. 140 (more)

Holding
- Tribal-court convictions from proceedings that complied with Indian Civil Rights Act of 1968 may be used as predicate offenses in subsequent prosecution.

Court membership
- Chief Justice John Roberts Associate Justices Anthony Kennedy · Clarence Thomas; Ruth Bader Ginsburg · Stephen Breyer; Samuel Alito · Sonia Sotomayor; Elena Kagan

Case opinion
- Majority: Ginsberg, joined by unanimous

Laws applied
- Indian Civil Rights Act of 1968

United States v. Bryant, 579 U.S. 140 (2016), was a United States Supreme Court case in which the Court held that tribal-court convictions from proceedings that complied with Indian Civil Rights Act of 1968 may be used as predicate offenses in subsequent prosecution.
