= Halo Electronics, Inc. v. Pulse Electronics, Inc. =

- Supreme Court of the United States

Argued February 23, 2016 Decided June 13, 2016
- Full case name: Halo Electronics, Inc., Petitioner v. Pulse Electronics, Inc.
- Docket nos.: 14-1513; 14-1520
- Citations: 579 U.S. 93 (more) 136 S. Ct. 1923; 195 L. Ed. 2d 278; 2016 U.S. LEXIS 3776; 84 U.S.L.W. 4386; 118 U.S.P.Q.2d 1761
- Opinion announcement: Opinion announcement

Case history
- Prior: Affirmed, 769 F.3d 1371 (Fed. Cir. 2014); cert. granted, 136 S.Ct. 356 (2015)

Court membership
- Chief Justice John Roberts Associate Justices Anthony Kennedy · Clarence Thomas; Ruth Bader Ginsburg · Stephen Breyer; Samuel Alito · Sonia Sotomayor; Elena Kagan

Case opinions
- Majority: Roberts, joined by unanimous
- Concurrence: Breyer, joined by Kennedy, Alito

Halo Electronics, Inc. v. Pulse Electronics, Inc., 579 U.S. 93 (2016), was a United States Supreme Court case in which the Court held that the two-part Seagate test, used to determine when a district court may increase damages for patent infringement, is not consistent with Section 284 of the Patent Act.

== Background ==
Halo and Pulse were manufacturers of electronic components that could be mounted on circuit boards used in, among other things, network routers. In 2002, Halo approached Pulse regarding licensing its patents. In response, Pulse's president asked an engineer to review Halo's patents to determine whether Pulse had infringed them. After studying the patents, Pulse's engineer believed that Halo's patents were invalid and thus there was no need to license them. In 2007, Halo filed suit against Pulse in the United States District Court for the District of Nevada for patent infringement. At trial, a jury found that Pulse had infringed Halo's patents, that Pulse's infringement was willful, and that Pulse should pay Halo $1.5 million in reasonable royalty damages. The district court allowed the verdict to stand as to infringement and damages but subsequently overturned the jury's finding of willfulness, believing that it was contrary to the Federal Circuit's Seagate test, which allowed willful infringement only in cases where a defendant had been "objectively reckless" in infringing a plaintiff's patents. Here, the district court concluded that Pulse's belief that the patents were invalid precluded any finding of willful infringement.

Halo appealed the district court's reversal of the willfulness verdict to the Federal Circuit. The Federal Circuit subsequently affirmed the district court's decision to overturn the willfulness verdict, holding that Pulse had presented evidence at trial that its belief in the invalidity of the patents was reasonable and not objectively reckless.

Halo appealed the Federal Circuit's decision to the United States Supreme Court. On October 19, 2015, the Court agreed to hear Halo's appeal. Oral argument took place on February 23, 2016, and the Court issued its opinion on June 13, 2016.

== Opinion of the Court ==
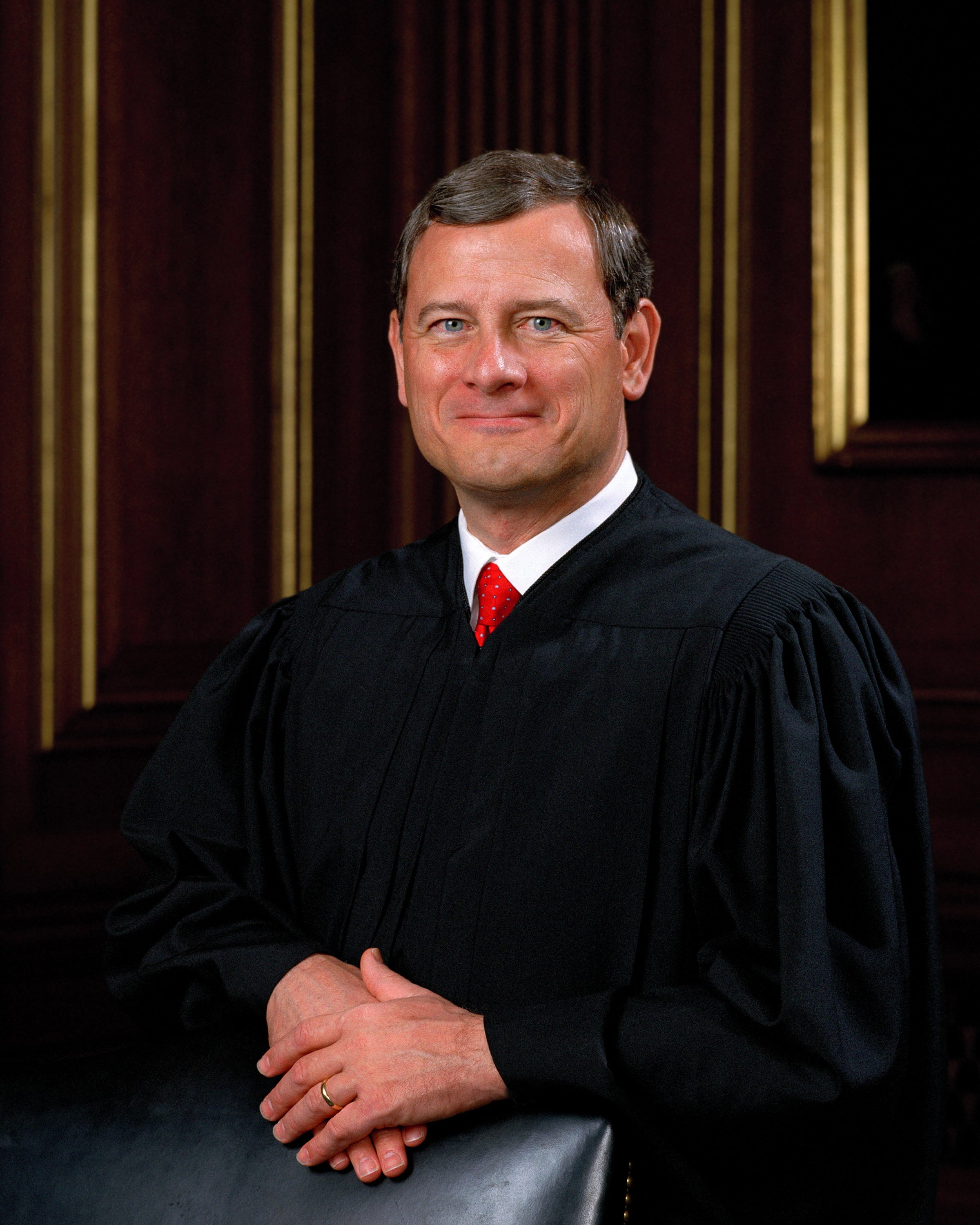
Chief Justice John Roberts issued the opinion for a unanimous court.

Writing for a unanimous court, Chief Justice John Roberts issued an opinion reversing the Federal Circuit and overruling the Seagate test. After surveying the history of the willful infringement statute, Chief Justice Roberts observed that the text of Section 284, which states that, if a defendant is found to infringe, "the court may increase the damages up to three times the amount found or assessed." The Court held that this broad standard was incompatible with the narrow, specific requirement of the Seagate test that the infringer have acted in an "objectively reckless" manner. The Court criticized the Seagate test as incentivizing infringers to concoct defenses with the goal of appearing reasonable, even if those defenses were weak or created solely for the purposes of avoid a willfulness verdict. The Court also criticized the Seagate test as requiring "clear and convincing evidence" of willfulness given that this heightened standard of proof did not appear in the text of Section 284. The Court also directed the Federal Circuit to adopt a more deferential standard of review towards district court findings of willfulness.

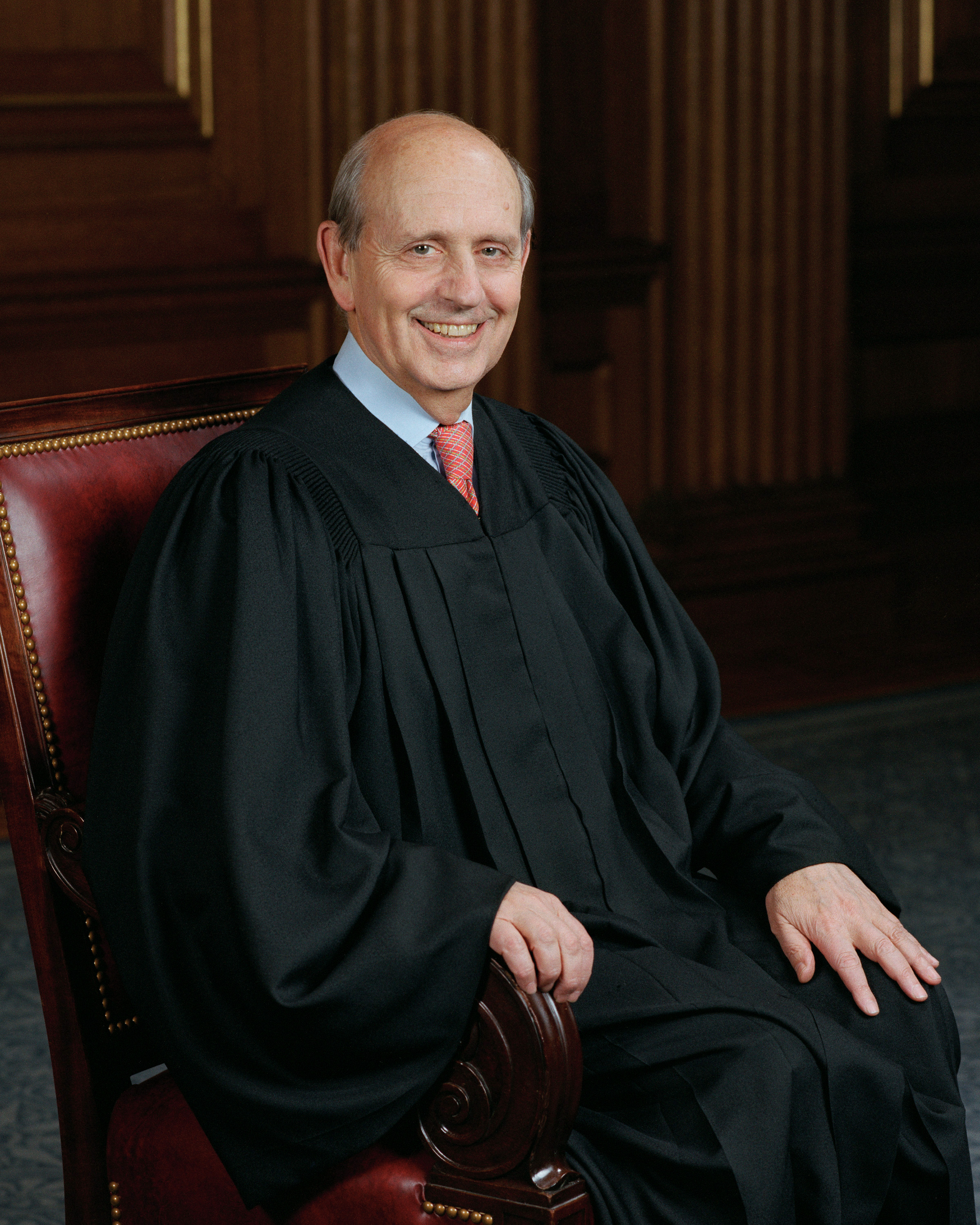
Justice Stephen Breyer issued a concurring opinion.

Justice Stephen Breyer issued a concurring opinion, which was joined by Justices Anthony Kennedy and Samuel Alito. Justice Breyer wrote separately to emphasize three points. First, Justice Breyer observed that evidence showing only knowledge of a patent would likely not meet the standard for willful infringement. Rather, in Justice Breyer's view, willful infringement would require both knowledge of the patent and some additional evidence of egregious conduct by the defendant. Second, Justice Breyer noted that Section 298 of the Patent Act prevents a fact-finder (such as a jury or judge) from considering evidence that a defendant failed to obtain the advice of counsel prior to infringing the patent. Third, Justice Breyer noted that any damages awarded for willful infringement should not be used to compensate a plaintiff for the cost of bringing suit as those costs are already subject to being awarded under Section 285 of the Patent Act. Justice Breyer explained that he was raising these points to emphasize that a finding of willful infringement should only occur in cases of "egregious misconduct" and that courts should be wary of plaintiffs seeking to use the threat of willful infringement to coerce a settlement or otherwise deter lawful conduct by defendants.

== Subsequent proceedings ==
Following the Supreme Court's ruling, the case was remanded to the Federal Circuit for further proceedings. On August 5, 2016, the Federal Circuit subsequently vacated the district court's prior order overturning the willfulness verdict and remanded the case to the district court for reconsideration of that decision. On September 6, 2017, the district court again denied Halo's request for enhanced damages, determining that there was insufficient evidence to prove that Pulse had acted in an egregious manner or like a "pirate."

In the same term, the Supreme Court accepted the case WesternGeco LLC v. ION Geophysical Corp. and sent it back down for reconsideration in light of Halo Electronics.

== Reactions to the Supreme Court's decision ==
Reaction to the Supreme Court's decision was mixed with some commentators praising the Court's decision to eliminate the Federal Circuit's restrictive Seagate test, while others expressed concern at the lack of clarity about when willfulness findings would be warranted going forward. Writing for IPWatchdog on the decision's fifth anniversary, Michael Cicero noted that subsequent decisions applying the Supreme Court's opinion had "lacked consistency" and that the Court's decision had only generated new questions surrounding when willfulness claims were warranted. Finally, at SCOTUSBlog, Ronald Mann interpreted the Court's decision as emblematic of the Supreme Court's repeated frustration with the Federal Circuit and its overeagerness to construct tests that were not reflected in controlling statutory language.
