= 2015 term per curiam opinions of the Supreme Court of the United States =

The Supreme Court of the United States handed down eighteen per curiam opinions during its 2015 term, which began October 5, 2015 and concluded October 2, 2016.

Because per curiam decisions are issued from the Court as an institution, these opinions all lack the attribution of authorship or joining votes to specific justices. All justices on the Court at the time the decision was handed down are assumed to have participated and concurred unless otherwise noted.

== Court membership ==
Chief Justice: John Roberts

Associate Justices: Antonin Scalia (died February 13, 2016), Anthony Kennedy, Clarence Thomas, Ruth Bader Ginsburg, Stephen Breyer, Samuel Alito, Sonia Sotomayor, Elena Kagan

== Maryland v. Kulbicki ==
- Full caption: Maryland v. James Kulbicki
- Citations: 577 U.S. 1
- Prior history: Postconviction petition denied, Kulbicki v. State, No. K-93-530, Md. Cir. Ct, Baltimore Cty., January 2, 2008; aff'd, 53 A.3d 361 (Md. Ct. Spec. App. 2012); cert. granted, 61 A.3d 18 (Md. 2013); rev'd and remanded, 99 A. 3d 730 (Md. 2014)
- Laws applied: U.S. const. amend. VI
- Full text of the opinion: official slip opinion · Jusstia

577 U.S. 1
Decided October 5, 2015.
Court of Appeals of Maryland reversed.

The lower court misapplied the Strickland v. Washington test to determine if a criminal defendant's Sixth Amendment right to counsel is violated by that counsel's inadequate performance. James Kulbicki was arrested for murdering his 22-year old mistress. At the time of his initial trial, a comparative bullet-lead analysis (CBLA), a technique that was generally accepted at the time, was used as evidence against him. By the time the Maryland Court of Appeals heard his case, CBLA had been discredited and abandoned. The Court ruled that it found no support for the lower court's conclusion that Kulbicki's defense attorneys were constitutionally required to predict the demise of CBLA: "Counsel did not perform deficiently by dedicating their time and focus to elements of the defense that did not involve poking methodological holes in a then-uncontroversial mode of ballistics analysis."

== Mullenix v. Luna ==
- Full caption: Chadrin Lee Mullenix v. Beatrice Luna, individually and as representative of the Estate of Israel Leija, Jr., et al.
- Citations: 577 U.S. 7
- Prior history: Summary judgment denied, 2013 WL 4017124 (N.D. Tex., Aug. 7, 2013); aff'd, 773 F. 3d 712 (5th Cir. 2014); opinion withdrawn, substituted opinion at 777 F. 3d 221 (5th Cir. 2014); rehearing en banc denied, 77 F. 3d 221 (2014)
- Laws applied: U.S. Const. amend. IV
- Full text of the opinion: official slip opinion · FindLaw

577 U.S. 7
Decided November 9, 2015.
Fifth Circuit reversed.

The Court granted qualified immunity to Texas Department of Public Safety trooper Chadrin Mullenix, who killed suspect Israel Leija, Jr. as he was fleeing officers during a high-speed chase. During the pursuit which reached up to 110 miles per hour, Leija twice called police stating that he had a gun and threatened to shoot anyone who tried to stop him. As several officers set up spike strips along the route, Mullenix decided to shoot at Leija's car as an alternative attempt to disable it. He radioed his superior officer as to his plans, but took his shooting position before receiving a response. His superior told Mullenix to "stand by" and wait to see if the spike strips work, but he claimed that he did not hear this order. Mullenix ended up killing Leija instead, and it was later found that the suspect was actually unarmed. Beatrice Luna, representing Leija's family and estate, then sued Mullenix on grounds that he violated Leija's Fourth Amendment right by using excessive force. The Court however ruled that Mullenix is entitled to qualified immunity, stating that the Court has "never found the use of deadly force in connection with a dangerous car chase to violate the Fourth Amendment, let alone to be a basis for denying qualified immunity." Furthermore, it was not clearly established the Mullenix "[selected] one dangerous alternative over another."

Scalia filed a concurrence, arguing that any use of force that eventually kills a suspect should not automatically be classified as "deadly force". He stated that in this case, "though it was force sufficient to kill, it was not applied with the object of harming the body of the felon."

Sotomayor filed a dissent, citing the fact that Mullenix was not properly trained to use a rifle in this type of situation, he fired less than a second before the car hit the spike strip, and did not follow the order to "stand by." She wrote, "by sanctioning a 'shoot first, think later' approach to policing, the Court renders the protections of the Fourth Amendment hollow."

== White v. Wheeler ==
- Full caption: Randy White, Warden v. Roger L. Wheeler
- Citations: 577 U.S. 73
- Prior history: Petition denied, sub nom. Wheeler v. Simpson, No. 3:09-cv-00336, W.D. Ky.; rev'd, 779 F. 3d 366 (6th Cir. 2015)
- Laws applied: U.S. Const. amend. VI, Antiterrorism and Effective Death Penalty Act of 1996
- Full text of the opinion: official slip opinion · Justia

577 U.S. 73
Decided December 14, 2015.
Sixth Circuit reversed and remanded.

The Sixth Circuit overturned a death sentence in Kentucky, ruling that excusing "Juror 638" during jury selection violated the Sixth Amendment. The juror in question was excused on the basis that he could not provide sufficient answers as to whether he could be neutral or impartial in considering the death penalty in the case. The Supreme Court ruled that the Sixth Circuit unreasonably applied Witherspoon v. Illinois and Wainwright v. Witt, and should have instead applied the Court's interpretations of the Antiterrorism and Effective Death Penalty Act of 1996.

== James v. Boise ==
- Full caption: Melene James v. City of Boise, Idaho
- Citations: 577 U.S. 306
- Prior history: Summary judgment granted to defendants, Idaho Dist. Ct.; aff'd, 351 P. 3d 1171 (Idaho 2015)
- Laws applied: 42 U.S.C. § 1988
- Full text of the opinion: official slip opinion · FindLaw

577 U.S. 306
Decided January 25, 2016.
Supreme Court of Idaho reversed and remanded.

It, like any other state or federal court, is bound by the Supreme Court's interpretation of federal law. In this case, the Idaho Supreme Court concluded that it was not bound by the Supreme Court's interpretation in Hughes v. Rowe, regarding awarding attorney's fees to a prevailing defendant.

== Amgen Inc. v. Harris ==
- Full caption: Amgen Inc., et al. v. Steve Harris, et al.
- Citations: 577 U.S. 308
- Prior history: Dismissed, No. 07-05442, C.D. Cal.; rev'd, 738 F. 3d 1026 (9th Cir. 2013); vacated, 576 U.S. ___ (2014); rev'd, rehearing en banc denied, 788 F. 3d 916 (9th Cir. 2014)
- Laws applied: 29 U.S.C. § 1104 (Employee Retirement Income Security Act)
- Full text of the opinion: official slip opinion · Justia

577 U.S. 308
Decided January 25, 2016.
Ninth Circuit reversed and remanded.

The Ninth Circuit did not properly apply the standard established in Fifth Third v. Dudenhoeffer regarding provisions of the Employee Retirement Income Security Act.

== Wearry v. Cain ==
- Full caption: Michael Wearry v. Burl Cain, Warden
- Citations: 577 U.S. 385
- Prior history: Petition denied, sub nom. State v. Wearry, No. 01–FELN–015992 (La. Dist. Ct., Livingston Parish August 14, 2013); review denied, No. 13-KP-2422 (La. February 27, 2015)
- Laws applied: U.S. Const. amend. XIV
- Full text of the opinion: official slip opinion · Justia

577 U.S. 385
Decided March 7, 2016.
District Court of Louisiana, Livingston Parish, reversed and remanded.

Louisiana prosecutors violated Michael Wearry's due process rights when they failed to disclose evidence supporting his innocence in a murder case.

Alito filed a dissent, joined by Thomas, arguing that the majority should not have made the unusual step of deciding this case without hearing oral arguments or even allowing the parties to file briefs. Alito wrote "that the prosecution should have disclosed this information, but whether the information was sufficient to warrant reversing petitioner's conviction is another matter."

== V.L. v. E.L. ==
- Full caption: V. L. v. E. L., et al.
- Citations: 577 U.S. 404
- Prior history: Judgment for petitioner, No. CS-13-719 (April 15, 2014 Ala. Dist. Ct., Jefferson Cty.); rev'd, No. 2130683 (Ala. Ct. Civ. App. Oct. 24, 2014); on rehearing, aff'd in part, sub nom. Ex parte E.L., No. 2130683, 2015 WL 836916 (Ala. Ct. Civ. App. Feb. 27, 2015); rev., No. 1140595, 2015 WL 5511249 (Ala. September 18, 2015)
- Laws applied: U.S. Const., Art. IV, §1; Ga. Code Ann. §19–8–5(a)
- Full text of the opinion: official slip opinion · Justia

577 U.S. 404
Decided March 7, 2016.
Supreme Court of Alabama reversed and remanded.

Under the Full Faith and Credit Clause, the State of Alabama must recognize the adoption decree granted by a Georgia state court in 2007, regardless of how that court came to its conclusion granting the decree.

== Caetano v. Massachusetts ==
- Full caption: Jaime Caetano v. Massachusetts
- Citations: 577 U.S. 411
- Prior history: Motion to dismiss denied, sub nom. Commonwealth v. Caetano, No. 1149-CR-2522 (Mass. Dist. Ct. April 29, 2013); defendant convicted, No. 1149-CR-2522, Mass. Dist. Ct.; aff'd, 26 N. E. 3d 688 (Mass. 2015)
- Laws applied: U.S. Const. amend. II; Mass. Gen. Laws, ch. 140, §131J (2014)
- Full text of the opinion: official slip opinion · Justia

577 U.S. 411
Decided March 21, 2016.
Supreme Judicial Court of Massachusetts vacated and remanded.

The Massachusetts court erred in upholding a law that prohibited the possession of stun guns.

Alito filed an opinion concurring in the judgment, joined by Thomas.

== Woods v. Etherton ==
- Full caption: Jeffrey Woods, Warden v. Timothy Etherton
- Citations: 578 U.S. 113
- Prior history: Petition denied, No. 11-11958, E.D. Mich. Feb. 26, 2014); rev'd, sub nom. Etherton v. Rivard, 800 F. 3d 737 (6th Cir. 2015)
- Laws applied: U.S. Const. amend. VI; 28 U.S.C. § 2254(d)(1) (Antiterrorism and Effective Death Penalty Act of 1996)
- Full text of the opinion: official slip opinion · Justia

578 U.S. 113
Decided April 4, 2016.
It is not a violation of the Confrontation Clause or the hearsay rules of evidence for the prosecution in a criminal trial to introduce information provided by an anonymous informant if the information is not admitted as evidence to prove the truth of the matter asserted and the judge provides a limiting instruction informing the jury of this. A defense attorney's failure to challenge such statements on hearsay grounds is not ineffective assistance of counsel.

Sixth Circuit reversed.

The Sixth Circuit did not properly apply the standard of review under the Antiterrorism and Effective Death Penalty Act of 1996.

== Zubik v. Burwell ==
- Full caption: David A. Zubik, et al. v. Sylvia Burwell, Secretary of Health and Human Services, et al.
- Citations: 578 U.S. 403
- Prior history: Judgment for plaintiffs, 983 F. Supp. 2d 576 (W.D. Penn. 2013); rev'd, 778 F. 3d 422 (3d Cir. 2015); rehearing en banc denied, No. 14-1377, 3d Cir. April 6, 2015; certiorari granted, 577 U.S. ___ (2015)
- Laws applied: 42 U.S.C. § 2000bb (Religious Freedom Restoration Act)
- Full text of the opinion: official slip opinion · Justia

578 U.S. 403
Decided May 16, 2016.
Third, Fifth, Tenth, and District of Columbia Circuits vacated and remanded for reconsideration, in light of the "positions asserted by the parties in their supplemental briefs," on whether religious institutions other than churches should be exempt from the contraceptive mandate of the Affordable Care Act.

Sotomayor filed a concurrence, joined by Ginsburg, cautioning lower courts not to read any signals in the Supreme Court's actions in this case.

== Kernan v. Hinojosa ==
- Full caption: Scott Kernan, Secretary, California Department of Corrections and Rehabilitation v. Antonio A. Hinojosa
- Citations: 578 U.S. 412
- Prior history: Petition denied, No. 12-965, C.D. Cal.; rev'd, sub nom. Hinojosa v. Davey, 803 F. 3d 412 (9th Cir. 2015)
- Laws applied: 28 U.S.C. § 2254(b)(1)(A) (Antiterrorism and Effective Death Penalty Act of 1996)
- Full text of the opinion: official slip opinion · Justia

578 U.S. 412
Decided May 16, 2016.
Ninth Circuit reversed.

The lower court misapplied the test in Ylst v. Nunnemaker that states that if a state court order denies a habeas petition without explanation, it is presumed that the order agrees with the "last reasoned state court opinion" in the case unless there is "strong evidence" to the contrary.

Sotomayor filed a dissent, joined by Ginsburg, arguing that applying the Ylst test should have affirmed the Ninth Circuit ruling.

== Johnson v. Lee ==
- Full caption: Deborah K. Johnson, Warden v. Donna Kay Lee
- Citations: 578 U.S. 605
- Prior history: Petition denied, sub nom. Lee v. Jacquez, No. 01-10751, C.D. Cal.; aff'd in part, rev'd, 406 Fed. Appx. 148 (9th Cir. 2010); on remand, petition denied, No. 01-10751, C.D. Cal.; rev'd, 788 F.3d 1124 (9th Cir. 2015)
- Full text of the opinion: official slip opinion · Justia

578 U.S. 605
Decided May 31, 2016.
Ninth Circuit reversed and remanded.

The Ninth Circuit previously held that California's "Dixon Bar" (which states that a defendant procedurally defaults a claim raised for the first time on state collateral review if he could have raised it earlier on direct appeal) is inadequate to bar federal habeas review. The Court reversed the Ninth Circuit on grounds that this procedural bar "is longstanding, oft-cited, and shared by habeas courts across the nation".

== Lynch v. Arizona ==
- Full caption: Shawn Patrick Lynch v. Arizona
- Citations: 578 U.S. 613
- Prior history: Defendant convicted and sentenced, No. 2001-092032, Ariz. Sup. Ct., Maricopa Cty.; rev'd, 234 P. 3d 595 (Ariz 2010); defendant resentenced, No. 2001-092032, Ariz. Sup. Ct., Maricopa Cty.; aff'd, 357 P. 3d 119 (Ariz. 2015)
- Laws applied: U.S. Const. amend. XIV
- Full text of the opinion: official slip opinion · Justia

578 U.S. 613
Decided May 31, 2016.
Supreme Court of Arizona reversed and remanded.

The Arizona court misapplied the test in Simmons v. South Carolina (1994), which states "where a capital defendant's future dangerousness is at issue, and the only sentencing alternative to death available to the jury is life imprisonment without possibility of parole," the Due Process Clause entitles the defendant 'to inform the jury of [his] parole ineligibility, either by a jury instruction or in arguments by counsel.'"

Thomas filed a dissent, joined by Alito. Thomas repeated what he wrote in his dissent in Simmons, and then stated that "today’s decision imposes a magic-words requirement" and "is a remarkably aggressive use of our power to review the States' highest courts".

== See also ==
- List of United States Supreme Court cases, volume 577
- List of United States Supreme Court cases, volume 578
