= Hughes v. Talen Energy Marketing, LLC =

- Supreme Court of the United States

Decided April 19, 2016
- Full case name: Hughes v. Talen Energy Marketing, LLC
- Citations: 578 U.S. 150 (more)

Holding
- State regulation of the energy market is preempted if it conflicts with requirements set by the Federal Energy Regulatory Commission, including rates.

Court membership
- Chief Justice John Roberts Associate Justices Anthony Kennedy · Clarence Thomas; Ruth Bader Ginsburg · Stephen Breyer; Samuel Alito · Sonia Sotomayor; Elena Kagan

Case opinions
- Majority: Ginsburg
- Concurrence: Sotomayor
- Concurrence: Thomas (in part)

Laws applied
- Supremacy Clause

Hughes v. Talen Energy Marketing, LLC, 578 U.S. 150 (2016), was a United States Supreme Court case in which the court held that state regulation of the energy market is preempted if it conflicts with requirements set by the Federal Energy Regulatory Commission, including rates.

== Background ==
The Federal Power Act (FPA) vests in the Federal Energy Regulatory Commission (FERC) exclusive jurisdiction over wholesale sales of electricity in the interstate market, but leaves to the states alone the regulation of retail electricity sales. In Maryland and other states that have deregulated their energy markets, "load serving entities" (LSEs) purchase electricity at wholesale from independent power generators for delivery to retail consumers. Interstate wholesale transactions in deregulated markets typically occur through (1) bilateral contracting, where LSEs agree to purchase a certain amount of electricity from generators at a certain rate over a certain period of time; and (2) competitive wholesale auctions administered by Regional Transmission Organizations (RTOs) and Independent System Operators (ISOs), nonprofit entities that manage certain segments of the electricity grid.

PJM Interconnection (PJM), an RTO overseeing a multistate grid, operates a capacity auction. The capacity auction is designed to identify need for new generation and to accommodate long-term bilateral contracts for capacity. PJM predicts demand three years into the future and assigns a share of that demand to each participating LSE. Owners of capacity to produce electricity in three years' time then bid that capacity into the auction for sale to PJM at rates the sellers set in their bids. PJM accepts bids until it has purchased enough capacity to satisfy anticipated demand. All accepted capacity sellers receive the highest accepted rate, called the "clearing price." LSEs then must purchase, from PJM, enough electricity to satisfy their assigned share of overall projected demand. FERC extensively regulates the structure of the capacity auction to ensure that it efficiently balances supply and demand, producing a clearing price considered just and reasonable.

Concerned that the PJM capacity auction was failing to encourage development of sufficient new in-state generation, Maryland enacted its own regulatory program. Maryland selected, through a proposal process, petitioner CPV Maryland, LLC (CPV), to construct a new power plant and required LSEs to enter into a 20-year pricing contract (called a contract for differences) with CPV at a rate CPV specified in its proposal. Under the terms of the contract, CPV sells its capacity to PJM through the auction, but—through mandated payments from or to LSEs—receives the contract price rather than the clearing price for these sales to PJM. In a suit filed by incumbent generators, including Talen Energy Marketing, against members of the Maryland Public Service Commission—CPV intervened as a defendant—the federal district court issued a declaratory judgment holding that Maryland's program improperly sets the rate CPV receives for interstate wholesale capacity sales to PJM. The Fourth Circuit Court of Appeals affirmed.

== Opinion of the court ==
The court issued an opinion on April 19, 2016.
