= Tyson Foods, Inc. v. Bouaphakeo =

- Supreme Court of the United States

Argued November 10, 2015 Decided March 22, 2016
- Full case name: Tyson Foods, Inc., Petitioner v. Peg Bouaphakeo, et al., Individually and on Behalf of All Others Similarly Situated
- Docket no.: 14-1146
- Citations: 577 U.S. 442 (more) 136 S. Ct. 1036; 194 L. Ed. 2d 124; 2016 U.S. LEXIS 2134
- Argument: Oral argument

Case history
- Prior: Bouaphakeo v. Tyson Foods, Inc., 765 F.3d 791 (8th Cir. 2014); cert. granted, 135 S. Ct. 2806 (2015).

Holding
- The district court did not err in certifying and maintaining a class of employees who allege that the employer’s failure to pay them for donning and doffing protective gear violate the Fair Labor Standards Act, notwithstanding the employees’ reliance on “representative evidence” to determine the number of additional hours that each employee worked, when the employer had failed to keep adequate records.

Court membership
- Chief Justice John Roberts Associate Justices Anthony Kennedy · Clarence Thomas; Ruth Bader Ginsburg · Stephen Breyer; Samuel Alito · Sonia Sotomayor; Elena Kagan

Case opinions
- Majority: Kennedy, joined by Roberts, Ginsburg, Breyer, Sotomayor, Kagan
- Concurrence: Roberts, joined by Alito (Part II)
- Dissent: Thomas, joined by Alito

Tyson Foods, Inc. v. Bouaphakeo, 577 U.S. 442 (2016), was a United States Supreme Court case in which the Court affirmed the decision of the United States Court of Appeals for the Eighth Circuit, which held that representative evidence could be used to support the claims of the class. The case arose as a class action lawsuit against Tyson Foods. The Supreme Court affirmed the Eighth Circuit's judgment that the class satisfied the predominance requirement of the Federal Rules of Civil Procedure's Rule 23 and that the use of representative evidence was allowable in this case. It has been cited by lower courts and has spawned significant academic discussion.

== Background ==
Employees brought suit in federal district court against Tyson Foods for violations of the Fair Labor Standards Act (FLSA) and the Iowa Wage Payment Collection Law. The employees worked in an Iowa pork processing plant in the cut and retrim and kill departments. As part of their work, the employees needed to wear protective gear, and the FLSA required for them to be compensated for time spent doing things "integral and indispensable" to their work. The employees claimed that the time spent putting on and taking off their protective gear, "donning and doffing," met the standard and that Tyson Foods should have been paying them for the time that they did so. Instead, Tyson Foods compensated some employees for four to eight minutes of that activity and others for none at all.

The employees sought to certify their class under Rule 23 of the Federal Rules of Civil Procedure. Tyson Foods argued that the class should not be certified because of the individual variance in the employees' protective gear.

The district court held that there were sufficiently-common questions to certify the class, such as whether the donning and doffing qualified as work under the FLSA. The case was tried and went to a jury, which had to decide whether the donning and doffing qualified as work and how much time that took but was not paid for by Tyson Foods. The claims were based on overtime work and so only employees who, after including donning and doffing time, worked more than forty hours per week would be able to recover.

However, Tyson Foods did not keep records of the time that employees spent to put on and take off their protective gear. The employees, therefore, relied on their statements, videos of people putting on and taking off protective gear, and a research study. The study had people put on and take off gear and averaged how long it took, which was considered "representative evidence."

Tyson Foods asked the judge to bifurcate proceedings so that the jury would first answer whether the FLSA covered time taken to put on and take off protective gear and how long the donning and doffing took, and the jury would then determine which employees would be eligible to recover.

However, Tyson Foods did not question the representative evidence used, such as by moving for a Daubert hearing, and instead emphasized that there was too much individual variance for the issues to be resolved in a class.

The representative evidence presented would have supported an award of $6.7 million. The jury found that donning and doffing was compensable under the FLSA but awarded only $2.9 million to the class.

Tyson moved to set aside the jury verdict by alleging improper class certification. The Court of Appeals for the Eighth Circuit disagreed, affirmed the judgment, and held that the use of representative evidence was appropriate in this case.

== Decision ==
The Supreme Court affirmed the decision of the Eighth Circuit. The parties were in dispute over whether the class met the predominance inquiry required by Federal Rule of Civil Procedure 23(b)(3), which requires the district court to ask whether common questions predominate over individual ones. That examination is meant to ensure that it makes sense to adjudicate the claims as a class. The predominance inquiry is different from the commonality inquiry in class actions since it asks not only whether there are common questions but also whether the common, class-wide issues are more important or arise more frequently than the individual ones.

Tyson Foods maintained that the common questions did not predominate because it was the questions of each individual's work time that predominated. The employees, by contrast, argued that the representative evidence could replace individual inquiries. The permissibility of the representative evidence, therefore, was central to the case.

The Supreme Court looked to the practical need for representative evidence and recognized that in some cases, it is the only evidence available. Since Tyson Foods had failed to keep records on employee time, representative evidence was necessary. The key inquiry, according to the Supreme Court, was whether the employees would have similarly used the representative evidence in individual lawsuits if they had brought individual suits instead of a class action.

It was on that point that the Court distinguished Wal-Mart Stores, Inc. v. Dukes, 564 U.S. 338 (2011). In Wal-Mart, the class had failed to meet the more basic commonality requirement of class actions. The plaintiffs wanted to use representative evidence to show that there was a common policy of discretion in employment. However, in that case, since the employees were not similarly situated, they would not have been able to use the representative evidence even if they had brought individual lawsuits.

In Tyson Foods, however, the representative evidence could be used to support a finding for individual plaintiffs. The Court noted that Tyson Foods did not challenge the expert testimony or the study on which the plaintiffs relied. Also, Tyson Foods argued that because not all class members would be found to be injured and receive compensation, the employees had to show a clear mechanism by which the district court could identify the class members who were not injured and so should not recover. That question was not presented in the lower courts, and the record was not developed on that point, however, so the Supreme Court remanded for further proceedings on that matter.

=== Concurrence ===
Chief Justice Roberts concurred, joined by Justice Alito in Part II. Part I suggested that the Court was not relaxing rules for representative evidence in this case but had found that the study met the required standard of proof. Part II expressed concern that there is no clear way to determine how much time the jury thought should be compensated for donning and doffing since it awarded a sum lower than the study suggested to be appropriate. To be compensated, each employee must have gone uncompensated for some of the donning and doffing time and must have worked overtime once that time was factored in. However, since the jury did not report how much time they found should be compensated for the different departments, it is unclear how the district court would be able to award damages only to employees who were found by the jury found to be injured.

=== Dissent ===
Justice Thomas dissented, joined by Justice Alito. The dissent believed the district court was wrong in finding that the class satisfied Rule 23's predominance requirement because it did not recognize that whether each employee worked overtime was a critical individual issue. Because the district court did not appropriately analyze the class certification requirements, according to the dissent, Tyson Foods could be held liable to a large group without proof that each individual within the class was injured. The dissent also suggested that the majority opinion improperly construed the predominance inquiry, relaxed the rule for representative evidence, and failed to adhere to prior precedent.

== Implications ==
Tyson Foods made headlines when it reached the Supreme Court. Legal commentators also blogged about the case.

Though relatively recent, it has already been cited in other cases and been a popular topic of legal scholarship. Experts continue to discuss Tyson’s legacy, particular how the case will impact the predominance inquiry and whether the use of representative evidence will expand.

=== Selected Supreme Court and Federal Courts of Appeals Cases ===
- FTS USA LLC v. Monroe, 137 S. Ct. 590, 590 (2016) (Supreme Court granted, vacated, and remanded in light of Tyson Foods).
- Fisher v. Univ. of Tex. at Austin, 136 S. Ct. 2198, 2241 n.19 (2016) (citing Tyson Foods for the proposition that you could use representative samples when needed because employers did not keep sufficient records).
- Vaquero v. Ashley Furniture Indus., Inc., 824 F.3d 1150, 1155 (9th Cir. 2016) (citing Tyson Foods for the proposition that needing to calculate individual damages does not per se defeat the predominance inquiry for class certifications).
- Day v. Celadon Trucking Servs., Inc., 827 F.3d 817, 833 (8th Cir. 2016) (similar).
- In re Petrobras Sec., 862 F.3d 250, 270-71 (2d Cir. 2017) (describing the predominance inquiry laid down in Tyson Foods).
- Taha v. County of Bucks, 862 F.3d 292, 308 (3d Cir. 2017) (similar).

=== Selected Scholarship ===
- Michael G. McLellan, Statistical Evidence, Antitrust Impact, and Class Certification: Tyson Foods and Antitrust Class Actions, ANTITRUST, Fall 2017, at 51 (discussing the issues present in Tyson in the antitrust context and how Tyson’s holding might influence antitrust litigation).
- Daniel Yablon, Note, Tyson Foods, Inc. v. Bouaphakeo: A Murky Future for Representative Evidence in Rule 23(b)(3) Class Actions and FLSA Collective Actions, 38 BERKELEY J. EMP. & LAB. L. 327 (2017) (describing Tyson Foods and speculating on the difficulties lower courts may have in determining when and how to use representative evidence).
- Hillel J. Bavli & John Kenneth Felter, The Admissibility of Sampling Evidence to Prove Individual Damages in Class Actions, 59 B.C. L. REV. 655 (2018) (proposing a method to determine when to use sampling evidence in class actions to prove individual damages).
- Hillel J. Bavli, Sampling and Reliability in Class Action Litigation, 2016 CARDOZO L. REV. DE NOVO 207 (2016) (discussing the benefits of sampling and its application in class action litigation in light of Tyson Foods).
- Andrew J. Trask, Litigation Matters: The Curious Case of Tyson Foods v. Bouaphakeo, 2016 CATO SUP. CT. REV. 278 (2016) (analyzing Tyson Foods and suggesting how the case might influence class actions).
- Civil Procedure—Representative Evidence—Tyson Foods, Inc. v. Bouaphakeo, 130 HARV. L. REV. 407 (2016) (discussing Tyson Foods and how trial courts address wage-and-hour disputes).
- Robert H. Klonoff, Class Actions Part II: A Respite from the Decline, 92 N.Y.U. L. REV. 971 (2017) (describing trends in class actions, including the holding and potential consequences in circuit courts of Tyson Foods).
- Robert G. Bone, Tyson Foods and the Future of Statistical Adjudication, 95 N.C. L. REV. 607 (2017) (discussing the consequences of Tyson Foods on using statistics and sampling for liability).

=== Selected Treatises and Manuals ===
- ANNOTATED MANUAL FOR COMPLEX LITIGATION § 21.28 (4th ed., May 2018) (noting that in Tyson Foods, the Court held that representative evidence could be used to satisfy the class certification predominance inquiry).
- NEWBERG ON CLASS ACTIONS § 4:50 (5th ed., Dec. 2017) (citing Tyson Foods for the definition of an individual question).
- 5 FED. PROC. FORMS § 11:32 (citing Tyson Foods for a description of the predominance inquiry).

== See also ==
- Fair Labor Standards Act of 1938 (FLSA)
- Class action
- List of United States Supreme Court cases
- List of United States Supreme Court cases, volume 577
