= Cuozzo Speed Technologies, LLC v. Lee =

- Supreme Court of the United States

Decided June 20, 2016
- Full case name: Cuozzo Speed Technologies, LLC v. Lee
- Docket no.: 15-446
- Citations: 579 U.S. 261 (more)

Holding
- The Patent Office's inter partes review process is constitutional.

Court membership
- Chief Justice John Roberts Associate Justices Anthony Kennedy · Clarence Thomas; Ruth Bader Ginsburg · Stephen Breyer; Samuel Alito · Sonia Sotomayor; Elena Kagan

Case opinions
- Majority: Breyer, joined by unanimous (Parts I and III); Roberts, Kennedy, Thomas, Ginsburg, Kagan (Part II)
- Concurrence: Thomas
- Concur/dissent: Alito, joined by Sotomayor

Laws applied
- Leahy–Smith America Invents Act

Cuozzo Speed Technologies, LLC v. Lee, 579 U.S. 261 (2016), was a United States Supreme Court case in which the Court held that the Patent Office's inter partes review process is constitutional. Under the Leahy–Smith America Invents Act, the review process is unreviewable by courts. In upholding that, the Supreme Court did not decide whether issues with constitutional dimensions could be made unreviewable.
