= Utah v. Strieff =

- Supreme Court of the United States

Argued February 22, 2016 Decided June 20, 2016
- Full case name: Utah, Petitioner v. Edward Joseph Strieff, Jr.
- Docket no.: 14-1373
- Citations: 579 U.S. 232 (more) 136 S. Ct. 2056; 195 L. Ed. 2d 400
- Argument: Oral argument
- Opinion announcement: Opinion announcement

Case history
- Prior: On writ of certiorari to the Utah Supreme Court
- Procedural: affirming evidence admission, 286 P.3d 317 (Utah Ct. App. 2012), reversing, 357 P.3d 532 (Utah 2015)

Holding
- The evidence seized incident to arrest is admissible. The officer's discovery of a valid, pre-existing, and untainted arrest warrant attenuated the connection between the unconstitutional investigatory stop and the evidence seized incident to a lawful arrest.

Court membership
- Chief Justice John Roberts Associate Justices Anthony Kennedy · Clarence Thomas; Ruth Bader Ginsburg · Stephen Breyer; Samuel Alito · Sonia Sotomayor; Elena Kagan

Case opinions
- Majority: Thomas, joined by Roberts, Kennedy, Breyer, Alito
- Dissent: Sotomayor, joined by Ginsburg (Parts I, II, and III)
- Dissent: Kagan, joined by Ginsburg

Laws applied
- U.S. Const. amend. IV

Utah v. Strieff, 579 U.S. 232, 136 S. Ct. 2056 (2016), was a case in which the Supreme Court of the United States limited the scope of the Fourth Amendment's exclusionary rule.

== Background ==
In December 2006, South Salt Lake, Utah police began surveilling a suspected drug house. Police observed Edward Strieff leaving the house although they had not observed him entering it. An officer stopped Strieff on the street and conducted an investigatory detention; after asking Strieff for identification, officers discovered that Strieff had an outstanding warrant for a traffic violation. Officers conducted a search incident to his arrest, and discovered that Strieff was in possession of drug paraphernalia and methamphetamine. At a suppression hearing, prosecutors conceded that officers lacked reasonable suspicion to conduct the investigatory detention, but argued that the evidence seized during the detention should not be excluded because "the existence of a valid arrest warrant attenuated the connection between the unlawful stop and the discovery of the contraband." The trial court admitted the evidence and Strieff then pleaded guilty, but reserved his right to appeal the suppression motion.

In August 2012, the divided Utah Court of Appeals affirmed the trial court, but in January 2015 the unanimous Utah Supreme Court reversed in an opinion by Justice Thomas Rex Lee.

== Opinion of the Court ==
=== Majority opinion ===
On June 20, 2016, the U.S. Supreme Court reversed, by a vote of 5–3. Writing for the Court, Justice Clarence Thomas, joined by Chief Justice John Roberts and Justices Anthony Kennedy, Stephen Breyer, and Samuel Alito, held that the evidence was admissible because "the discovery of a valid arrest warrant was a sufficient intervening event to break the causal chain between the unlawful stop and the discovery of drug-related evidence on Strieff's person." Thomas further wrote: "Although the illegal stop was close in time to Strieff's arrest, that consideration is outweighed by two factors supporting the State. The outstanding arrest warrant for Strieff's arrest is a critical intervening circumstance that is wholly independent of the illegal stop. The discovery of that warrant broke the causal chain between the unconstitutional stop and the discovery of evidence by compelling Officer Fackrell to arrest Strieff. And, it is especially significant that there is no evidence that Officer Fackrell's illegal stop reflected flagrantly unlawful police misconduct."

=== Dissents ===
Justices Sonia Sotomayor and Elena Kagan wrote dissents. Sotomayor wrote that the evidence should be inadmissible. Justice Ruth Bader Ginsburg joined all but part IV of Justice Sotomayor's opinion.

In part IV of Sotomayor's dissent, "writing only for [herself]", she wrote that "it is no secret that people of color are disproportionate victims of this type of scrutiny ... For generations, black and brown parents have given their children 'the talk'—instructing them never to run down the street; always keep your hands where they can be seen; do not even think of talking back to a stranger—all out of fear of how an officer with a gun will react to them." She cited Michelle Alexander's The New Jim Crow and Ta-Nehisi Coates's Between the World and Me. Sotomayor wrote that the case "implies that you are not a citizen of a democracy but the subject of a carceral state, just waiting to be cataloged" and that unlawful stops "corrode all our civil liberties". Her dissent was called "ringing", citing "a canon for modern critiques of mass incarceration". Another writer characterized the dissent as "gripping".

Justice Elena Kagan also wrote a dissenting opinion, in which Justice Ginsburg joined in full. Kagan argued that the majority's ruling "creates unfortunate incentives for the police". She explained: "So long as the target is one of the many millions of people in this country with an outstanding arrest warrant, anything the officer finds in a search is fair game for use in a criminal prosecution. The officer's incentive to violate the Constitution thus increases: From here on, he sees potential advantage in stopping individuals without reasonable suspicion—exactly the temptation the exclusionary rule is supposed to remove. Because the majority thus places Fourth Amendment protections at risk, I respectfully dissent."

== See also ==
- List of United States Supreme Court cases
- Lists of United States Supreme Court cases by volume
- List of United States Supreme Court cases by the Roberts Court
