= Green v. Brennan =

- Supreme Court of the United States

Argued November 30, 2015 Decided May 23, 2016
- Full case name: Marvin Green, Petitioner v. Megan J. Brennan, Postmaster General
- Docket no.: 14-613
- Citations: 578 U.S. 547 (more) 136 S. Ct. 1769; 195 L. Ed. 2d 44
- Opinion announcement: Opinion announcement

Holding
- When filing a workplace discrimination complaint under Title VII of the Civil Rights Act of 1964, the filing period begins only after an employee resigns. The filing period begins at the time that the employee gives notice of resignation, not the effective date of resignation.

Court membership
- Chief Justice John Roberts Associate Justices Anthony Kennedy · Clarence Thomas; Ruth Bader Ginsburg · Stephen Breyer; Samuel Alito · Sonia Sotomayor; Elena Kagan

Case opinions
- Majority: Sotomayor, joined by Roberts, Kennedy, Ginsburg, Breyer, Kagan
- Concurrence: Alito (in judgment)
- Dissent: Thomas

Laws applied
- Title VII of the Civil Rights Act of 1964

Green v. Brennan, 578 U.S. 547 (2016), was a United States Supreme Court case in which the Court held that when filing a workplace discrimination complaint under Title VII of the Civil Rights Act of 1964, the filing period begins only after an employee resigns. The filing period begins at the time that the employee gives notice of resignation, not the effective date of resignation.

== Background ==
Marvin Green was denied a promotion at the United States Postal Service. He alleged that he was denied the promotion because he was black and U.S.P.S. counter-alleged that Green had engaged in the crime of intentionally delaying the mail.

== Opinion of the Court ==
Associate Justice Sonia Sotomayor authored the Court's decision.
