= RJR Nabisco, Inc. v. European Community =

- Supreme Court of the United States

Argued March 21, 2016 Decided June 20, 2016
- Full case name: RJR Nabisco, Inc., et al. v. European Community et al.
- Docket no.: 15-138
- Citations: 579 U.S. ___ (more) 136 S. Ct. 2090; 195 L. Ed. 2d 476

Holding
- A violation of 18 U.S.C. § 1962 of the Racketeer Influenced and Corrupt Organizations Act may be based on a pattern of racketeering that includes predicate offenses committed abroad, provided that each of those offenses violates a predicate statute that is itself extraterritorial. However, a private RICO plaintiff must allege and prove a domestic injury.

Court membership
- Chief Justice John Roberts Associate Justices Anthony Kennedy · Clarence Thomas; Ruth Bader Ginsburg · Stephen Breyer; Samuel Alito · Sonia Sotomayor; Elena Kagan

Case opinions
- Majority: Alito, joined by Roberts, Kennedy, Thomas; Ginsburg, Breyer, Kagan (Parts I, II, and III)
- Concur/dissent: Ginsburg, joined by Breyer, Kagan
- Concur/dissent: Breyer
- Sotomayor took no part in the consideration or decision of the case.

RJR Nabisco, Inc. v. European Community, 579 U.S. ___ (2016), was a United States Supreme Court case in which the Court held that the Racketeer Influenced and Corrupt Organizations Act has certain extraterritorial applications, but that plaintiffs must prove injuries within the United States for the Act to apply. The decision received criticism in the Harvard Law Review for potentially restricting access to American courts for litigants from outside the country.

The case was brought by the European Union's member states. RJR Nabisco (and several subsidiary organizations) were accused of engaging in cigarette smuggling and tax evasion.

== See also ==
- List of United States Supreme Court cases
- List of United States Supreme Court cases, volume 579
- List of United States Supreme Court cases by the Roberts Court
