= Betterman v. Montana =

- Supreme Court of the United States

Argued March 28, 2016 Decided May 19, 2016
- Full case name: Brandon Thomas Betterman, Petitioner v. Montana
- Docket no.: 14-1457
- Citations: 578 U.S. 437 (more) 136 S. Ct. 1609; 194 L. Ed. 2d 723
- Opinion announcement: Opinion announcement

Case history
- Prior: State v. Betterman, 2015 MT 39, 378 Mont. 182, 342 P.3d 971; cert. granted, 136 S. Ct. 582 (2015).

Holding
- The Sixth Amendment's speedy trial guarantee does not apply once a defendant has been found guilty at trial or has pleaded guilty to criminal charges.

Court membership
- Chief Justice John Roberts Associate Justices Anthony Kennedy · Clarence Thomas; Ruth Bader Ginsburg · Stephen Breyer; Samuel Alito · Sonia Sotomayor; Elena Kagan

Case opinions
- Majority: Ginsburg, joined by unanimous
- Concurrence: Thomas, joined by Alito
- Concurrence: Sotomayor

Laws applied
- U.S. Const. amend. VI

Betterman v. Montana, 578 U.S. 437 (2016), was a United States Supreme Court case which held that the right to a speedy trial does not guarantee the right to speedy sentencing. It was decided on May 19, 2016.

== Background ==
Brandon T. Betterman was charged with an assault on a family member in 2011, but failed to show up at a Montana court room. In April 2012, Betterman pleaded guilty to jumping bail. He spent 14 months in a county jail in Montana while waiting for his sentence. In the summer of 2013, the judge sentenced him to seven years in prison, with four years suspended. Betterman ultimately appealed his case to the Supreme Court of the United States, where argued that holding him in the county jail for 14 months violated his constitutional rights, because the right to a speedy trial guaranteed under the Speedy Trial Clause of the Sixth Amendment extended to speedy sentencing.

== Opinion of the Court ==
In a unanimous 8–0 ruling, the Montana Supreme Court's decision was upheld. Associate Justice Ruth Bader Ginsburg wrote the decision in an 11-page opinion. The right to a speedy trial, she wrote is "a measure protecting the presumptively innocent" that "loses force upon conviction." The status of "accused" precedes and is different from the status of "conviction," a distinction that the opinion found support for in the legal writings of Edward Coke and William Blackstone. Other potential remedies were not available to Betterman because he "did not preserve a due process challenge."

Justice Sotomayor wrote a concurring opinion regarding "the correct test for a Due Process Clause delayed sentencing challenge." Justice Thomas also wrote a concurring opinion, responding to Sotomayor, and saying that the Court should not "prejudge" the Due Process Clause issue.

== See also ==
- List of United States Supreme Court cases
- Lists of United States Supreme Court cases by volume
- List of United States Supreme Court cases by the Roberts Court
