= Luis v. United States =

- Supreme Court of the United States

Argued November 10, 2015 Decided March 30, 2016
- Full case name: Sila Luis v. United States
- Docket no.: 14-419
- Citations: 578 U.S. 5 (more) 136 S. Ct. 1083; 194 L. Ed. 2d 256

Case history
- Prior: United States v. Luis, 966 F. Supp. 2d 1321 (S.D. Fla. 2013); affirmed, 564 F. App'x 493 (11th Cir. 2014); cert. granted, 135 S. Ct. 2798 (2015).

Holding
- Pre-trial restraint of untainted assets needed to retain a counsel of the defendant's choice violates the Sixth Amendment. The judgment of the Court of Appeals for the Eleventh Circuit vacated and remanded.

Court membership
- Chief Justice John Roberts Associate Justices Anthony Kennedy · Clarence Thomas; Ruth Bader Ginsburg · Stephen Breyer; Samuel Alito · Sonia Sotomayor; Elena Kagan

Case opinions
- Plurality: Breyer, joined by Roberts, Ginsburg, Sotomayor
- Concurrence: Thomas (in judgment)
- Dissent: Kennedy, joined by Alito
- Dissent: Kagan

Laws applied
- U.S. Const. amend. VI

Luis v. United States, 578 U.S. 5 (2016), was a case in which the Supreme Court of the United States held that the Sixth Amendment to the United States Constitution prohibits the pre-trial restraint of assets needed to retain a defendant's counsel of choice when those assets have not been used in conjunction with criminal activity.

== Background ==
United States federal law allows courts to freeze a criminal defendant's assets when that individual is accused of violating federal banking or healthcare laws. However, assets may only be seized if they are "traceable to the crime" or if the property is "obtained as a result" of the crime and the defendant is either in the process of disposing or alienating those assets or the defendant intends to dispose of or alienate those assets in the future. To freeze these assets, the Attorney General of the United States is authorized to initiate civil proceedings to obtain a restraining order that freezes these assets or "any such property or property of equivalent value". In 2012, Luis Sila was charged by a federal grand jury of committing various health care crimes. Federal prosecutors claimed that Luis fraudulently procured nearly $45 million; prosecutors alleged that Luis spent most of the money she had acquired. In an attempt to preserve the $2 million remaining in her account for the payment of restitution and penalties, prosecutors applied for a pre-trial order that would prevent Luis from spending any of the remaining $2 million. The United States District Court for the Southern District of Florida approved the prosecutors' request and granted an order that prohibited Luis from "dissipating" her assets "up to the equivalent value of the proceeds of the Federal health care fraud ($45 million)".

Both Luis and federal prosecutors conceded that the court's order restrained assets that were entirely unrelated to the alleged criminal activity and that the order prevented Luis from hiring the attorney of her choice to defend her at her criminal trial. In its ruling, the district court also recognized that the order would prevent Luis from hiring the attorney of her choice, but the court stated that "there is no Sixth Amendment right to use untainted, substitute assets to hire counsel", and the United States Court of Appeals for the Eleventh Circuit affirmed the district court's ruling in a per curiam decision. Citing Caplin & Drysdale, Chartered v. United States and United States v. Monsanto, the Eleventh Circuit held that the Supreme Court of the United States's criminal forfeiture jurisprudence foreclosed constitutional challenges to the seizure of untainted assets. Luis appealed the Eleventh Circuit's decision, and the Supreme Court granted certiorari to review the case.

== Opinion of the Court ==
Writing for a plurality of the Court, Justice Stephen Breyer held that "the pretrial restraint of legitimate, untainted assets needed to retain counsel of choice violates the Sixth Amendment". In an opinion concurring in the judgment, Justice Clarence Thomas concluded that "the Sixth Amendment prevents the Government from freezing untainted assets in order to secure a potential forfeiture". Justice Anthony Kennedy wrote a dissenting opinion in which he argued that the plurality opinion and Justice Thomas's opinion both "[create] perverse incentives and [provide] protection for defendants who spend stolen money rather than their own". Justice Elena Kagan also wrote a dissenting opinion in which she stated that "I am not altogether convinced that ... the Government’s interest in recovering the proceeds of crime ought to trump the defendant’s (often highly consequential) right to retain counsel of choice", but ultimately concluded that United States v. Monsanto should control the outcome of the case because Luis never asked the Court to overrule Monsanto in her arguments before the Court.

== Commentary and analysis ==
In her analysis of the case for SCOTUSblog, Amy Howe wrote that "it’s not clear how significant the effect of this decision will actually be" because the government can still "use tracing rules to distinguish between tainted and untainted assets when the two are intermingled". Mark Joseph Stern described the case as "triumph for the right to counsel, at a time when it is in desperate need of a win" and wrote that the Court's decision "send[s] a clear message that the Sixth Amendment’s Assistance of Counsel provision remains robust". In a review of the case for Esquire, Charles P. Pierce praised the Court's decision and wrote that "my every instinct tells me that the Supreme Court shouldn't have to [declare that the government cannot] pauperize a criminal defendant".
