= Offer of judgment =

The Offer of Judgment rule is a United States tort reform law aimed at controlling unnecessary litigation and at encouraging settlement. Under this rule, if a settlement offer designated as an offer of judgment is made in civil litigation, the offer is rejected and the final court decision is less favorable than the final offer that was made, then the party who rejected the offer is subject to certain penalties. The same principle can be found in the Calderbank offer jurisprudence in England.

== Usage ==
The penalties vary by state, but often include some combination of an award to the other party of certain attorneys' fees, compensable litigation costs and prejudgment interest. Most jurisdictions limit these awards to fees, costs and interest accumulated after the offer is made or rejected. In addition, the party who rejected the offer may lose their entitlement to certain attorneys' fees, compensable litigation costs and prejudgment interest. Here again, most jurisdictions provide that the party who rejected the offer loses no more than their entitlement to the attorneys' fees, costs and interest incurred after the making or rejection of the settlement offer.

The rule is not applicable in divorce proceedings or child custody proceedings.

== History ==
This rule was first introduced in a number of states in the late 19th and early 20th centuries, subsequently adopted in 1938 in the Federal Rules of Civil Procedure, and is currently designated as Rule 68 of the Federal Rules of Civil Procedure. Many states have modified the rule by varying degrees. A survey of state Offer of Judgement Provisions has been compiled by the American College of Trial Lawyers and indicates the use by each state. In the U.S. state of Maryland the rule is only applicable to medical malpractice cases.

This rule became law in the U.S. state of Georgia on 27 April 2006. In Georgia, the threshold was set such that the final court decision must be no more than 25% less favorable than the last settlement offer or the rejector becomes liable for attorney fees. However, the Georgia Supreme Court struck the statute down in 2007, on the ground that it purported to act retroactively and was therefore unconstitutional. A new version of the statute survived subsequent challenge and is now law.

The Nevada Supreme Court's 1998 adoption of a replacement offer of judgment rule in NRCP 68 introduced a tremendous degree of flexibility to parties that choose to serve offers of judgment. This high degree of flexibility is unique to Nevada, and it has greatly complicated Nevada's offer of judgment law. In departing from prior law and from the practice in every other state, the 1998 Rule allows for the following: unapportioned offers of judgment may be served to multiple parties under limited circumstances; any unrelated parties may serve an unapportioned offer to any party; a party may draft an offer for a lump sum or for an amount that includes any combination of costs, attorneys' fees and interest; a party may draft an offer that apportions the offered amounts by claim; a party (or multiple parties) may serve an apportioned offer to multiple parties that includes a condition that it be accepted by all parties; and a party may proceed to trial but shield itself from offer of judgment penalties by "accepting" an apportioned offer of judgment that is conditioned by the acceptance of all parties where all parties do not accept.
