= Army Corps of Engineers v. Hawkes Co. =

- Supreme Court of the United States

Argued March 30, 2016 Decided May 31, 2016
- Full case name: United States Army Corps of Engineers v. Hawkes Co., Inc., et al.
- Docket no.: 15-290
- Citations: 578 U.S. 590 (more) 136 S. Ct. 1807; 195 L. Ed. 2d 77
- Argument: Oral argument
- Opinion announcement: Opinion announcement

Case history
- Prior: Motion to dismiss granted, 963 F. Supp. 2d 868 (D. Minn. 2013); reversed, 782 F.3d 994 (8th Cir. 2015); cert. granted, 136 S. Ct. 615 (2015).

Holding
- A Clean Water Act jurisdictional determination issued by the United States Army Corps of Engineers is reviewable under the Administrative Procedure Act because jurisdictional determinations constitute final agency action.

Court membership
- Chief Justice John Roberts Associate Justices Anthony Kennedy · Clarence Thomas; Ruth Bader Ginsburg · Stephen Breyer; Samuel Alito · Sonia Sotomayor; Elena Kagan

Case opinions
- Majority: Roberts, joined by Kennedy, Thomas, Breyer, Alito, Sotomayor, Kagan
- Concurrence: Kennedy, joined by Thomas, Alito
- Concurrence: Kagan
- Concurrence: Ginsburg (in part)

Laws applied
- Administrative Procedure Act, 5 U.S.C. § 704

Army Corps of Engineers v. Hawkes Co., 578 U.S. 590 (2016), was a case in which the Supreme Court of the United States held that a Clean Water Act jurisdictional determination issued by the United States Army Corps of Engineers is reviewable under the Administrative Procedure Act because jurisdictional determinations constitute "final agency action". For a federal agency decision or action to be reviewable in court under the Administrative Procedure Act, it must be a “final” agency action, meaning that there are no further steps that can be taken before it has an impact on the legal rights or obligations of any affected parties.

== Background ==
The Clean Water Act prohibits the discharge of pollutants into "waters of the United States" without a valid permit. “Waters of the United States” is a legal term defined in 40 CFR 230.3(s) that means a water body or wetland that is under the jurisdiction of the United States Army Corps of Engineers because of its impact on interstate commerce. Because it is sometimes difficult to determine whether property contains waters of the United States, the United States Army Corps of Engineers issues jurisdictional determinations (on a case-by-case basis) that specify whether property contains waters of the United States. In this case, the United States Army Corps of Engineers issued a jurisdictional determination, which stated that property owned by peat mine operators in Marshall County, Minnesota included waters of the United States because it contained wetlands that "had a 'significant nexus' to the Red River of the North". The mine operators filed suit to challenge the Corps's jurisdictional determination under the Administrative Procedure Act, but the district court ruled that it could not exercise subject matter jurisdiction because the jurisdictional determination did not constitute "final agency action". The United States Court of Appeals for the Eighth Circuit reversed the district court's ruling, and the Supreme Court of the United States granted certiorari to review the case.

== Opinion of the Court ==
In a majority opinion written by Chief Justice John Roberts, the Supreme Court rejected The Corps’ contentions that the jurisdictional determination “is not ”final agency action” and that, even if it were, there are adequate alternatives for challenging it in court." Justice Anthony Kennedy wrote a concurring opinion in which he was joined by Justice Clarence Thomas and Justice Samuel Alito, where he argued that "the Court is right to construe a [jurisdictional determination] as binding in light of the fact that in many instances it will have a significant bearing on whether the Clean Water Act comports with due process." Justice Elena Kagan also wrote a separate concurring opinion in which she argued that jurisdictional determinations are reviewable because "legal consequences will flow" from the Corps' determinations. Justice Ruth Bader Ginsburg wrote a separate opinion concurring in part and concurring in the judgment in which she argued that there was nothing tentative or informal about jurisdictional determinations, and that the Corps' determinations have "an immediate and practical impact."

== See also ==
- List of United States Supreme Court cases
- Lists of United States Supreme Court cases by volume
- List of United States Supreme Court cases by the Roberts Court
