= Campbell-Ewald Co. v. Gomez =

- Supreme Court of the United States

Argued October 14, 2015 Decided January 20, 2016
- Full case name: Campbell-Ewald Company, Petitioner v. Jose Gomez
- Docket no.: 14–857
- Citations: 577 U.S. 153 (more) 136 S. Ct. 663; 193 L. Ed. 2d 571

Case history
- Prior: On Writ of Certiorari to the United States Court of Appeals for the Ninth Circuit

Court membership
- Chief Justice John Roberts Associate Justices Antonin Scalia · Anthony Kennedy; Clarence Thomas · Ruth Bader Ginsburg; Stephen Breyer · Samuel Alito; Sonia Sotomayor · Elena Kagan

Case opinions
- Majority: Ginsburg, joined by Kennedy, Breyer, Sotomayor, Kagan
- Concurrence: Thomas (in judgment)
- Dissent: Roberts, joined by Scalia, Alito
- Dissent: Alito

Laws applied
- Fed. R. Civ. P. 68

Campbell-Ewald Co. v. Gomez, 577 U.S. 153 (2016), was a case in which the Supreme Court of the United States clarified whether a case becomes moot when a party provides a settlement offer that satisfies a named plaintiff's claims in a class action suit and whether a government contractor is entitled to "derivative sovereign immunity".

== Background ==
=== Telephone Consumer Protection Act ===
The Telephone Consumer Protection Act of 1991 prohibits individuals from sending unsolicited telephonic communications. Specifically, the Act prohibits individuals from "mak[ing] any call" or "using any automatic telephone dialing system" to contact a telephone number assigned to a cellular telephone service without the prior consent. A text message is considered the equivalent of a "call" under the Act. Private citizens may file a lawsuit against individuals who violate the act. If successful, plaintiffs may recover $500 for each violation or their "actual monetary loss" (whichever is greater), and damages may be tripled if the defendant "knowingly" or "willfully" violated the Act.

=== Gomez's class action claim ===
In the year 2000, the United States Navy contracted with the Campbell-Ewald marketing company to develop a multimedia military recruiting campaign. Beginning in 2005, Campbell proposed a campaign where young adults would receive text messages; the Navy agreed to implement the program on the condition that the messages would only be sent to "individuals who had 'opted in' to receipt of marketing solicitations on topics that included service in the Navy." Campbell then generated a list of 100,000 cellular phone numbers that they believed were owned by young adults "between the ages of 18 and 24 who had consented to receiving solicitations by text message." In May 2006, Campbell authorized the transmission of a text message to those phone numbers, which encouraged individuals to learn more about service in the Navy. Jose Gomez received the text message, but he alleged that he never consented to receive the message. He then filed a class action lawsuit in the United States District Court for the Central District of California on behalf of a nationwide class of individuals who had received the text message, but had not previously consented to its delivery. The suit alleged that Campbell's transmission of the text message violated the Telephone Consumer Protection Act of 1991.

Gomez's lawsuit claimed costs and attorneys fees, which he claimed should be tripled in light of Campbell's conduct, as well as an injunction to prevent future unsolicited messaging. Before Gomez's class was certified, Campbell proposed a settlement (pursuant to Federal Rule of Civil Procedure 68), which offered to pay Gomez's costs and $1503.00 for every text message that he could prove that he received, but they did not agree to pay attorneys fees. After Gomez rejected this settlement offer, Campbell filed a motion to dismiss on the basis that the case was now moot because the settlement offer provided Gomez complete relief. The district court denied the motion and allowed class action claims to proceed. Prior to trial, Campbell filed a separate motion for summary judgment, claiming that it was entitled to sovereign immunity "as a contractor acting on the Navy's behalf." The district court granted the motion, but on appeal, the United States Court of Appeals for the Ninth Circuit revered the district court's ruling. In 2015, the Supreme Court granted certiorari to resolve a circuit split about whether a complete settlement offer can cause a case to become moot.

== Opinion of the Court ==
In a majority opinion written by Justice Ruth Bader Ginsburg, the Court held that "an unaccepted settlement offer has no force" and, under Federal Rule of Civil Procedure 68, it does not render a lawsuit moot. Additionally, Justice Ginsburg held that the government contractor in this case was not entitled to derivative sovereign immunity.

== See also ==
- List of United States Supreme Court cases
- Lists of United States Supreme Court cases by volume
- List of United States Supreme Court cases by the Roberts Court
