= Puerto Rico v. Sanchez Valle =

- Supreme Court of the United States

Argued January 13, 2016 Decided June 9, 2016
- Full case name: Commonwealth of Puerto Rico, Petitioner v. Luis M. Sanchez Valle, et al.
- Docket no.: 15-108
- Citations: 579 U.S. 59 (more) 136 S. Ct. 1863; 195 L. Ed. 2d 179

Case history
- Prior: Pueblo v. Sanchez Valle, 192 D.P.R. 594, 2015 TSPR 25 (Mar. 20, 2015); cert. granted, 136 S. Ct. 28 (2015).

Holding
- The dual sovereignty doctrine does not apply to the U.S. territory of Puerto Rico. Therefore, the Double Jeopardy Clause bars Puerto Rico and the United States from successively prosecuting a single person for the same conduct under equivalent criminal laws.

Court membership
- Chief Justice John Roberts Associate Justices Anthony Kennedy · Clarence Thomas; Ruth Bader Ginsburg · Stephen Breyer; Samuel Alito · Sonia Sotomayor; Elena Kagan

Case opinions
- Majority: Kagan, joined by Roberts, Kennedy, Ginsburg, Alito
- Concurrence: Ginsburg, joined by Thomas
- Concurrence: Thomas (in part)
- Dissent: Breyer, joined by Sotomayor

Laws applied
- U.S. Const. amend. V; Puerto Rico Arms Act of 2000

Puerto Rico v. Sanchez Valle, 579 U.S. 59 (2016), is a criminal case that came before the Supreme Court of the United States, which considered whether Puerto Rico and the federal government of the United States are separate sovereigns for purposes of the Double Jeopardy Clause of the United States Constitution.

In essence, the clause establishes that an individual cannot be tried for the same offense twice under the same sovereignty.

The petitioner claimed that Puerto Rico has a different sovereignty because of its political status while others claimed that it does not, including the respondent, the Supreme Court of Puerto Rico, and the solicitor general of the United States.

In a 6–2 decision, the Court affirmed that the Double Jeopardy Clause bars Puerto Rico and the United States from successively prosecuting the same person for the same conduct under equivalent criminal laws.

The decision was affirmed 6-2 in an opinion by Justice Kagan on June 9, 2016. Justice Ginsburg filed a concurring opinion in which Justice Thomas joined. Justice Thomas filed an opinion, concurring in part and concurring in the judgment.

Justice Breyer filed a dissenting opinion in which Justice Sotomayor joined.

== Political implications ==
The argument appears to diminish the independent authority to prosecute criminal laws that the government of Puerto Rico thought that it had since the Puerto Rico Federal Relations Act of 1950 and subsequent ratification of the Constitution of Puerto Rico in 1952.

== See also ==
- Insular Cases
- PROMESA
