= Gobeille v. Liberty Mutual Insurance Co. =

- Supreme Court of the United States

Argued December 2, 2015 Decided March 1, 2016
- Full case name: Alfred Gobeille, in his Official Capacity as Chair of the Vermont Green Mountain Care Board, Petitioner v. Liberty Mutual Insurance Company
- Docket no.: 14-181
- Citations: 577 U.S. ___ (more) 136 S. Ct. 936; 194 L. Ed. 2d 20
- Opinion announcement: Opinion announcement

Case history
- Prior: Liberty Mut. Ins. Co. v. Donegan, 746 F.3d 497 (2d Cir. 2014)

Court membership
- Chief Justice John Roberts Associate Justices Anthony Kennedy · Clarence Thomas; Ruth Bader Ginsburg · Stephen Breyer; Samuel Alito · Sonia Sotomayor; Elena Kagan

Case opinions
- Majority: Kennedy, joined by Roberts, Thomas, Breyer, Alito, Kagan
- Concurrence: Thomas
- Concurrence: Breyer
- Dissent: Ginsburg, joined by Sotomayor

Laws applied
- Employee Retirement Income Security Act, 29 U.S.C. § 1001 et seq.

Gobeille v. Liberty Mutual Insurance Co., 577 U.S. ___ (2016), was a United States Supreme Court case in which the Court held that a Vermont state law requiring the disclosure of certain information relating to health care services was preempted by the Employee Retirement Income Security Act (ERISA) to the extent that the state law applied to ERISA plans. Writing for a majority of the Court, Justice Anthony Kennedy held that the Vermont law "impose[d] duties that are inconsistent with the central design of ERISA, which is to provide a single uniform national scheme for the administration of ERISA plans without interference from laws of the several States".
