= Mathis v. United States =

- Supreme Court of the United States

Decided June 23, 2016
- Full case name: Mathis v. United States
- Docket no.: 15-6092
- Citations: 579 U.S. 500 (more)

Holding
- If a state law defines a crime more broadly than the common understanding of that crime, a conviction under that state law cannot be used as a sentencing enhancement under the federal Armed Career Criminal Act.

Court membership
- Chief Justice John Roberts Associate Justices Anthony Kennedy · Clarence Thomas; Ruth Bader Ginsburg · Stephen Breyer; Samuel Alito · Sonia Sotomayor; Elena Kagan

Case opinions
- Majority: Kagan, joined by Roberts, Kennedy, Thomas, Sotomayor
- Concurrence: Kennedy
- Concurrence: Thomas
- Dissent: Breyer, joined by Ginsburg
- Dissent: Alito

Laws applied
- Armed Career Criminal Act

Mathis v. United States, 579 U.S. 500 (2016), was a United States Supreme Court case in which the Court held that if a state law defines a crime more broadly than the common understanding of that crime, a conviction under that state law cannot be used as a sentencing enhancement under the federal Armed Career Criminal Act.

== Description ==
The conviction at issue was under Iowa's burglary law, which criminalized unlawful entry into "any building, structure, [or] land, water, or air vehicle." To the Court, the common understanding of "burglary" was unlawful entry into a "building or other structure."
