= Hollingsworth v. Perry =

Series of U.S. federal court cases that reinstated same-sex marriage in California

- Supreme Court of the United States

Argued March 26, 2013 Decided June 26, 2013
- Full case name: Dennis Hollingsworth, et al., Petitioners v. Kristin M. Perry, et al.
- Docket no.: 12-144
- Citations: 570 U.S. 693 (more) 133 S. Ct. 2652; 186 L. Ed. 2d 768
- Argument: Oral argument

Case history
- Prior: Judgment for plaintiffs, Perry v. Schwarzenegger, 704 F. Supp. 2d 921 (N.D. Cal. 2010); Certified question, 628 F.3d 1191 (9th. Cir. 2011); Answered, Perry v. Brown, 52 Cal.4th 1116 (2011); Affirmed, 671 F.3d 1052 (9th Cir. 2012); Cert. granted, 568 U.S. 1066 (2012).

Holding
- Opponents of same-sex marriage do not have standing to intervene in litigation about the constitutionality of same-sex marriage because they cannot demonstrate that they are harmed by a court's decision about it.

Court membership
- Chief Justice John Roberts Associate Justices Antonin Scalia · Anthony Kennedy; Clarence Thomas · Ruth Bader Ginsburg; Stephen Breyer · Samuel Alito; Sonia Sotomayor · Elena Kagan

Case opinions
- Majority: Roberts, joined by Scalia, Ginsburg, Breyer, Kagan
- Dissent: Kennedy, joined by Thomas, Alito, Sotomayor

Laws applied
- U.S. Const. Art. III

Hollingsworth v. Perry was a series of United States federal court cases that reinstated same-sex marriage in the state of California. The case began in 2009 in the U.S. District Court for the Northern District of California, which found that banning same-sex marriage violates equal protection under the law. This decision overturned California ballot initiative Proposition 8, which had banned same-sex marriage. After the State of California refused to defend Proposition 8, the official sponsors of Proposition 8 intervened and appealed to the Supreme Court. The case was litigated during the governorships of both Arnold Schwarzenegger and Jerry Brown, and was thus known as Perry v. Schwarzenegger and Perry v. Brown, respectively. As Hollingsworth v. Perry, it eventually reached the United States Supreme Court, which held that, in line with prior precedent, the official sponsors of a ballot initiative measure did not have Article III standing to appeal an adverse federal court ruling when the state refused to do so. The effect of the ruling was that same-sex marriage in California resumed under the district court trial decision from 2010.

== Background ==
In May 2008, the California Supreme Court held in the case In re Marriage Cases that state statutes limiting marriage to opposite-sex applicants violated the California Constitution. The following month, same-sex couples became able to marry in California. In November 2008, California's voters approved Proposition 8, an amendment to the state constitution that sought to restore a prior opposite-sex-couple limitation on marriage; but following its adoption, several lawsuits were filed that challenged the validity of the amendment, under various state constitutional provisions. On May 26, 2009, the California Supreme Court held, in Strauss v. Horton that (while Proposition 8 was a lawful enactment), all same-sex marriages that had been contracted before the proposition's passage remained valid.

The National Center for Lesbian Rights, Lambda Legal and American Civil Liberties Union had originally obtained the right to same-sex marriage in California, in In re Marriage Cases, and defended it in Strauss v. Horton. Three days before the Strauss decision occurred, the American Foundation for Equal Rights (AFER) filed suit in the U.S. District Court for the Northern District of California, to challenge the validity of Proposition 8 on behalf of two same-sex couples. The couples' legal team was led by David Boies and former U.S. Solicitor General Theodore Olson (who, incidentally, had previously represented opposite parties in Bush v. Gore, with Boies representing Al Gore and Olson representing George W. Bush, the case that, effectively, decided the 2000 U.S. presidential election). In the 2010 Time 100, they were listed, for "their nonpartisan and strong legal approach to challenging Proposition 8."

Lambda Legal and the American Civil Liberties Union (ACLU) opposed the filing because they felt a federal challenge at this time might do more harm than good. Olson and AFER rebuffed this argument and defended the timing of the lawsuit. Following a pre-trial hearing on July 2, 2009, the three legal groups moved to intervene in the lawsuit, as did the City of San Francisco in a separate filing. The plaintiffs opposed allowing the groups or the city to intervene. On August 19, Judge Walker denied the legal groups' motions to intervene, but granted the City's, albeit in a limited capacity. Despite the other groups' failed attempt to intervene in the lawsuit, they offered support to the legal team litigating the case, with James Esseks of the ACLU saying: "We are interested in doing whatever we can to make sure their case is as successful as possible".

== Parties ==
=== Plaintiffs ===
It was still emotional to be denied [a marriage license]. But in all fairness [to the clerk], she handled it really well. [Her words] reiterated that we were denied equal rights. It made us feel that we made the right decision to be a part of this case.

— Jeffrey Zarrillo, co-plaintiff

In May 2009, the Alameda County Clerk-Registrar, Patrick O'Connell, denied Kristin Perry and Sandra Stier a marriage license because they are a same-sex couple. For the same reason, Dean Logan, the Los Angeles County Clerk, denied Paul Katami and Jeffrey Zarrillo a marriage license. The couples sued the two county clerks and several state officials: Governor Arnold Schwarzenegger, Attorney General Jerry Brown, and two officials in the Department of Public Health.

Several groups sought to intervene as plaintiffs, including the groups who had prosecuted the actions entitled In re Marriage Cases and Strauss v. Horton. San Francisco also filed a motion to intervene in the case. The City cited its work in the earlier cases that had provided "extensive evidence and proposed findings on strict scrutiny factors and factual rebuttals to long claimed justifications for marriage discrimination". City Attorney Dennis Herrera said that his office is "singularly well-prepared" to help "put anti-gay discrimination on trial based on the facts". Walker permitted only San Francisco to intervene, as it could speak to the impact of Proposition 8 on local governments. He also ordered the attorney general to assist San Francisco in analyzing Proposition 8's impact. Walker stated that necessary speed and swiftness "on an issue of this magnitude and importance" were required and that the intervention of additional groups would only complicate and stall the case.

=== Defendants ===
What's at stake in the Perry case is not just the right of California voters to reaffirm the definition of marriage as only between a man and a woman, but whether marriage will be redefined in every state in the nation.

— ProtectMarriage.com, defendant-intervenor

Attorney General Jerry Brown chose not to defend the lawsuit, saying that Proposition 8 violates the Fourteenth Amendment to the United States Constitution and should be struck down. Governor Arnold Schwarzenegger also declined to participate in the defense but said it was appropriate for the courts to hear the case and "resolve the merits of this action expeditiously" because it "presents important constitutional questions that require and warrant judicial determination." On November 2, 2010, Brown was elected governor and Kamala Harris was elected attorney general. Both ran on platforms promising not to defend the proposition, and the state continued to decline defending Proposition 8 in court after they assumed office.

Two groups, the official proponents of Proposition 8, ProtectMarriage.com, led by then-state-senator Dennis Hollingsworth, and a rival group, the Campaign for California Families, sought to intervene as defendants. The court allowed the official proponents to intervene, filling the void left by the state officials' acquiescence. The judge denied the request from the Campaign for California Families.

On December 15, Imperial County also filed a motion to intervene as a defendant despite the fact that the intervenor deadline had passed. They argued that the civil agencies named in the suit, the counties of Alameda and Los Angeles and the state government, were not actively defending the Proposition. They continued to argue that the case needed a proper governmental defendant. On August 4, along with the ruling, Judge Vaughn Walker denied Imperial County intervenor status.

== District court trial ==
=== Pre-trial motions ===
Plaintiffs filed a motion for a preliminary injunction that would have immediately restored same-sex marriage in California until the lawsuit was decided. Walker deferred a ruling on the motion and said he would instead "proceed directly and expeditiously to the merits".

During discovery, the plaintiffs requested that the campaign produce internal documents that related to the purpose and intent of the amendment and the development of political messages during the campaign. The Proposition 8 proponents objected to the request because of the potential adverse effect on political speech, among other grounds. On October 1, Walker rejected the contention that the First Amendment shielded all of those communications. The proponents appealed that decision to the United States Court of Appeals for the Ninth Circuit and separately moved to stay the proceedings in the district court. Stating that the proponents were unlikely to succeed in this appeal, Walker rejected the stay request on October 23. Regardless, the proponents continued to assert a First Amendment privilege over these documents, a sampling of which Walker reviewed privately. On December 11, 2009, the Ninth Circuit overturned Walker's ruling, saying that the release of the documents "would likely have a chilling effect on political association and the formulation of political expression" in a unanimous opinion by Raymond C. Fisher with Kim McLane Wardlaw and Marsha Berzon.

In September, Proposition 8 proponents filed a motion for summary judgment. Running more than 100 pages, the motion asked the court to rule that Proposition 8 did not offend the U.S. Constitution without the need to find facts at a trial. The motion asserted that Baker v. Nelson foreclosed any further review by the court. Failing that, the motion argued that all of the couples' claims failed as a matter of law. After a two-hour hearing on October 13, Walker denied the motion. He noted that the Supreme Court doctrine on sexual orientation and gender discrimination had changed since 1972. Resolving the amendment's validity, Walker noted, required hearing testimony at trial.

==== Broadcast and online coverage ====
Perry would have been the first federal trial to be filmed and be shown live at public courthouses in San Francisco, Pasadena, Seattle, Portland, and Brooklyn, through an experimental new system developed by the Ninth Circuit. The trial would have also been shown on the video-sharing website YouTube. Walker noted that he had received 138,574 comments on the plans to broadcast the trial, and all but 32 were in favor.

On January 11, 2010, two days before the trial, the defendant-intervenors filed emergency papers with Supreme Court Circuit Justice Anthony Kennedy to bar telecasting the trial, with the court ruling 8–1 to temporarily stay live streaming until January 13, with the lone dissenter being Stephen Breyer. Although a coalition of media organizations, including CNN, Fox News, the Associated Press, and Court TV, filed an emergency amicus brief in support of live streaming and delayed broadcast, the court passed an unsigned 5–4 ruling in Hollingsworth v. Perry to indefinitely block live streams to various federal courthouses, although it refused to rule on plans to delay broadcasts on YouTube. A dissenting opinion by Breyer that was joined by John Paul Stevens, Ruth Bader Ginsburg, and Sonia Sotomayor reveals that the majority was formed by John Roberts, Antonin Scalia, Anthony Kennedy, Clarence Thomas, and Samuel Alito.

Despite the ruling, the proceedings elicited unprecedented live coverage through social networking site Twitter from the gay-interest magazine The Advocate, the National Center for Lesbian Rights, an official feed from the group representing the plaintiffs (AFER), a California-based progressive organization Courage Campaign, and several independent parties including Chris Geidner, maintainer of the LGBT-oriented Law Dork blog, San Francisco-based attorney Chris Stoll, and others. Filmmakers John Ireland and John Ainsworth filmed and distributed a re-enactment of the trial. Actors participating in the project include Adrienne Barbeau, Arye Gross, and Tess Harper.

=== Hearing ===
In scheduling a trial for January 11, 2010, to gather facts about the case, Walker largely surprised both the plaintiffs and defendants. The trial was intended to address issues such as how having same-sex parents affects children, whether same-sex marriages undermine opposite-sex marriages, the history of discrimination against gays, and the effects of prejudice against gays. Notable trial witnesses included historian George Chauncey, psychologist Gregory M. Herek, and philosopher Daniel N. Robinson.

The trial began with opening statements by Theodore Olson and San Francisco Deputy City Attorney Therese Stewart for the plaintiffs. The plaintiffs sought to show that marriage is a fundamental right; that depriving gays and lesbians of the right to marry hurts them and their children; and that there was no reason or societal benefit in prohibiting them from getting married. Charles J. Cooper made an opening statement for the defendants, saying that marriage had been universally limited to opposite-sex couples. The plaintiffs then testified about their personal experiences as gay Americans, and the reasons why they wished to marry.

Following the Supreme Court's decision in Christian Legal Society v. Martinez on June 28, 2010, the plaintiffs in Perry cited the decision by Justice Ginsburg as Supreme Court precedent that sexual orientation is "an identifiable class" in opposition to the defense's argument that sexual orientation is "behavioral". Christian Legal Society had asserted that it did not restrict membership based on sexual orientation but based on "conduct and belief that the conduct is not wrong". Ginsburg rejected that distinction, noting that with respect to sexual orientation the court has "declined to distinguish between status and conduct" and offering an analogy from an earlier opinion: "A tax on wearing yarmulkes is a tax on Jews."

=== Testimony ===
==== History of marriage ====
The plaintiffs called expert witness and same-sex marriage advocate Nancy Cott, an American history scholar, who testified that "marriage has never been universally defined as a union of one man and one woman, and that religion has never had any bearing on the legality of a marriage". The next day, she continued her testimony, which revolved around three key points: how marriage has historically been used "punitively" to demean disfavored groups, how the legally enshrined gender roles in marriage had been disestablished during the 20th century and how the changes in the institution of marriage had mainly involved "shedding inequalities", which she said strengthens marriage. She emphasized the importance of the institution of marriage by noting that "when slaves were emancipated, they flocked to get married. And this was not trivial to them, by any means". Cott was then cross-examined by David Thompson, who asked about her personal feelings on same-sex marriage to establish that she was an advocate rather than a dispassionate scholar. Defense counsel argued that marriage has traditionally been between a man and a woman because it provided a stable unit for procreation and child rearing.

==== Discrimination ====
Professor George Chauncey of Yale University, a social historian who specializes in LGBT history, described how previous government campaigns had attempted "to demonize gay people as dangerous sexual deviants and child molesters". He then analyzed campaign material from the Yes on 8 campaign to show how they played upon the same message. He analyzed the words of Dr. William Tam, which included assertions that, were California to fail to pass Proposition 8, other states would follow and "fall into Satan's hands", and that following legalization of same-sex marriage, the advocates of the "gay agenda" would attempt to "legalize having sex with children". Chauncey connected these messages to the earlier history of government demonizing gays and lesbians which he had previously discussed. Helen Zia, a scholar on Asian American social and political movements who was also asked to analyze those words, explained how her encounters with similar Asian community organizers encouraged her to "[step] into the closet and [slam] the door." David Thompson for the defense cross-examined Prof. Chauncey by focusing on the progress that had been made for mainstream acceptance of gays and lesbians in the last twenty years. Thompson noted anti-discrimination laws, support for domestic partnerships, and the proliferation of media like the sitcom Will & Grace and 2005 film Brokeback Mountain. Thompson's line of questioning was intended to establish "whether systemic bias against lesbians and gay men prevents them from being treated by others as equal citizens in the political process".

Professor Gary Segura, a political scientist at Stanford University, said that no other minority groups in America — including undocumented aliens — have been the target of more restrictive ballot initiatives than gay men and lesbians. He accused Proposition 8 of being the type of social stigma that makes "gay and lesbian social progress seem like it comes at expense of other people and organizations and it makes the hill steeper". Under cross-examination, defense witness David Blankenhorn revealed that he believed the principle of equal human dignity applied to gay and lesbian Americans, and that "we would be more American on the day we permitted same-sex marriage than we were on the day before".

Gregory Herek, a professor from the University of California, Davis, contended that "structural stigma" in the form of laws like Proposition 8 directly encourages social stigma, harassment, and violence against LGBT people. He also testified that there is no evidence "conversion therapy" is effective in changing a person's sexuality, and that it "sends a harmful and false message to young people that homosexuality is a disorder", directly leading to more discrimination. During cross-examination, he asserted that "sexual orientation is a combination of attraction, identity, and behavior, and that the complexities researchers face in defining sexual orientation are no different than those they face in defining other characteristics such as race". San Diego Republican mayor Jerry Sanders testified how he transitioned from believing that domestic partnership was an ideal compromise to believing that same-sex marriage was fundamental. "What hit me was that I had been prejudiced", he explained. During cross-examination, he agreed with the defendants that not all people who voted for Proposition 8 were "bigots", but that he believed their vote was "grounded in prejudice".

==== Psychological effects ====
Relationship psychologist Anne Peplau took the stand and argued that individuals gain physical, psychological, and social benefits from being married. Edmund A. Egan, the chief economist for San Francisco, agreed and said that the citizen's improved health would save city emergency health funds. Peplau also argued that the quality and stability of same-sex relationships are similar to those of heterosexual relationships and that permitting same-sex couples to marry will not harm the institution of marriage in any way. She was cross-examined by Nicole Moss, who asked Peplau about the differences between same-sex and opposite-sex relationships, but Peplau reiterated there are no significant differences. The plaintiffs also called forward Dr. Ilan H. Meyer, senior scholar of public policy at the Williams Institute on Sexual Orientation Law and Public Policy at the UCLA School of Law, to testify on the mental and psychological harms of being denied the right to marry. "Young children do not aspire to be domestic partners, marriage is a common, socially approved goal," he said. He then explained the effects of minority stress on gays and lesbians.

==== Parenting ====
Examining the impact of same-sex marriage on children, the plaintiffs introduced Michael Lamb, a developmental psychologist at the University of Cambridge. He contended that there is a fairly substantial body of literature since the late 1970s that focuses specifically on the adjustment of children parented by gay men and lesbians which provides very good understanding of the factors that affect the adjustment of children being raised by gay and lesbian parents. This substantial body of evidence documents that children raised by gay and lesbian parents are just as likely to be well adjusted as children raised by heterosexual parents. He noted that for significant number of these children, their adjustment would be promoted were their parents able to get married. He added that a field of developmental psychology came to the conclusion that what makes for an effective parent is the same both for a mother or a father, and that children do not need to have a masculine-behaving parent figure, a father, or feminine-behaving parent figure, a mother, in order to be well adjusted. Testimony showed that California was supportive of same-sex couple adoption and viewed it positively, providing testimony of both the state's experience of same-sex couples and parenting, which was not changed by Proposition 8. Defense witness David Blankenhorn, under cross-examination, concurred that the well-being of children raised by same-sex couples would improve should they be allowed to marry.

==== Economics ====
In an exploration on the economics of Proposition 8, the plaintiffs called forward Edmund A. Egan, the chief economist for San Francisco. He testified that same-sex marriage would aid the city because "married individuals tend to accumulate more wealth than single individuals" and that "married individuals are healthier on average and behave themselves in healthier ways than single individuals", saving the city from paying emergency room bills and insurance funds. He also testified that San Francisco's revenue would increase if same-sex marriage were legal, citing the period in 2008 when 5,100 marriage licenses were issued. He estimated that the city of San Francisco was losing out on $37.2 million in retail and hotel spending and $2.5 million in sales and hotel tax revenue each year.

San Francisco Attorney Therese Stewart noted in the closing arguments that the city itself was uniquely losing out on potential profits because Proposition 8 dissuaded gay tourists and their families from visiting the "cool, gray city of love" (as Walker referred to it) to get married. She also argued, through testimony by Ryan Kendall and Meyer, that the city was burdened with higher incidents of mental health disorders and the subsequent costs to the public health system.

==== Political strength ====
The defense called Professor Kenneth P. Miller from Claremont McKenna College to testify that LGBT people had strong political and social support within California. He argued that all the major newspapers, Hollywood, Silicon Valley, and a majority of state politicians all strongly opposed Proposition 8. During cross-examination of George Chauncey, the defense claimed that LGBT people have enjoyed increased political and social clout, with increased acceptance by society as exemplified by films such as Brokeback Mountain. Chauncey also admitted that employers in California are forbidden to discriminate on grounds of sexual orientation. On the basis of these testimonies, the defense was arguing that homosexuals do not qualify as a special oppressed minority class in need of the court's protection.

=== District court opinion ===
Today's decision is by no means California's first milestone, nor our last, on America's road to equality and freedom for all people.

— Governor Arnold Schwarzenegger, defendant, reacting to Judge Walker's ruling on August 4, 2010

Judge Walker heard closing arguments on June 16, 2010. On August 4, 2010, Walker announced his ruling in favor of the plaintiffs, overturning Proposition 8 based on the Due Process and Equal Protection Clauses of the Fourteenth Amendment to the U.S. Constitution. Walker concluded that California had no rational basis or vested interest in denying gays and lesbians marriage licenses:

An initiative measure adopted by the voters deserves great respect. The considered views and opinions of even the most highly qualified scholars and experts seldom outweigh the determinations of the voters. When challenged, however, the voters' determinations must find at least some support in evidence. This is especially so when those determinations enact into law classifications of persons. Conjecture, speculation and fears are not enough. Still less will the moral disapprobation of a group or class of citizens suffice, no matter how large the majority that shares that view. The evidence demonstrated beyond serious reckoning that Proposition 8 finds support only in such disapproval. As such, Proposition 8 is beyond the constitutional reach of the voters or their representatives.

Walker further noted that Proposition 8 was based on traditional notions of opposite-sex marriage and on moral disapproval of homosexuality, neither of which is a legal basis for discrimination. He noted that gays and lesbians are exactly the type of minority that strict scrutiny was designed to protect.

==== Findings of fact ====
Over 50 pages of the opinion were devoted to documenting Walkers' summary of 80 findings of fact, as well as related testimony and evidence, which had been heard during the hearing. Examples included:

- Marriage is a civil, not religious, matter.
- How the state defines civil marriage.
- Sexual orientation refers to an enduring pattern of sexual, affectional or romantic desires for and attractions to men, women or both sexes. An individual's sexual orientation can be expressed through self-identification, behavior or attraction.
- Individuals do not generally choose their sexual orientation. An individual does not, through conscious decision, therapeutic intervention or any other method, change sexual orientation.
- The state has no interest in asking gays and lesbians to change their orientation or in reducing the number of gays and lesbians in California.
- Marriage has benefits which the State and individuals gain from, which apply to same and opposite sex marriage alike.
- Same sex couples are identical to opposite sex couples in terms of characteristics relevant to successful marriage and union.
- Marrying a person of the opposite sex is an unrealistic option for gays and lesbians.
- Domestic partnerships lack the social meaning associated with marriage.
- Marriage of other groups, controversial on comparable grounds at the time, such as race or ethnicity, has not reduced the "vibrancy" or importance of marriage as a social institution, although many people raised concerns of its degradation at the time.
- The costs and harm (to the State and to lesbians and gays) resulting from denial of marriage to same-sex couples.
- A parent's gender is not a factor in a child's adjustment. An individual's sexual orientation does not determine whether that individual can be a good parent. Children raised by gay or lesbian parents are as likely as children raised by heterosexual parents to be healthy, successful and well-adjusted.
- Gay and lesbian adoption is widespread and is supported and encouraged in California law, providing evidence concerning same sex couples and parenting, with around 18% of same sex couples in California raising children. As a corollary, this provides evidence of fact that Proposition 8 is not rationally connected to improving parenting, since it makes no attempt to amend or revoke state approval of any aspect of parenting by non-married same sex couples.
- Gays and lesbians have a long history of being victims of discrimination.
- Religious beliefs that gay and lesbian relationships are sinful or inferior to heterosexual relationships harm gays and lesbians.

==== Substantive due process ====
Judge Walker characterized the right at issue as "the right to marry", which, he wrote, "has been historically and remains the right to choose a spouse and, with mutual consent, join together and form a household", citing Loving v. Virginia and Griswold v. Connecticut. He went on to say that "[r]ace and gender restrictions shaped marriage during eras of race and gender inequality, but such restrictions were never part of the historical core of the institution of marriage". Before analyzing Proposition 8 under the applicable level of review (strict scrutiny for fundamental rights), Walker noted that California's domestic partnership laws do not satisfy California's obligation to provide gays and lesbians the right to marry for two reasons: (1) domestic partnerships do not provide the same social meaning as marriage; and (2) domestic partnerships were created "specifically so that California could offer same-sex couples rights and benefits while explicitly withholding marriage from same-sex couples." Judge Walker then found Proposition 8 unconstitutional because it does not pass even a rational basis review (as he explains in the Equal Protection context), much less strict scrutiny.

==== Witness credibility ====
The expert witnesses presented by the plaintiffs were assessed as "amply qualified to offer opinion testimony on the subjects identified" and "offered credible opinion testimony on the subjects identified." The defense proffered only two witnesses as experts, both assessed as poor quality who "either couldn't or wouldn't respond" effectively to questions under cross-examination, despite the trial judge (in the analysis of watching legal analysts) "practically beg[ging] and cajol[ing] the Prop 8 lawyers to do better for their cause [and] to make more persuasive arguments": Walker determined that David Blankenhorn, who had been allowed to testify, lacked scholarly credentials and his testimony was speculative and did not carry credibility. ultimately judged as lacking "the qualifications to offer opinion testimony". The court found that Kenneth P. Miller's "opinions on gay and lesbian political power are entitled to little weight and only to the extent they are amply supported by reliable evidence." In 2012, Blankenhorn said he had changed his opinion and now accepted same-sex marriage.

=== Legal analysis of the decision ===
Professor Doug NeJaime of Loyola Law School noted that Judge Walker's decision was crafted similarly to the standard used by Justice Kennedy in his decision in Lawrence v. Texas, and suggested that Walker was "speaking" to Kennedy, who is commonly the swing vote on the Supreme Court. John C. Eastman, a law professor who supported Proposition 8, agreed with Professor NeJaime's assessment. Barry McDonald, a constitutional law professor at Pepperdine University, believed that Walker's strict handling of the case and meticulous evidence gathering would "make it more difficult for appellate courts to overturn this court's ruling."

"Only a trial court [like Walker's] can make factual findings," lawyer Brian DeVine said in an analysis. He further noted that "a Court of Appeal must give great deference to the factual findings of the trial court", and praised Walker "for carefully and diligently going through the facts of the case, creating a detailed and compelling record for the Court of Appeal and the Supreme Court". Andrew Cohen, CBS's legal analyst, questioned the defense team's decision to "cede so much ground at trial to their opponents" and called "inconceivable" their gamble that the conservative Supreme Court might "save the day". He praised Judge Walker's handling of the case, especially in respect to the defendant-intervenors. "During the trial, Walker practically begged and cajoled the Prop 8 lawyers to do better for their cause. He asked them written questions to draw them out. He scolded them during closing arguments to make more persuasive arguments. They simply didn't or couldn't or wouldn't respond." Lea Brilmayer, a Yale law professor, suggested that the perceived slant of the trial evidence and the decision resulted from "[Prop 8] supporters' sorry lawyering". Vikram Amar, a law professor from UC Davis argued that the defendant's decision to not put up a case may help them in the long run by arguing in higher courts that the evidence was irrelevant: Walker looked at whether a rational basis was supported by evidence, but might have considered instead whether a voter believing gay marriage might have a negative effect was entitled to be seen as holding their belief rationally, indifferent to any evidence.

The law firm Liberty Counsel, which has litigated opposition to same-sex marriage in California since 2004, criticized Alliance Defense Fund's handling of the case, stating that "ADF presented only two witnesses at trial, following the 15 witnesses presented by those who challenged Proposition 8. Even Judge Walker commented that he was concerned by the lack of evidence presented by ADF on behalf of Prop 8." Ed Whelan, president of the conservative Ethics and Public Policy Center and a former lawyer in the George W. Bush administration, criticized the ruling as being based on the judge's subjective and unsubstantiated views of current societal mores rather than on a neutral interpretation of the law. Whelan criticized in particular Judge Walker's repeated contention that certain facts about society were "beyond any doubt" or "beyond debate," such as Walker's contentions that same-sex parenting has been shown to be equally effective as opposite-sex parenting or that allowing same-sex couples to marry would not in any way negatively affect the rights of opponents of same-sex marriage. Whelan believes those points are in fact hotly contested.

=== Reaction to the judgment ===
Rallies in support of the decision were planned in major cities across the country. California's elected officials generally also responded positively to the ruling. Governor Schwarzenegger, who is named as a defendant in the case, said that "for the hundreds of thousands of Californians in gay and lesbian households who are managing their day-to-day lives, this decision affirms the full legal protections and safeguards I believe everyone deserves." He also complimented Walker's conduct during the trial, congratulating his efforts to "respect both sides of the issue equally". Attorney General Brown, also a defendant, lauded the decision, calling it "great news for California". The mayors of San Francisco, Los Angeles, and San Diego — Gavin Newsom, Antonio Villaraigosa, and Jerry Sanders, respectively — also praised the ruling. Both of California's United States Senators (Barbara Boxer and Dianne Feinstein) approved of the ruling as an advancement of equal rights.

Several Hollywood celebrities reacted positively to the decision. Ellen DeGeneres jubilantly tweeted "This just in: Equality won!" Paris Hilton also chimed in by tweeting, "What a huge historical day for equal rights in this country! They finally overturned Prop 8! There shouldn't be a law on true love. :)" Lady Gaga tweeted that the decision inspired her to write songs. Adam Lambert responded to the ruling by saying "I'm glad California has restored the right for all of its citizens to marry whomever they choose." The reaction on social networking sites like Twitter was overwhelmingly positive according to British news outlet The Independent, with the terms "overturned" and "prop. 8" becoming trending topics immediately following the decision.

The Church of Jesus Christ of Latter-day Saints commented that "this decision represents only the opening of a vigorous debate over the rights of the people to define and protect this most fundamental institution – marriage ..." The Roman Catholic bishops of California stated that "the courts do not have the right to distort the meaning of marriage." National Organization for Marriage (NOM) chairman Maggie Gallagher also disagreed with the ruling. She targeted the judge's sexuality and accused Walker of "substituting his views for those of the American people and of our Founding Fathers who I promise you would be shocked by courts that imagine they have the right to put gay marriage in our Constitution". Brian Brown, president of NOM, criticized the "biased way [Walker] conducted the trial". Some critics have characterized the ruling as judicial activism. The American Family Association called for Walker's impeachment.

== Appeals by proponents and intervenors ==
The state of California did not appeal the decision; however, the defendant-intervenors (including the official proponents of Proposition 8) challenged it. Subsequent to the appeal ruling, the Supreme Court eventually determined that in line with many other past cases, these parties lacked Article III standing under the U.S. Constitution's Case or Controversy clause, and therefore while the Courts of Appeal in fact ruled and had affirmed the District Court decision, their ruling was subsequently withdrawn and thus vacated in 2013 by direction of the Supreme Court, on the grounds that under federal law they erred and should have dismissed the appeal.

=== Court of Appeals ===
On August 4, 2010, the defendant-intervenors filed a notice of appeal to the Ninth Circuit. Imperial County, which was denied the right to intervene as a defendant, appealed that denial and Walker's decision. In January 2011, the Ninth Circuit dismissed the Imperial County appeal for lack of standing. Walker cast doubt on whether the defendant-intervenors had legal standing to appeal. If they lack standing, only the named defendants could appeal, and the principal named defendants, Governor Schwarzenegger and Attorney General Brown, refused to participate in the defense. A California Court of Appeals dismissed an emergency request by the Pacific Justice Institute, a conservative legal organization, to force Schwarzenegger and Brown to defend the case on appeal without a hearing, followed by the California Supreme Court on September 8, 2010, who denied without explanation.

On August 12, 2010, the defendant-intervenors filed an "emergency motion" in the Ninth Circuit for a stay of execution pending appeal. The stay motion was heard by a three-judge panel in the Ninth Circuit made up of Edward Leavy, Michael Daly Hawkins, and Sidney Thomas. On August 16, 2010, the Ninth Circuit unanimously granted the motion to stay, ordered expedited briefing on the merits of the appeal, and directed the parties to brief the issue of why the appeal should not be dismissed for lack of standing. On August 17, 2010, the same Ninth Circuit panel ordered expedited briefing on the Imperial County appeal. The court also ordered both appeals calendared for oral argument during the week of December 6, 2010, in San Francisco.

Part I of oral argument in the Court of Appeals (1:08:36)
Recording of the first hour of oral arguments that discussed the issue of standing.

The merits were heard by a different three-judge panel from the Ninth Circuit consisting of Stephen Reinhardt, Hawkins, and N. Randy Smith. Reinhardt, the most senior of the three judges, is considered a solid liberal. Hawkins is a Clinton appointee, and Smith was appointed by George W. Bush. Erwin Chemerinsky, who filed a brief in support of Walker's ruling, characterized the panel as "ideologically diverse". On December 1, 2010, Proposition 8 proponents filed a motion to disqualify Reinhardt from hearing the case because his wife, Ramona Ripston, is the executive director of the ACLU of Southern California and thus put his impartiality into question. Reinhardt denied the motion the next day. On December 6, 2010, the judges heard oral arguments, which were also televised and made available on C-SPAN.

Part II of oral argument in the Court of Appeals (1:23:38)
The second hour of oral arguments addressed the constitutionality of Proposition 8.

On January 4, 2011, in the appeal by the defendant-intervenors, the Ninth Circuit certified a question to the California Supreme Court. Because California officials had declined to defend the law, the federal court asked the state court to decide whether the backers of a challenged initiative had "a particularized interest in the initiative's validity or the authority to assert the State's interest in the initiative's validity" that would permit them to defend the law when state officials refuse to do so. The Ninth Circuit stayed the appeal pending a response from the California Supreme Court. The California Supreme Court heard oral argument on the certified question on September 6, 2011, and on November 17 ruled that the non-governmental proponents of Proposition 8 have the legal standing to defend it. Chief Justice Tani Cantil-Sakauye wrote in a unanimous opinion, "[I]n the past official proponents of initiative measures in California have uniformly been permitted to participate ... in numerous lawsuits in California courts challenging the validity of the initiative measure the proponents sponsored" and a concurring opinion was written by Justice Joyce L. Kennard.

==== Decision ====
On February 7, 2012, the three-judge panel ruled 2–1 in favor of the plaintiffs, declaring Proposition 8 unconstitutional. Reinhardt authored the majority opinion and Judge Smith filed a dissent on the constitutional issue while concurring that the defendant-intervenors had the standing to appeal and that Judge Walker's ruling should not be denied. In describing the issue before the court, Reinhardt said the usage of the word "marriage" was what was at stake, not any substantive legal rights: "Because under California statutory law, same-sex couples had all the rights of opposite-sex couples, regardless of their marital status, all parties agree that Proposition 8 had one effect only. It stripped same-sex couples of the ability they previously possessed to obtain from the State, or any other authorized party, an important right—the right to obtain and use the designation of 'marriage' to describe their relationships. Nothing more, nothing less."

The decision was made on narrow grounds, although Reinhardt wrote that "were we unable ... to resolve the matter on the basis we do, we would not hesitate to proceed to the broader question – the constitutionality of denying same-sex couples the right to marry", and that in their decision the only facts that mattered are in fact adjudicative facts capable of being proper findings, about the parties and their actions and motives, and facts conceded by the defendants, and therefore the standard of review became irrelevant in the appeal.

The majority opinion states that "Proposition 8 serves no purpose, and has no effect, other than to lessen the status and human dignity of gays and lesbians in California, and to officially reclassify their relationships and families as inferior to those of opposite-sex couples", and citing Romer v. Evans, that "The Constitution simply does not allow for 'laws of this sort'." It also states that the court did not need to consider Walker's reasons for holding Proposition 8 unconstitutional (that "it deprives same-sex couples of the fundamental right to marry" and violates the Equal Protection Clause by excluding same-sex couples from an "honored status" permitted different-sex couples) since the matter could be decided on narrower grounds: "Proposition 8 singles out same-sex couples for unequal treatment by taking away from them alone the right to marry", a "distinct constitutional violation" in that it subjected a minority group to "the deprivation of an existing right without a legitimate reason." The opinion call this "the narrowest ground" for considering the case. Reinhardt then asked if "the People of California have legitimate reasons for ... tak[ing] away from same-sex couples the right to have their lifelong partnerships dignified by the official status of 'marriage'." Finding a close parallel concerning the removal of an existing right from a minority group without legitimate reason in the case of Romer v. Evans 634-635 (1996), in that it was based on the narrowest ground upon which the matter could be decided, he rejected each of the reasons offered as justifications for Proposition 8. First, it had no effect on child-rearing since it made no change to laws governing parenting and adoption by either gender. Second, it would not affect the procreative behavior of opposite-sex couples. Similarly, it could not reflect a reasonable attempt to "proceed with caution" in altering social institutions because more than 18,000 same-sex couples had already married and because its intention was to create an absolute barrier embedded within the constitution (rather than a cautious restriction). Voters were told instead that the proposition would "eliminate" the right of same-sex couples to marry. The law had just one effect, namely to strip a disfavored minority of an "extraordinarily significan[t]" official designation - the name that society gives to the relationship that matters most between two adults.

Stating that in law, the willful creation of a new legal status quo and withdrawal of the right to a designation with significant social consequences is very different from a mere declining to extend that designation to a group in the first place, Reinhardt concluded that the "inevitable inference" was that Proposition 8's rationale was "disapproval of gays and lesbians as a class", and agreed with its unconstitutionality: "[T]he People of California may not, consistent with the Federal Constitution, add to their state constitution a provision that has no more practical effect than to strip gays and lesbians of their right to use the official designation that the State and society give to committed relationships, thereby adversely affecting the status and dignity of the members of a disfavored class."

Reinhardt's majority opinion is grounded in details specific to the case of California and supported by a narrow Constitutional principle. This narrowing was widely discussed and analyzed following the decision, with many legal commentators suggesting that the narrower decision made it more likely to either be upheld by, or denied certiorari by, the Supreme Court. William Eskridge, writing at the Stanford Law Review, described the courts as being "unable, and usually unwilling, to strongly challenge entrenched inequalities", and went on to suggest that while California may be ready to embrace same-sex marriage, the country is not, and as a result, the Supreme Court would be "wise to deny review ... or to go along with Judge Reinhardt's narrow ruling." Jane S. Schacter, writing at the Harvard Law Review, framed the opinion in terms of an incremental, federalist approach to securing LGBT rights. Schacter and many other commentators also suggested that Reinhardt's decision may be deliberately directed at Justice Anthony Kennedy, who is widely regarded as a swing vote in any Supreme Court decision on the case. On February 21, 2012, Proposition 8 supporters requested an en banc review by the Ninth Circuit. On June 5, 2012, the request was denied; at least four of the twenty-nine judges voted to rehear the case. The ruling was temporarily stayed to allow an appeal to the U.S. Supreme Court.

=== U.S. Supreme Court ===
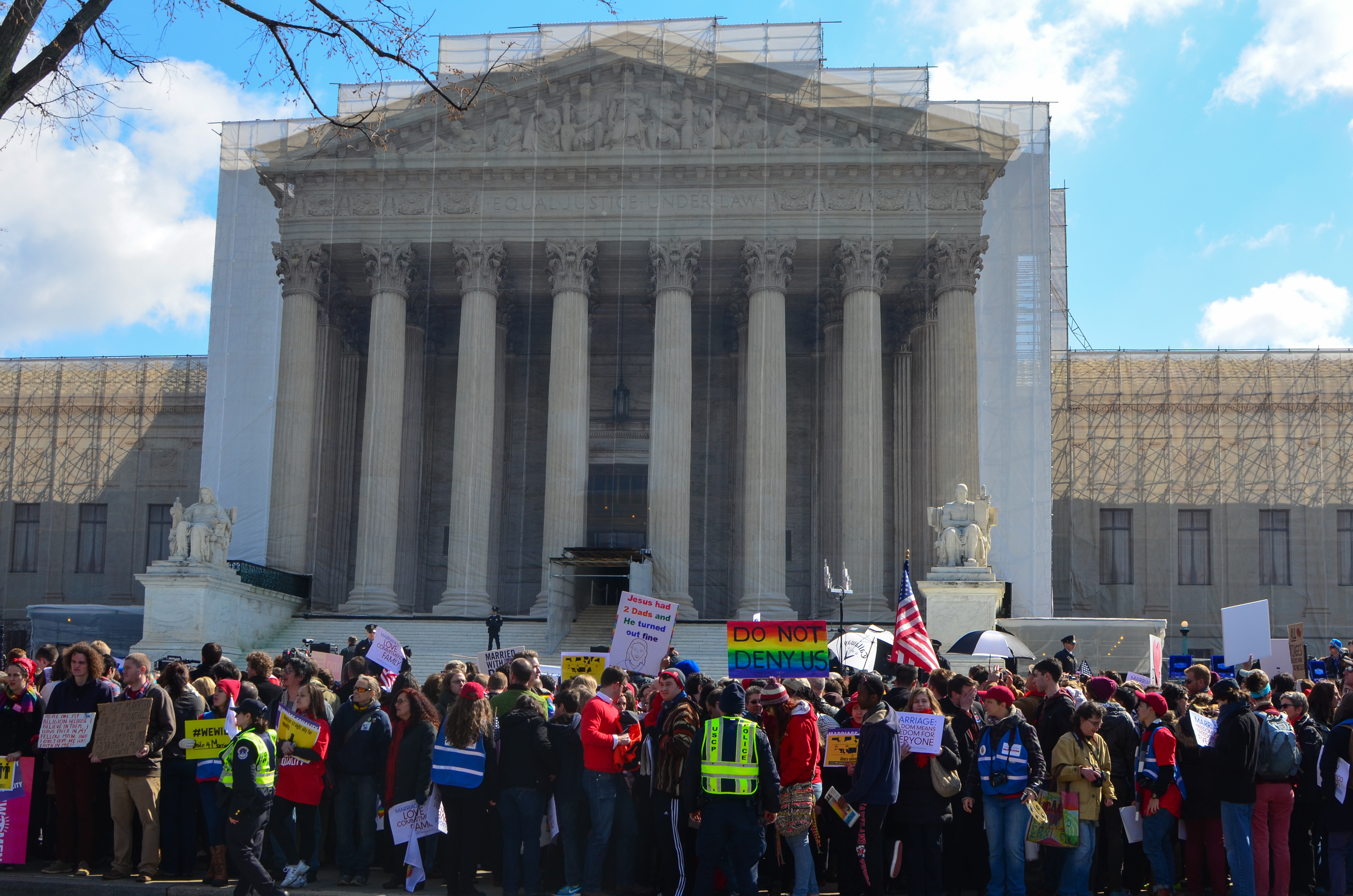
A demonstration in front of the Supreme Court on the day of oral arguments

Proponents of Proposition 8 appealed the case (captioned Hollingsworth v. Perry) to the U.S. Supreme Court on July 31, 2012. On August 24, opponents of Proposition 8 asked the Supreme Court not to hear the case. Olson said, "It was with strong mixed emotions ... But in the end, we represent real, live people, and if the court doesn't take the case, we've won and our clients and thousands of others in California can get married."

The Supreme Court granted certiorari in the case on December 7, 2012, ordering the parties to brief and argue the additional question of whether supporters of Prop. 8 have standing, i.e., a legal right to be involved in the case, under Article III, Section 2 of the U.S. Constitution. Olson and Boies stated that they would "address all the issues, focused on the fundamental constitutional right to marry of all citizens" before the Supreme Court, while defenders of Proposition 8 stated they would now have their first chance at a fair trial since they began defending Proposition 8. The Supreme Court heard oral arguments on March 26, 2013. For the United States, Donald B. Verrilli, Jr. was the amicus curiae supporting the respondents.

Oral arguments
Recording of oral arguments before the Supreme Court.

On June 26, 2013, in a 5–4 decision, the Supreme Court declined to revisit the Ninth Circuit's decision on the grounds that the backers of Proposition 8 had lacked standing to appeal, and that "Petitioners' arguments to the contrary are unpersuasive". For the same reasons, the Court ruled that the Proposition 8 proponents lacked standing at the Court of Appeals level. Therefore, the case was returned to the Ninth Circuit with instructions to vacate its former ruling (affirming the district court's overturning of Proposition 8). The majority opinion was authored by Chief Justice Roberts and was joined by Justices Scalia, Ginsburg, Breyer, and Kagan. Justices Kennedy, Thomas, Alito, and Sotomayor dissented. The Court's action left the original district court ruling (overturning Proposition 8) as the final ruling in the case. It also meant that the Supreme Court did not discuss the underlying merits of the case and the case did not result in a formal precedent for states other than California (although Obergefell v. Hodges would later result in a national precedent).

==== Details of the ruling ====
The Supreme Court decided the case on the basis of lack of standing (see also Case or Controversy Clause: Interpretation):

[A]ny person invoking the power of a federal court must demonstrate standing to do so. In other words, the litigant must seek a remedy for a personal and tangible harm. Although most standing cases consider whether a plaintiff has satisfied the requirement when filing suit, Article III demands that an "actual controversy" persist throughout all stages of litigation ... Standing "must be met by persons seeking appellate review, just as it must be met by persons appearing in courts of first instance."... The parties do not contest that respondents had standing to initiate this case against the California officials responsible for enforcing Proposition 8. But once the District Court issued its order, respondents no longer had any injury to redress, and the state officials chose not to appeal. The only individuals who sought to appeal were petitioners, who had intervened in the District Court, but they had not been ordered to do or refrain from doing anything. Their only interest was to vindicate the constitutional validity of a generally applicable California law. As this Court has repeatedly held, such a "generalized grievance"—no matter how sincere—is insufficient to confer standing.

The ruling also drew upon a "lengthy pedigree" of similar rulings on the same point of law, such as Lujan v. Defenders of Wildlife ("[A litigant] raising only a generally available grievance about government—claiming only harm to his and every citizen's interest in proper application of the Constitution and laws, and seeking relief that no more directly and tangibly benefits him than it does the public at large—does not state an Article III case or controversy"), Allen v. Wright ("an asserted right to have the Government act in accordance with law is not sufficient, standing alone, to confer jurisdiction on a federal court"), Diamond v. Charles (Article III standing "is not to be placed in the hands of 'concerned bystanders,' who will use it simply as a 'vehicle for the vindication of value interests'"), Arizonans for Official English ("Nor has this Court ever identified initiative proponents as Article-III-qualified defenders of the measures they advocated"), Karcher v. May ("Citizens who had standing in their 'public official' roles did not retain standing once they left public office"), and other cases unanimous on the point. The ruling summed up that Californian law provides a "right of proponents to defend their initiatives in California courts where Article III does not apply", but standing in federal court is based upon federal, not state, law; the same reasoning also invalidated the previous hearing by the Ninth Circuit. Eric Segall, a professor of law at Georgia State University, commented on the ruling:

[T]he interests of the people who proposed Proposition 8 are no different than the interests of any other citizen who believes that the constitutional amendment is valid. Allowing such a person (with no unique injury) to appeal an adverse federal court decision is roughly the same as saying any plaintiff can sue a state in federal court if he or she thinks a state law is invalid and is angry about it. And that is simply not allowed. So, the people who appealed the Proposition 8 case had no interest in the case beyond their [personal] wish to see the amendment upheld and thus did not suffer the requisite personal injury to satisfy the 'cases' or 'controversies' requirements of Article III.

==== Dissent ====
Justice Anthony Kennedy in his dissenting opinion, joined by Justices Alito, Thomas and Sotomayor, expressed concern about the implications of the Supreme Court ruling, noting that voter initiatives existed precisely for when voters felt the state was insufficiently responsive to their concerns or as a way for the people to assert their rights, and that elected officials should not have the ability to nullify such laws simply by choosing not to defend them. Kennedy wrote: "In the end, what the Court fails to grasp or accept is the basic premise of the initiative process. And it is this. The essence of democracy is that the right to make law rests in the people and flows to the government, not the other way around. Freedom resides first in the people without need of a grant from government." Constitutional law scholar and law school dean Erwin Chemerinsky suggested that, in the future, the state should be required to appoint a special attorney in the event that the state declines to undertake a defense, in order that a hearing on the law's constitutionality would not be dismissed before the merits had been considered.

== Aftermath ==
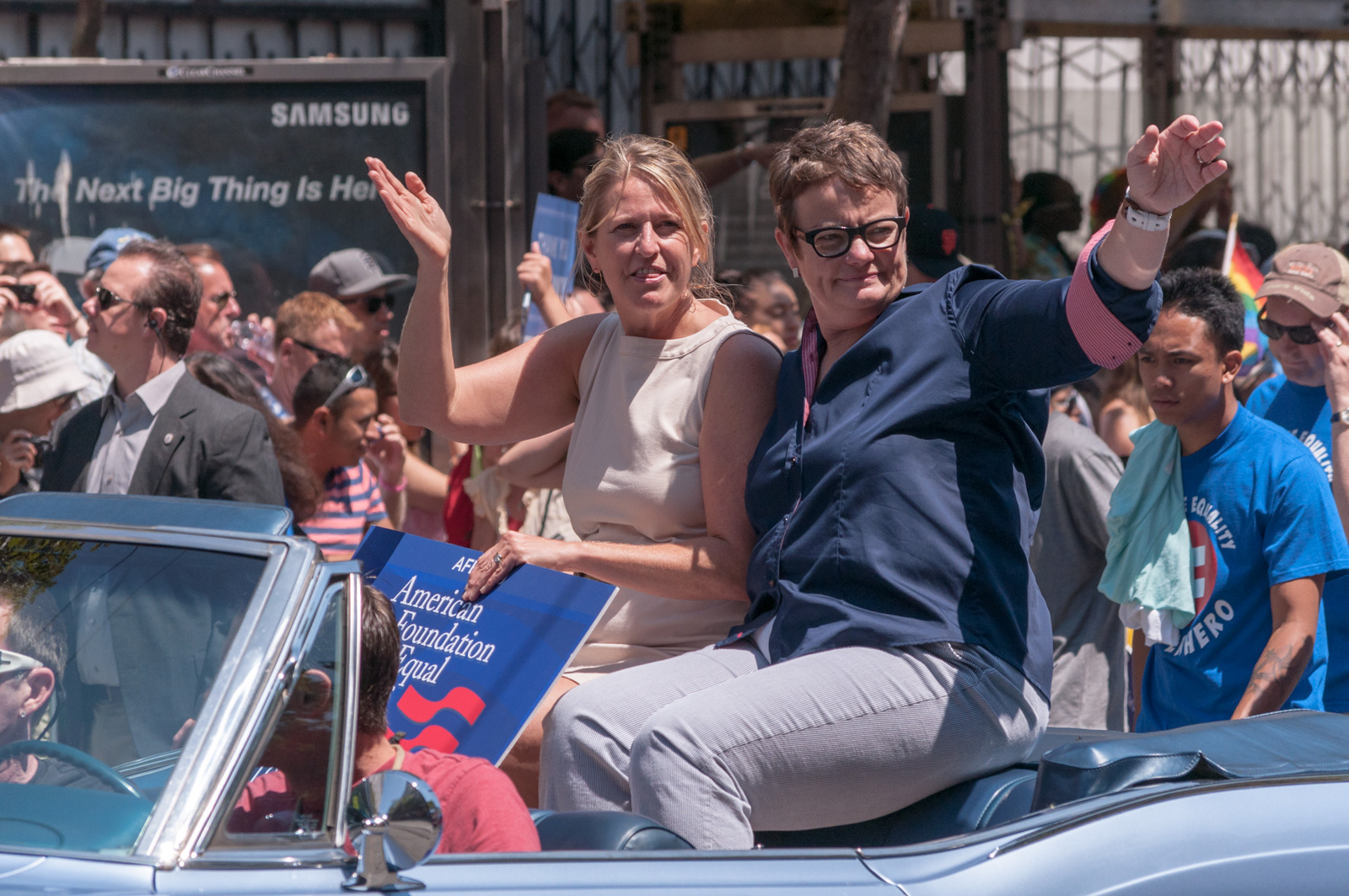
Plaintiffs Perry (left) and Stier at the 2013 San Francisco Pride Parade shortly after their marriage at San Francisco City Hall

Following the Supreme Court decision, on June 28, 2013, the same Ninth Circuit panel dissolved its stay of the district court's order, allowing same-sex marriages to proceed in California. The same day, Kristin Perry and Sandra Stier, plaintiffs in the case, married with California Attorney General Kamala Harris officiating at the ceremony. Two legal challenges to the implementation of the ruling followed, both dismissed by the courts:

- The day after the Ninth Circuit dissolved its stay, proponents of Proposition 8 filed an emergency application asking the Supreme Court to enforce the usual 25-day period in which the losing party may make a petition for rehearing; Circuit Justice Kennedy, overseeing the Ninth Circuit, denied the request on June 30, 2013.
- Proposition 8 supporters also sought a discretionary writ of mandate before the Supreme Court of California on July 12, 2013, to ask the court to stay, and then override, the statewide application of the court's ruling, contending it was not a class action and applied only to the counties and specific individuals named in the suit. Their argument was rejected by California's governor, who on legal advice "ordered" the change to license issue, California's Attorney General Kamala Harris, who noted that "state officials are obligated to govern marriage equally in all counties and that Walker's ruling specifically covers those officials", San Francisco's city attorney who stated that it was "the most basic concepts of American law ... that a state court will not overrule the federal judiciary", and by 24 defendant County Clerks who through their lawyer stated that their role was ultimately state supervised and it would be unfeasible to have a "patchwork" of different marriage criteria varying between the counties of a single state. On July 15, the court unanimously declined the request for immediate action and requested arguments from the parties, and on August 14, in a one-sentence order, unanimously refused to take up the petition.

This decision only made same-sex marriage legal in California. The decision would not apply in other states where it was still not allowed. In 2015, the United States Supreme Court decided Obergefell v. Hodges, 576 U.S. 644, which legalized same-sex marriages nationwide.

== Ethics concern ==
Recording of appeal to vacate Walker's decision.

Judge Walker retired in February 2011 and told reporters on April 6 that he is gay and has been in a relationship with a male doctor for about ten years. On April 25, supporters of Proposition 8 filed a motion in district court to vacate Walker's decision. They argued he should have recused himself or disclosed his relationship status, and unless he "disavowed any interest in marrying his partner", he had "a direct personal interest in the outcome of the case". District Court Chief Judge James Ware heard arguments on the motion on June 13 and denied it the next day. Ware wrote in the decision, "Requiring recusal because a court issued an injunction that could provide some speculative future benefit to the presiding judge solely on the basis of the fact that the judge belongs to the class against whom the unconstitutional law was directed would lead to a Section 455(b)(4) standard that required recusal of minority judges in most, if not all, civil rights cases. Congress could not have intended such an unworkable recusal statute." Supporters of Proposition 8 appealed this decision to the Ninth Circuit. On November 21, 2011, the court consolidated this appeal with the merits appeal. The appeals court in its February 7, 2012, decision found no evidence of bias on Walker's part and rejected arguments that he recuse himself.

Recording of appeal to keep videotapes sealed.

On September 19, 2011, Ware ordered the release of the trial videotapes to the public, which the defender-intervenors had sought to keep under seal. The Ninth Circuit stayed the release of the videos pending appeal, and heard oral arguments on the appeal on December 8, 2011. On February 2, 2012, the court decided that the videos should remain sealed. Writing for the panel, Reinhardt wrote: "The trial judge on several occasions unequivocally promised that the recording of the trial would be used only in chambers and not publicly broadcast. ... To revoke Chief Judge Walker's assurances after proponents had reasonably relied on them would cause serious damage to the integrity of the judicial process."

In April 2017, a local San Francisco Bay Area news broadcaster KQED filed a motion with the District Court to unseal the videotapes from the 2010 trial. The Court planned to maintain the seal until August 12, 2020. After various appeals filed by the proponents of Proposition 8 were resolved, the court released the videos on its YouTube page on October 12, 2022. On the 15th anniversary of the passage of Proposition 8, KQED invited the four persons who wished to marry to watch the videos and taped their reactions.

== See also ==
- 8 – a staged verbatim reenactment of the Perry v. Schwarzenegger district trial based on the transcripts and interviews
- In re Marriage Cases – 2008 California State Supreme Court case holding same-sex marriage to be a right under the state constitution
- List of LGBTQ-related cases in the United States Supreme Court
- List of United States Supreme Court cases, volume 570
- Obergefell v. Hodges
- Proposition 8 – state constitutional amendment banning same-sex marriage in California
- Same-sex marriage in California
- The Case Against 8 – a 2014 documentary film following the case from its initiation through to the final Supreme Court decision
- United States v. Windsor – a 2013 case, decided the same day as Hollingsworth v. Perry, that struck down Section 3 of the Defense of Marriage Act
