= Case or Controversy Clause =

Clause of the U.S. Constitution regarding judicial review

The Supreme Court of the United States has interpreted the Case or Controversy Clause of Article III of the United States Constitution (found in Art. III, Section 2, Clause 1) as embodying two distinct limitations on exercise of judicial review: a bar on the issuance of advisory opinions, and a requirement that parties must have standing.

In this context, "controversy" means an actual dispute between the parties.

== Summary ==
First, the Court has held that the clause identifies the scope of matters which a federal court can and cannot consider as a case (i.e., it distinguishes between lawsuits within and beyond the institutional competence of the federal judiciary), and limits federal judicial power only to such lawsuits as the court is competent to hear.

For example, the Court has determined that this clause prohibits the issuance of advisory opinions (in which no actual issue exists but an opinion is sought), and claims where the appellant stands to gain only in a generalized sense (i.e., no more or less than people at large), and allows only the adjudication of claims where (1) the plaintiff has actually and personally suffered injury or harm "in fact", (2) the injury or harm suffered by the plaintiff is fairly traceable to the defendant's actions, and (3) the injury or harm would be capable of redress by the court.

As with all parts of the law, there are exceptions. One of the most significant deals with free speech and free expression cases involving the First Amendment where a party suing over a restriction on freedom of speech issues can argue the unconstitutionality of a statute restricting certain types of speech or expression, even where the restriction might not directly affect them, such as a bookseller or video game dealer may argue that a restriction on some media restricts their customer's ability to choose various works and the restrictions could have a "chilling effect" on some publishers who might not release some works that would be affected by the law. Other than this, generally, there are usually no exceptions to the standing issue at the Federal level.

Secondly, the Court has interpreted the Clause as limiting Congress's ability to confer federal courts jurisdiction. It establishes an outer limit of the types of matters within which Congress may constitutionally confer jurisdiction. Historically, the Court has not interpreted this Clause to limit Congressional power to restrict the jurisdiction of the federal courts.

The delicate phrasing of the Clause and the ambiguity of the terms therein has inspired frequent academic debate. Though the Supreme Court has given much attention to the legal issues arising from this provision of the Constitution, many problematic issues remain unresolved. Many critics argue that the standing requirements imposed by the Case or Controversy Clause allow judges to push off difficult issues, ponder the merits of a case before parties had fair opportunity to litigate, and walk away from the responsibility of applying laws that judges may find distasteful.

== Text ==
Article III, Section 2, Clause 1 of the Constitution states:

The judicial Power shall extend to all Cases, in Law and Equity, arising under this Constitution, the Laws of the United States, and Treaties made, or which shall be made, under their Authority;—to all Cases affecting Ambassadors, other public ministers and Consuls;—to all Cases of admiralty and maritime Jurisdiction;—to Controversies to which the United States shall be a Party;—to Controversies between two or more States;—between a State and Citizens of another State;—between Citizens of different States;—between Citizens of the same State claiming Lands under Grants of different States, and between a State, or the Citizens thereof, and foreign States, Citizens or Subjects.

This clause, in addition to setting out the scope of the jurisdiction of the federal judiciary, prohibits courts from issuing advisory opinions, or from hearing cases that are either unripe, meaning that the controversy has not arisen yet, or moot, meaning that the controversy has already been resolved.

== History of legal application ==
The earliest expression by the United States Supreme Court of adherence to this requirement came during the presidency of George Washington. Washington sent a letter to the Court asking for their approval should he choose to seek advice from them from time to time on matters that might not come before the Court in a timely manner. Chief Justice John Jay wrote in his response that, although the members of the Court had great confidence in the ability of the president to receive appropriate advice from his executive officers, the Court itself was constitutionally bound not to go beyond its role as an arbiter of judicial questions.

The most famous case setting forth the parameters of this requirement is Muskrat v. United States, 219 U.S. 346 (1911), in which the Court held that when Congress paid the legal bills for both the plaintiffs and the defendant (in this case the U.S. Treasury department, by designation), then there was no real controversy between the parties, and a judgment of the Court would be the equivalent of an advisory opinion.

The boundaries of the "case and controversy" clause are open to dispute. For instance, the Court has held that where the controversy between parties has ceased because of a change in facts, it has no jurisdiction. However, where the case or controversy ceases—or, in legal terms, is "mooted"—after a case is filed, the Court may render a decision in the interest of justice. In Roe v. Wade, for instance, the Court applied the mootness exception for cases "capable of repetition, yet evading review." Justice Harry Blackmun wrote that due to the natural limitation of the human gestation period, issues concerning pregnancy will always come to term before the appellate process is complete. Roe v. Wade 410 U.S. 113 (1973). Therefore, the Supreme Court could rule on the constitutionality of an abortion law despite the issue being moot at the time of adjudication.

== Interpretation ==
The U.S. Supreme Court observed in DaimlerChrysler Corp. v. Cuno (2006): "No principle is more fundamental to the judiciary's proper role in our system of government than the constitutional limitation of federal-court jurisdiction to actual cases or controversies." The case-or-controversy requirement of Article III of the constitution requires plaintiffs to establish their standing to sue. Article III standing law is built on separation-of-powers principles. Its purpose is to prevent the judicial process from being used to usurp the powers of the legislative and executive branch of the U.S. federal government. Article III standing requires an injury that is "concrete, particularized and actual or imminent; fairly traceable to the challenged action and redressable by a favorable ruling."

Generally, the clause is taken to mean that a vague, broad injury is not grounds for a federal lawsuit. Relevant cases:

Lujan v. Defenders of Wildlife ("[A person] raising only a generally available grievance about government—claiming only harm to his and every citizen's interest in proper application of the Constitution and laws, and seeking relief that no more directly and tangibly benefits him than it does the public at large—does not state an Article III case or controversy."), Allen v. Wright ("an asserted right to have the Government act in accordance with law is not sufficient, standing alone, to confer jurisdiction on a federal court"), Diamond v. Charles (Article III standing "is not to be placed in the hands of 'concerned bystanders,' for use as a 'vehicle for the vindication of value interests.'"), Arizonans for Official English ("Nor has this Court ever identified initiative proponents as Article-III-qualified defenders of the measures they advocated."), Karcher v. May (Citizens who had standing in their 'public official' roles did not retain standing once they left public office), Hollingsworth v. Perry ("We have never before upheld the standing of a private party to defend the constitutionality of a state statute when state officials have chosen not to. We decline to do so for the first time here"), and numerous other cases.

The clause does not forbid individual States from granting standing to such parties; it only mandates that federal courts may not do so:

"The Court does not question [the State's] sovereign right to maintain an initiative process, or the right of initiative proponents to defend their initiatives in [State] courts. But standing in federal court is a question of federal law, not state law. No matter its reasons, the fact that a State thinks a private party should have standing to seek relief for a generalized grievance cannot override this Court's settled law to the contrary. Article III’s requirement that a party invoking the jurisdiction of a federal court seek relief for a personal, particularized injury serves vital interests going to the role of the Judiciary in the federal system of separated powers. States cannot alter that role simply by issuing to private parties who otherwise lack standing a ticket to the federal courthouse." (Hollingsworth v. Perry)
