= Metropolitan Life Insurance Co. v. Glenn =

- Supreme Court of the United States

Decided June 19, 2008
- Full case name: Metropolitan Life Insurance Co. v. Glenn
- Citations: 554 U.S. 105 (more)

Holding
- A company that both administers and funds a benefit plan operates under a conflict of interest that must be considered when a court reviews its claim denials.

Court membership
- Chief Justice John Roberts Associate Justices John P. Stevens · Antonin Scalia; Anthony Kennedy · David Souter; Clarence Thomas · Ruth Bader Ginsburg; Stephen Breyer · Samuel Alito

Case opinions
- Majority: Breyer, joined by Stevens, Souter, Ginsburg, Alito
- Concurrence: Roberts (in part)
- Concur/dissent: Kennedy
- Dissent: Scalia, joined by Thomas

Laws applied
- Employee Retirement Income Security Act of 1974

Metropolitan Life Insurance Co. v. Glenn, 554 U.S. 105 (2008), was a United States Supreme Court case in which the court held that a company that both administers and funds a benefit plan operates under a conflict of interest that must be considered when a court reviews its claim denials.

== Background ==
Metropolitan Life Insurance Company (MetLife) is an administrator and the insurer of Sears, Roebuck & Company's long-term disability insurance plan, which is governed by the Employee Retirement Income Security Act of 1974 (ERISA). The plan gives MetLife (as administrator) discretionary authority to determine the validity of an employee's benefits claim and provides that MetLife (as insurer) will pay the claims. Wanda Glenn, a Sears employee, was granted an initial 24 months of benefits under the plan following a diagnosis of a heart disorder. MetLife encouraged her to apply for, and she began receiving, Social Security disability benefits based on an agency determination that she could do no work. However, when MetLife itself had to determine whether she could work, in order to establish eligibility for extended plan benefits, it found her capable of doing sedentary work and denied her the benefits.

Glenn sought federal-court review under the Employee Retirement Income Security Act of 1974, but the federal District Court denied relief. In reversing, the Sixth Circuit Court of Appeals used a deferential standard of review and considered it a conflict of interest that MetLife both determined an employee's eligibility for benefits and paid the benefits out of its own pocket. Based on a combination of this conflict and other circumstances, it set aside MetLife's benefits denial.

== Opinion of the court ==
The Supreme Court issued an opinion on June 19, 2008.
