= Fifth Third Bancorp v. Dudenhoeffer =

- Supreme Court of the United States

Argued 2 April, 2014 Decided 25 June, 2014
- Full case name: Fifth Third Bancorp v. Dudenhoeffer
- Docket no.: 12-751
- Citations: 573 U.S. 409 (more) 134 S. Ct. 2459; 189 L. Ed. 2d 457

Holding
- There is no statutory basis for a 'presumption of prudence' test under ERISA. ESOP fiduciaries share the same duty of care as non-ESOP fiduciaries.

Court membership
- Chief Justice John Roberts Associate Justices Antonin Scalia · Anthony Kennedy; Clarence Thomas · Ruth Bader Ginsburg; Stephen Breyer · Samuel Alito; Sonia Sotomayor · Elena Kagan

Case opinion
- Majority: Breyer, joined by unanimous

Laws applied
- Employee Retirement Income Security Act of 1974

Fifth Third Bancorp v. Dudenhoeffer, 573 U.S. 409 (2014), was a United States Supreme Court case in which the court found Employee stockownership (ESOP) fiduciaries have the same prudential duties as non-ESOP fiduciaries, as set by ERISA, except that they are not required to diversify their investments beyond shares of the employer's stock.

== Background ==
Fifth Third Bancorp, a large financial services company, maintained a defined contribution retirement plan / 401(k) (specifically an Employee stock ownership (ESOP)) for its employees. In September 2009, a group of its former employees and current 401(k) participants file a class action lawsuit against Fifth Third and its corporate officers (in their capacity as administrators of the 401(k)), alleging that they violated their ERISA-mandated fiduciary duty under ERISA. Specifically, the employees alleged that Fifth Third and its officers should have known that Fifth Third's stock was overvalued.

Per the complaint, the stock was overvalued due to the firm's involvement in risky subprime lending and that officers had made material misstatements about the company's financial prospects to inflate the value of the company's stock. The employees alleged that a prudent fiduciary acting in good faith stewards of the ESOP's assets should have taken steps to address this overvaluation or protect the plan participants from the risks. Instead, they continued to buy and hold Fifth Third stock until the market crashed in July 2007, wiping out over 3/4ths of the company's stock value and leaving the plaintiffs destitute.

== In lower courts ==
The lawsuit, which was filed in the Southern District Court of Ohio, was originally dismissed by that court. The District Court ruled that the 401(k) plan administrators were entitled to a 'presumption of prudence' with respect to their decision to continue buying and holding their own company's stock. The Sixth Circuit reversed the District Court, ruling that additional evidence would be needed before a court could rule on whether the 'presumption of prudence' should apply. Fifth Third appealed the Sixth Circuit's decision to the Supreme Court of the United States in December 2012.

== Supreme Court opinion ==
The Supreme Court vacated the Sixth Circuit's ruling and remanded the case back to the lower courts for further reconsideration. Writing for a unanimous court, Justice Stephen Breyer determined that administrators of ESOPs are not entitled to a special 'presumption of prudence' with respect to their decision-making. Rather, they are held to the same legal standard of care as any other fiduciary under ERISA. The Supreme Court accepted the petitioners' argument that allowing lawsuits against ESOP fiduciaries may discourage employers from offering ESOP plans in the first place (thus contravening Congress's intent), but resolved the dilemma by creating guidelines for lower courts to apply in future cases at the motion to dismiss stage.
