= Chandler v. Miller =

- Supreme Court of the United States

Argued January 14, 1997 Decided April 15, 1997
- Full case name: Walker L. Chandler v. Zell D. Miller, Governor of Georgia
- Citations: 520 U.S. 305 (more) 117 S. Ct. 1295; 137 L. Ed. 2d 513; 1997 U.S. LEXIS 2505; 65 U.S.L.W. 4243; 145 A.L.R. Fed. 657; 12 I.E.R. Cas. (BNA) 1233; 97 Cal. Daily Op. Service 2723; 97 Daily Journal DAR 4831; 10 Fla. L. Weekly Fed. S 393

Case history
- Prior: 73 F.3d 1543 (11th Cir. 1996) (reversed)

Holding
- The statute requiring drug testing for all candidates for state offices violated the Fourth Amendment.

Court membership
- Chief Justice William Rehnquist Associate Justices John P. Stevens · Sandra Day O'Connor; Antonin Scalia · Anthony Kennedy; David Souter · Clarence Thomas; Ruth Bader Ginsburg · Stephen Breyer

Case opinions
- Majority: Ginsburg, joined by Stevens, O'Connor, Scalia, Kennedy, Souter, Thomas, Breyer
- Dissent: Rehnquist

Laws applied
- U.S. Const. amend. IV

Chandler v. Miller, 520 U.S. 305 (1997), was a case before the United States Supreme Court concerning the Constitutionality under the Fourth Amendment of a state statute requiring drug tests of all candidates for certain state offices. The case is notable as being the only one in recent years where the Supreme Court has upheld a challenge to a ballot access restriction from members of a third party, in this case the Libertarian Party of Georgia.

== Background ==
=== Statute ===
In 1990, Georgia enacted a statute which required candidates for designated state office to certify that they had taken a drug test and obtained negative results. The candidate could provide test specimen at a laboratory approved by the state or at the office of the candidate's personal physician. Once a urine sample was obtained, a state-approved laboratory determined whether any of the specified illegal drugs were present and prepared a certificate reporting the test results to the candidate.

=== Facts ===
In 1994, three Libertarian Party candidates for such state offices statute filed an action in District Court against the governor of Georgia and two other state officials involved in the administration of the statute, requesting declaratory and injunctive relief barring enforcement of the statute. They alleged that the drug tests required by the statute violated their rights under provisions including the Federal Constitution's Fourth Amendment.

=== District court ===
The District Court denied the candidates' motion for a preliminary injunction. After the candidates submitted to the drug tests, obtained the required certificates, and appeared on the ballot in the 1994 election, the District Court entered final judgment for the state officials.

=== Eleventh Circuit ===
On appeal, the United States Court of Appeals for the Eleventh Circuit, in affirming, expressed the view that with respect to the Fourth Amendment, the state's interests outweighed the privacy intrusion caused by the statute's required certification (73 F.3d 1543).

== Opinion of the Court ==
On certiorari, Ginsburg, joined by Stevens, O'Connor, Scalia, Kennedy, Souter, Thomas, and Breyer reversed. The Court noted that while the Fourth Amendment generally prohibits officials from conducting search and seizures without individualized suspicion, there does exist a "closely guarded" category of permissible suspicionless searches and seizures. However, the Court held that the statute's drug-testing requirement did not fit within this category. The Court emphasized that the proffered special need for drug testing must be substantial—important enough to override the individual's acknowledged privacy interest, sufficiently vital to suppress the Fourth Amendment's normal requirement of individualized suspicion.

Additionally, the Court found that Georgia failed to show, in justification of Ga. Code Ann. § 21-2-140, a special need of that kind. Notably lacking in respondent officials' presentation was any indication of a concrete danger that demanded departure from the Fourth Amendment's main rule. The statute was not needed and could not work to ferret out lawbreakers, and officials barely attempted to support the statute on that ground. However well meant, the candidate drug test Georgia devised diminished personal privacy for a symbol's sake; state action that is prohibited by the Fourth Amendment. In addition to Georgia's failure to provide evidence of a drug problem among its state officials, the Court concluded that even if such a problem did exist, the affected officials would likely not perform the kind of high-risk, safety-sensitive tasks which might justify the statute's proposed incursion on their individual privacy rights. Where, as in this case, public safety was not genuinely jeopardized, the Fourth Amendment precluded a suspicionless search, no matter how conveniently arranged.

=== Dissent ===
Chief Justice Rehnquist expressed the view that the statute's urinalysis test was a reasonable search under the Fourth Amendment.

== See also ==
- List of United States Supreme Court cases, volume 520
- List of United States Supreme Court cases
- Lists of United States Supreme Court cases by volume
