= Anti-alienation clause =

An Anti-alienation clause is a provision in the governing document for an arrangement, such as a trust, that specifies that the beneficial or equitable owner of the property held in that arrangement cannot transfer the interest to a third party. This rule is an exception to the general rule in property law that favors free alienability.

The exception is recognized to benefit minors, incompetents, and trust beneficiaries that may otherwise behave as a spendthrift would.

A spendthrift trust is an example of an arrangement containing an anti-alienation provision. The governing document of such a trust provides that the trust corpus may not be reached by creditors while the property is held in the trust.

Creditors aware of this legal restriction on alienation may choose not to lend to the spendthrift.

== Applied to pensions ==
The Employee Retirement Income Security Act (ERISA) and the Internal Revenue Code provide that most retirement plans contain anti-alienation provisions related to the benefits held by these trusts. The anti-alienation provisions require these trusts to prohibit the alienation or assignment of pension benefits to anyone other than the affected participant in the plan, or his/her designated beneficiaries. The anti-alienation section of ERISA was enacted in 1974 to prevent workers from giving away improvidently their pension benefits to creditors. The most important exception is in divorce and child support cases, where state courts have held that “qualified domestic relations orders (QDROs)” can alienate pensions.
