= Young v. Harper =

- Supreme Court of the United States

Decided March 18, 1997
- Full case name: Young v. Harper
- Citations: 520 U.S. 143 (more)

Holding
- People who have been released from incarceration in programs that are equivalent to parole have the same rights as people on parole; they are entitled to a hearing before the government can return them to incarceration.

Court membership
- Chief Justice William Rehnquist Associate Justices John P. Stevens · Sandra Day O'Connor; Antonin Scalia · Anthony Kennedy; David Souter · Clarence Thomas; Ruth Bader Ginsburg · Stephen Breyer

Case opinion
- Majority: Thomas, joined by unanimous

Young v. Harper, 520 U.S. 143 (1997), was a United States Supreme Court case in which the Court held that people who have been released from incarceration in programs that are equivalent to parole have the same rights as people on parole; they are entitled to a hearing before the government can return them to incarceration.
