= Boggs v. Boggs =

- Supreme Court of the United States

Argued January 15, 1997 Decided June 2, 1997
- Full case name: Sandra Jean Dale Boggs v. Thomas F. Boggs, Harry M. Boggs, and David B. Boggs
- Citations: 520 U.S. 833 (more) 117 S.Ct. 1754; 138 L. Ed. 2d 45; 1997 U.S. LEXIS 3396

Case history
- Prior: District court granted summary judgment to respondent sons, 849 F. Supp. 462 (E.D. La. 1994); Court of appeals affirmed, 82 F.3d 90 (5th Cir. 1996).

Holding
- ERISA pre-empts state community property law, when dealing with non-participating spouse and the right to will undistributed pensions.

Court membership
- Chief Justice William Rehnquist Associate Justices John P. Stevens · Sandra Day O'Connor; Antonin Scalia · Anthony Kennedy; David Souter · Clarence Thomas; Ruth Bader Ginsburg · Stephen Breyer

Case opinions
- Majority: Kennedy, joined by Stevens, Scalia, Souter, Thomas; Rehnquist, Ginsburg (part III)
- Dissent: Breyer, joined by O'Connor; Rehnquist, Ginsburg (except part II-B-3)

Laws applied
- Employee Retirement Income Security Act of 1974, 29 U.S.C. § 1001 et seq.

Boggs v. Boggs, 520 U.S. 833 (1997), was a United States Supreme Court case in which the Court held that a spouse that is not a participant in an ERISA account cannot will part or all of it before distribution of the pension plan.

== Background ==
Isaac Boggs worked for South Central Bell for 36 years. He was married to Dorothy Boggs until she died in 1979. Dorothy and Isaac had three sons together. A year after Dorothy's death, Isaac remarried to Sandra, and they stayed married until Isaac's death in 1989.

When Isaac retired in 1985 from South Central Bell he was given several benefits from his employer. Among the benefits were a lump-sum distribution from the Bell System Savings Plan for Salaried employees (in the amount of $151,628.94); the amount was rolled over in to an Individual Retirement Account which was untouched during Isaac's lifetime, and at Issac's death was worth $180,778.05. Isaac also was given at retirement 96 shares of AT&T stock.

In her will Dorothy left her sons an usufruct (which is similar to a common-law life estate; the Boggs lived in Louisiana which recognizes the concept) to 2/3 of Isaac's life-estate. However Dorothy's will was based on Isaac's will; after Dorothy's death Isaac changed his will, giving everything to Sandra.

Two of his sons filed a complaint in United States District Court to seek a declaratory judgment.
