= Mazurek v. Armstrong =

- Supreme Court of the United States

Decided June 16, 1997
- Full case name: Joseph P. Mazurek, Attorney General of Montana v. James H. Armstrong, et al.
- Citations: 520 U.S. 968 (more)

Case history
- Prior: Preliminary injunction denied in relevant part sub nom. Armstrong v. Mazurek, 906 F. Supp. 561 (D. Mont. 1995); vacated and remanded, 94 F.3d 566 (9th Cir. 1996)

Holding
- A Montana law that allows only physicians to perform abortions is constitutional because there is no evidence that it was intended to burden a woman's right to choose.

Court membership
- Chief Justice William Rehnquist Associate Justices John P. Stevens · Sandra Day O'Connor; Antonin Scalia · Anthony Kennedy; David Souter · Clarence Thomas; Ruth Bader Ginsburg · Stephen Breyer

Case opinions
- Per curiam
- Dissent: Stevens, joined by Ginsburg, Breyer

Laws applied
- U.S. Const. Amend. XIV

Mazurek v. Armstrong, 520 U.S. 968 (1997), was a United States Supreme Court case in which the Court upheld a Montana law permitting only licensed physicians to perform abortions. The Court summarily reversed a ruling of the United States Court of Appeals for the Ninth Circuit that had held that the law was likely intended to inhibit abortion access. In a per curiam opinion, a majority of the Court found that there was no evidence that the Montana legislature acted with an invalid intent. The Court also reiterated its earlier holding in Planned Parenthood v. Casey that the states have broad flexibility to regulate abortion so long as their regulations do not create an undue burden on a woman's right to choose. Three dissenting justices, in an opinion by Justice John Paul Stevens, wrote that they would have declined to hear the case because proceedings were still pending in the lower courts. The law itself was later struck down by the Montana Supreme Court on state-constitutional grounds.

== Background ==
=== Legal background ===
In its landmark 1973 decision in Roe v. Wade, the Supreme Court ruled that the U.S. Constitution protected the right to an abortion. The 1992 case of Planned Parenthood v. Casey provided the test for determining whether an abortion law was constitutional. Adopting an undue burden standard, the Casey Court held that an abortion regulation was unconstitutional if it had "the purpose or effect of placing a substantial obstacle in the path of a woman seeking an abortion of a nonviable fetus." The justices did not elaborate on the "purpose" prong of this test, and the manner of its application remained an open question.

=== Case background ===
==== Prior developments ====
The 1974 Montana Abortion Control Act required that abortions be performed only by licensed physicians. However, that portion of the law was not enforced, and the Montana Board of Medical Examiners issued regulations permitting physician assistants to perform abortions. The only physician assistant in Montana to perform abortions was Susan Cahill, who had operated under Dr. James Armstrong's supervision since 1977. In 1992, the leaders of various anti-abortion groups argued to local officials that Cahill and Armstrong should be prosecuted for violating the 1974 law. The Kalispell police commenced an investigation, but Cahill and Armstrong, among others, filed a lawsuit seeking to invalidate the law. The court, upon stipulation of the parties, enjoined Montana from prosecuting Armstrong and Cahill since Cahill was considered a licensed physician under the Board of Medical Examiners' regulations. The Montana legislature, however, responded, passing House Bill 442, which specifically forbade physician assistants from performing abortions. The bill, which was drafted by an anti-abortion group, was signed into law by Montana governor Marc Racicot. Abortion-rights advocates claimed the law was an unconstitutional attempt to target Cahill, while Racicot argued that it aimed to protect women's health. Such physician-only laws were on the books in forty other states.

==== Lower-court proceedings ====
Before the law could take effect, six licensed physicians and Cahill, represented by the Center for Reproductive Law and Policy, filed suit in the U.S. District Court for the District of Montana against Montana Attorney General Joseph P. Mazurek. They moved for a preliminary injunction, arguing that the law violated the U.S. Constitution because it was intended to create an undue burden on abortion rights. They also argued that the law violated equal protection and that it was a bill of attainder intended to target Cahill. On September 29, 1995, Judge Paul G. Hatfield denied the motion for a preliminary injunction, finding that the law was likely constitutional and that the balance of hardships did not weigh sufficiently in the plaintiffs' favor.

The plaintiffs appealed to the Ninth Circuit. Oral argument was heard on February 28, 1996, before Circuit Judges Harry Pregerson, William C. Canby Jr., and Michael Daly Hawkins. On August 27, 1996, the panel issued a unanimous per curiam opinion. The appeals court argued that the district court did not appropriately examine whether the Montana legislature had an illicit motive, writing that such an examination required assessing the "totality of the circumstances surrounding the enactment of [the law]" as well as whether the law "can be regarded as serving a legitimate health function." Based on those factors, the court held that the plaintiffs had a "fair chance of success" on the merits of their case. The panel vacated the district court's judgment and remanded the case, directing the district court to reassess the balance of the equities. The full Ninth Circuit declined to reconsider the case en banc, and the district court entered a temporary injunction against the law pending potential Supreme Court review. The defendants filed a petition for a writ of certiorari on January 13, 1997, asking the Supreme Court to hear the case and to reverse the Ninth Circuit's ruling. The plaintiffs filed a brief in opposition on March 28, 1997, and the justices considered the petition at six consecutive private conferences between April and June of that year.

== Supreme Court decision ==
=== Majority opinion ===
The Supreme Court ruled on June 16, 1997, issuing an unsigned per curiam opinion nine pages in length. The Court granted the petition for certiorari and, without hearing oral argument, reversed the Ninth Circuit's judgment. The majority found it significant that the Ninth Circuit had not ruled that the law would actually burden abortion access. Writing that "we do not assume unconstitutional legislative intent...when the results are harmless," the Court argued that the Ninth Circuit had erred by imputing bad faith to the legislature. The majority also found no evidence of bad faith in the record, writing that "[o]ne searches the Court of Appeals' opinion in vain for any mention of any evidence suggesting an unlawful motive on the part of the Montana Legislature." According to the majority, the fact that the law was drafted by a group opposed to abortion "says nothing significant about the legislature's purpose in passing it." In addition, the Court declined to infer illegal intent based on the law's alleged lack of health benefits. Quoting Casey, the majority said that "the Constitution gives the States broad latitude to decide that particular functions may be performed only by licensed professionals, even if an objective assessment might suggest that those same tasks could be performed by others". Finally, the Court rejected the argument that the law was intended to target physician assistant Susan Cahill, arguing that "the fact that only a single practitioner" was affected by the law bolstered the claim for its constitutionality. The majority thus determined the Ninth Circuit's ruling to be "clearly erroneous under our precedents".

The Court closed by answering procedural arguments against its intervention. The plaintiffs had claimed that the Court should decline to hear the case because it was an interlocutory appeal, not an appeal from a final judgment. While the majority conceded that the Supreme Court is "ordinarily reluctant to exercise our certiorari jurisdiction" in such a situation, the Court argued that such an action was justified both because of the perceived clear error in the Ninth Circuit's ruling and because of the "immediate consequences" facing Montana and other states with physicians-only laws. Finding the proper outcome obvious, the Court found no need for oral argument and instead ended its opinion by granting the petition for certiorari, reversing the Ninth Circuit's judgment, and remanding for further proceedings.

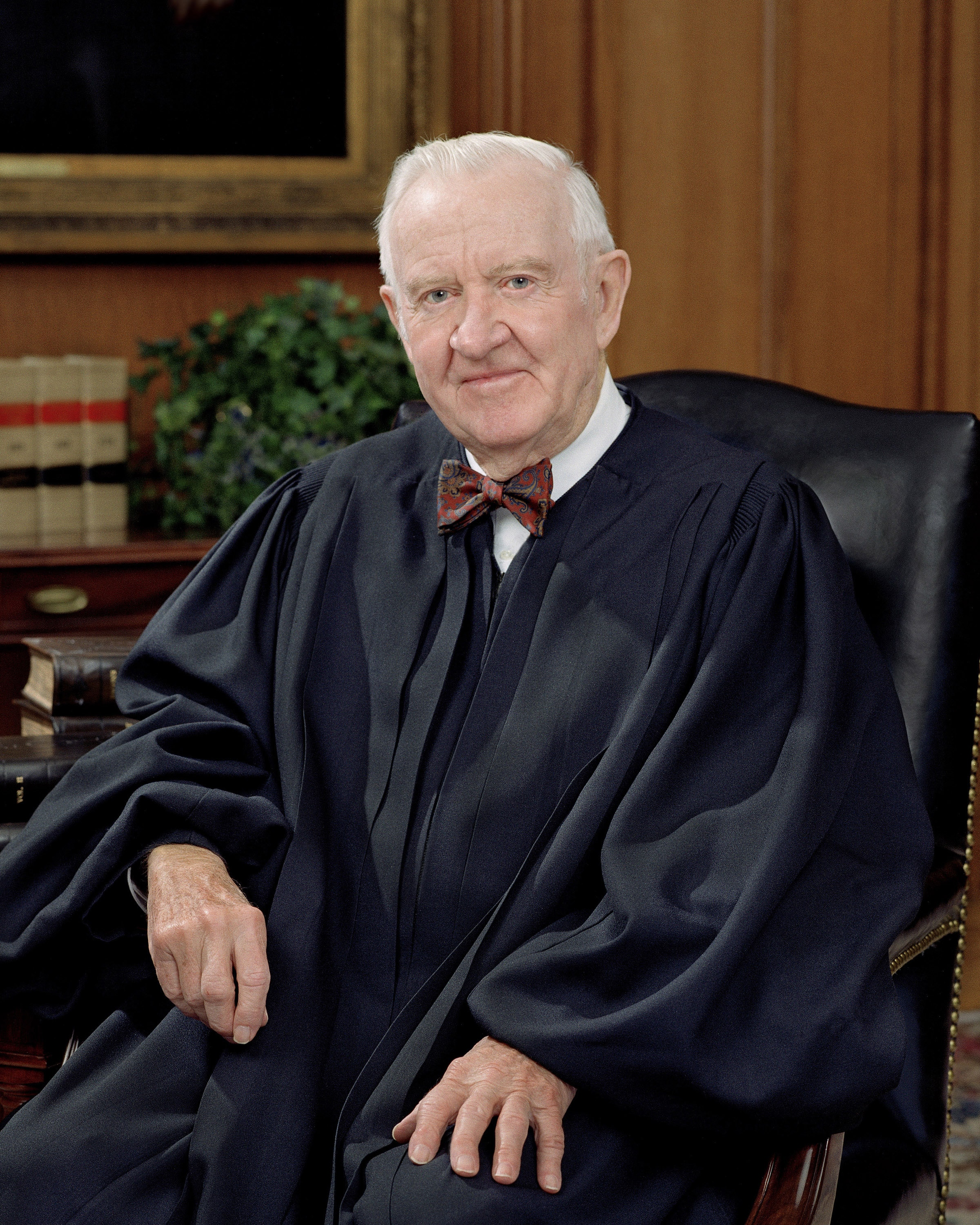
Justice John Paul Stevens wrote the dissent in Mazurek.

=== Dissenting opinion ===
Justice John Paul Stevens dissented, writing a five-page opinion joined by Justices Ruth Bader Ginsburg and Stephen G. Breyer. He began by conceding that "the Court may ultimately prove to be correct in its conclusion" that the Ninth Circuit erred. However, Stevens wrote, he did not think the Ninth Circuit's decision had "sufficient importance to justify review of the merits at this preliminary stage of the proceeding." Stevens then proceeded to the merits, writing that "the record strongly indicates that the physician assistant provision was aimed at excluding one specific person – respondent Cahill – from the category of persons who could perform abortions." He reached this conclusion primarily because Cahill was the only person against whom the law operated. Stevens further claimed that the majority ignored the 1995 case of Miller v. Johnson and the 1996 case of Shaw v. Hunt, both of which dealt with legislative intent. The dissenters also maintained that the majority erred by intervening before the case had been permanently resolved. Finally, Stevens argued that the case involved an "extremely narrow issue" pertinent only to Montana and unworthy of the Court's review. Stevens would simply have denied the petition for a writ of certiorari.

== Subsequent developments ==
Public reaction to the Court's decision was mixed. The president of the pro-life group Americans United for Life praised the ruling as "a significant public health victory," while the head of the pro-choice Center for Reproductive Law and Policy denounced it as "a devastating acceptance of discrimination against abortion providers."

In fall 1997, the same plaintiffs filed suit in Montana state court, seeking an injunction against the physicians-only law on the basis that it violated the Montana Constitution's guarantees of privacy, due process, and equal protection. Helena district judge Jeffrey Sherlock granted an injunction, and the Montana Supreme Court unanimously affirmed on October 26, 1999. In a sweeping opinion by Justice James C. Nelson, the court ruled that "where the right of individual privacy is implicated, Montana's Constitution affords significantly broader protection than does the federal constitution." It therefore struck down the law, which still remains on the books but is unenforceable.

== Impact ==
Mazurek has received attention from scholars and the courts because it is one of the few cases applying the Casey undue burden standard, particularly the purpose prong of that standard. One scholar has written that, due to Mazurek, "proving [illicit legislative] intent to the Court's satisfaction has proven virtually impossible in practice." The lower federal courts have therefore largely ignored Casey's purpose prong in their abortion cases, focusing instead on the effects prong. Another analyst has argued that "the decision in Mazurek continues the gradual deterioration of the holding in Roe v. Wade, as the Supreme Court demonstrates disfavor toward the right to obtain an abortion." The Court's decision has been understood to permit regulations that require mifepristone pills, used to facilitate medication abortions, to be dispensed in person by doctors. Some judges and scholars maintain, based on Mazurek, that courts may not consider whether an abortion regulation lacks health benefits. Mazurek has also been cited in other key Supreme Court abortion cases, such as Stenberg v. Carhart, Gonzales v. Carhart, Whole Woman's Health v. Hellerstedt, and June Medical Services, LLC v. Russo.
