= Cunningham v. Cornell University =

2025 US Supreme Court case

- Supreme Court of the United States

Argued January 22, 2025 Decided April 17, 2025
- Full case name: Casey Cunningham, et al. v. Cornell University, et al.
- Docket no.: 23-1007
- Citations: 604 U.S. 693 (more)
- Argument: Oral argument
- Decision: Opinion

Court membership
- Chief Justice John Roberts Associate Justices Clarence Thomas · Samuel Alito; Sonia Sotomayor · Elena Kagan; Neil Gorsuch · Brett Kavanaugh; Amy Coney Barrett · Ketanji Brown Jackson

Case opinions
- Majority: Sotomayor, joined by unanimous
- Concurrence: Alito, joined by Thomas and Kavanaugh

Laws applied
- Employee Retirement Income Security Act of 1974 (29 U.S.C. §§ 1106–1108)

Cunningham v. Cornell University, 604 U.S. 693, is a United States Supreme Court case holding that conflict of interest claims under the Employee Retirement Income Security Act of 1974 do not need to address exceptions in the initial pleading.

== Background ==
The Employee Retirement Income Security Act of 1974 (ERISA) prohibits plan fiduciaries from engaging in transactions that present a conflict of interest, but another section exempts deals made at fair market value for "services necessary for the establishment or operation of the plan." When a group of Cornell University employees sued over the university paying TIAA and Fidelity Investments to handle both investment planning and record-keeping, the US District Court for the Southern District of New York dismissed their claims. On appeal, the US Court of Appeals for the Second Circuit affirmed the dismissal, holding that the pleading must explain why the exception is inapplicable.

== Supreme Court ==
In a unanimous decision written by Associate Justice Sonia Sotomayor, the Supreme Court rejected the Second Circuit's reliance on United States v. Cook (1874) as an exception to the holding in Meacham v. Knolls Atomic Power Laboratory (2008). Meacham held that exceptions separated from their associated prohibitions are generally affirmative defenses, rather than pleading requirements. As the Waite Court clarified in United States v. Reese (1876), Cook only applies to criminal pleadings to ensure fair notice.

=== Concurrence ===
Associate Justice Samuel Alito wrote a concurring opinion advising district courts to use Rule 7(a) of the Federal Rules of Civil Procedure to require that plaintiffs file a reply when a defendant's answer to the pleading raises an affirmative defense.
