= Pegram v. Herdrich =

- Supreme Court of the United States

Argued February 23, 2000 Decided June 12, 2000
- Full case name: Lori Pegram, et al., Petitioners v. Cynthia Herdrich
- Citations: 530 U.S. 211 (more) 120 S. Ct. 2143; 147 L. Ed. 2d 164; 2000 U.S. LEXIS 3964

Holding
- Because mixed treatment and eligibility decisions by health maintenance organization physicians are not fiduciary according to the Employee Retirement Income Security Act, Herdrich does not state a claim under the Act.

Court membership
- Chief Justice William Rehnquist Associate Justices John P. Stevens · Sandra Day O'Connor; Antonin Scalia · Anthony Kennedy; David Souter · Clarence Thomas; Ruth Bader Ginsburg · Stephen Breyer

Case opinion
- Majority: Souter, joined by unanimous

Laws applied
- Employee Retirement Income Security Act of 1974

Pegram v. Herdrich, 530 U.S. 211 (2000), was a United States Supreme Court case that held that the Employee Retirement Income Security Act of 1974 does not provide a remedy for coverage determinations by health maintenance organizations. The case is important because by excluding suits involving coverage determinations from the Act, it does not pre-empt state law remedies.
