= Adams v. Robertson =

- Supreme Court of the United States

Argued January 14, 1997 Decided March 3, 1997
- Full case name: Guy E. Adams, et al., Petitioners v. Charlie Frank Robertson and Liberty National Life Insurance Company
- Citations: 520 U.S. 83 (more) 117 S. Ct. 1028; 137 L. Ed. 2d 203; 1997 U.S. LEXIS 1490; 65 U.S.L.W. 4180; 97 Cal. Daily Op. Service 1538; 97 Daily Journal DAR 2270; 10 Fla. L. Weekly Fed. S 339

Case history
- Prior: On writ of certiorari to the Supreme Court of Alabama, reported at: 1995 Ala. LEXIS 689. Adams v. Robertson, 676 So. 2d 1265, 1995 Ala. LEXIS 689 (Ala., 1995)

Court membership
- Chief Justice William Rehnquist Associate Justices John P. Stevens · Sandra Day O'Connor; Antonin Scalia · Anthony Kennedy; David Souter · Clarence Thomas; Ruth Bader Ginsburg · Stephen Breyer

Case opinion
- Per curiam

Adams v. Robertson, 520 U.S. 83 (1997), was a United States Supreme Court case in which the court, in a per curiam opinion, "dismissed the writ of certiorari as improvidently granted."

== Background ==
The defendant, Charlie Frank Robertson, filed a class action lawsuit in 1992, alleging that "Liberty National Life Insurance Company had fraudulently encouraged its customers to exchange existing health insurance policies for new policies" that provided an insubstantial amount of coverage for cancer treatment. At trial, a settlement was agreed upon that precluded class members from individually suing Liberty National. However several of the people included in the class action lawsuit disagreed with the settlement. Guy E. Adams, the plaintiff in this case, was one of those people.

== Question before the court ==
Does the Supreme Court of Alabama's approval of the settlement violate the Due Process Clause of the Fourteenth Amendment?

== Decision of the Supreme Court ==
In a unanimous decision in favor of Robertson, the opinion of the court was written per curiam. The court dismissed the writ of certiorari and noted that the State Supreme Court "did not expressly address the question on which certiorari was granted." Further, the court found that the petitioners had "failed to establish that they had properly presented the issues to that court." The court concluded that it could not answer the question before the court because it would "unbalance" the US dual system of government.
