= Lea Brilmayer =

American legal scholar

- Born: 1950 (age 75–76)

Academic background
- Education: University of California, Berkeley (BA, JD); Columbia University (LLM)

Academic work
- Discipline: International Law; Conflict of laws
- Institutions: Yale Law School

Roberta "Lea" Brilmayer (born 1950) is an American legal scholar. She is the Howard M. Holtzmann Professor of International Law at Yale Law School and an expert in conflict of laws, personal jurisdiction, and international law.

== Biography ==
Brilmayer received a bachelor's degree in mathematics from University of California, Berkeley. After beginning graduate studies in mathematics, she switched to law, graduating with a JD from UC Berkeley School of Law and an LLM from Columbia Law School.

Brilmayer was a professor at Yale until 1991 before leaving to be a professor at NYU School of Law. Prior to her first term at Yale, she was a professor at University of Chicago Law School, where she was at one time the only tenured female faculty member—a distinction she held in the 1980s at Yale as well. She returned to Yale Law School in 1998, teaching contracts and conflict of laws there. In addition to teaching at Yale, Chicago, and NYU, Brilmayer has taught at University of Texas School of Law, the University of Michigan Law School, Columbia Law School, and Harvard Law School.

In addition to her work as a law professor, Brilmayer has been involved in various international law issues. She served in a legal capacity for the nation of Eritrea in their dispute with Ethiopia over various issues, including war crimes, boundary disputes, and other issues related to the Eritrean–Ethiopian War of the late 1990s. She was the Legal Advisor to the Office of the President of Eritrea at the Eritrea-Ethiopia Claims Commission, an independent commission tasked by the Permanent Court of Arbitration with arbitrating the disputes between the two nations.

== Works ==
In addition to her teaching, Brilmayer is the author of an amica brief to the Supreme Court, as well as an arbiter in international law issues. She has been published in numerous legal journals, including the Yale Law Journal and Harvard Law Review. Additionally, she has also testified before congressional committees, including on the issue of gay marriage.

Her books include the following works:

- Justifying International Acts
- American Hegemony: Political Morality in a One-Superpower World
