= List of United States Supreme Court cases, volume 520 =

This is a list of all the United States Supreme Court cases from volume 520 of the United States Reports:

Case name	Citation	Date decided
United States v. Gonzales	520 U.S. 1	March 3, 1997
Warner-Jenkinson Co. v. Hilton Davis Chemical Co.	520 U.S. 17	1997
Arizonans for Official English v. Arizona	520 U.S. 43	1997
Adams v. Robertson	520 U.S. 83	1997
Commissioner v. Estate of Hubert	520 U.S. 93	1997
Young v. Harper	520 U.S. 143	1997
Bennett v. Spear	520 U.S. 154	1997
Turner Broadcasting System, Inc. v. FCC	520 U.S. 180	1997
United States v. Lanier	520 U.S. 259	1997
Young v. Fordice	520 U.S. 273	1997
Lambert v. Wicklund	520 U.S. 292	1997
In re Vey	520 U.S. 303	1997
Chandler v. Miller	520 U.S. 305	1997
Blessing v. Freestone	520 U.S. 329	1997
Timmons v. Twin Cities Area New Party	520 U.S. 351	1997
Richards v. Wisconsin	520 U.S. 385	1997
Board of Comm'rs of Bryan Cty. v. Brown	520 U.S. 397	1997
A municipality may not be held liable under § 1983 solely because it employs a tortfeasor. Instead, the plaintiff must identify deliberate action—a "policy" or "custom"—attributable to the municipality that directly caused a deprivation of federal rights.
Strate v. A-1 Contractors	520 U.S. 438	1997
Johnson v. United States	520 U.S. 461	1997
Reno v. Bossier Parish School Bd.	520 U.S. 471	1997
Inter-Modal Rail Employees Assn. v. Atchison, T. & S. F. R. Co.	520 U.S. 510	1997
Lambrix v. Singletary	520 U.S. 518	1997
Harbor Tug & Barge Co. v. Papai	520 U.S. 548	1997
Camps Newfound/Owatonna, Inc. v. Town of Harrison	520 U.S. 564	1997
Edwards v. Balisok	520 U.S. 641	1997
Edmond v. United States	520 U.S. 651	1997
United States v. Hyde	520 U.S. 670	1997
Clinton v. Jones	520 U.S. 681	1997
Suitum v. Tahoe Regional Planning Agency	520 U.S. 725	1997
United States v. LaBonte	520 U.S. 751	1997
McMillian v. Monroe County	520 U.S. 781	1997
De Buono v. NYSA-ILA Medical and Clinical Services Fund	520 U.S. 806	1997
Arkansas v. Farm Credit Servs. of Central Ark.	520 U.S. 821	1997
Boggs v. Boggs	520 U.S. 833	1997
Saratoga Fishing Co. v. J. M. Martinac & Co.	520 U.S. 875	1997
Lords Landing Village Condominium Council of Unit Owners v. Continental Ins. Co.	520 U.S. 893	1997
Bracy v. Gramley	520 U.S. 899	1997
Johnson v. Fankell	520 U.S. 911	1997
Gilbert v. Homar	520 U.S. 924	1997
Vey v. Clinton	520 U.S. 937	1997
Hughes Aircraft Co. v. United States ex rel. Schumer	520 U.S. 939	1997
Associates Commercial Corp. v. Rash	520 U.S. 953	1997
Mazurek v. Armstrong	520 U.S. 968	1997
