= Diamond v. Charles =

- Supreme Court of the United States

Argued November 5, 1985 Decided April 30, 1986
- Full case name: Eugene F. Diamond and Jasper F. Williams, et al. v. Allan G. Charles et al.
- Citations: 476 U.S. 54 (more) 106 S. Ct. 1697; 90 L. Ed. 2d 48

Case history
- Prior: United States Court of Appeals for the Seventh Circuit

Holding
- The State of Illinois, by failing to appeal, has indicated no direct interest in upholding the four sections of the Abortion Law at issue. A private party whose own conduct is neither implicated nor threatened by a criminal statute has no judicially cognizable interest in the statute's defense. The appeal is dismissed for want of jurisdiction.

Court membership
- Chief Justice Warren E. Burger Associate Justices William J. Brennan Jr. · Byron White; Thurgood Marshall · Harry Blackmun; Lewis F. Powell Jr. · William Rehnquist; John P. Stevens · Sandra Day O'Connor

Case opinions
- Majority: Blackmun, joined by Brennan, Marshall, Powell, Stevens, Burger (Part I), Rehnquist (Part I), O'Connor (Part I), White
- Concurrence: O'Connor (in part and in the judgment), joined by Burger, Rehnquist
- Concurrence: White (in the judgment)

Laws applied
- U.S. Const. art. III §2

Diamond v. Charles, 476 U.S. 54 (1986), was a United States Supreme Court case that determined that citizens do not have Article III standing to challenge the constitutionality of a state statute in federal court unless they possess a "direct stake" in the outcome.

== Background ==
Four physicians who provided abortion services in Illinois filed a class action lawsuit in the United States District Court for the Northern District of Illinois to challenge a 1979 amendment to the Illinois Abortion Law of 1975 which required doctors to provide a "parental consultation" before performing an abortion. This regulation added to the Illinois Abortion Parental Consent Act of 1977, which required written consent from both parents or the guardian of an unmarried minor before obtaining an abortion and imposed a 48-hour waiting period. If parental consent could not be obtained or was refused, the minor could seek court-authorized consent upon showing that "the pregnant minor fully understands the consequences of an abortion to her and her unborn child." Notice of the hearing was required to be sent to the parents by registered or certified mail.

On October 31, 1979, the district court granted the physicians' motion for a temporary restraining order in Charles v. Carey, 627 F.2d 772 (7th Cir. 1980), barring enforcement of the amended law. The State of Illinois did not appeal the finding that the amendment was unconstitutional. Eugene Diamond, on the basis of his conscientious objection to abortions, his status as a pediatrician, and as a parent of a minor daughter, filed a motion to intervene as a defendant of the law.

The U.S. Supreme Court, in dismissing the appeal, said "because the State alone is entitled to create a legal code, only the State has the kind of 'direct stake' identified in the Court's standing doctrine in defending the standards embodied in that code." The Court also said that Article III standing "is not to be placed in the hands of 'concerned bystanders,' who will use it simply as a 'vehicle for the vindication of value interests.'"

== See also ==
- Roe v. Wade, 410 U.S. 113 (1973)
