= Arizonans for Official English v. Arizona =

- Supreme Court of the United States

Argued December 4, 1996 Decided March 3, 1997
- Full case name: Arizonans for Official English and Robert D. Park, petitioners v. Arizona, et al.
- Citations: 520 U.S. 43 (more) 117 S. Ct. 1055; 137 L. Ed. 2d 170

Case history
- Prior: Yniguez v. Mofford, 730 F. Supp. 309 (D. Ariz. 1990); Yniguez v. Arizona, 939 F.2d 727 (9th Cir. 1991); cert. granted, 520 U.S. 43 (1997).

Court membership
- Chief Justice William Rehnquist Associate Justices John P. Stevens · Sandra Day O'Connor; Antonin Scalia · Anthony Kennedy; David Souter · Clarence Thomas; Ruth Bader Ginsburg · Stephen Breyer

Case opinion
- Majority: Ginsburg, joined by unanimous

Laws applied
- U.S. Const. art. III

Arizonans for Official English v. Arizona, 520 U.S. 43 (1996), was a United States Supreme Court decision that held that Article III required standing for each stage of litigation, rather than just when a complaint is filed.

== Background ==
In 1988, ballot initiative Proposition 106, mandating that state employees speak only English on the job passed with 50.5% of the vote. Arizona insurance claims manager Maria-Kelly Yniguez sued to overturn this law because she was concerned that she would be fired for speaking Spanish to claimants. However, on February 6, 1990, judge Paul Rosenblatt of the United States District Court for the District of Arizona ruled that the law violated the free speech clause of the First Amendment to the United States Constitution. The group Arizonans for Official English appealed to the United States Court of Appeals for the Ninth Circuit, and on December 7, 1994, that court upheld the Arizona federal court ruling. The U.S. Supreme Court accepted an appeal of the Ninth Circuit ruling on March 26, 1996.

== Opinion of the Court ==
Associate Justice Ruth Bader Ginsburg wrote for a unanimous court:

Federal courts lack competence to rule definitively on the meaning of state legislation, see, e.g., Reetz v. Bozanich, 397 U.S. 82, 86-87, 25 L. Ed. 2d 68, 90 S. Ct. 788 (1970), nor may they adjudicate challenges to state measures absent a showing of actual impact on the challenger, see, e.g., Golden v. Zwickler, 394 U.S. 103, 110, 22 L. Ed. 2d 113, 89 S. Ct. 956 (1969). The Ninth Circuit, in the case at hand, lost sight of these limitations. The initiating plaintiff, Maria-Kelly F. Yniguez, sought federal-court resolution of a novel question: the compatibility with the Federal Constitution of a 1988 amendment to Arizona's Constitution declaring English "the official language of the State of Arizona"-- "the language of . . . all government functions and actions." Ariz. Const., Art. XXVIII, §§ 1(1), 1(2). Participants in the federal litigation, proceeding without benefit of the views of the Arizona Supreme Court, expressed diverse opinions on the meaning of the amendment. ...

The Ninth Circuit had no warrant to proceed as it did. The case had lost the essential elements of a justiciable controversy and should not have been retained for adjudication on the merits by the Court of Appeals. We therefore vacate the Ninth Circuit's judgment, and remand the case to that court with directions that the action be dismissed by the District Court. We express no view on the correct interpretation of Article XXVIII or on the measure's constitutionality.

Furthermore, the court ruled Yniguez's complaint moot given that she resigned seven years before this decision.

== Subsequent developments ==
In 1999, the Supreme Court declined to hear another appeal by Arizonans for Official English in a case in which the Arizona Supreme Court overturned Proposition 106.

In 2006, Arizona voters passed Proposition 103 with 74% of the vote, requiring "all official actions of the government be conducted in English" with exceptions for certain duties.

== See also ==
- List of United States Supreme Court cases, volume 520
- List of United States Supreme Court cases
- Lists of United States Supreme Court cases by volume
