= Allen v. Wright =

- Supreme Court of the United States

Argued February 29, 1984 Decided July 3, 1984
- Full case name: Allen v. Wright, et al.
- Citations: 468 U.S. 737 (more) 104 S. Ct. 3315; 82 L. Ed. 2d 556; 1984 U.S. LEXIS 149; 52 U.S.L.W. 5110; 84-2 U.S. Tax Cas. (CCH) ¶ 9611; 54 A.F.T.R.2d (RIA) 5361

Case history
- Prior: Wright v. Miller, 480 F. Supp. 790 (D.D.C. 1979); reversed sub. nom., Wright v. Regan, 656 F.2d 820 (D.C. Cir. 1981); cert. granted, 462 U.S. 1130 (1983).

Holding
- Parties lack standing to sue where the policies of a government agency are alleged to be insufficient to prevent school segregation.

Court membership
- Chief Justice Warren E. Burger Associate Justices William J. Brennan Jr. · Byron White; Thurgood Marshall · Harry Blackmun; Lewis F. Powell Jr. · William Rehnquist; John P. Stevens · Sandra Day O'Connor

Case opinions
- Majority: O'Connor, joined by Burger, White, Powell, Rehnquist
- Dissent: Brennan
- Dissent: Stevens, joined by Blackmun
- Marshall took no part in the consideration or decision of the case.

Laws applied
- U.S. Const. art. III

Allen v. Wright, 468 U.S. 737 (1984), was a United States Supreme Court case that determined that citizens do not have standing to sue a federal government agency based on the influence that the agency's determinations might have on third parties.

== Background ==
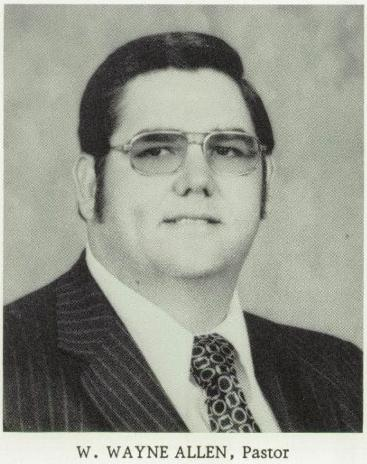
Pastor W. Wayne Allen, founder of the all white Briarcrest Christian School, was the intervener / defendant.

Per the Internal Revenue Code, the Internal Revenue Service is required to deny tax-exempt status to racially discriminatory private schools, and has established guidelines and procedures for determining whether a particular school is in fact racially nondiscriminatory. As a consequence, private schools deemed to be racially discriminatory are ineligible to receive tax deductible charitable contributions.

Plaintiffs/respondents, parents of African-American children in seven states where public schools had recently been desegregated, brought a nationwide class action lawsuit against the Internal Revenue Service in federal district court, contending that IRS guidelines and procedures for determining whether private schools were racially discriminatory, and subsequent denial of tax exempt status to such schools, were insufficient. Federal law prohibited tax-exempt status to private schools that discriminate on the basis of race, but the parents contended that the standards the IRS used to determine if a school was discriminating were not capable of identifying all of the discriminating private schools. White parents were therefore able to avoid integration by sending their children to the private schools and deducting charitable contributions to the institution, thereby making it harder for black children to attend integrated schools. The plaintiffs sued the IRS and W. Wayne Allen was granted permission to intervene as the defendant in his official capacity as the chairman of the board of Briarcrest Christian School, a segregation academy founded in 1973 in response to the desegregation of Memphis city schools.

Respondents also alleged that many racially segregated private schools (segregation academies) were created or expanded in respondents' communities at the time the public schools were undergoing desegregation, and had received tax exemptions despite the IRS policy and guidelines; and that these unlawful tax exemptions harmed respondents in that they constituted tangible financial aid for racially segregated educational institutions, and encouraged the organization and expansion of institutions that provided segregated educational opportunities for white students avoiding attendance in the public schools. Respondents did not allege that their children had ever applied or would ever apply for admission to any private school. Respondents sought declaratory and injunctive relief. The District Court dismissed the complaint on the ground that respondents lacked standing to bring the suit and the Court of Appeals reversed. The United States Supreme Court granted cert.

Two injuries were alleged:

1. Direct harm by government financial aid (through allowing tax deductions for donations) to discriminatory schools. This was argued to be a stigmatic injury because of the appearance of government approval for discrimination against Black people.
2. Tax exemptions for discriminatory schools impaired the ability of Black people to force desegregation of public schools, because white parents would simply withdraw their children from public schools and place them in discriminatory private schools.

== Issue ==
The Court framed the issue as whether the plaintiffs had standing to bring the lawsuit.

== Result ==
The Court said that the plaintiffs had no standing to bring this suit:

In essence the question of standing is whether the litigant is entitled to have the court decide the merits of the dispute or of particular issues. Standing doctrine embraces... the general prohibition on a litigant's raising another person's legal rights, the rule barring adjudication of generalized grievances more appropriately addressed in the representative branches, and the requirement that a plaintiff's complaint fall within the zone of interests protected by the law invoked. The requirement of standing, however, has a core component derived directly from the Constitution. A plaintiff must allege personal injury fairly traceable to defendant’s allegedly unlawful conduct and likely to be redressed by the requested relief.

The court found that the asserted right to hold the government to the law is not enough by itself to create standing to sue. Nor is discrimination enough unless the plaintiff is personally denied equal treatment by the government. Here, the link between IRS standards and school discrimination was too tenuous. The Court concluded that the doctrine of the separation of powers dictated this result, because otherwise the courts could always be called upon to restructure the Executive branch.

== Dissents ==
Justice Brennan wrote a dissenting opinion complaining that the use of separation of powers is a truism. He opined that the injury of the children's opportunities was enough to grant standing to sue.

Justice Stevens wrote that the allegation really is that the government is subsidizing white flight, which is sufficient to allow standing – the harm (lack of desegregated schools) was traceable to government conduct. Stevens also asserted that standing has nothing to do with separation of powers.

== See also ==
- Montgomery Academy One of the southern private schools named in the lawsuit and ruling.
