= Karcher v. May =

- Supreme Court of the United States

Argued October 6, 1987 Decided December 1, 1987
- Full case name: Karcher, Speaker of the New Jersey General Assembly, et al. v. May et al
- Docket no.: 85-1551
- Citations: 484 U.S. 72 (more) 108 S. Ct. 388; 98 L. Ed. 2d 327; 1987 U.S. LEXIS 5027

Case history
- Prior: May v. Cooperman, 572 F. Supp. 1561 (D.N.J. 1983); on reconsideration, 578 F. Supp. 1308 (D.N.J. 1984); affirmed, 780 F.2d 240 (3d Cir. 1985).

Holding
- Appellants intervened and participated throughout this lawsuit only in their official capacities as presiding officers on behalf of the state legislature. They no longer hold those offices, and the authority to pursue the lawsuit on behalf of the legislature has passed to their successors under Federal Rule of Appellate Procedure 43(c)(1).

Court membership
- Chief Justice William Rehnquist Associate Justices William J. Brennan Jr. · Byron White; Thurgood Marshall · Harry Blackmun; John P. Stevens · Sandra Day O'Connor; Antonin Scalia

Case opinions
- Majority: O'Connor, joined by Rehnquist, Brennan, Marshall, Blackmun, Stevens, Scalia
- Concurrence: White

Laws applied
- U.S. Const. Art. III, Federal Rule of Appellate Procedure 43(c)(1)

Karcher v. May, 484 U.S. 72 (1987), was a school prayer case in which the Supreme Court of the United States held that the former presiding officers of the New Jersey legislature did not have Article III standing to appeal a case, as that standing had passed on to their legislative successors.

== Background ==
In 1982, the New Jersey Legislature passed a statute over the governor's veto providing for a moment of silence in public schools, which failed to specifically mention prayer. May filed a lawsuit in the federal United States District Court for the District of New Jersey challenging the constitutionality of the statute; the executive-branch officials normally tasked with defending such suits (the Governor and the Attorney General) admitted the unconstitutionality of the statute and refused to defend it in court. Consequently, Alan Karcher, Speaker of the New Jersey General Assembly, and Carmen Orechio, President of the New Jersey Senate, moved to intervene (under Rule 24 of the Federal Rules of Civil Procedure) as defendants on behalf of the Legislature; the court granted the motion. In 1983, the District Court found that the purpose of the statute was religious, and deemed the law unconstitutional on First Amendment grounds.

Karcher and Orechio appealed, although by the time of filing their terms as Speaker and President had expired; their successors, Chuck Hardwick and John F. Russo, joined the executive officers in refusing to defend the constitutionality of the statute. Karcher and Orechio's lawyer, Rex E. Lee, nevertheless contended that their standing to continue to defend suit on the state's behalf remained, and also argued the purpose of the law was secular.

== Opinion of the Court ==
The court found that the former legislative leaders lacked standing, but that that authority had passed by design to the current leaders of the New Jersey legislature. Justice Sandra Day O'Connor's majority decision was joined by six other justices, with Justice Byron White writing a concurring opinion. There was no ninth vote, as Justice Lewis F. Powell, Jr. had resigned earlier in the year, and no replacement had yet been confirmed.

As a result of this opinion, the district court ruling that the law was unconstitutional was left intact.

== See also ==
- List of United States Supreme Court cases, volume 484
