= 2015 term opinions of the Supreme Court of the United States =

October 2015 to October 2016 opinions

The 2015 term of the Supreme Court of the United States began October 5, 2015, and concluded October 2, 2016. The table below illustrates which opinion was filed by each justice in each case and which justices joined each opinion.

== Table key ==
Delivered the court's opinion

Joined the court's opinion

Filed a concurrence

Joined a concurrence

Filed a dissent

Joined a dissent

Filed a concurrence/dissent

Joined a concurrence/dissent

Did not participate in the decision
- Decisions that do not note an argument date were decided without oral argument. Decisions that do not note a justice delivering the court's opinion are per curiam.
- Multiple concurrences and dissents within a case are numbered, with joining votes numbered accordingly. Justices frequently join multiple opinions in a single case; each vote is subdivided accordingly.
- An asterisk ( * ) in the court's opinion denotes that it was only a majority in part or a plurality. An asterisk in a joining vote denotes that the justice joined it only in part.
- A dash ( - ) denotes that the justice voted without filing or joining an opinion.

== 2015 term opinions ==
#	Case name and citation	Argued	Decided	Roberts	Scalia	Kennedy	Thomas	Ginsburg	Breyer	Alito	Sotomayor	Kagan
1	Maryland v. Kulbicki, 577 U.S. 1		October 5, 2015									
2	Mullenix v. Luna, 577 U.S. 7		November 9, 2015									
3	OBB Personenverkehr AG v. Sachs, 577 U.S. 27	October 5, 2015	December 1, 2015									
4	Shapiro v. McManus, 577 U.S. 39	November 4, 2015	December 8, 2015									
5	DIRECTV, Inc. v. Imburgia, 577 U.S. 47	October 6, 2015	December 14, 2015				1	2			2	
6	White v. Wheeler, 577 U.S. 73		December 14, 2015									
7	Bruce v. Samuels, 577 U.S. 82	November 4, 2015	January 12, 2016									
8	Hurst v. Florida, 577 U.S. 92	October 13, 2015	January 12, 2016									
9	Kansas v. Carr, 577 U.S. 108	October 7, 2015	January 20, 2016									
10	Montanile v. Board of Trustees of Nat. Elevator Industry Health Benefit Plan, 577 U.S. 136	November 9, 2015	January 20, 2016							*		
11	Campbell-Ewald v. Gomez, 577 U.S. 153	October 14, 2015	January 20, 2016	1	1					1 / 2		
12	Duncan v. Owens, 577 U.S. 189	January 12, 2016	January 20, 2016									
13	Montgomery v. Louisiana, 577 U.S. 190	October 13, 2015	January 25, 2016		1		1 / 2			1		
14	Musacchio v. United States, 577 U.S. 237	November 30, 2015	January 25, 2016									
15	Menominee Tribe of Wis. v. United States, 577 U.S. 250	December 1, 2015	January 25, 2016									
16	FERC v. Electric Power Supply Assn., 577 U.S. 260	October 14, 2015	January 25, 2016									
17	James v. Boise, 577 U.S. 306		January 25, 2016									
18	Amgen Inc. v. Harris, 577 U.S. 308		January 25, 2016									
19	Gobeille v. Liberty Mut. Ins. Co., 577 U.S. 312	December 2, 2015	March 1, 2016				1		2			
20	Lockhart v. United States, 577 U.S. 347	November 3, 2015	March 1, 2016									
21	Americold Realty Trust v. ConAgra Foods, Inc., 577 U.S. 378	January 19, 2016	March 7, 2016									
22	Wearry v. Cain, 577 U.S. 385		March 7, 2016									
23	V.L. v. E.L., 577 U.S. 404		March 7, 2016									
24	Caetano v. Massachusetts, 577 U.S. 411		March 21, 2016									
25	Sturgeon v. Frost, 577 U.S. 424	January 20, 2016	March 22, 2016									
26	Tyson Foods, Inc. v. Bouaphakeo, 577 U.S. 442	November 10, 2015	March 22, 2016							*		
27	Nebraska v. Parker, 577 U.S. 481	January 20, 2016	March 22, 2016									
28	Hawkins v. Community Bank, 577 U.S. 495	October 5, 2015	March 22, 2016									
29	Friedrichs v. California Teachers Assn., 578 U.S. 1	January 11, 2016	March 29, 2016									
30	Luis v. United States, 578 U.S. 5	November 10, 2015	March 30, 2016			1			*	1		2
31	Evenwel v. Abbott, 578 U.S. 54	December 8, 2015	April 4, 2016				1 / 2*			2		
32	Nichols v. United States, 578 U.S. 104	March 1, 2016	April 4, 2016									
33	Woods v. Etherton, 578 U.S. 113		April 4, 2016									
34	Welch v. United States, 578 U.S. 120	March 30, 2016	April 18, 2016									
35	Hughes v. Talen Energy Marketing, LLC, 578 U.S. 150	February 24, 2016	April 19, 2016				1				2	
36	Franchise Tax Bd. of Cal. v. Hyatt, 578 U.S. 171	December 7, 2015	April 19, 2016							-		
37	Molina-Martinez v. United States, 578 U.S. 189	January 12, 2016	April 20, 2016									
38	Bank Markazi v. Peterson, 578 U.S. 212	January 13, 2016	April 20, 2016				*					
39	Harris v. Arizona Independent Redistricting Commission, 578 U.S. 253	December 8, 2015	April 20, 2016									
40	Heffernan v. City of Paterson, 578 U.S. 266	January 19, 2016	April 26, 2016									
41	Ocasio v. United States, 578 U.S. 282	October 6, 2015	May 2, 2016	2			1				2	
42	Sheriff v. Gillie, 578 U.S. 317	March 29, 2016	May 16, 2016									
43	Spokeo, Inc. v. Robins, 578 U.S. 330	November 2, 2015	May 16, 2016									
44	Husky Int'l Electronics, Inc. v. Ritz, 578 U.S. 355	March 1, 2016	May 16, 2016									
45	Merrill Lynch, Pierce, Fenner & Smith Inc. v. Manning, 578 U.S. 374	December 1, 2015	May 16, 2016									
46	Zubik v. Burwell, 578 U.S. 403	March 23, 2016	May 16, 2016									
47	Kernan v. Hinojosa, 578 U.S. 412		May 16, 2016									
48	CRST Van Expedited, Inc. v. EEOC, 578 U.S. 419	March 28, 2016	May 19, 2016									
49	Betterman v. Montana, 578 U.S. 437	March 28, 2016	May 19, 2016				1			1	2	
50	Luna Torres v. Lynch, 578 U.S. 452	November 3, 2015	May 19, 2016									
51	Foster v. Chatman, 578 U.S. 488	November 2, 2015	May 23, 2016									
52	Wittman v. Personhuballah, 578 U.S. 439	March 21, 2016	May 23, 2016									
53	Green v. Brennan, 578 U.S. 547	November 30, 2015	May 23, 2016									
54	Army Corps of Engineers v. Hawkes Co., 578 U.S. 590	March 30, 2016	May 31, 2016			1	1	2		1		3
55	Johnson v. Lee, 578 U.S. 605		May 31, 2016									
56	Lynch v. Arizona, 578 U.S. 613		May 31, 2016									
57	Simmons v. Himmelreich, 578 U.S. 621	March 22, 2016	June 6, 2016									
58	Ross v. Blake, 578 U.S. 632	March 29, 2016	June 6, 2016				1		2			
59	Williams v. Pennsylvania, 579 U.S. 1	February 29, 2016	June 9, 2016	1			2			1		
60	Dietz v. Bouldin, 579 U.S. 40	April 26, 2016	June 9, 2016									
61	Puerto Rico v. Sanchez Valle, 579 U.S. 59	January 13, 2016	June 9, 2016				1 / 2	2				
62	Halo Electronics, Inc. v. Pulse Electronics, Inc., 579 U.S. 93	February 23, 2016	June 13, 2016									
63	Puerto Rico v. Franklin Cal. Tax-Free Trust, 579 U.S. 115	March 22, 2016	June 13, 2016									
64	United States v. Bryant, 579 U.S. 140	April 19, 2016	June 13, 2016									
65	Kingdomware Technologies, Inc. v. United States, 579 U.S. 162	February 22, 2016	June 16, 2016									
66	Universal Health Services, Inc. v. United States ex rel. Escobar, 579 U.S. 176	April 19, 2016	June 16, 2016									
67	Kirtsaeng v. John Wiley & Sons, Inc., 579 U.S. 197	April 25, 2016	June 16, 2016									
68	Encino Motorcars, LLC v. Navarro, 579 U.S. 211	April 20, 2016	June 20, 2016									
69	Utah v. Strieff, 579 U.S. 232	February 22, 2016	June 20, 2016					1* / 2			1	2
70	Cuozzo Speed Technologies, LLC v. Lee, 579 U.S. 261	April 25, 2016	June 20, 2016							*	*	
71	Taylor v. United States, 579 U.S. 301	February 23, 2016	June 20, 2016									
72	RJR Nabisco, Inc. v. European Community, 579 U.S. 325	March 21, 2016	June 20, 2016					* / 1	* / 1 / 2			* / 1
73	Fisher v. University of Tex. at Austin, 579 U.S. 365	December 9, 2015	June 23, 2016	2			1 / 2			2		
74	Birchfield v. North Dakota, 579 U.S. 438	April 20, 2016	June 23, 2016				1	2			2	
75	Mathis v. United States, 579 U.S. 500	April 26, 2016	June 23, 2016			1	2	1	1	2		
76	Dollar General Corp. v. Mississippi Band of Choctaw Indians, 579 U.S. 545	December 7, 2015	June 23, 2016									
77	United States v. Texas, 579 U.S. 547	April 18, 2016	June 23, 2016									
78	McDonnell v. United States, 579 U.S. 550	April 27, 2016	June 27, 2016									
79	Whole Woman's Health v. Hellerstedt, 579 U.S. 582	March 2, 2016	June 27, 2016	2			1 / 2			2		
80	Voisine v. United States, 579 U.S. 686	February 29, 2016	June 27, 2016								*	
#	Case name and citation	Argued	Decided	Roberts	Scalia	Kennedy	Thomas	Ginsburg	Breyer	Alito	Sotomayor	Kagan

== 2015 term membership and statistics ==
This was the eleventh term of Chief Justice Roberts's tenure. Justice Scalia died on February 13, 2016, making it the sixth and final term with the same membership.

Justice		Appointment history		Agreement with judgment		Opinions filed				
Seniority	Name	President	Date confirmed	%	#					Total
Chief Justice	John Roberts	George W. Bush	September 29, 2005	91.3%	73/80	6	1	0	4	11
Associate Justice	Antonin Scalia	Ronald Reagan	September 26, 1986	83.3%	15/18	2	1	0	2	5
Associate Justice	Anthony Kennedy	Ronald Reagan	February 18, 1988	97.5%	78/80	9	2	0	1	12
Associate Justice	Clarence Thomas	George H. W. Bush	October 23, 1991	72.5%	58/80	7	14	1	17	39
Associate Justice	Ruth Bader Ginsburg	Bill Clinton	August 10, 1993	87.5%	70/80	8	4	1	4	17
Associate Justice	Stephen Breyer	Bill Clinton	August 3, 1994	93.8%	75/80	8	5	1	2	16
Associate Justice	Samuel Alito	George W. Bush	January 31, 2006	82.1%	64/78	7	5	1	6	19
Associate Justice	Sonia Sotomayor	Barack Obama	August 6, 2009	81%	64/79	7	3	1	7	18
Associate Justice	Elena Kagan	Barack Obama	August 7, 2010	94.9%	75/79	8	1	0	3	12
Notes on statistics: Opinion counts only include the bench opinions listed above; opinions relating to orders or in-chambers opinions are not included.; Agreement with the Court's judgment does not guarantee agreement with the reasoning expressed in its opinion. A justice is not considered in agreement if they dissented even in part. Agreement percentages are based only on the listed cases in which a justice participated and are rounded to the nearest one-tenth of one percentage point.						Totals				
Notes on statistics: Opinion counts only include the bench opinions listed above; opinions relating to orders or in-chambers opinions are not included.; Agreement with the Court's judgment does not guarantee agreement with the reasoning expressed in its opinion. A justice is not considered in agreement if they dissented even in part. Agreement percentages are based only on the listed cases in which a justice participated and are rounded to the nearest one-tenth of one percentage point.						62	36	5	46	149
