= Martin Tolchin =

American journalist and author (1928–2022)

- Born: September 20, 1928; New York City, U.S.
- Died: February 17, 2022 (aged 93); Alexandria, Virginia, U.S.
- Education: University of Utah; New York Law School (JD)
- Occupations: Journalist; editor; newspaper founder
- Years active: 1954–2007
- Spouse: Susan Goldsmith (m. 1965; died 2016)
- Partner: Barbara Rosenfeld
- Children: 2

Martin Tolchin (September 20, 1928 – February 17, 2022) was an American journalist and author. He was a longtime political correspondent for The New York Times, and later co-founded The Hill and Politico.

== Early life and education ==
Tolchin was born in Brooklyn. He attended the University of Utah and New York Law School, and was in the U.S. Army during the Korean War. He stated in his memoir that he was prevented from practising law whilst in the army because he refused to reveal the identities of classmates who, like him, studied Marxism while at high school. His political activities, though they had taken place before he joined the Army, meant he was given a general discharge instead of an honorable one. This setback ended his hopes of a legal career.

== Career ==
After taking a job hunting course at the Veterans Administration and writing over 100 letters to prospective employers, Tolchin was hired by The New York Times as a copy boy. From there he progressed to writing features for the women's page, and then the metropolitan desk. He had a reputation for following New York mayor John Lindsay more closely than any other reporting from the paper, and broke stories on the city's troubled hospital system. Tolchin worked at the Times for 40 years, a stint split between New York (where he was City Hall bureau chief and a political and investigative reporter) and Washington (where he was a Congressional correspondent). At Washington, Tolchin reported on the Iran–Contra affair, the Anita Hill hearings and Washington's response to the New York City financial crisis.

In 1994, Tolchin founded The Hill alongside businessman and Democratic political insider Jerry Finkelstein, where he served as publisher and editor-in-chief until his retirement in 2004. The Hill positioned itself as a rival to the established Capitol Hill newspaper Roll Call, with Tolchin's promise of it being "wittier and more audacious." The Hill styled itself as an "equal opportunity basher", willing to target both Democrats and Republicans with its coverage. The launch of The Hill coincided with the Republican Revolution that brought Newt Gingrich to power as Speaker of the US House of Representatives, and in 1997 broke the story of a failed leadership bid against him. Finkelstein's son Jimmy, who inherited ownership of The Hill, said Tolchin "knew Washington from top to bottom." Tolchin helped launch Politico in 2007 and was a member of its founding editorial team.

Tolchin wrote several books, frequently co-authoring them with his wife Susan. These include his 1972 book To The Victor: Political Patronage from the Clubhouse to the White House which would be cited in multiple U.S. Supreme Court decisions including Elrod v. Burns and Branti v. Finkel.

== Personal life ==
Tolchin married journalist Susan Goldsmith, a political scientist, in 1965, and they remained married until her death in 2016. They had two children, Charles (d. 2003) and Karen.

Tolchin died from cancer at his home in Alexandria, Virginia, on February 17, 2022, at the age of 93. At the time of his death, he was in a relationship with Barbara Rosenfeld.

== Awards ==
- Everett M. Dirksen Prize for Distinguished Reporting of Congress

== Bibliography ==
- Martin Tolchin; Susan J. Tolchin (1971) To The Victor: Political Patronage from the Clubhouse to the White House
- Martin Tolchin; Susan J. Tolchin (1976). Clout: Womanpower and Politics
- Martin Tolchin; Susan J. Tolchin (2007) A World Ignited: How Apostles of Ethnic, Religious and Racial Hatred Torch the Globe
- Martin Tolchin; Susan J. Tolchin (2009) Glass Houses: Congressional Ethics And The Politics Of Venom
- Martin Tolchin; Susan J. Tolchin (2015) Pinstripe Patronage
- Martin Tolchin (autobiography, 2019) Politics, Journalism, and The Way Things Were
