= Redistricting in Arizona =

A map of congressional districts of Arizona, since 2023

The U.S. state of Arizona, in common with the other U.S. states, must redraw its congressional and legislative districts every ten years to reflect changes in the state and national populations. Redistricting normally follows the completion of the United States census, which is carried out by the federal government the first year of every decade; the most recent census took place in 2020. Historically, Arizona's legislature had control over the redistricting process. However, Proposition 106, passed in 2000, delegated the power to draw congressional and legislative boundaries to a bipartisan independent commission. The Arizona Independent Redistricting Commission (AIRC) comprises two Democrats, two Republicans, and one independent chair. County and local redistricting, which normally takes place along the same timeline as congressional and legislative redistricting, is carried out by the individual county and local governments rather than the AIRC.

== Background ==
Reapportionment of representatives between the states every ten years based on new census figures is required by Article I, Section 2 of the U.S. Constitution and Section 2 of the Fourteenth Amendment. The Constitution, Supreme Court jurisprudence and federal law allow significant latitude to the individual states to draw their congressional and legislative districts as they see fit, as long as each district contains roughly equivalent numbers of people (see Baker v. Carr, Wesberry v. Sanders, and Reynolds v. Sims) and provides for minority representation pursuant to the Voting Rights Act. While control over redrawing district lines has been in the hands of state legislators for most of American history, a number of states, including Arizona, have adopted independent or bipartisan commissions for redistricting purposes in the last twenty years.

The entire state of Arizona was a covered jurisdiction under Section 5 of the Voting Rights Act, meaning that any change in voting requirements or procedures must be approved by either the U.S. Department of Justice or the United States District Court for the District of Columbia before taking effect. At the end of the redistricting process, the state had to submit its maps and demonstrate "that the proposed voting change does not deny or abridge the right to vote on account of race, color, or membership in a language minority group," the latter primarily referring to, in the case of Arizona, non-Anglophone Hispanics.

The formula for Section 5 was struck down by the United States Supreme Court in Shelby County v. Holder, 570 U.S. 529 (2013). Since 2021 will be the first year Arizona is not required to "pre-clear" proposed maps with the US Department of Justice, groups previously protected under Section 5 due to past discrimination (Hispanics, and Native Americans) have concerns about how this will affect their representation. Under preclearance, the proposed boundaries could not have a retrogressive effect on the ability of minority groups to elect "their preferred candidates of choice."

== Arizona Independent Redistricting Commission (AIRC) ==
The AIRC was created when voters approved Proposition 106 in 2000, 56.1 percent to 43.9 percent. Proposition 106 amended the Arizona Constitution to create a bipartisan commission independent of the state legislature that would be tasked with redrawing congressional and legislative lines following the decennial census. The commission's mandate is to draw districts considering six factors and explicitly omitting from consideration a seventh factor. Per the text of the amendment: the seven factors are:

A. DISTRICTS SHALL COMPLY WITH THE UNITED STATES CONSTITUTION AND THE UNITED STATES VOTING RIGHTS ACT;

B. CONGRESSIONAL DISTRICTS SHALL HAVE EQUAL POPULATION TO THE EXTENT PRACTICABLE, AND STATE LEGISLATIVE DISTRICTS SHALL HAVE EQUAL POPULATION TO THE EXTENT PRACTICABLE;

C. DISTRICTS SHALL BE GEOGRAPHICALLY COMPACT AND CONTIGUOUS TO THE EXTENT PRACTICABLE;

D. DISTRICT BOUNDARIES SHALL RESPECT COMMUNITIES OF INTEREST TO THE EXTENT PRACTICABLE;

E. TO THE EXTENT PRACTICABLE, DISTRICT LINES SHALL USE VISIBLE GEOGRAPHIC FEATURES, CITY, TOWN AND COUNTY BOUNDARIES, AND UNDIVIDED CENSUS TRACTS;

F. TO THE EXTENT PRACTICABLE, COMPETITIVE DISTRICTS SHOULD BE FAVORED WHERE TO DO SO WOULD CREATE NO SIGNIFICANT DETRIMENT TO THE OTHER GOALS.

PARTY REGISTRATION AND VOTING HISTORY DATA SHALL BE EXCLUDED FROM THE INITIAL PHASE OF THE MAPPING PROCESS BUT MAY BE USED TO TEST MAPS FOR COMPLIANCE WITH THE ABOVE GOALS. THE PLACES OF RESIDENCE OF INCUMBENTS OR CANDIDATES SHALL NOT BE IDENTIFIED OR CONSIDERED.

Article 4 Part 2 Section 1 of the state Constitution prevents commissioners from considering incumbency or candidacy when drawing districts: "The places of residence of incumbents or candidates shall not be identified or considered." While most of Arizona's House delegation opposed Proposition 106, a number of important officials, including then-Arizona Attorney General and future Governor and Homeland Security Secretary Janet Napolitano, supported it.

=== Membership of the AIRC ===
The Arizona Constitution mandates that "by February 28 of each year that ends in one, an independent redistricting commission shall be established to provide for the redistricting of congressional and state legislative districts." The state Commission on Appellate Court Appointments solicits and reviews applications from the public and nominates 25 candidates – ten Democrats, ten Republicans and five independents. The Constitution also specifies that "within the three years previous to appointment, members shall not have been appointed to, elected to, or a candidate for any other public office, including precinct committeeman or committeewoman but not including school board member or officer, and shall not have served as an officer of a political party, or served as a registered paid lobbyist or as an officer of a candidate's campaign committee." The leaders of the two largest parties in both houses of the legislature (in practice, the Senate and House Democratic and Republican leaders) select one candidate each to be commissioners. Of the four commissioners selected by the legislature, no more than two may be from the same party or from the same county. Once the four partisan commissioners are set, they then select an independent chair from the list of candidates compiled by the Commission on Appellate Court Appointments. This fifth member is not subject to the county residency limit otherwise imposed, so in practice up to three members of the AIRC may be from a single county.

Once the membership of the commission is determined, several months of administrative and educational meetings and sessions follow. Actual map work and public fora usually begin in the late summer.

Article 4 Part 2 Section 1 of the Constitution grants Arizona's governor the power to remove any member of the commission "with the concurrence of two-thirds of the senate, for substantial neglect of duty, gross misconduct in office, or inability to discharge the duties of office." Arizona governor, Jan Brewer, became the first to exercise this prerogative when, on November 1, 2011 the Arizona Senate approved her removal of AIRC chairwoman Colleen Mathis by a party-line vote of 21–6. The Arizona Supreme Court, however, unanimously ruled Mathis's removal unconstitutional on November 17 and ordered her reinstatement as AIRC chairwoman.

Current commissioners

Commissioners for 2020 census redistricting:

- Erika Schupak Neuberg, independent of Maricopa County (chair)
- Derrick Watchman, Democrat of Apache County (vice chair)
- Shereen Lerner, Democrat of Maricopa County
- Douglas York, Republican of Maricopa County
- David Mehl, Republican of Pima County

Past commissioners

Past commissioners for 2010 census redistricting:

- Colleen Mathis, independent of Pima County (chair)
- Linda McNulty, Democrat of Pima County
- Jose Herrera, Democrat of Maricopa County
- Scott Freeman, Republican of Maricopa County
- Richard Stertz, Republican of Pima County

Past commissioners for 2000 census redistricting:

- Steven W. Lynn, independent of Pima County (chair)
- Daniel Elder, Republican of Pima County
- Joshua Hall, Democrat of Apache County
- James Huntwork, Republican of Maricopa County
- Andi Minkoff, Democrat of Maricopa County (vice chair)

=== Constitutionality of the AIRC ===
The Elections Clause of the federal constitution provides, "The Times, Places and Manner of holding Elections for Senators and Representatives, shall be prescribed in each State by the Legislature thereof." (emphasis added). Because the independent redistricting commission was created by voters through ballot initiative rather than by the legislature, the constitutionality of congressional district maps drawn by the commission was under dispute. (All agree the commission has authority to draw state district maps.) The Arizona Legislature filed suit in federal court, seeking to take back the power to draw congressional district lines. The case eventually went before the U.S. Supreme Court.

The Arizona Legislature was so confident that it would prevail in the U.S. Supreme Court that it even hired a firm to redraw the congressional district maps without waiting for the Court to make its decision.

On June 29, 2015, the U.S. Supreme Court rejected the legislature's argument in Arizona State Legislature v. Arizona Independent Redistricting Commission. The Court held the term "legislature" in the Elections Clause could be read broadly to mean "the power that makes laws," not just the two representative houses. Because Arizona Constitution granted voters exactly "the power that makes laws," the voters were not prohibited from adopting laws governing redistricting.

The court's decision left intact the independent redistricting commission's full authority, and implicitly upheld similar commissions in other states, notably the California Citizens Redistricting Commission.

The Supreme Court upheld the 2010 redistricting in Harris v. Arizona Independent Redistricting Commission.

== History of redistricting in Arizona ==
For most of Arizona's history – that is, the period between statehood in 1912 and the passage of Proposition 106 in 2000 – the legislature controlled the drawing of congressional and legislative districts. Until 1941, however, there was no congressional redistricting to be done, as Arizona only had a single at-large seat. The census of 1940 showed that Arizona's population had grown significantly enough to merit a second seat in the House of Representatives; in the 1942 midterm elections, Arizona sent two representatives to Congress for the first time. The state gained one seat after each of the censuses in 1960, 1970, 1980 and 1990; following explosive population growth in the nineties, the state added two congressional districts. Arizona's rapid growth since the 1960s was previously the result of sustained internal migration from the Northeast and Midwest and more recently from the Western United States to the Sun Belt, as well as steady immigration.

For 55 years, from Arizona's statehood in 1912 until 1967 politics at the state level were reliably Democratic, and evenly divided at the federal level, with Arizona's electoral votes going to Democratic presidential candidates in 7 elections, and to Republicans in 7. In the period from 1968 until 2018 Arizona was fairly reliably Republican in Presidential Elections, although at the state level Democrats held the majority offices during some periods, and Republicans held the majority others. The only Democratic presidential nominee to carry Arizona during this period was Bill Clinton in 1996. In 2018 Arizona saw a "blue shift" statewide for Democrats with Kyrsten Sinema's Senate win and additional statewide office wins by Democrats Katie Hobbs, Kathy Hoffman and Sandra Kennedy. Additionally, Ann Kirkpatrick's win in AZ-02 created a majority Democratic US House Delegation from Arizona. This shift continued in 2020 with Democrats adding seats in the state house and senate, as well as Mark Kelly's Senate seat and Joe Biden's win in 2020.

The Hispanic population has risen by 46% in the last ten years. Due to this change, and other demographic changes, including relocation to Arizona from other western states, Arizona has become more competitive politically and President Obama’s 2012 reelection campaign manager stated he believed Obama could win the state.

=== 2010 redistricting ===
Between 2000 and 2010 Arizona's population grew by 1,261,385 people, from 5,130,632 to 6,392,017, a 24.6 percent increase. This represented the second highest population growth rate in the country after Nevada and far outpaced the national average, resulting in Arizona gaining a ninth congressional seat through reapportionment. The AIRC for the 2011–2020 cycle started administrative meetings in March 2011 and held its first official mapping meeting on August 18, 2011. Through the spring and summer, the committee held meetings and public fora around the state to solicit public input. The AIRC approved draft congressional and draft legislative maps on October 3 and October 10 respectively and has completed two rounds of hearings gauging Arizonans' reactions to the draft maps.

Population growth over the first decade of the century was concentrated in the exurbs of Phoenix. To Maricopa County's southeast, Pinal County, once sparsely populated, grew by 100 percent, to 375,770. Communities to the west of the capital also expanded substantially. Demographically, "the Hispanic population grew by 46 percent statewide over the last decade – more than twice the growth of all other ethnic groups."

The draft congressional map, which was approved by the commission by a vote of 3–1 with one abstention, was seen by outside observers as generally favorable to Democrats; neither Republican member voted in favor of it. Several Democratic incumbents, including Raul Grijalva and Gabby Giffords, were drawn into slightly more Democratic districts. Additionally, the 9th district, based in Tempe and comprising much of the old 5th district, would be competitive and possibly Democratic-leaning, having voted for John Kerry in 2004 and Barack Obama in 2008. Two freshman representatives, Paul Gosar and Ben Quayle, faced the choice of running in much less Republican districts or moving to safer districts where they could potentially face competitive primaries. Maricopa County would continue to dominate the state's politics under the new map: eight of Arizona's nine congressional districts extend into its more than 3.8 million-person territory.

In an unprecedented vote on November 1, 2011, the Arizona Senate approved Governor Jan Brewer's removal of the AIRC's independent chairwoman, Colleen Mathis, under allegations of gross misconduct. On November 17, the Arizona Supreme Court summarily and unanimously overturned Governor Brewer's removal of Mathis, ordering her reinstatement as commission chair. Mathis, who denied all wrongdoing, attempted to have the Arizona Supreme Court stop the Senate from voting to remove her, but the vote took place before the case could go forward. Brewer also attempted to remove both Democratic members of the commission in the same motion, but the Senate declined to vote on those removals. Attorneys for Mathis and the AIRC brought suit to the state Supreme Court asking it "to rule the governor exceeded her legal authority in dismissing Mathis, and the Senate acted illegally in ratifying Brewer's decision." While Brewer's office and Republicans in the Arizona legislature defended their actions as part of their constitutional prerogatives, Democrats and the authors of Proposition 106 contend Mathis's removal was politically motivated and not justified by any of the violations alleged by Republicans. In the following days, Arizona's two major newspapers, The Arizona Republic and Arizona Daily Star, penned editorials condemning the move, writing that though the allegations against Mathis merit investigation, they do not rise to the level of "gross misconduct." The Star opined, "It appears that Mathis' real misdeed is putting out for public comment a map that the governor and fellow Republicans think is wrong."

On November 17, the Supreme Court ruled against the Brewer administration, finding that "the governor did not demonstrate substantial grounds for removing Mathis from the head of the redistricting panel." The court ordered her reinstated as chairwoman of the AIRC.

With the reinstatement of Chairman Mathis, the AIRC continued drawing and finalizing the maps. In an attempt to ensure that the process was fair and transparent, the commission held 58 business meetings and 43 public hearings in locations all over the state, for a total of over 359 hours in an 11-month period. There were a total of over 5,000 attendees at those meetings, and 2,350 speaking requests were granted. The commission streamed almost every meeting to the internet, allowing another 1,850 distinct viewers to join. After these meetings and the continued deliberations of the committee, the AIRC submitted the final congressional and legislative maps to the Department of Justice on February 9, 2012 and February 28, 2012 respectively for preclearance under the Voting Rights Act. The Justice Department approved the maps on April 9, 2012 and April 26, 2012 respectively.

== See also ==
- Elections in Arizona
- 2020 United States census
- 2020 United States redistricting cycle
