= Heffernan v. City of Paterson =

- Supreme Court of the United States

Argued January 19, 2016 Decided April 26, 2016
- Full case name: Jeffrey Heffernan, Petitioner v. City of Paterson, et al.
- Docket no.: 14-1280
- Citations: 578 U.S. 266 (more) 136 S. Ct. 1412; 194 L. Ed. 2d 508
- Opinion announcement: Opinion announcement

Case history
- Prior: Jury verdict for plaintiff; judge recused for conflict of interest and case reassigned; summary judgement in favor of the defense, No. 2:06-cv-03882 (D.N.J. May 23, 2011); reversed and remanded, 492 F. App'x 225 (3d Cir. 2012); summary judgment granted on remand, 2 F. Supp. 3d 563 (D.N.J. 2014); affirmed, 777 F.3d 147 (3d Cir. 2015); cert. granted, 136 S. Ct. 29 (2015).

Holding
- Police department's demotion of detective in response to mistaken belief he was supporting a challenger to the city's mayor in election violated his First Amendment rights regardless of his actual purpose. Third Circuit reversed and remanded.

Court membership
- Chief Justice John Roberts Associate Justices Anthony Kennedy · Clarence Thomas; Ruth Bader Ginsburg · Stephen Breyer; Samuel Alito · Sonia Sotomayor; Elena Kagan

Case opinions
- Majority: Breyer, joined by Roberts, Kennedy, Ginsburg, Sotomayor, Kagan
- Dissent: Thomas, joined by Alito

Laws applied
- U.S. Const. amend. I 42 U.S.C. § 1983

Heffernan v. City of Paterson, 578 U.S. 266 (2016), was a United States Supreme Court case in 2016 concerning the First Amendment rights of public employees. By a 6–2 margin, the Court held that a public employee's constitutional rights might be violated when an employer, believing that the employee was engaging in what would be protected speech, disciplines them because of that belief, even if the employee did not exercise such a constitutional right.

The case was brought after Jeffrey Heffernan, a detective with the Paterson, New Jersey, police force, went to a distribution center and picked up a lawn sign for the candidate challenging the city's incumbent mayor in the 2005 election (Heffernan's mother had wanted a sign, so he was getting one for her). While Heffernan did not support the challenger, after other officers saw him with the sign they told senior officers, including the police chief, who strongly supported the mayor. For his apparent public support of the other candidate, they demoted Heffernan to beat patrol work as a uniformed officer.

Heffernan brought suit alleging that his demotion violated his First Amendment rights. The case took a decade to reach the Supreme Court. For most of that time it was in federal district court, where it was heard by three different judges. A jury verdict in Heffernan's favor was set aside. A later summary judgment in the city's favor was overturned on appeal before being granted again in the third trial.

Writing for a majority of the Supreme Court, Justice Stephen Breyer stated that the department's belief was all that mattered, since the Court's precedent in this area holds it is unconstitutional for a government agency to discipline an employee (who does not work under a contract that explicitly permits such discipline) for engaging in partisan political activity, as long as that activity is not disruptive to the agency's operations. Even if Heffernan was not engaging in protected speech, he wrote, the discipline against him sent a message to others to avoid exercising their rights. Justice Clarence Thomas wrote a dissenting opinion in which he was joined by Justice Samuel Alito, in which he agreed that Heffernan had been harmed, but his constitutional rights had not been violated.

== Legal background ==
The First Amendment guarantees the rights of freedom of speech and peaceable assembly, among others. While not explicitly mentioned, the Supreme Court has held that the right to assembly includes the freedom of association, particularly political association. These protections not only prohibit the government from passing laws which infringe upon these rights, but also from taking actions which would violate them. While the Bill of Rights—which includes the First Amendment—applied originally only to the federal government, the ratification of the Fourteenth Amendment allowed for the application of the Bill of Rights to the states under the incorporation doctrine.

In order to better protect these rights in the Reconstruction Era, Congress passed the Second Enforcement Act of 1871 at the request of President Ulysses S. Grant to better counter white supremacist organizations such as the Ku Klux Klan that were intimidating and suppressing voting by black citizens. The act provided a remedy for those citizens who were deprived of their constitutional rights under the "color of any statute, ordinance, regulation, custom, or usage, of any State or Territory or the District of Columbia" and is currently codified at 42 U.S.C. § 1983. With its decision in Monroe v. Pape (1961), the Court expanded the reach of section 1983 such that it is now used as a method of checking abuse by state officials who infringe upon constitutionally protected rights.

The First Amendment protects public employees from retaliation by their employer when speaking on matters of public concern. In Pickering v. Board of Education (1968), the Court first articulated the right of public employees to be protected from dismissal for exercising their right to free speech. There, the Supreme Court ruled in favor of a teacher who was fired after writing a letter to a local newspaper critical of its handling of a recent bond issue. Eight years later, this protection from dismissal was extended to cover partisan political ideology and affiliation in Elrod v. Burns.

But the Court has recognized that the "government as employer" has wider constitutional latitude in its decisions than the "government as sovereign". In order to adequately delineate the limits of the government-as-employer's discretion, the Court developed a framework in Connick v. Myers (1983) known as the Connick test. It consists of two elements. The first is the threshold a plaintiff must pass to state a claim: the plaintiff must show that they were speaking on a matter of public concern. The second falls to the employer: they must show that the harm to workplace efficiency outweighs the harm caused by infringing upon the right to free speech.

In Waters v. Churchill (1994), the Court was faced with two differing accounts of the speech at issue. The question presented to the Court was whether the Connick test ought be applied to what the employer thought was said or what was actually said. The case revolved around a nurse dismissed for a conversation she had with a coworker. There was a discrepancy between what she argued was said and what her employer thought was said. Justice Sandra Day O'Connor, joined by a plurality of justices, opined that the Connick test must be applied to the speech the employer thought occurred, and on which it acted, rather than that which the finder of fact determines did occur.

== Prior history ==
=== Original dispute ===
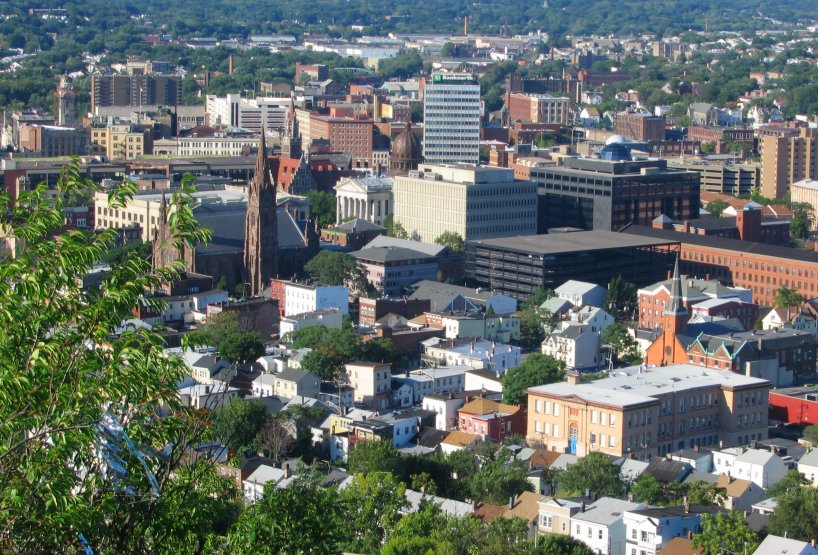
Downtown Paterson

In 2005, Jeffrey Heffernan was a detective with the Paterson, New Jersey, police. His supervisor and the chief of police were both appointed by the city's incumbent mayor, Jose Torres, who was being challenged by city councilman Lawrence Spagnola in that year's election. Heffernan was friendly with Spagnola, a former police chief, and informally supported his campaign. He could not vote in the election as he did not live in the city. At the request of his sick mother, who did live in the city, Heffernan while off-duty picked up a Spagnola lawn sign for her after her previous sign was stolen. Other officers saw him at the distribution location holding a sign and talking to Spagnola campaign staff. They soon notified superiors, and the next day officials demoted Heffernan from detective to patrol officer for his perceived "overt involvement" with the Spagnola campaign.

=== District court ===
Heffernan sued the city, the mayor, and his superior officers under 42 U.S.C. §1983 in the federal District Court for New Jersey, claiming that his rights of freedom of speech as well as freedom of association had been violated. Heffernan contended that while he had not actually engaged in any protected speech, the department acted on the belief that he had, and the department should not have demoted him on the basis of that erroneous belief.

In 2009, a jury found for Heffernan and awarded him damages from the police officials and the city. Despite the verdict, Heffernan sought a retrial because Judge Peter G. Sheridan had not allowed him to pursue the freedom of speech claim; the defense did so as well because Judge Sheridan had allowed the freedom of association claim. While considering these motions, Judge Sheridan became aware of a conflict of interest through a former law firm and set aside the verdict, setting a new date for trial before Judge Dennis M. Cavanaugh.

Judge Cavanaugh granted summary judgment to the defendants on the freedom of speech claim based on their earlier motions, holding that Heffernan had not engaged in protected speech so his rights could not have been violated. In 2012, the Third Circuit Court of Appeals reversed Judge Cavanaugh's ruling and remanded the case to him with instructions that he was to allow Heffernan to present his freedom of association claim and consider the facts from the jury trial when reconsidering the summary-judgment motions.

Judge Kevin McNulty heard the case on remand. After considering the parties' motions for summary judgment again, he ruled in the city's favor in 2014. Heffernan, he ruled, had not engaged in any protected speech or expressive conduct. Judge McNulty also ruled that Heffernan could not prevail on claims that his perceived speech was protected, per Ambrose v. Robinson Township, a previous case on that issue in the Third Circuit, or that his actions were protected since they aided and abetted speech. Judge McNulty also rejected similar claims for freedom of association. He decided that Dye v. Office of the Racing Commission, a case in which the Sixth Circuit had held that the First Amendment reached perceived political association, was not a precedent he could rely on since Dye itself explicitly rejected Ambrose, and as a district judge he could not reject circuit precedent.

=== Court of Appeals ===
On appeal to the Third Circuit, a three-judge panel of Judge Robert Cowen, Judge Morton Ira Greenberg and Judge Thomas I. Vanaskie unanimously held for the city. In a decision issued in 2015, Judge Vanaskie, writing for the Court, reiterated Judge McNulty's finding that Heffernan's actions in picking up the sign for his mother did not constitute protected speech or association. He distinguished the case at hand from the Sixth Circuit's ruling in Dye by noting that in that case, the employers had inferred the employees' intent from their non-participation in partisan politics rather than an actual action they had taken, as had occurred in Heffernan's case.

Judge Vanaskie instead found guidance from the Supreme Court's 1994 holding in Waters v. Churchill, in which it had upheld an Illinois public hospital's dismissal of a nurse for her comments about a supervisor to a colleague, despite an ongoing factual dispute about the substance of those comments. The Court found that the hospital administration had made a reasonable attempt to investigate what the nurse had said before firing her. In that case, the Court had said explicitly that disciplining employees for things they did not actually do did not rise to the level of a constitutional violation.

=== Supreme Court ===
Following the Third Circuit's decision, Heffernan petitioned the Supreme Court for certiorari, requesting they hear the case. After the Court considered both Heffernan's petition and the city's reply, it granted the petition on the first day of the 2015 term. Both parties consented to the filing of amicus curiae briefs by uninvolved parties who believed they had a stake in the outcome of the case. The National Association of Government Employees, Becket Fund for Religious Liberty, and Thomas Jefferson Center for the Protection of Free Expression filed amicus briefs in support of Heffernan, while the New Jersey State League of Municipalities and the National Conference of State Legislatures filed briefs in support of the City of Paterson. The United States government also filed an amicus brief in support of Heffernan, as well as a motion to appear at oral argument, which the Court granted, meaning the Solicitor General's office would be appearing at oral arguments, held on January 19, 2016.

==== Oral arguments ====
External videos
- Heffernan v. City of Paterson Oral Argument, C-SPAN

Mark Frost, arguing for petitioner Jeffrey Heffernan, was immediately met with questions from the justices: Anthony Kennedy asked for clarification on the particular right to be protected, and Antonin Scalia, Samuel Alito and Chief Justice John Roberts all questioned him about whether his rights could be infringed if he was not actually engaged in any speech. Justice Scalia (who died before the decision was announced) argued that there was "no constitutional right not to be fired for the wrong reason."

Frost responded that the motives of the government, rather than the actions of the individual, were important in this case. Assistant to the Solicitor General Ginger Anders, arguing on behalf of the United States as amicus curiae in favor of Heffernan, continued this argument, stating that there is "a First Amendment right not to have adverse action taken against him by his employer for the unconstitutional purpose of suppressing disfavored political beliefs."

Arguing for respondents, Thomas Goldstein distinguished between political neutrality and political apathy. He argued that the First Amendment protects political neutrality, the conscious choice to not take a position, but does not protect political apathy, when a person simply does not care and makes no particular choice to be neutral. As Heffernan claimed that he had no affiliation with Spagnola, the respondents argued that Heffernan's actions constitute unprotected apathy rather than a conscious choice of neutrality. Justice Elena Kagan questioned Goldstein as to the purpose of the First Amendment saying, "the idea has to do with why the government acted" to which he responded, "It's called an individual right, not a government wrong." Frost took a rebuttal to respond to Goldstein's distinction between political neutrality and apathy, arguing that there is little distinction as the government is acting for impermissible reasons in both cases.

== Opinion of the Court ==
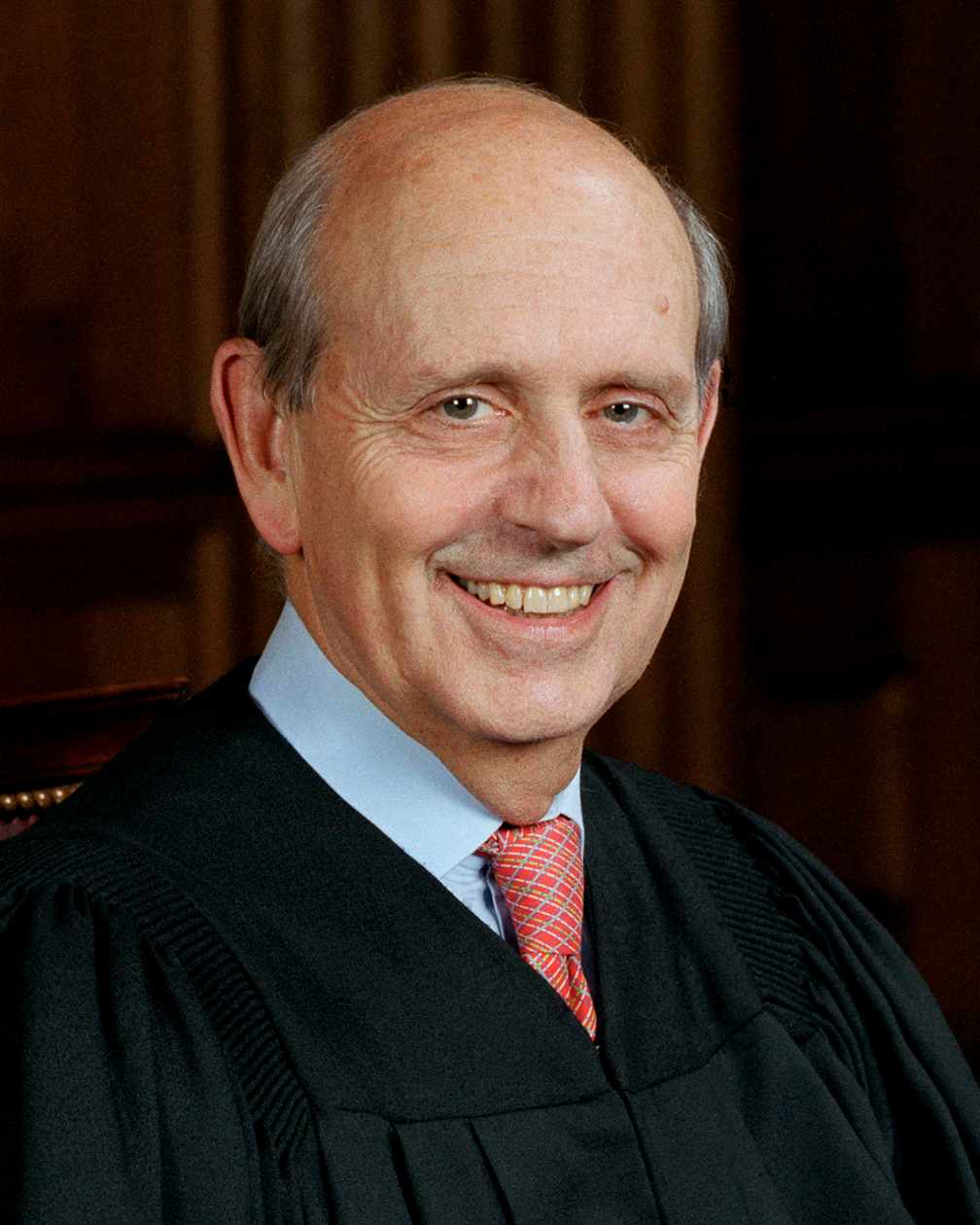
Justice Stephen Breyer delivered the opinion of the Court.

In a 6–2 decision authored by Justice Stephen Breyer, the Court reversed the ruling of the lower court and ruled that the employer's motive is material to First Amendment challenges. Citing Waters v. Churchill, Justice Breyer wrote,

[W]e conclude that, as in Waters, the government's reason for demoting Heffernan is what counts here. When an employer demotes an employee out of a desire to prevent the employee from engaging in political activity that the First Amendment protects, the employee is entitled to challenge that unlawful action under the First Amendment ... —even if, as here, the employer makes a factual mistake about the employee's behavior.

The Court remanded the case to the Third Circuit and made clear in its opinion that, while it is impermissible to retaliate based upon perceived protected speech, the lower courts should take into consideration whether Heffernan was disciplined for violating any different and neutral policies. The majority provided three main arguments in support of its reasoning: that their interpretation is more in line with the text of the First Amendment, that it better served the First Amendment's purpose of limiting political patronage, and that such an interpretation will not significantly burden employers.

Justice Breyer argued that unlike the Fourteenth Amendment, which focuses on the rights of the people, the First Amendment focuses on the actions of the government when it says, "Congress shall make no law ... abridging the freedom of speech." As the text of the amendment focuses on the government's abilities to make laws, it is the government's actions and motives, not the actual actions of citizens, which are proscribed by the Amendment. While the policy at issue was not a law of Congress, the actions were still that of a government official that infringed upon rights guaranteed by the First Amendment.

The Court supported this interpretation by recognizing that the First Amendment sought to prevent government actions from discouraging protected activity. Citing Branti v. Finkel, the Court pointed out that precedent never required plaintiffs in political affiliation cases to show change in allegiance to be successful, and similarly extended that logic to this case: the potential chilling effect on constitutionally protected speech still exists, regardless of the factual basis of the employer's reasoning. Because employees thinking of engaging in protected activity will be equally dissuaded by an incorrect dismissal as by a correct dismissal, both reasonings should be considered in violation of the First Amendment.

Respondents argued that finding employers liable for factual mistakes would place substantial costs upon employers. The Court rejected this argument, saying that an employee would still need to prove the employer acted out of an improper motive. Referring to Heffernan's case and those like it, the Court said that "the employee will, if anything, find it more difficult to prove that motive, for the employee will have to point to more than his own conduct to show an employer's intent".

=== Dissent ===
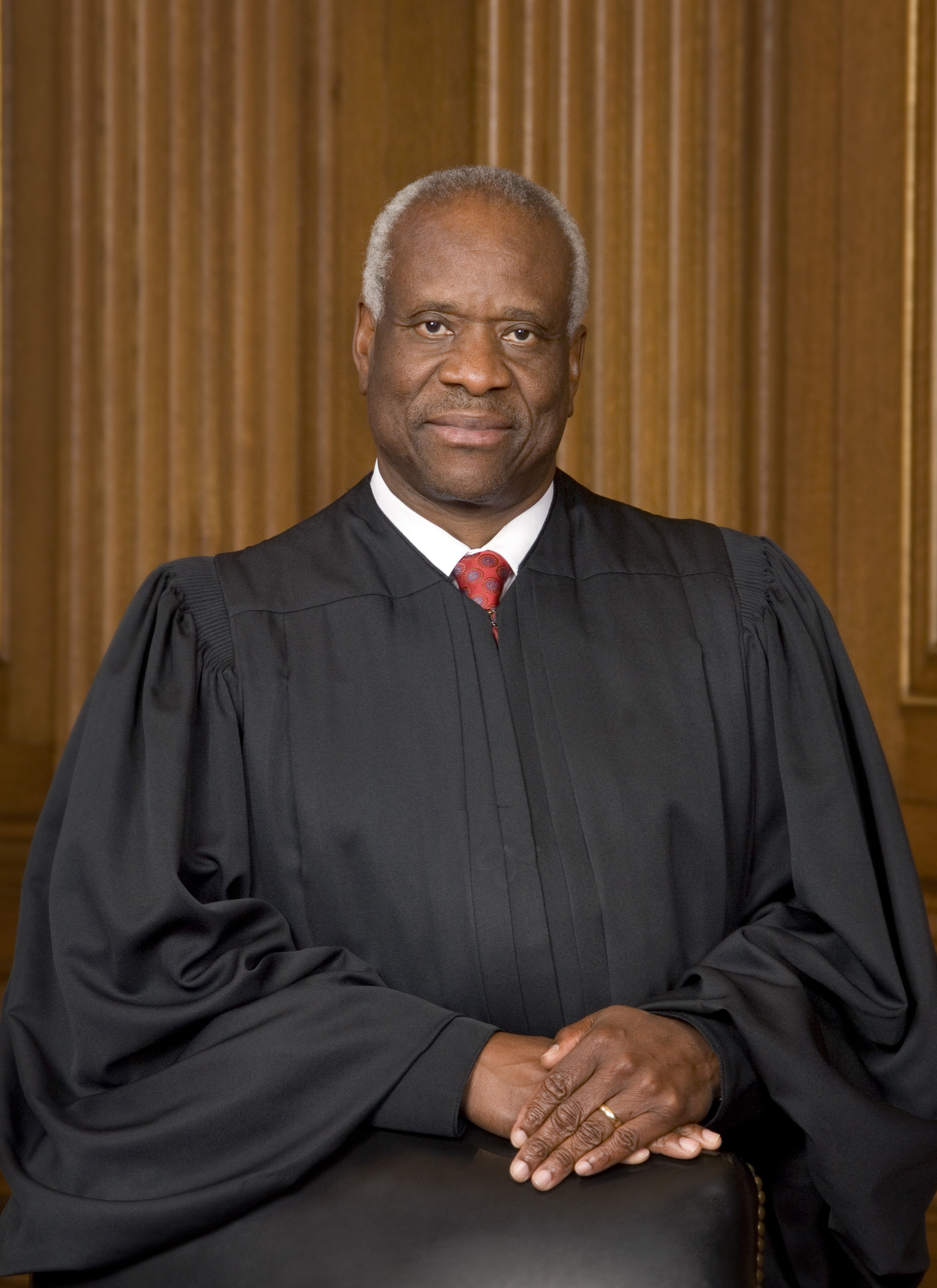
Justice Thomas authored the dissent.

Justice Clarence Thomas authored the dissent, in which Justice Samuel Alito joined. Justice Thomas argued that the previous ruling should have been upheld "because federal law does not provide a cause of action to plaintiffs whose constitutional rights have not been violated". The dissent focused on the text of the statute Heffernan was suing under: 42 U.S.C. § 1983. The statute provides a cause of action only for those whose rights have actually been violated by the government. Because Heffernan maintained that he had not been exercising his First Amendment rights, the dissent argued that those rights could not have been violated, and that a section 1983 claim requires that the employee engage in protected activity and that the employer retaliate against that activity.

The dissent argued that, for a section 1983 claim to be valid, "harm alone is not enough; it has to be the right kind of harm." Thomas provided an example of a law allowing police to pull over any driver without cause. This would obviously violate the Fourth Amendment rights of anyone stopped, but people stuck in traffic who were injured by the collateral damage of unconstitutional actions would not be able to sue because none of their rights was violated. Similarly, it is not enough for Heffernan to have shown injury but violation of an actual right as well. For the dissent, even if the dismissal was for the wrong reason and harm was suffered, the dismissal cannot infringe upon rights he never exercised.

Further supporting their argument, the dissent cited Monterey v. Del Monte Dunes at Monterey, Ltd. to argue that a Section 1983 claim falls under tort law, in order to draw a distinction between how attempts are handled under tort and criminal law. Under criminal law, a factually impossible attempt to commit a crime, such as trying to steal from an empty pocket or defraud someone with no money, can still be tried as an attempt. No such doctrine exists in tort law. Because Heffernan was not engaged in protected activity, the police department could only have attempted to deprive him of his right, so his suit must fail because "there are no attempted torts."

== Commentary ==
The day after oral arguments, writer Gilad Edelman criticized the Court's assumption that Heffernan never exercised his First Amendment rights, saying, "the Supreme Court may miss an opportunity to make sure that cases like his really are rare." Edelman interpreted Heffernan's actions as being well within the existing First Amendment precedent. Though Heffernan was not necessarily supporting the candidate, he was talking and associating with people connected to the candidate, actions already protected under existing precedent. Edelman suggested that, regardless of whether or not Heffernan intended to be identified as supporting the campaign, he was still punished by the city for associating.

Soon after the ruling was announced, the decision was largely praised. Jonathan Stahl, a writer at the Constitution Daily, said that "[t]he potential impact of this case on our understanding of the First Amendment is notable." Similarly, The Economist called it "good law" and a "significant development" for expanding the existing jurisprudence to perceived speech, not just actual speech.

== Aftermath ==
Subsequent to the Supreme Court's ruling, the City of Paterson approved a $1.6 million settlement payout to Heffernan. The final payment of the settlement was due on September 30, 2017.

== See also ==
- US labor law
- Spoils system
- 2015 term opinions of the Supreme Court of the United States
- List of United States Supreme Court cases involving the First Amendment
- List of United States Supreme Court cases, volume 578
