= List of United States Supreme Court cases, volume 579 =

This is a list of all the United States Supreme Court cases from volume 579 of the United States Reports:

Case name	Docket no.	Date decided
Williams v. Pennsylvania	579 U.S. 1	June 9, 2016
Chief Justice Castille's denial of the recusal motion and his subsequent judicial participation violated the Due Process Clause of the Fourteenth Amendment.
Dietz v. Bouldin	579 U.S. 40	June 9, 2016
A federal district court may rescind a discharge order and recall jurors for further service in the same case, but this power should be used cautiously. In this particular case, the judge did not abuse his authority. The judgment of the Ninth Circuit is affirmed.
Puerto Rico v. Sanchez Valle	579 U.S. 59	June 9, 2016
The dual sovereignty doctrine does not apply to the U.S. territory of Puerto Rico. Therefore, the Double Jeopardy Clause bars Puerto Rico and the United States from successively prosecuting a single person for the same conduct under equivalent criminal laws.
Halo Elec., Inc. v. Pulse Elec., Inc.	579 U.S. 93	June 13, 2016
The two-part Seagate test, used to determine when a district court may increase damages for patent infringement, is not consistent with Section 284 of the Patent Act.
Puerto Rico v. Franklin Cal. Tax-Free Tr.	579 U.S. 115	June 13, 2016
Chapters 9 and 11 of the Federal Bankruptcy Code preempt the corresponding sections of the Puerto Rico Public Corporation Debt Enforcement and Recovery Act because states may not enact municipal bankruptcy laws, and the territory Puerto Rico is usually included in the definition of a "state" within the Federal Bankruptcy Code.
United States v. Bryant	579 U.S. 140	June 13, 2016
Tribal-court convictions from proceedings that complied with Indian Civil Rights Act of 1968 may be used as predicate offenses in subsequent prosecution.
Kingdomware Technologies, Inc. v. United States	579 U.S. 162	June 16, 2016
The Department of Veterans Affairs must apply the "Rule of Two" when considering and awarding contracts under the Veterans Benefits, Health Care, and Information Technology Act of 2006. The rule is mandatory, not discretionary, regardless of whether the rule is being used to meet annual minimum contracting goals.
Universal Health Services, Inc. v. United States ex rel. Escobar	579 U.S. 176	June 16, 2016
The implied false certification theory can be a basis for False Claims Act liability when a defendant submitting a claim makes specific representations about the goods or services provided, but fails to disclose noncompliance with material statutory, regulatory, or contractual requirements that make those representations misleading with respect to those goods or services.
Kirtsaeng v. John Wiley & Sons, Inc.	579 U.S. 197	June 16, 2016
When deciding whether to award attorney's fees under the Copyright Act's fee-shifting provision, a district court should give substantial weight to the objective reasonableness of the losing party's position, while still taking into account all other circumstances relevant to granting fees. There is no particular presumption against awarding fees.
Encino Motorcars, LLC v. Navarro	579 U.S. 211	June 20, 2016
Courts cannot apply Chevron deference to a regulation that is procedurally defective or lacks an adequate explanation for a deviation from longstanding agency policy; such regulations are arbitrary and capricious.
Utah v. Strieff	579 U.S. 232	June 20, 2016
The evidence seized incident to arrest is admissible. The officer's discovery of a valid, pre-existing, and untainted arrest warrant attenuated the connection between the unconstitutional investigatory stop and the evidence seized incident to a lawful arrest.
Cuozzo Speed Technologies, LLC v. Lee	579 U.S. 261	June 20, 2016
The Patent Office's inter partes review process is constitutional.
Taylor v. United States	579 U.S. 301	June 20, 2016
In a federal criminal prosecution under the Hobbs Act, the government is not required to prove an interstate commerce element beyond a reasonable doubt.
RJR Nabisco, Inc. v. European Community	579 U.S. 325	June 20, 2016
A violation of 18 U.S.C. § 1962 of the Racketeer Influenced and Corrupt Organizations Act may be based on a pattern of racketeering that includes predicate offenses committed abroad, provided that each of those offenses violates a predicate statute that is itself extraterritorial. However, a private RICO plaintiff must allege and prove a domestic injury.
Fisher v. Univ. of Texas	579 U.S. 365	June 23, 2016
The race-conscious admissions program in use at the time of petitioner's application is lawful under the Equal Protection Clause. The judgement of the Fifth Circuit is affirmed.
Birchfield v. North Dakota	579 U.S. 438	June 23, 2016
1. The Fourth Amendment permits warrantless breath tests incident to arrests for drunk driving but not warrantless blood tests. 2. Motorists who refuse to submit to a blood test may face civil but not criminal penalties.
Mathis v. United States	579 U.S. 500	June 23, 2016
If a state law defines a crime more broadly than the common understanding of that crime, a conviction under that state law cannot be used as a sentencing enhancement under the federal Armed Career Criminal Act.
Dollar General Corp. v. Mississippi Band of Choctaw Indians	579 U.S. 545	June 23, 2016
Affirmed by an equally divided Court.
United States v. Texas	579 U.S. 547	June 23, 2016
Affirmed by an equally divided court.
McDonnell v. United States	579 U.S. 550	June 27, 2016
An "official act" within the federal bribery statutes does not include merely setting up a meeting, calling another public official, or hosting an event.
Whole Woman's Health v. Hellerstedt	579 U.S. 582	June 27, 2016
Both the admitting-privileges and the surgical-center requirements place a substantial obstacle in the path of women seeking a pre-viability abortion, constitute an undue burden on abortion access, and thus violate the Constitution.
Voisine v. United States	579 U.S. 686	June 27, 2016
Reckless misdemeanor domestic violence convictions trigger gun control prohibitions on gun ownership.
