= Puerto Rico v. Franklin California Tax-Free Trust =

- Supreme Court of the United States

Decided June 13, 2016
- Full case name: Puerto Rico v. Franklin California Tax-Free Trust
- Docket no.: 15-233
- Citations: 579 U.S. 115 (more)

Holding
- Chapters 9 and 11 of the Federal Bankruptcy Code preempt the corresponding sections of the Puerto Rico Public Corporation Debt Enforcement and Recovery Act because states may not enact municipal bankruptcy laws, and the territory Puerto Rico is usually included in the definition of a "state" within the Federal Bankruptcy Code.

Court membership
- Chief Justice John Roberts Associate Justices Anthony Kennedy · Clarence Thomas; Ruth Bader Ginsburg · Stephen Breyer; Samuel Alito · Sonia Sotomayor; Elena Kagan

Case opinions
- Majority: Thomas
- Dissent: Sotomayor, joined by Ginsburg
- Alito took no part in the consideration or decision of the case.

Puerto Rico v. Franklin California Tax-Free Trust, 579 U.S. 115 (2016), was a United States Supreme Court case in which the court held that Chapters 9 and 11 of the Federal Bankruptcy Code preempt the corresponding sections of the Puerto Rico Public Corporation Debt Enforcement and Recovery Act because states may not enact municipal bankruptcy laws, and the territory Puerto Rico is usually included in the definition of a "state" within the Federal Bankruptcy Code.

== Background ==
In response to an ongoing fiscal crisis, Puerto Rico enacted the Puerto Rico Public Corporation Debt Enforcement and Recovery Act. Portions of the Recovery Act mirror Chapters 9 and 11 of the Federal Bankruptcy Code and enable Puerto Rico's public utility corporations to restructure their climbing debt. A group of investment funds and utility bondholders, including Franklin California Tax-Free Trust, sought to enjoin the act. They contended, among other things, that a Bankruptcy Code provision at 11 U. S. C. §903(1) explicitly preempts the Recovery Act. The federal district court enjoined the act's enforcement, and the First Circuit Court of Appeals affirmed. Those courts pointed to the fact that the Bankruptcy Code's definition of "State" at §101(52) generally includes Puerto Rico. The exception that says Puerto Rico is not a state for purposes of defining who may be a debtor under Chapter 9, according to the courts, did not remove Puerto Rico from the scope of the preemption provision.

== Opinion of the court ==
The Supreme Court issued an opinion on June 13, 2016.
