= List of United States Supreme Court cases, volume 578 =

This is a list of all the United States Supreme Court cases from volume 578 of the United States Reports:

Case name	Docket no.	Date decided
Friedrichs v. Cal. Teachers Ass'n	578 U.S. 1	March 29, 2016
The judgment was affirmed by an equally-divided court.
Luis v. United States	578 U.S. 5	March 30, 2016
Pre-trial restraint of untainted assets needed to retain a counsel of the defendant's choice violates the Sixth Amendment. The judgment of the Court of Appeals for the Eleventh Circuit vacated and remanded.
Evenwel v. Abbott	578 U.S. 54	April 4, 2016
A state may draw its legislative districts based on total population.
Nichols v. United States	578 U.S. 104	April 4, 2016
The Sex Offender Registration and Notification Act does not require an individual to update his registration once departing a state.
Woods v. Etherton	578 U.S. 113	April 4, 2016
It is not a violation of the Confrontation Clause or the hearsay rules of evidence for the prosecution in a criminal trial to introduce information provided by an anonymous informant if the information is not admitted as evidence to prove the truth of the matter asserted and the judge provides a limiting instruction informing the jury of this. A defense attorney's failure to challenge such statements on hearsay grounds is not ineffective assistance of counsel.
Welch v. United States	578 U.S. 120	April 18, 2016
Johnson v. United States announced a substantive rule change and is thus retroactive.
Hughes v. Talen Energy Marketing, LLC	578 U.S. 150	April 19, 2016
State regulation of the energy market is preempted if it conflicts with requirements set by the Federal Energy Regulatory Commission, including rates.
Franchise Tax Bd. v. Hyatt (2016)	578 U.S. 171	April 19, 2016
The Nevada rule not extending the same immunities to agencies of other states as it does to its own is a "policy of hostility" and unconstitutional under the Full Faith and Credit Clause.
Molina-Martinez v. United States	578 U.S. 189	April 20, 2016
Courts may not have rigid requirements for additional evidence in proceedings to remedy incorrect sentencing guidelines.
Bank Markazi v. Peterson	578 U.S. 212	April 20, 2016
A law that only applied to a specific case, identified by docket number, and eliminated all of the defenses one party had raised did not violate the separation of powers in the United States Constitution between the legislative (Congress) and judicial branches of government; since it pertained to the immunity of assets of a foreign state, it was also justified as a valid exercise of Congress' authority in foreign policy matters.
Harris v. Ariz. Independent Redistricting Comm'n	578 U.S. 253	April 20, 2016
Population deviations for legislative districts predominantly reflected commission's good-faith efforts to comply with Voting Rights Act and obtain preclearance from Department of Justice.
Heffernan v. City of Paterson	578 U.S. 266	April 26, 2016
Police department's demotion of detective in response to mistaken belief he was supporting a challenger to the city's mayor in election violated his First Amendment rights regardless of his actual purpose. Third Circuit reversed and remanded.
Ocasio v. United States	578 U.S. 282	May 2, 2016
A defendant may be charged with conspiracy to commit extortion even though the ones being extorted are part of the extortion scheme.
Sheriff v. Gillie	578 U.S. 317	May 16, 2016
The use of the Ohio Attorney General's letterhead, as its direction, was permissible and not a false, deceptive, or misleading representation under the Fair Debt Collection Practices Act.
Spokeo, Inc. v. Robins	578 U.S. 330	May 16, 2016
Because the Ninth Circuit failed to consider both the concrete and particularized aspects of the injury-in-fact requirement, its Article III standing analysis was incomplete.
Husky Int'l Electronics, Inc. v. Ritz	578 U.S. 355	May 16, 2016
The term "actual fraud" in the discharge exceptions of Chapter 7 of the Bankruptcy Code encompasses fraudulent conveyance schemes even when those schemes do not involve a false representation.
Merrill Lynch, Pierce, Fenner & Smith Inc. v. Manning	578 U.S. 374	May 16, 2016
Section 27 of the Securities Exchange Act of 1934 allows state courts to handle claims filed under their own investor-protection laws even if the litigation might involve some issues under federal securities law.
Zubik v. Burwell	578 U.S. 403	May 16, 2016
Remanded the cases to lower courts for reconsideration in light of the positions asserted by the parties in their supplemental briefs.
Kernan v. Hinojosa	578 U.S. 412	May 16, 2016
The lower court misapplied the test in Ylst v. Nunnemaker that states that if a state court order denies a habeas petition without explanation, it is presumed that the order agrees with the "last reasoned state court opinion" in the case unless there is "strong evidence" to the contrary.
CRST Van Expedited, Inc. v. EEOC	578 U.S. 419	May 19, 2016
A defendant need not succeed on the merits in order to be the prevailing party for the purposes of seeking attorney fees.
Betterman v. Montana	578 U.S. 437	May 19, 2016
The Sixth Amendment's speedy trial guarantee does not apply once a defendant has been found guilty at trial or has pleaded guilty to criminal charges.
Luna Torres v. Lynch	578 U.S. 452	May 19, 2016
Section 1101(a)(43) of the federal Immigration and Nationality Act, which includes "aggravated felony" as a possible reason for deporting a non-citizen, can include state offenses, if all of the elements of the federal crime are met, with the exception of the interstate or foreign commerce requirement.
Foster v. Chatman	578 U.S. 488	May 23, 2016
The Court has jurisdiction to review the judgment of the Georgia Supreme Court denying Foster a Certificate of Probable Cause on his Batson claim. The decision that Foster failed to show purposeful discrimination was clearly erroneous under the three-step process established by Batson v. Kentucky.
Wittman v. Personhuballah	578 U.S. 539	May 23, 2016
The appellants lacked standing under Article III of the United States Constitution to pursue their appeal.
Green v. Brennan	578 U.S. 547	May 23, 2016
When filing a workplace discrimination complaint under Title VII of the Civil Rights Act of 1964, the filing period begins only after an employee resigns. The filing period begins at the time that the employee gives notice of resignation, not the effective date of resignation.
Army Corps of Engineers v. Hawkes Co.	578 U.S. 590	May 31, 2016
A Clean Water Act jurisdictional determination issued by the United States Army Corps of Engineers is reviewable under the Administrative Procedure Act because jurisdictional determinations constitute final agency action.
Johnson v. Lee	578 U.S. 605	May 31, 2016
The Ninth Circuit previously held that California's "Dixon Bar" (which states that a defendant procedurally defaults a claim raised for the first time on state collateral review if he could have raised it earlier on direct appeal) is inadequate to bar federal habeas review. The Court reversed the Ninth Circuit on grounds that this procedural bar "is longstanding, oft-cited, and shared by habeas courts across the nation".
Lynch v. Arizona	578 U.S. 613	May 31, 2016
The Arizona court misapplied the test in Simmons v. South Carolina (1994), which states "where a capital defendant's future dangerousness is at issue, and the only sentencing alternative to death available to the jury is life imprisonment without possibility of parole," the Due Process Clause entitles the defendant 'to inform the jury of [his] parole ineligibility, either by a jury instruction or in arguments by counsel.'"
Simmons v. Himmelreich	578 U.S. 621	June 6, 2016
State officials may still be liable for conduct that the state is immune to under exceptions within the Federal Tort Claims Act.
Ross v. Blake	578 U.S. 632	June 6, 2016
The Prison Litigation Reform Act’s requirement to exhaust administrative remedies does not have a "special circumstances" exception, but inmates are only required to exhaust administrative remedies that are genuinely available to them.
