= Susan Tolchin =

American political scientist

- Tolchin (c. 2012)
- Born: Susan Jane Goldsmith; January 14, 1941; New York City, New York, U.S.
- Died: May 18, 2016 (aged 75); Washington, D.C., U.S.
- Spouse: Martin Tolchin (m. 1965)
- Children: 2

Academic background
- Education: Bryn Mawr College; University of Chicago; New York University

Academic work
- Discipline: Political scientist
- Institutions: Mount Vernon College for Women; George Mason University

Susan Jane Tolchin (January 14, 1941 – May 18, 2016) was an American political scientist.

== Life ==
Susan Jane Goldsmith was born in Manhattan to Jacob Goldsmith, a lawyer, and his wife Dorothy (née Markowitz), a teacher. She graduated from Bryn Mawr College, the University of Chicago and New York University. She taught at Mount Vernon College, at The George Washington University during the early 1990s, and George Mason University.

She married journalist Martin Tolchin, a founder of Politico, in 1965, coauthored many books on American politics and remained married until her death. They had two children; Charles (d. 2003) and Karen. She died of ovarian cancer at her home in Washington on May 18, 2016, at the age of 75.

== Works ==
- Martin Tolchin; Susan J. Tolchin (December 22, 2015). Pinstripe Patronage. Taylor & Francis. ISBN 978-1-317-25418-8.
- Susan J. Tolchin (1999). The Angry American: How Voter Rage is Changing the Nation. Westview Press. ISBN 978-0-8133-6754-5.
- Martin Tolchin; Susan J. Tolchin (1976). Clout: Womanpower and Politics. Putnam. ISBN 9780698106000.
- Martin Tolchin; Susan J. Tolchin (1971). To The Victor.... Random House. ISBN 9780394460369.
