= Luna Torres v. Lynch =

- Supreme Court of the United States

Argued November 3, 2015 Decided May 19, 2016
- Full case name: Jorge Luna Torres, Petitioner v. Loretta E. Lynch, Attorney General
- Docket no.: 14–1096
- Citations: 578 U.S. 452 (more) 136 S. Ct. 1619; 194 L. Ed. 2d 737
- Opinion announcement: Opinion announcement

Holding
- Section 1101(a)(43) of the federal Immigration and Nationality Act, which includes "aggravated felony" as a possible reason for deporting a non-citizen, can include state offenses, if all of the elements of the federal crime are met, with the exception of the interstate or foreign commerce requirement.

Court membership
- Chief Justice John Roberts Associate Justices Anthony Kennedy · Clarence Thomas; Ruth Bader Ginsburg · Stephen Breyer; Samuel Alito · Sonia Sotomayor; Elena Kagan

Case opinions
- Majority: Kagan, joined by Roberts, Kennedy, Ginsburg, Alito
- Dissent: Sotomayor, joined by Thomas, Breyer

Laws applied
- Immigration and Nationality Act of 1952; Immigration and Nationality Technical Corrections Act of 1994; Illegal Immigration Reform and Immigrant Responsibility Act of 1996

Luna Torres v. Lynch, 578 U.S. 452 (2016), was a United States Supreme Court case in which the Court decided the interpretation of section 1101(a)(43) of the federal Immigration and Nationality Act (INA), which includes "aggravated felony" as a possible reason for deporting a non-citizen. The INA specifies certain offenses described in the federal criminal code as qualifying as an aggravated felony. The question before the court was if the plaintiff Jorge Luna Torres, who had been convicted under a state arson statute mostly identical to the federal statute but lacking an interstate or foreign commerce element in the federal law, fell under this definition of aggravated felony. The Court affirmed the U.S. Court of Appeals for the Second Circuit original decision: the difference was merely "jurisdictional", and Torres still qualified for the accelerated deportation process described under the INA.

== Background ==
George Luna Torres ("Torres"), a green card holder (lawful permanent resident) of the United States since childhood and a citizen of the Dominican Republic, was convicted in 1999 of "attempted arson" (arson in the third degree) under section 150.10 of the New York Penal Law. Torres was sentenced to one day of imprisonment after his guilty plea.

Seven years later, in 2006, the U.S. Immigration and Customs Enforcement (ICE) placed Torres in removal proceedings. The Immigration and Nationality Act (INA) lists about 80 federal offenses as qualifying for "aggravated felony" status, and ICE charged that Torres' 1999 conviction is described by 18 U.S.C. § 844(i), a federal arson statute and one of the statues listed by the INA. The Immigration Judge found Torres removable from the United States as charged, which the Board of Immigration Appeals (BIA) affirmed. Torres filed a petition for review with the Second Circuit. Under the Chevron doctrine, the Second Circuit, in an eight paragraph opinion, deferred to the BIA's judgment reasoning, stating that they did not have jurisdiction to investigate the BIA's finding, which was at least facially reasonable. Torres appealed to the Supreme Court.

== Opinion of the Court ==
Associate Justice Elena Kagan authored a 5–3 decision affirming the Second Circuit. The opinion cited section 1101(a)(43)'s penultimate sentence, which says "The term [aggravated felony] applies to an offense described in this paragraph whether in violation of Federal or State law...". Justice Kagan wrote that "the whole point of § 1101(a)(43)'s penultimate sentence is to make clear that a listed [conviction] should lead to swift removal, no matter whether [the listed offense] violates federal, state, or foreign law." Kagan wrote that the state arson law not including the interstate commerce restriction was a "jurisdictional element" that was not relevant to the applicability of the INA, which intended to also punish violations of state law, and such a difference was only a minor disparity.

Justice Sonia Sotomayor wrote a dissenting opinion, with whom Thomas and Breyer joined. The dissent argued that Congress had intended for federal crimes to be treated as more serious than state crimes by the plain language of the INA. The federal arson statute required that the act be "used in interstate or foreign commerce", and this standard was not met in Torres's case.
