= Sheriff v. Gillie =

- Supreme Court of the United States

Argued March 29, 2016 Decided May 16, 2016
- Full case name: Mark J. Sheriff, et al., Petitioners v. Pamela Gillie, et al.
- Docket no.: 15-338
- Citations: 578 U.S. 317 (more) 136 S. Ct. 1594; 194 L. Ed. 2d 625
- Opinion announcement: Opinion announcement

Holding
- The use of the Ohio Attorney General's letterhead, as its direction, was permissible and not a false, deceptive, or misleading representation under the Fair Debt Collection Practices Act.

Court membership
- Chief Justice John Roberts Associate Justices Anthony Kennedy · Clarence Thomas; Ruth Bader Ginsburg · Stephen Breyer; Samuel Alito · Sonia Sotomayor; Elena Kagan

Case opinion
- Majority: Ginsburg, joined by unanimous

Laws applied
- Fair Debt Collection Practices Act

Sheriff v. Gillie, 578 U.S. 317 (2016), was a United States Supreme Court case in which the Court held that the use of the Ohio Attorney General's letterhead, as its direction, was permissible and not a false, deceptive, or misleading representation under the Fair Debt Collection Practices Act.

== Background ==
The Ohio Attorney General contracted out debt collection to private attorneys and instructed them to use the Ohio Attorney General's letterhead.

== Opinion of the Court ==
Associate Justice Ruth Bader Ginsburg authored a unanimous decision.
