= Wittman v. Personhuballah =

- Supreme Court of the United States

Argued March 21, 2016 Decided May 23, 2016
- Full case name: Robert J. Wittman, et al., Appellants v. Gloria Personhuballah, et al.
- Docket no.: 14-1504
- Citations: 578 U.S. 539 (more) 136 S. Ct. 1732; 195 L. Ed. 2d 37
- Opinion announcement: Opinion announcement

Court membership
- Chief Justice John Roberts Associate Justices Anthony Kennedy · Clarence Thomas; Ruth Bader Ginsburg · Stephen Breyer; Samuel Alito · Sonia Sotomayor; Elena Kagan

Case opinion
- Majority: Breyer, joined by unanimous

Wittman v. Personhuballah, 578 U.S. 539 (2016), was a United States Supreme Court case in which the Court held that the appellants lacked standing under Article III of the United States Constitution to pursue their appeal. The case dealt with redistricting by the Virginia Legislature of Virginia's 3rd congressional district and allegations of gerrymandering based upon race. The appeal was brought by Congressmen David Brat, Randy Forbes, and Rob Wittman.
