= Elrod v. Burns =

- Supreme Court of the United States

Argued April 19, 1976 Decided June 28, 1976
- Full case name: Elrod, Sheriff, et al. v. Burns, et al.
- Citations: 427 U.S. 347 (more) 96 S. Ct. 2673; 49 L. Ed. 2d 547

Case history
- Prior: Burns v. Elrod, 509 F.2d 1133 (7th Cir. 1975); cert. granted, 423 U.S. 821 (1975).

Holding
- Firing decisions involving non-policymaking public employees may not be constitutionally based on party affiliation and support pursuant to the First Amendment of the United States Constitution.

Court membership
- Chief Justice Warren E. Burger Associate Justices William J. Brennan Jr. · Potter Stewart; Byron White · Thurgood Marshall; Harry Blackmun · Lewis F. Powell Jr. William Rehnquist · John P. Stevens

Case opinions
- Plurality: Brennan, joined by White, Marshall
- Concurrence: Stewart, joined by Blackmun
- Dissent: Burger
- Dissent: Powell, joined by Burger, Rehnquist
- Stevens took no part in the consideration or decision of the case.

Laws applied
- U.S. Const. amend. I

Elrod v. Burns, 427 U.S. 347 (1976), is a United States Supreme Court decision regarding political speech of public employees. The Court ruled in this case that public employees may be active members in a political party, but cannot allow patronage to be a deciding factor in work related decisions. The court upheld the decision by the 7th Circuit Court of Appeals ruling in favor of the respondent.

== Background ==
Richard J. Elrod was elected Cook County, Ill. Sheriff. As a Democrat, he dismissed four non-civil service employees. John Burns and the other dismissed employees claimed it was on the grounds that they were members of the Republican Party. The previous sheriff, a Republican, had hired them all. Burns and other former employees claimed discrimination due to their affiliation, or lack of affiliation, to a particular political party. The Cook County Sheriff's Office had a tradition of operating under the partisan spoils system.

== Constitutional Question ==
The constitutional question is if the firing of Burns and the other respondents was in violation of the Hatch Act and within the jurisdiction of First Amendment accepted free speech by a public employee. The court was deciding whether these statutes should apply to public, non-federal employees.

== Decision ==
Justice Brennan wrote the decision affirming the 7th Circuit Court decision. The Court held that patronage dismissals of public employees violated the First Amendment and distinguished between policymaking officials and employees with more limited responsibilities. The decision recognized that different types of executive officials may warrant different treatment based on their functions.

“Patronage dismissals severely restrict political belief and association, which constitute the core of those activities protected by the First Amendment, and government may not, without seriously inhibiting First Amendment rights, force a public employee to relinquish his right to political association as the price of holding a public job” – Justice Brennan

Justice Stewart wrote a concurring decision, highlighting that non-policymaking officials cannot be fired on the basis of political affiliation or belief.

The decision upheld the belief that the ‘spoils system’ is unconstitutional through first amendment freedoms. The Supreme Court protected the rights of employees by giving further allowance of free speech by public employees. The decision deemed that the firing of non-policymaking, public employees was unconstitutional, it did not touch on the topic of hiring or promotion.

The decision built off Keyishian v. Board of Regents (1967) that deemed it illegal for public employees to be fired for being members of the Communist Party.

== Dissent ==
Justice Powell wrote a dissent claiming that half of the employees in the Cook County, Ill. Sheriff's Office are merit based and are protected from being fired by a new administration. The other half of employees, which Burns was a part of, were hired based on principles decided by the previous sheriff, a Republican. The non-merit employees were hired on basis of patronage and they should be able to be fired on the basis of patronage. The dissent claims that partisan politics at the state level are necessary for the political system to evolve.

“The Court holds unconstitutional a practice as old as the Republic, a practice which has contributed significantly to the democratization of American politics.” – Justice Powell

Justice Powell goes on to cite the removal of political opponents from roles by founding fathers, such as John Adams, Thomas Jefferson and their successors.

== The Hatch Act ==
Congress passed the Hatch Act, or the Act to Prevent Pernicious Political Activities, in 1939. It prevents many federal employees from participating in certain partisan activities. Specifically, it prohibits campaign activities by federal employees. In an earlier Supreme Court ruling Justices Marshall and Brennan signed on to an opinion in 1973 stating.

"It is no concern of government what an employee does in his or her spare time, whether religion, recreation, social work or politics is his hobby, unless what he or she does impairs efficiency or other facets of the merits of his job." – Mr. Justice Douglas

The court had deemed this as a balance between not restricting speech and making sure that public employees do not over step the boundaries of the office due to political affiliation. The 14th Amendment states that all constitutional rights and laws are to be enforced at the state level.

== Subsequent Cases ==
In Rutan v. Republican Party of Illinois (1990), the state of Illinois put a hiring freeze on public employees without permission from the governor. The new employees being hired were all members of the Republican Party. The court decided in favor of the petitioner adding the Elrod v. Burns ruling that nonpolicymaking government employees cannot be hired based on political patronage.

Heffernan v. City of Paterson (2016) was a similar case that took into consideration partisan acts but a member of the Paterson, NJ police force. Jeffery Heffernan was seen carrying a campaign sign to a sick parent. As a result of being seen with the sign, he was demoted for public engagement of political activities. The court overturned that decision claiming that he was acting under protected speech.

Following the Elrod v. Burns decision, the court has stayed with the sentiment that the free speech rights of government employees is protected when they are in non-policymaking or traditionally partisan roles.

== See also ==
- List of United States Supreme Court cases involving the First Amendment
- List of United States Supreme Court cases, volume 427
- Branti v. Finkel
