= CRST Van Expedited, Inc. v. EEOC =

- Supreme Court of the United States

Argued March 28, 2016 Decided May 19, 2016
- Full case name: CRST Van Expedited, Inc., Petitioner v. Equal Employment Opportunity Commission
- Docket no.: 14-1375
- Citations: 578 U.S. 419 (more) 136 S. Ct. 1642; 194 L. Ed. 2d 707

Holding
- A defendant need not succeed on the merits in order to be the prevailing party for the purposes of seeking attorney fees.

Court membership
- Chief Justice John Roberts Associate Justices Anthony Kennedy · Clarence Thomas; Ruth Bader Ginsburg · Stephen Breyer; Samuel Alito · Sonia Sotomayor; Elena Kagan

Case opinions
- Majority: Kennedy, joined by unanimous
- Concurrence: Thomas

CRST Van Expedited, Inc. v. Equal Employment Opportunity Commission, 578 U.S. 419 (2016), was a United States Supreme Court case regarding whether a prevailing party must succeed on the merits to seek attorney's fees. In a unanimous decision authored by Associate Justice Anthony Kennedy, the Court held that a defendant need not succeed on the merits in order to be the prevailing party for the purposes of seeking attorney fees.

Following the Supreme Court's decision in CRST's favor, the matter was remanded to the Eighth Circuit Court of Appeals and back to the United States District Court for the Northern District of Iowa for further proceedings. In December 2017, the District Court ordered the EEOC to pay CRST $3,317,289.67 in attorney fees.^{,} The EEOC appealed this order to the Eighth Circuit. The Eighth Circuit affirmed the fee award to CRST, which the EEOC paid in 2020.
