= Ross v. Blake =

- Supreme Court of the United States

Argued March 29, 2016 Decided June 6, 2016
- Full case name: Michael Ross, Petitioner v. Shaidon Blake
- Docket no.: 15-339
- Citations: 578 U.S. 632 (more) 136 S. Ct. 1850; 195 L. Ed. 2d 117
- Argument: Oral argument
- Opinion announcement: Opinion announcement

Case history
- Prior: Blake v. Ross, 787 F.3d 693 (4th Cir. 2015); cert. granted, 136 S. Ct. 614 (2015).

Holding
- The Prison Litigation Reform Act’s requirement to exhaust administrative remedies does not have a “special circumstances” exception, but inmates are only required to exhaust administrative remedies that are genuinely available to them.

Court membership
- Chief Justice John Roberts Associate Justices Anthony Kennedy · Clarence Thomas; Ruth Bader Ginsburg · Stephen Breyer; Samuel Alito · Sonia Sotomayor; Elena Kagan

Case opinions
- Majority: Kagan, joined by Roberts, Kennedy, Ginsburg, Alito, Sotomayor
- Concurrence: Thomas (in part)
- Concurrence: Breyer (in part)

Laws applied
- Prison Litigation Reform Act of 1995

Ross v. Blake, 578 U.S. 632 (2016), was a United States Supreme Court case in which the Court held that "special circumstances" cannot excuse an inmate's failure to exhaust administrative remedies before filing a lawsuit under the Prison Litigation Reform Act of 1995, but clarified that inmates are required to exhaust only administrative remedies that are genuinely available. In so doing, it vacated and remanded the decision of the United States Court of Appeals for the Fourth Circuit.

== Facts and Procedural History ==
In 2007, Shaidon Blake, an inmate in a Maryland prison, was assaulted by guards James Madigan and Michael Ross while being moved from his regular cell to the segregation unit. Blake reported the incident to a senior corrections officer who referred it to the Maryland prison system's Internal Investigative Unit (IIU), which investigates employee misconduct. The IIU investigated for a year, and then issued a report that condemned Madigan but made no findings regarding Ross. Madigan then resigned.

After the IIU issued its report, Blake sued Madigan and Ross under 42 U.S.C. § 1983; he claimed that Madigan used excessive force and Ross failed to take protective action. A jury awarded Blake $50,000 as to his claim against Madigan.

Ross presented an affirmative defense: Blake had sued without first exhausting the prison's Administrative Remedy Procedure (ARP) process, and thus was barred from court under the PLRA. The PLRA, 42 U.S.C. § 1997e(a) provides that “No action shall be brought with respect to prison conditions under section 1983 of this title, or any other Federal law, by a prisoner confined in any jail, prison, or other correctional facility until such administrative remedies as are available are exhausted.” Blake conceded that he had not submitted a formal grievance through the ARP, "because, he thought, the IIU investigation served as a substitute for that otherwise standard process."

=== District Court Decision ===
Judge Alexander Williams, Jr. of the United States District Court for the District of Maryland dismissed the case, reasoning that "the commencement of an internal investigation does not relieve prisoners from the [PLRA's] exhaustion requirement."

=== Court of Appeals Decision ===
The United States Court of Appeals for the Fourth Circuit reversed. It explained that the PLRA's "exhaustion requirement is not absolute." Rather, there are certain "special circumstances" that can justify an inmate's failure to exhaust available administrative remedies. One such circumstance, the Fourth Circuit panel held, was when an inmate failed to exhaust because he reasonably believed that he had already exhausted and no additional remedies were available. And here, the court held that Blake was entitled to the "special circumstances" exception because he thought the IIU investigation precluded him from pursuing remedies through the regular ARP process. Judge G. Steven Agee dissented, holding that judge-made exceptions to the PLRA's Congressionally-mandated exhaustion requirement were impermissible.

== Decision of the Court ==
Associate Justice Elena Kagan authored the majority opinion. The Supreme Court vacated the judgment of the Fourth Circuit and remanded for the lower court to determine whether the ARP process was, in fact, "available" to Blake.

The Court criticized the Fourth Circuit for making "no attempt to ground its analysis in the PLRA’s language." It agreed with Blake's characterization of the Fourth Circuit's rule as an “extra-textual exception to the PLRA’s exhaustion requirement.” The PLRA's text, it held, “suggests no limits on an inmate’s obligation to exhaust – irrespective of any ‘special circumstances.’” While the Court acknowledged that judges can craft exceptions to judge-made exhaustion requirements, it emphasized that statutory exhaustion requirements are different, and only Congress can create exceptions. In this case, it explained, both Supreme Court precedent and the broader history of the PLRA supported the conclusion that Congress intended the exhaustion requirement to be mandatory.

The Court noted, however, that its rejection of the “special circumstances” exception did not decide the case, because “the PLRA contains its own, textual exception to mandatory exhaustion.” Inmates are required to exhaust only “such administrative remedies as are available.” In other words, inmates must only exhaust remedies that are capable of use to obtain some relief. The Court then outlined three situations in which an administrative remedy may be official policy, but yet is “not capable of use to obtain relief.” First, a remedy is unavailable when officers are consistently unable or unwilling to give inmates any sort of relief. Second, a remedy is unavailable if it is “so opaque” that “no ordinary prisoner can discern or navigate it.” Third, a remedy is unavailable if administrators “thwart inmates from taking advantage of a grievance process through machination, misrepresentation, or intimidation.”

In this case, the Court noted, the facts suggested it was possible (but not certain) that the ARP was not “available” for Blake to exhaust. While Maryland's Inmate Handbook provided that prisoners could use the ARP for all kinds of grievances, Blake maintained that “once the IIU commences such an inquiry, a prisoner cannot obtain relief through the standard ARP process – whatever the Handbook may say to the contrary.” Because the materials the Court had seen concerning the operation of the IIU and ARP processes were “not conclusive,” it remanded for the lower courts to “perform a thorough review of such materials, and then address the legal issues [the Court] has highlighted concerning the availability of administrative remedies.”

=== Concurrence of Justice Thomas ===
Justice Thomas concurred in part and in the judgment. He joined the Court's opinion, except for its discussion of the interaction of the ARP and IIU systems, which involved consideration of documents lodged with the Supreme Court, but never previously raised in the lower courts. Justice Thomas opined that “[t]aking notice of the documents encourages gamesmanship and frustrates our review.”

=== Concurrence of Justice Breyer ===
Justice Breyer concurred in part. Echoing his concurrence in Woodford v. Ngo, he wrote that the PLRA exhaustion requirement is subject to administrative law's “well-established exceptions” to exhaustion. While these do not include a “special circumstances” exception, other non-textual exceptions may apply.

== Implications ==
Ross v. Blake has been cited in nearly 2,000 cases as of March 2019. While it is sometimes described as limiting access to courts for prisoners by abrogating the “special circumstances” exception, it is also often characterized as expanding prisoner recourse by clarifying that, in certain circumstances, administrative remedies may be on the books but yet practically “unavailable.” Though Ross has been discussed extensively by courts, it has received limited attention from scholars and news outlets.

=== Selected Supreme Court and Federal Courts of Appeals Cases ===
- Fry v. Napoleon Cmty. Sch., 137 S. Ct. 743, 753 (2017) (citing Ross for the proposition that administrative relief is only available when it is "accessible or may be obtained," and applying this principle in the context of the Individuals with Disabilities Education Act).
- Williams v. Corr. Officer Priatno, 829 F.3d 118, 121 (2d Cir. 2016) (finding a prison grievance process unavailable in light of Ross, which "clarified the framework under which courts should assess whether a prisoner has complied with the PLRA exhaustion requirement").
- Rinaldi v. United States, 904 F.3d 257, 267-70 (3d Cir. 2018) (applying Ross and holding that intimidation by prison officials thwarted appellant from using the grievance process, rendering it unavailable to him).
- Ramirez v. Young, 906 F.3d 530, 538 (7th Cir. 2018) (holding that Ross’s three examples of when administrative remedies are unavailable were “not a closed list” and finding unavailability where the prison did not take reasonable steps to inform the inmate about his remedies).
- Townsend v. Murphy, 898 F.3d 780, 783-84 (8th Cir. 2018) (applying Ross and finding a formal grievance procedure unavailable where an inmate was denied access to the prison library that contained the only copy of the administrative directive).
- Fuqua v. Ryan, 890 F.3d 838, 849-50 (9th Cir. 2018) (concluding that a particular prison administrative remedy was so opaque as to be functionally unavailable based on the reasoning in Ross).

=== Selected Scholarship ===
- Jacqueline Hayley Summs, Comment, Grappling with Inmates' Access to Justice: The Narrowing of the Exhaustion Requirement in Ross v. Blake, 69 ADMIN. L. REV. 467 (2017) (arguing that while “the immediate effect” of Ross may be “to create more obstacles” for inmates, “the larger significance of the case lies in the Court's decision to provide specific language to the PLRA's textual exception).
- Nicola A. Cohen, Note, Why Ross v. Blake Opens a Door to Federal Courts for Incarcerated Adolescents, 51 COLUM. J.L. & SOC. PROBS. 177 (2017) (arguing that adolescents incarcerated in adult facilities face increased difficulty comprehending grievance processes, which should excuse their failure to exhaust in light of Ross).

=== Selected Treatises and Manuals ===
- 4 ADMINISTRATIVE LAW AND PRACTICE § 12:21 (3d ed., February 2019)
- 15 AMERICAN JURISPRUDENCE CIVIL RIGHTS § 124 (2d ed., February 2019)
- Prison Litigation Reform Act (PLRA): Procedural Basics, PRACTICAL LAW PRACTICE NOTE w-015-8501
- 14A CORPUS JURIS SECUNDUM CIVIL RIGHTS § 350 (March 2019 update)

=== Selected News Articles and Blog Posts ===
- Celeste Valencia & Charles C. Dike, Prison Litigation Reform Act: Congressional Statute Not Open to Judicial Discretion, 45 J. AM. ACAD. PSYCHIATRY L. ONLINE 116 (2017).
- Federalist Society, Ross v. Blake - Post-Decision SCOTUScast (July 28, 2016).
- Prison Legal News, Second Circuit: Ross Abrogates “Special Circumstances” Exhaustion Exception (Oct. 10, 2017).
- Steven D. Schwinn, Constitutional Law Prof. Blog, Mixed Result in State Prisoner-Rights Case (June 6, 2016).

== See also ==
- Prison Litigation Reform Act (PLRA)
- Exhaustion of remedies
- List of United States Supreme Court cases by the Roberts Court
- List of United States Supreme Court cases, volume 578
