= Ocasio v. United States =

- Supreme Court of the United States

Argued October 6, 2015 Decided May 2, 2016
- Full case name: Samuel Ocasio, Petitioner v. United States of America
- Docket no.: 14-361
- Citations: 578 U.S. 282 (more) 136 S. Ct. 1423; 194 L. Ed. 2d 520
- Argument: Oral argument
- Opinion announcement: Opinion announcement

Case history
- Prior: United States v. Ocasio, 750 F.3d 399 (4th Cir. 2014); cert. granted, 135 S. Ct. 1491 (2015).

Holding
- A defendant may be charged with conspiracy to commit extortion even though the ones being extorted are part of the extortion scheme.

Court membership
- Chief Justice John Roberts Associate Justices Anthony Kennedy · Clarence Thomas; Ruth Bader Ginsburg · Stephen Breyer; Samuel Alito · Sonia Sotomayor; Elena Kagan

Case opinions
- Majority: Alito, joined by Kennedy, Ginsburg, Breyer, Kagan
- Concurrence: Breyer
- Dissent: Thomas
- Dissent: Sotomayor, joined by Roberts

Laws applied
- Hobbs Act, 18 U.S.C. §§ 371, 1951.

Ocasio v. United States, 578 U.S. 282 (2016), was a United States Supreme Court case in which the Court clarified whether the Hobbs Act's definition of conspiracy to commit extortion only includes attempts to acquire property from someone who is not a member of the conspiracy. The case arose when Samuel Ocasio, a former Baltimore, Maryland police officer, was indicted for participating in a kickback scheme with an automobile repair shop where officers would refer drivers of damaged vehicles to the shop in exchange for cash payments. Ocasio argued that he should not be found guilty of conspiring to commit extortion because the only property that was exchanged in the scheme was transferred from one member of the conspiracy to another, and an individual cannot be found guilty of conspiring to extort a co-conspirator.

Writing for a majority of the Court, Justice Samuel Alito held that a conspiracy to violate the Hobbs Act can occur when an individual obtains property from another conspirator under the pretense that they have an official right to take that property. Justice Stephen Breyer wrote a separate concurring opinion in which he suggested that the Court may need to revisit prior cases that have held that "extortion" is roughly equivalent to "bribery". Justice Clarence Thomas wrote a dissenting opinion in which he also argued that the Court should overturn a line of cases that has conflated the definition of extortion with bribery, and he also argued that the majority's opinion was inconsistent with principles of federalism. Justice Sonia Sotomayor also wrote a dissenting opinion in which she argued that the majority's opinion was inconsistent with the plain language of the Hobbs Act as well as the Court's prior conspiracy law jurisprudence. Although some commentators have stated that the case is consistent with precedent, at least one commentator has suggested that the case will "raise more questions than answers."

== Background ==
Between 2008 and 2011, at least 60 Baltimore, Maryland police officers engaged in a kickback scheme with an automobile repair shop. When these officers responded to traffic accidents, they would refer motorists to the repair shop in exchange for payments of $150 to $300 for every referral. Samuel Ocasio was a former Baltimore police officer who participated in this scheme between 2009 and 2011. He was charged under the Hobbs Act for extorting money from the automobile repair shop. Before his trial began, Ocasio sought a jury instruction that would have required the jury to find, as a prerequisite for convicting him for conspiracy to commit extortion, that "the government must prove beyond a reasonable doubt that the conspiracy was to obtain money or property from some person who was not a member of the conspiracy". The United States District Court for the District of Maryland ultimately refused to provide Ocasio's proposed instruction and Ocasio was found guilty on one count of conspiracy and three counts of extortion. On appeal to the United States Court of Appeals for the Fourth Circuit, Ocasio argued that "his conspiracy conviction was fatally flawed because the conspirators had not agreed to obtain money from a person who was not a member of the conspiracy", but the Fourth Circuit affirmed his conviction. Ocasio appealed again, and on March 2, 2015, the Supreme Court of the United States granted certiorari.

== Opinion of the Court ==
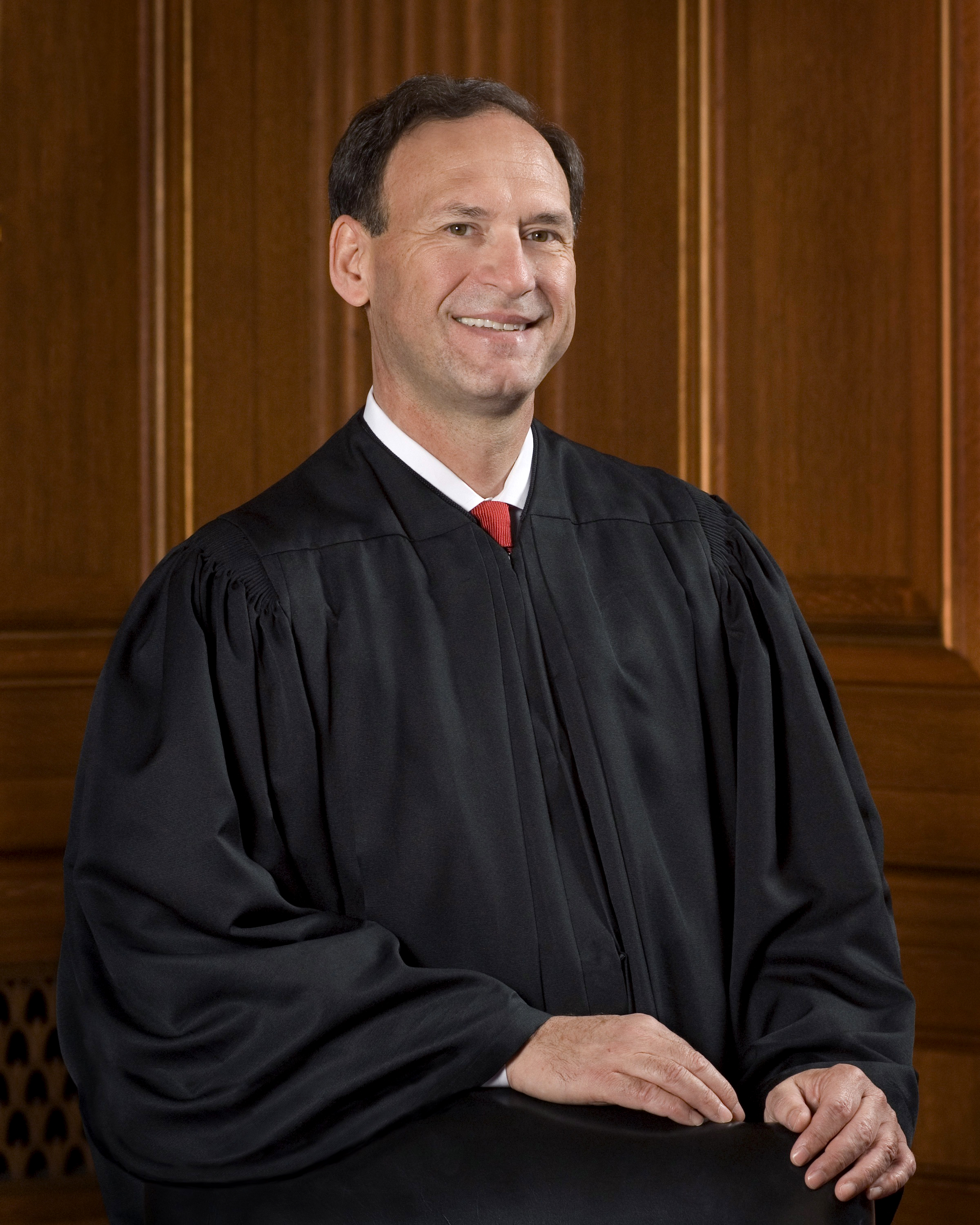
In his majority opinion, Justice Samuel Alito (pictured) held that it was sufficient for the government to demonstrate that at least one member of the conspiracy intended to commit extortion.

Writing for a majority of the Court, Justice Samuel Alito held that to be found guilty of conspiracy, a "defendant must merely reach an agreement with the 'specific intent that the underlying crime be committed' by some member of the conspiracy". He concluded that it was sufficient for the government to demonstrate that each conspirator "specifically intended that some conspirator commit each element of the substantive offense". Additionally, Justice Alito rejected Ocasio's argument that the conspiracy conviction should be reversed because Ocasio and the auto shop were simply exchanging "their own" money; instead, Justice Alito held that the convictions were justified because other Baltimore police officers were involved in the underlying substantive violations.

Justice Alito also rejected Ocasio's argument that the Court's "interpretation makes the Hobbs Act sweep too broadly, creating a national antibribery law and displacing a carefully crafted network of state and federal statutes". In Evans v. United States, the Court had explained that an act of extortion under the Hobbs act was the "rough equivalent" of bribery. Because Ocasio did not ask the court to overrule Evans and because the Court had "no occasion to do so" sua sponte, Justice Alito held that "we have no principled basis for precluding the prosecution of conspiracies to commit" extortion under the Hobbs act. Justice Alito also rejected the argument that the Court's ruling would "transform every bribe of a public official into a conspiracy to commit extortion" because "[i]n cases where the bribe payor is merely complying with an official demand, the payor lacks the mens rea necessary for a conspiracy". Consequently, because Ocasio entered into an agreement to extort money "under color of official right", the Court affirmed Ocasio's conviction.

=== Justice Breyer's concurring opinion ===
Although he "join[ed] the majority's opinion in full", Justice Stephen Breyer wrote a separate concurring opinion to explain that Evans v. United States "may well have been wrongly decided". Justice Breyer wrote that "[t]he present case underscores some of the problems that Evans raises", but he ultimately agreed with the majority's conclusion because "we must in this case take Evans as good law". However, Justice Breyer argued that "it is an exceptionally difficult question" whether the Hobbs Act's definition of extortion was equivalent to bribery.

=== Justice Thomas' dissenting opinion ===
Justice Clarence Thomas wrote a dissenting opinion in which he argued that Ocasio's conviction should be reversed because "an extortionist cannot conspire to commit extortion with the person whom he is extorting". He stated that the majority opinion "further exposes the flaw in this Court's understanding of extortion". Justice Thomas argued that this misunderstanding originated in the Court's prior opinion in Evans v. United States, which, according to Justice Thomas, "wrongly equated extortion with bribery". In Evans, Justice Thomas wrote a dissenting opinion in which he argued that under the Hobbs Act, "the only perpetrator is the public official; the payor is a victim and not a participant". Relying upon this principle, Justice Thomas reiterated that it is not possible for an extortionist and "his payor-victim can be co-conspirators to extortion of the payor". Justice Thomas criticized the majority for taking "another step away from the common-law understanding of extortion that the Hobbs Act adopted", and argued that "[o]nly by blurring the distinction between bribery and extortion could Evans make it seem plausible that an extortionist and a victim can conspire to extort the victim".

Justice Thomas also criticized the majority for expanding federal criminal law in a manner that he argued was inconsistent with the principles of [federalism. He characterized the Hobbs Act as an example of the "stunning expansion" into the area of anti-corruption laws, which he argued were "traditionally policed by state and local laws". Additionally, Justice Thomas stated that the authors of the Hobbs Act did not intend to enable the regulation of state officials by federal prosecutors, and he characterized the expansion of the Hobbs act as an "invasion of state sovereignty". He wrote, "as in Evans, the Court reaches its decision with barely a nod to the sovereignty interests that it tramples". For those reasons, Justice Thomas dissented from the Court's majority opinion.

=== Justice Sotomayor's dissenting opinion ===
Justice Sonia Sotomayor wrote a dissenting opinion in which she was joined by Chief Justice John Roberts. She criticized the majority's conclusion as "not a natural or logical way to interpret" the Hobbs Act's definition of extortion, which requires property to be extorted "from another". Citing dictionary definitions of the word "another" and the Court's prior conspiracy law jurisprudence, Justice Sotomayor argued that an individual should only be found guilty of conspiring to commit extortion when they plan to extort an individual who is not a member of the conspiracy. Likewise, she also distinguished other cases in which criminal defendants were also the "victim[s] of the crime" in those cases. Justice Sotomayor ultimately concluded her opinion by stating that the majority reached "an unnatural outcome predicated on an unsupported assumption".

== Commentary and analysis ==
In his analysis for The George Washington Law Review, Randall Eliason wrote that the Court's decision "doesn't represent some new watershed in white collar crime or dramatic expansion of federal criminal jurisdiction", but rather, that the Court's ruling was "simply the logical and unfortunate outgrowth of a questionable Supreme Court decision more than three decades old." Additionally, in his review of the Court's opinion for SCOTUSblog, Rory Little wrote that the majority's opinion "does not seem wrong as a matter of case-specific practical reality" but that the case may "raise more questions than answers for future federal official right extortion prosecutions." Jonathan H. Adler also characterized the Court's ruling as one of several cases released in early 2016, including Luis v. United States and Bank Markazi v. Peterson, that "produced some particularly interesting divisions among the justices".

== See also ==
- List of United States Supreme Court cases
- Lists of United States Supreme Court cases by volume
- List of United States Supreme Court cases by the Roberts Court
