= Nichols v. United States =

- Supreme Court of the United States

Argued March 1, 2016 Decided April 4, 2016
- Full case name: Lester Ray Nichols, Petitioner v. United States
- Docket no.: 15-5238
- Citations: 578 U.S. 104 (more) 136 S. Ct. 1113; 194 L. Ed. 2d 324

Case history
- Prior: United States v. Nichols, 775 F.3d 1225 (10th Cir. 2014); rehearing en banc denied, 784 F.3d 666 (10th Cir. 2015); cert. granted, 136 S. Ct. 445 (2015).

Holding
- The Sex Offender Registration and Notification Act does not require an individual to update his registration once departing a state.

Court membership
- Chief Justice John Roberts Associate Justices Anthony Kennedy · Clarence Thomas; Ruth Bader Ginsburg · Stephen Breyer; Samuel Alito · Sonia Sotomayor; Elena Kagan

Case opinion
- Majority: Alito, joined by unanimous

Laws applied
- Sex Offender Registration and Notification Act

Nichols v. United States, 578 U.S. 104 (2016), was a United States Supreme Court case in which the Court held that the Sex Offender Registration and Notification Act (SORNA) does not require an individual to update his registration after departing a state.

== Background ==
In 2003, Lester Ray Nichols was convicted of "traveling with intent to engage in illicit sexual conduct with a minor" under 18 U.S.C. § 2423(b). Congress passed the Sex Offender Registration and Notification Act (SORNA) in 2006 and the United States Attorney General determined in 2007 that the law applied retroactively. When Nichols was released in December 2011, he complied with SORNA's registration requirements, registering as a sex offender in Kansas. In November 2012, Nichols abruptly decided to leave Kansas and move to Manila in the Philippines.

Nichols was arrested and charged with violating SORNA reporting requirements. He filed a motion to "dismiss the indictment on the ground that SORNA did not require him to update his registration in Kansas"; however his motion was denied and "Nichols conditionally pleaded guilty, reserving his right to appeal the denial of his motion."

On appeal, the United States Court of Appeals for the Tenth Circuit affirmed his conviction. In a 2013 case involving a man from the Kansas City area who had also moved to the Philippines, the United States Court of Appeals for the Eighth Circuit held in United States v. Lunsford that the defendant had no obligation to update his registration. The U.S. Supreme Court granted certiorari to resolve the circuit split.

== Opinion of the Court ==
Associate Justice Samuel Alito authored a unanimous decision holding that a plain text reading of SORNA applies to a place in which a resident resides, not resided. Because the Philippines is a foreign jurisdiction where SORNA is inapplicable and because the law uses the present tense, Nichols had no obligation under this federal law to update his registration. Under Kansas state law and under the subsequently enacted federal legislation, Nichols does have an obligation to update his registration information.
