= Simmons v. Himmelreich =

- Supreme Court of the United States

Argued March 22, 2016 Decided June 6, 2016
- Full case name: Jermaine Simmons, et al., Petitioners v. Walter J. Himmelreich
- Docket no.: 15-109
- Citations: 578 U.S. 621 (more) 136 S. Ct. 1843; 195 L. Ed. 2d 106
- Opinion announcement: Opinion announcement

Holding
- State officials may still be liable for conduct that the state is immune to under exceptions within the Federal Tort Claims Act.

Court membership
- Chief Justice John Roberts Associate Justices Anthony Kennedy · Clarence Thomas; Ruth Bader Ginsburg · Stephen Breyer; Samuel Alito · Sonia Sotomayor; Elena Kagan

Case opinion
- Majority: Sotomayor, joined by unanimous

Laws applied
- Federal Tort Claims Act

Simmons v. Himmelreich, 578 U.S. 621 (2016), was a United States Supreme Court case in which the court held that state officials may still be liable for conduct that the state is immune to under exceptions within the Federal Tort Claims Act (FTCA).

== Opinion of the court ==
Associate Justice Sonia Sotomayor authored the unanimous decision holding that Himmelreich's second lawsuit can proceed, even after the first suit was dismissed under an exception to the Federal Tort Claims Act.
