= Husky International Electronics, Inc. v. Ritz =

- Supreme Court of the United States

Decided May 16, 2016
- Full case name: Husky International Electronics, Inc. v. Ritz
- Docket no.: 15-145
- Citations: 578 U.S. 355 (more)

Holding
- The term "actual fraud" in the discharge exceptions of Chapter 7 of the Bankruptcy Code encompasses fraudulent conveyance schemes even when those schemes do not involve a false representation.

Court membership
- Chief Justice John Roberts Associate Justices Anthony Kennedy · Clarence Thomas; Ruth Bader Ginsburg · Stephen Breyer; Samuel Alito · Sonia Sotomayor; Elena Kagan

Case opinions
- Majority: Sotomayor, joined by Roberts, Kennedy, Ginsburg, Breyer, Alito, Kagan
- Dissent: Thomas

Laws applied
- 11 U.S.C. § 523(a)(2)(A)

Husky International Electronics, Inc. v. Ritz, 578 U.S. 355 (2016), was a United States Supreme Court case in which the court held that the term "actual fraud" in the discharge exceptions of Chapter 7 of the Bankruptcy Code encompasses fraudulent conveyance schemes even when those schemes do not involve a false representation.

== Background ==
Chrysalis Manufacturing Corp. incurred a debt to Husky International Electronics, Inc. of nearly $164,000. Daniel Lee Ritz, Jr., Chrysalis' director and part-owner at the time, drained Chrysalis of assets available to pay the debt by transferring large sums of money to other entities Ritz controlled. Husky sued Ritz to recover on the debt. Ritz then filed for Chapter 7 bankruptcy, prompting Husky to file a complaint in Ritz' bankruptcy case, seeking to hold him personally liable and contending that the debt was not dischargeable because Ritz' intercompany-transfer scheme constituted "actual fraud" under the Bankruptcy Code's discharge exceptions.

The federal district court held that Ritz was personally liable under state law but also held that the debt was not "obtained by... actual fraud" under the relevant definition in the Bankruptcy Code and thus could be discharged in bankruptcy. The Fifth Circuit Court of Appeals affirmed, holding that a misrepresentation from a debtor to a creditor is a necessary element of "actual fraud" and was lacking in this case, because Ritz made no false representations to Husky regarding the transfer of Chrysalis' assets.

== Opinion of the court ==
The Supreme Court issued an opinion, authored by Justice Sotomayor, on May 16, 2016. Justice Sotomayor begins the decision by citing to the US Bakruptcy Code which prevents people from discharging debts which are, "obtained by . . . false pretenses, a false representation, or actual fraud." Sotomayor notes there was a circuit split as to whether "actual fraud" requires specifically a false representation, or if "actual fraud" encompassed a broader concept of fraud that can be achieved without a false representation. Chrysalis's director was accused of draining Chrysalis's account and transferring it to other entities controlled by said director; as if the assets were no longer in Chrysalis's corporate entity, they would not be reachable by creditors, viz. Husky. As mentioned, the Fifth circuit court of appeals determined that this conveyance did not amount of "actual fraud." Sotomayor says that this decision deepened a court split on the issue, and they granted certiorari to resolve that split.

Sotomayor begins with a historical analysis of the statute in question, 11 U.S.C. §523. Prior to 1978, the statute prevented discharges of debts obtained by, "false pretenses or false representations," and did not mention fraud. In 1978, Congress amended the statute and added the words "actual fraud," to the list of things that prevent the discharge of debt. The question is then, did Congress intend for the phrase "actual fraud" to include fraudulent conveyances, which were alleged in this case? If so, then Chrysalis could not discharge their debts through bankruptcy. If not, then they could. Sotomayor goes through historical definitions and understandings of fraud.

Sotomayor starts be saying that the term "actual" is simply differentiating the fraud at issue from other types of fraud, such as implied fraud, or fraud-in-law. She says that historical definitions of fraud are more difficult to pin down. She points to one of the first Bankruptcy acts in England, the Statute of 13 Elizabeth. That statute explicitly listed fraudulent conveyances, that is, conveyances made with the intent of hiding asserts from creditors, as included in the definition of "fraud." Additionally, Sotomayor argues that, at common law, fraudulent conveyances were still considered a "fraud" in other contexts, despite not involving a fraudulent misrepresentation. Thus, the majority concludes that Congress intended fraudulent conveyances to be within the purview of "actual fraud."

Because the majority found that fraudulent conveyances were considered "actual fraud," as used in 11 U.S.C. §523, the Court reversed the opinion of the 5th circuit court of appeals, and remanded the case for

== Dissent ==
Justice Thomas filed a lone dissent in this case. Thomas agrees that, at common law, fraud includes fraudulent transfers. However, he argues that, "...context dictates that 'actual fraud' ordinarily does not include fraudulent transfers because 'that meaning does not fit' with the rest of §523(a)(2).

Thomas argues that 11 U.S.C. §523 specifically applies to debts which were, "obtained by" fraud. He argues that the phrase "obtained by" has an, "... 'inherent' 'element of causation,' and refers to those debts 'resulting from' or 'traceable to' fraud.". Thomas argues that the debt in this case was not "obtained" as a result of fraud, rather only when the creditor attempted to collect on the debt, that fraud occurred. In Thomas view, then, he argues that the debt cannot be considered "obtained by" fraud, and therefore this action is out of the scope of 11 U.S.C. §523.
