= Kirtsaeng v. John Wiley & Sons, Inc. (2016) =

- Supreme Court of the United States

Decided June 16, 2016
- Full case name: Kirtsaeng v. John Wiley & Sons, Inc.
- Docket no.: 15-375
- Citations: 579 U.S. ___ (more)

Holding
- When deciding whether to award attorney's fees under the Copyright Act's fee-shifting provision, a district court should give substantial weight to the objective reasonableness of the losing party's position, while still taking into account all other circumstances relevant to granting fees. There is no particular presumption against awarding fees.

Court membership
- Chief Justice John Roberts Associate Justices Anthony Kennedy · Clarence Thomas; Ruth Bader Ginsburg · Stephen Breyer; Samuel Alito · Sonia Sotomayor; Elena Kagan

Kirtsaeng v. John Wiley & Sons, Inc., 579 U.S. ___ (2016), was a United States Supreme Court case in which the court held that when deciding whether to award attorney's fees under the Copyright Act's fee-shifting provision, a district court should give substantial weight to the objective reasonableness of the losing party's position, while still taking into account all other circumstances relevant to granting fees. There is no particular presumption against awarding fees.

== Background ==
In Kirtsaeng v. John Wiley & Sons, Inc., the Supreme Court held that Supap Kirtsaeng could invoke the Copyright Act's "first-sale doctrine" as a defense to the copyright infringement claim filed by textbook publisher John Wiley & Sons, Inc. Having won his case, Kirtsaeng returned to the federal district court to seek more than $2 million in attorney's fees from Wiley under the Copyright Act's fee-shifting provision. The district court denied Kirtsaeng's application because, it reasoned, imposing a fee award against a losing party that had taken reasonable positions during litigation (as Wiley had done) would not serve the Act's purposes. Affirming, the Second Circuit Court of Appeals held that the district court was correct to place "substantial weight" on the reasonableness of Wiley's position and that the District Court did not abuse its discretion in determining that the other factors did not outweigh the reasonableness finding.

== Opinion of the court ==
The Supreme Court issued an opinion on June 16, 2016.
