= Kingdomware Technologies, Inc. v. United States =

- Supreme Court of the United States

Argued February 22, 2016 Decided June 16, 2016
- Full case name: Kingdomware Technologies, Inc., Petitioner v. United States
- Docket no.: 14-916
- Citations: 579 U.S. ___ (more) 136 S. Ct. 1969; 195 L. Ed. 2d 334
- Opinion announcement: Opinion announcement

Case history
- Prior: 754 F.3d 923 (Fed. Cir. 2014)

Holding
- The Department of Veterans Affairs must apply the "Rule of Two" when considering and awarding contracts under the Veterans Benefits, Health Care, and Information Technology Act of 2006. The rule is mandatory, not discretionary, regardless of whether the rule is being used to meet annual minimum contracting goals.

Court membership
- Chief Justice John Roberts Associate Justices Anthony Kennedy · Clarence Thomas; Ruth Bader Ginsburg · Stephen Breyer; Samuel Alito · Sonia Sotomayor; Elena Kagan

Case opinion
- Majority: Thomas, joined by unanimous

Laws applied
- Veterans Benefits, Health Care, and Information Technology Act of 2006

Kingdomware Technologies, Inc. v. United States, 579 U.S. ___ (2016), was a United States Supreme Court case in which the Court held that the Department of Veterans Affairs must apply the "Rule of Two" when considering and awarding contracts under the Veterans Benefits, Health Care, and Information Technology Act of 2006.

By containing the word "shall" the rule becomes mandatory, not discretionary, regardless of whether the rule is being used to meet annual minimum contracting goals.

== Opinion of the Court ==
Associate Justice Clarence Thomas authored a unanimous opinion.
