= Molina-Martinez v. United States =

- Supreme Court of the United States

Argued January 12, 2016 Decided April 20, 2016
- Full case name: Saul Molina-Martinez, Petitioner v. United States
- Docket no.: 14-8913
- Citations: 578 U.S. 189 (more) 136 S. Ct. 1338; 194 L. Ed. 2d 444
- Opinion announcement: Opinion announcement

Holding
- Courts may not have rigid requirements for additional evidence in proceedings to remedy incorrect sentencing guidelines.

Court membership
- Chief Justice John Roberts Associate Justices Anthony Kennedy · Clarence Thomas; Ruth Bader Ginsburg · Stephen Breyer; Samuel Alito · Sonia Sotomayor; Elena Kagan

Case opinions
- Majority: Kennedy, joined by Roberts, Ginsburg, Breyer, Sotomayor, Kagan
- Concurrence: Alito (in part), joined by Thomas

Laws applied
- Peugh v. United States

Molina-Martinez v. United States, 578 U.S. 189 (2016), was a United States Supreme Court case in which the Court held that the United States Court of Appeals for the Fifth Circuit's reliance on a requirement that defendants show "additional evidence" to show substantial harm arising from incorrect sentencing guidelines is impermissible.

== Background ==
Saul Molina-Martinez was convicted of aggravated burglary in 2002 and again in 2011. He was arrested in 2012 at a border checkpoint in Texas and later pleaded guilty to being unlawfully present in the United States after being deported for an aggravated felony. The Probation Office prepared a presentence report, as required by law, for Molina-Martinez which recommended a sentence of between 77 and 96 months in prison.

Presentencing reports recommend a sentence by using an elaborate set of rules to evaluate the criminal history of the defendant and the severity of the crimes, known as the offense level. The recommended sentence for Molina-Martinez was based upon a mistake in calculating his offense level which resulted in a higher recommended sentence. The Probation Office gave Molina-Martinez an offense level of 21 points, with 18 of those points being based upon his criminal history. Of those 18 points, 11 were from five aggravated burglary convictions handed down on the same day. The Probation Office treated them as separate convictions, but because the sentencing for those five convictions occurred on the same day, the guidelines dictate that they be treated as one conviction, not separately. Calculated correctly, the convictions would have resulted in 5 points rather than 11, dropping the recommended sentence range to 70 to 87 months.

No one noticed this error at trial, and the judge sentenced Molina-Martinez to 77 months in prison, the minimum recommended by the incorrect guidelines. On appeal, Molina-Martinez raised the calculation error for the first time. Because Molina-Martinez's lawyer did not object at trial, Molina-Martinez was required to show that the mistake was not a harmless error but impacted his substantial rights. The court of appeals ruled against Molina-Martinez stating that an incorrect sentencing range in and of itself is not sufficient to show substantial harm. Because of disagreement among the courts of appeals on how to decide errors in sentencing reports, the Supreme Court granted certiorari.

=== Oral arguments ===
Arguing for Molina-Martinez, Timothy Crooks relied on the court's decision in Peugh v. United States which noted the importance of federal sentencing guidelines in the sentencing of defendants. Crooks argued that "the natural effect of an erroneously high Guideline range is to skew a defendant’s sentence higher than it would have been under the correct range." Justices Scalia and Alito questioned Crooks as to how this would shift the burden from the defendant to the prosecution on appeal. Crooks responded by pointing out that the effect of the guidelines is prejudicial and that the defendant on appeal would need to show more than prejudice to succeed.

== Opinion of the Court ==
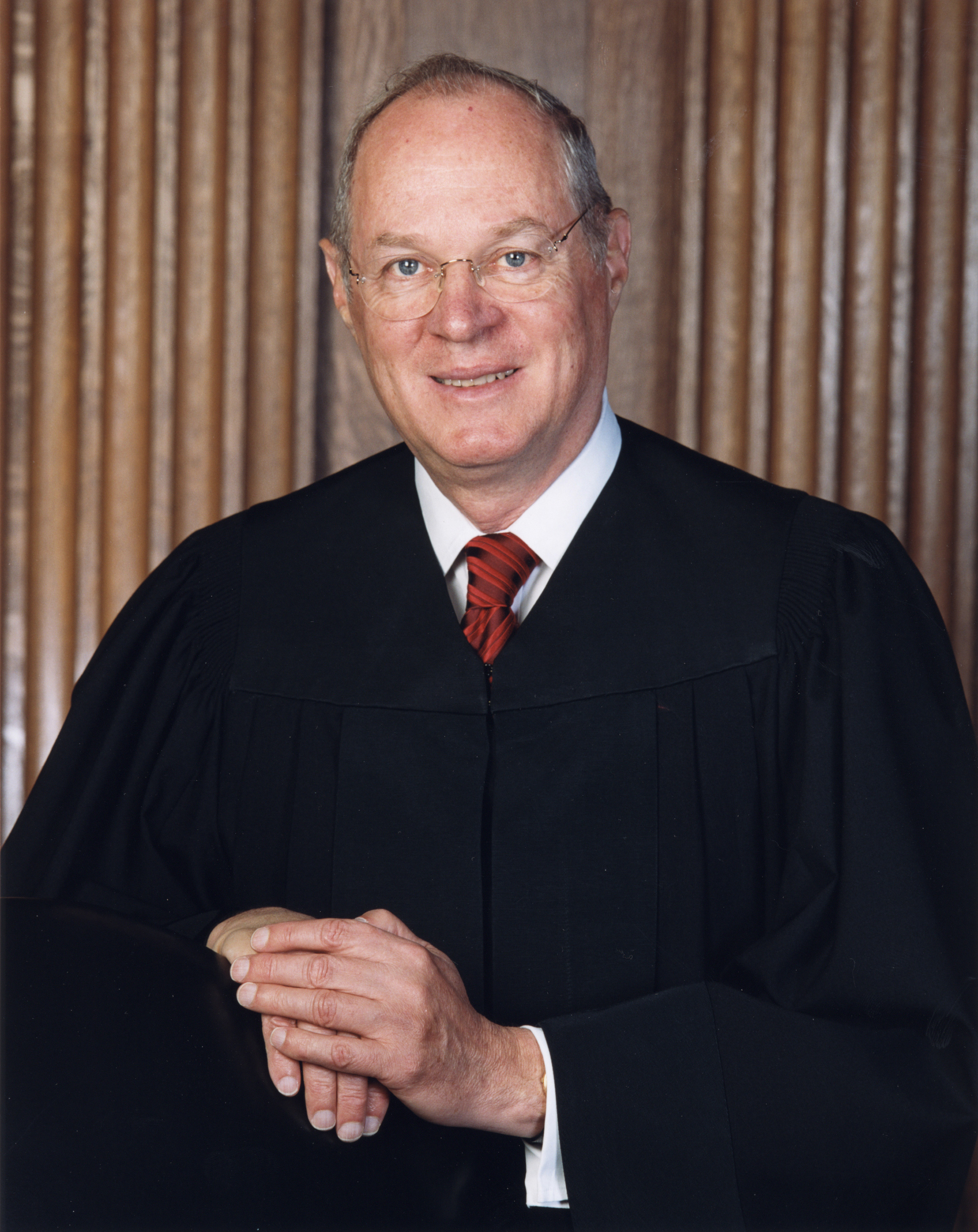
Justice Kennedy delivered the opinion of the Court

In a 6-2 decision authored by Justice Kennedy the Court ruled that courts may not have rigid requirements for additional evidence to hear a case if the sentencing guidelines were in error.
