= Harris v. Arizona Independent Redistricting Commission =

- Supreme Court of the United States

Argued December 8, 2015 Decided April 20, 2016
- Full case name: Wesley W. Harris, et al., appellants v. Arizona Independent Redistricting Commission, et al.
- Docket no.: 14-232
- Citations: 578 U.S. 253 (more) 136 S. Ct. 1301; 194 L. Ed. 2d 497
- Argument: Oral argument

Case history
- Prior: 993 F. Supp. 2d 1042 (D. Ariz. 2014); probable jurisdiction noted, 135 S. Ct. 2926 (2015).

Holding
- Population deviations for legislative districts predominantly reflected commission's good-faith efforts to comply with Voting Rights Act and obtain preclearance from Department of Justice.

Court membership
- Chief Justice John Roberts Associate Justices Anthony Kennedy · Clarence Thomas; Ruth Bader Ginsburg · Stephen Breyer; Samuel Alito · Sonia Sotomayor; Elena Kagan

Case opinion
- Majority: Breyer, joined by unanimous

Laws applied
- U.S. Const., Amdt. XIV

Harris v. Arizona Independent Redistricting Commission, 578 U.S. 253 (2016), was a United States Supreme Court case in which the Court held that the one person, one vote principle under the Equal Protection Clause of the Fourteenth Amendment allows a state's redistricting commission slight variances in drawing of legislative districts provided that the variance does not exceed 10 percent. The Court found that the map, created by a bipartisan commission on the basis of the 2010 census, was constitutional.

== See also ==
- Evenwel v. Abbott
- Reynolds v. Sims — a United States Supreme Court case that ruled that state legislature districts had to be roughly equal in population.
