= Rutan v. Republican Party of Illinois =

- Supreme Court of the United States

Argued January 16, 1990 Decided June 21, 1990
- Full case name: Rutan, et al. v. Republican Party of Illinois, et al.
- Docket no.: 88-1872
- Citations: 497 U.S. 62 (more) 110 S. Ct. 2729; 111 L. Ed. 2d 52; 1990 U.S. LEXIS 3298
- Argument: Oral argument

Case history
- Prior: Judgment for the defendant, 641 F. Supp. 249 (1986); affirmed in part and reversed in part, 868 F. 2d 943 (1989).

Holding
- Promotion, transfer, recall, and/or hiring decisions involving low-level public employees may not be constitutionally based on party affiliation and support pursuant to the First Amendment of the United States Constitution.

Court membership
- Chief Justice William Rehnquist Associate Justices William J. Brennan Jr. · Byron White; Thurgood Marshall · Harry Blackmun; John P. Stevens · Sandra Day O'Connor; Antonin Scalia · Anthony Kennedy

Case opinions
- Majority: Brennan, joined by White, Marshall, Blackmun, Stevens
- Concurrence: Stevens
- Dissent: Scalia, joined by Rehnquist, Kennedy; O'Connor (parts II, III)

Laws applied
- U.S. Const. amend. I

Rutan v. Republican Party of Illinois, 497 U.S. 62 (1990), was a United States Supreme Court decision that held that the First Amendment forbids a government entity from basing its decision to promote, transfer, recall, or hire low-level public employees based upon their party affiliation.

== Background ==
Illinois governor James Thompson issued an executive order instituting a hiring freeze, whereby state officials were prohibited from hiring any employee, filling any vacancy, creating any new position, or taking any similar action without the governor's "express permission." It affected approximately 60,000 state positions. More than 5,000 of these become available each year as a result of resignations, retirements, deaths, expansion, and reorganizations. The order proclaimed that "no exceptions" were permitted without the Governor's "express permission after submission of appropriate requests to [his] office."

Petitioner alleged that requests for the governor's "express permission" had become routine. Permission had been granted or withheld through an agency expressly created for that purpose, the Governor's Office of Personnel (governor's office). Agencies had been screening applicants under Illinois' civil service system, making their personnel choices, and submitting them as requests to be approved or disapproved by the governor's office. Among the employment decisions for which approvals had been required are new hires, promotions, transfers, and recalls after layoffs.

By means of the freeze, according to petitioners, the governor had been using the governor's office to operate a political patronage system to limit state employment and beneficial employment-related decisions to those who were supported by the Republican Party of the United States. In reviewing an agency's request that a particular applicant be approved for a particular position, the governor's office looked at whether the applicant voted in Republican primaries in past election years, whether the applicant had provided financial or other support to the Republican Party and its candidates, whether the applicant had promised to join and work for the Republican Party in the future, and whether the applicant had the support of Republican Party officials at state or local levels.

Five people brought suit against various Illinois and Republican Party officials in the United States District Court for the Central District of Illinois. They alleged that they had suffered discrimination with respect to state employment because they had not been supporters of the state's Republican Party and that this discrimination violated the First Amendment.

== Issues ==
At issue was whether the decision of the governor to make hiring decisions contingent upon party affiliation violated the petitioner's First Amendment rights to freedom of speech and of freedom of association.

== Opinion of the court ==
In an opinion by Justice Brennan and decided 5-4, the court held that a government agency cannot constitutionally base employment-related decisions upon an employee or prospective employee's party affiliation. Citing Elrod v. Burns, the court reasoned that conditioning public employment on the provision of support for the favored political party "unquestionably inhibits protected belief and association."

In Elrod v. Burns, the court had reasoned that conditioning employment on political activity pressures employees to pledge political allegiance to a party with which they prefer not to associate, to work for the election of political candidates they do not support, and to contribute money to be used to further policies with which they do not agree. The latter, the plurality noted, had been recognized as "tantamount to coerced belief."

The court acknowledged that a government entity has a significant interest in ensuring that it has effective and efficient employees. However, the court expressed doubt that the "mere difference of political persuasion motivates poor performance." In any case, the government can ensure employee effectiveness and efficiency through the less drastic means of discharging staff members whose work is inadequate.

Although the preservation of the democratic process "may in some instances justify limitations on First Amendment freedoms," the "process functions as well without the practice, perhaps even better." Patronage "can result in the entrenchment of one or a few parties to the exclusion of others," and "is a very effective impediment to the associational and speech freedoms which are essential to a meaningful system of democratic government."

Citing Speiser v. Randall, the court noted that "for at least a quarter-century, this Court has made clear that, even though a person has no 'right' to a valuable governmental benefit, and even though the government may deny him the benefit for any number of reasons, there are some reasons upon which the government may not rely. It may not deny a benefit to a person on a basis that infringes his constitutionally protected interests - especially, his interest in freedom of speech. For if the government could deny a benefit to a person because of his constitutionally protected speech or associations, his exercise of those freedoms would in effect be penalized and inhibited. This would allow the government to `produce a result which [it] could not command directly.' Such interference with constitutional rights is impermissible."

The court further reasoned that employees who find themselves in dead-end positions due to their political backgrounds would be adversely affected by the Governor's order. They would feel a significant obligation to support political positions held by their superiors, and to refrain from acting on the political views they actually hold, in order to progress up the career ladder. Employees denied transfers to workplaces reasonably close to their homes until they join and work for the Republican Party would feel a daily pressure from their long commutes to do so. And employees who have been laid off may well have felt compelled to engage in whatever political activity was necessary to regain regular paychecks and positions corresponding to their skill and experience. Employees who do not compromise their beliefs stand to lose the considerable increases in pay and job satisfaction attendant on promotions, the hours and maintenance expenses that are consumed by long daily commutes, and even their jobs if they are not rehired after a "temporary" layoff.

In conclusion, the court determined that promotions, transfers, and recalls after layoffs based on political affiliation or support are an impermissible infringement on the First Amendment rights of public employees. The court decided that whether the four employees were in fact denied promotions, transfers, or rehire for failure to affiliate with and support the Republican Party was for the District Court to decide in the first instance.

=== Justice Scalia's dissent ===
Justice Scalia filed a dissenting opinion, which was joined by Chief Justice Rehnquist and Justice Kennedy; Justice O'Connor joined Parts II and III of Justice Scalia's dissent, but not Part I.

Justice Scalia argued that the restrictions that the U.S. Constitution places upon government in its capacity as a lawmaker are not the same as the restrictions that it places upon the government in its capacity as an employer. "Private citizens perhaps cannot be prevented from wearing long hair, but policemen can."

Justice Scalia wrote that the provisions of the U.S. Bill of Rights were designed to restrain transient majorities from impairing long-recognized personal liberties, but that they did not create by implication novel individual rights overturning accepted political norms. He reasoned that when a practice not expressly prohibited by the text of the Bill of Rights bears the endorsement of a long tradition of open, widespread, and unchallenged use that dates back to the beginning of the American Republic, the Supreme Court has no proper basis for striking it down.

Justice Scalia reasoned that political patronage has a long heritage in the history of the United States. He argued that the "Spoils System" largely enhanced by President Andrew Jackson was a testament to this heritage. Thus, Justice Scalia would have held that, while the First Amendment applies in full force to private individuals, it is severely restricted in its application for government employees. When weighed against the political heritage of the spoils system that was prevalent at the time the Bill of Rights was drafted, the court had no authority to whittle away at such a method of determining civil service.

== See also ==
- List of United States Supreme Court cases, volume 497
- Republican Party of Minnesota v. White (2002)
