= Branti v. Finkel =

- Supreme Court of the United States

Decided March 31, 1980
- Full case name: Branti v. Finkel
- Citations: 445 U.S. 507 (more)

Holding
- Public defenders cannot be fired solely based on their political affiliation.

Court membership
- Chief Justice Warren E. Burger Associate Justices William J. Brennan Jr. · Potter Stewart; Byron White · Thurgood Marshall; Harry Blackmun · Lewis F. Powell Jr. William Rehnquist · John P. Stevens

Branti v. Finkel, 445 U.S. 507 (1980), was a United States Supreme Court case in which the Court held that public defenders cannot be fired solely based on their political affiliation.

== Background ==
The two petitioners, Republicans, were Assistant Public Defenders fired by a newly elected county Public Defender affiliated with the Democrats. The decision here was based in part on the fact that the county Public Defender was not a policy-making position entitled to such a distinction among its employees, but the Court extended this doctrine in Rutan v. Republican Party of Illinois to protect government employees much more broadly.

== See also ==
- Elrod v. Burns
