= Evenwel v. Abbott =

- Supreme Court of the United States

Argued December 8, 2015 Decided April 4, 2016
- Full case name: Sue Evenwel, et al., appellants v. Greg Abbott, Governor of Texas, et al.
- Docket no.: 14-940
- Citations: 578 U.S. 54 (more) 136 S. Ct. 1120; 194 L. Ed. 2d 291
- Argument: Oral argument

Holding
- A state may draw its legislative districts based on total population.

Court membership
- Chief Justice John Roberts Associate Justices Anthony Kennedy · Clarence Thomas; Ruth Bader Ginsburg · Stephen Breyer; Samuel Alito · Sonia Sotomayor; Elena Kagan

Case opinions
- Majority: Ginsburg, joined by Roberts, Kennedy, Breyer, Sotomayor, Kagan
- Concurrence: Thomas (in judgment)
- Concurrence: Alito (in judgment), joined by Thomas (except Part III–B)

Laws applied
- U.S. Const. amend. XIV

Evenwel v. Abbott, 136 S. Ct. 1120 (2016), was a United States Supreme Court case in which the Court held that the principle of one person, one vote, under the Equal Protection Clause of the Fourteenth Amendment of the United States Constitution allows states to use total population, not just total voting-eligible population, to draw legislative districts.

== Background ==
The suit originated when Sue Evenwel and Edward Pfenninger filed suit in the United States District Court for the Western District of Texas, arguing that districts drawn based on total population dilute their vote compared to those in other Texas Senate districts. The district court dismissed the complaint for lack of a claim on which relief could be granted.

The question presented to the Court was the following: "Whether the 'one-person, one-vote' principle of the Fourteenth Amendment creates a judicially enforceable right ensuring that the districting process does not deny voters an equal vote."

== Opinion of the Court ==
The Supreme Court affirmed the District Court and held that total population may be used in redistricting. It did not rule on whether states are permitted to base districts on the number of eligible voters, instead of the total population.

== See also ==
- Edward Blum – director of Project on Fair Representation
- Reynolds v. Sims – a United States Supreme Court case that ruled that state legislature districts had to be roughly equal in population.
