= Beath–Dickey House =

Beath-Dickey House
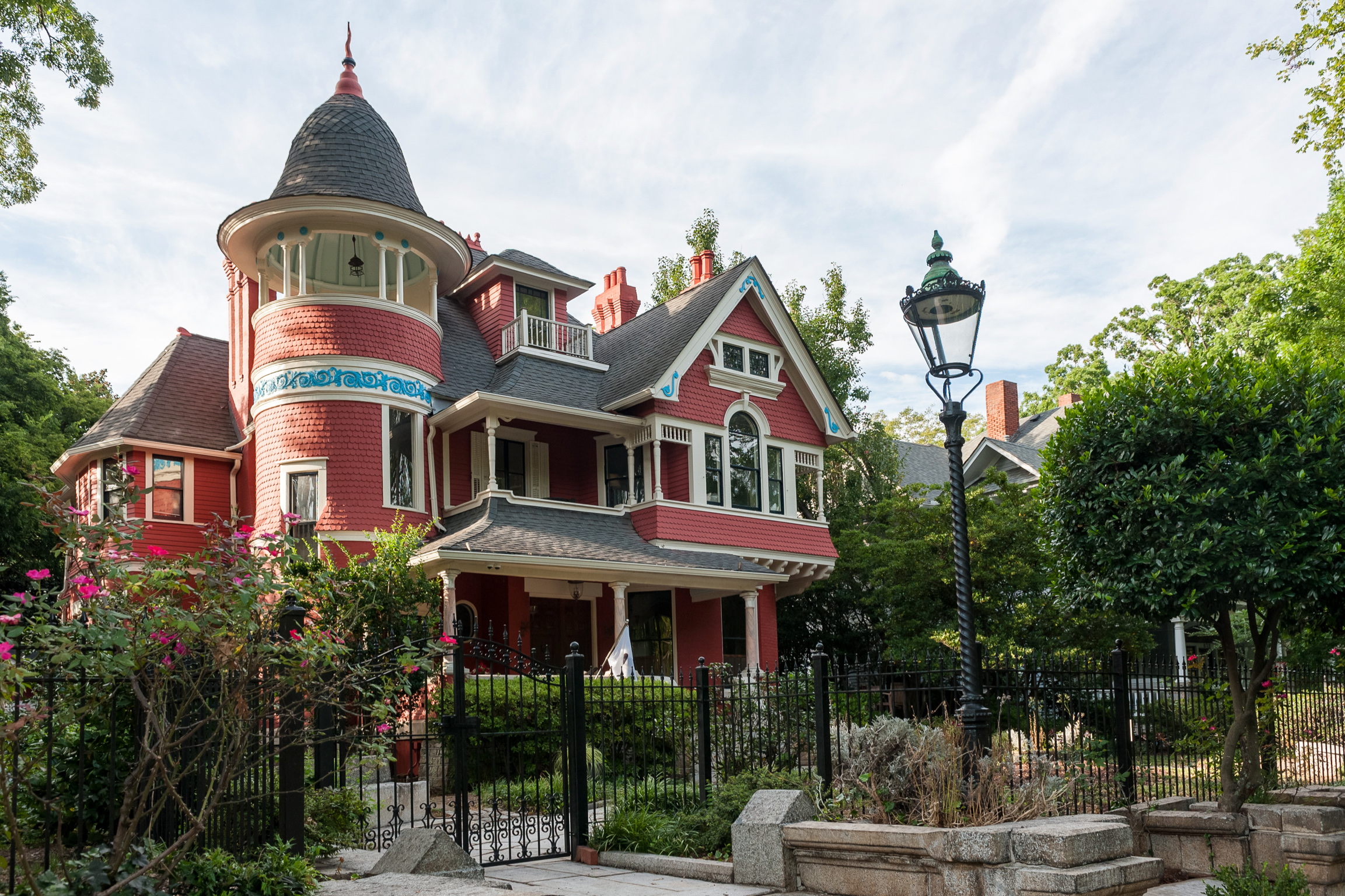
- The house in 2018
- Location: 866 Euclid Avenue, Atlanta, GA
- Coordinates: 33.75683°N 84.35878°W
- Built: 1890
- Built for: John M. Beath
- Restored by: Robert Griggs
- Architectural style(s): Queen Anne

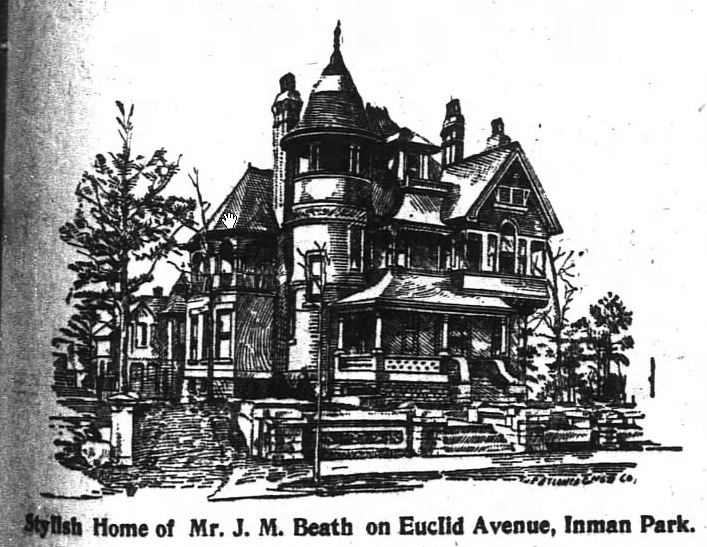
Beath–Dickey house, 1896

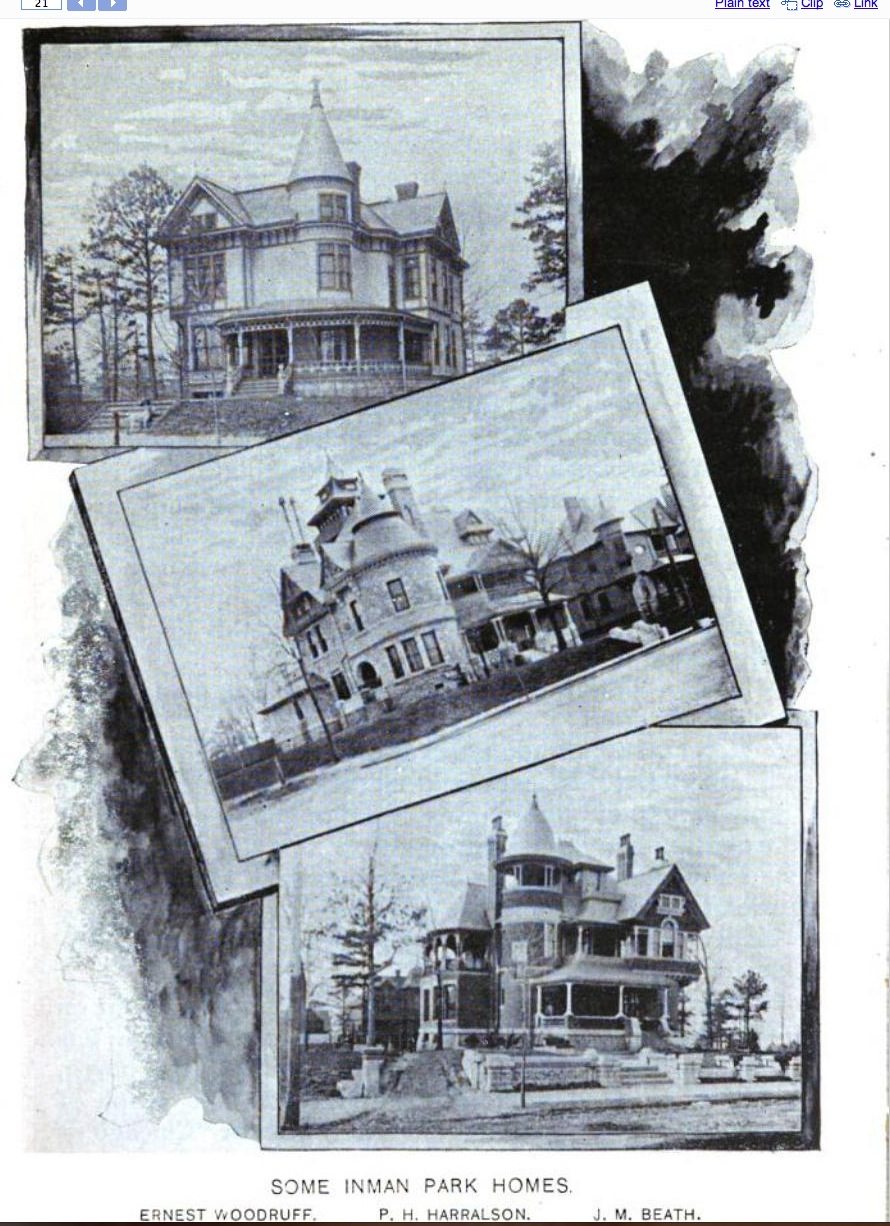
Sketches of three Inman Park houses, 1895; Ernest Woodruff's house at top; Beath–Dickey House at bottom

The Beath–Dickey House (1890) is a Queen Anne Victorian house located at 866 Euclid Avenue in the Inman Park neighborhood of Atlanta, Georgia. It was one of the houses of note when the Inman Park – Atlanta's first streetcar suburb – was established.

== Construction ==
John M. Beath was an "ice magnate", owner of the Georgia Ice Company on Alabama St. Legend has it that British-born Beath built the house to lure his fiancée from Boston to Atlanta, but that she never married him.

== Early Days ==
During the 1910s and 1920s the Dickey Family lived in the house which in the numbering at the time was 38 Euclid Avenue. John R. Dickey was an officer of the Guarantee Trust and Banking Company which was established in 1907 and was a Mason. His wife was active in the Baptist Woman's Missionary union.

== Renovation ==
After Inman Park deteriorated due to the flight of the upper and middle classes to the suburbs, the house played a central role in the neighborhood's renaissance. Interior designer Robert (Bob) Griggs and his partner Robert Aiken bought the house in 1969 and their renovation of the house sparked the conversion of Inman Park from a slum to a desirable intown neighborhood.

The house is featured in many architectural guides to Atlanta, including the AIA Guide to the Architecture of Atlanta and in Elle Decor magazine, 2003.

In 2019 the house was used as Regina's (played by Christine Baranski) house in Dolly Parton's Christmas on the Square.
