= Musacchio =

Musacchio is an Italian surname. Notable people with the surname include:

- Andrea Musacchio (born 1964), Italian structural biologist
- Mateo Musacchio (born 1990), Argentine footballer
- Roberto Musacchio (born 1956), Italian politician

== See also ==
- Musacchio v. United States
