= Lockhart v. United States =

Lockhart v. United States may refer to:

- Lockhart v. United States, 577 U.S. ___ (2016), a case on the interpretation of a qualifier phrase in a federal statute
- Lockhart v. United States, 546 U.S. 142 (2005), a case on whether the government can withhold Social Security benefits to collect student loan debt
- City of Lockhart v. United States, 460 U.S. 125 (1983), a case on whether election law changes violated the Voting Rights Act
