= George Woodruff =

George Woodruff may refer to:

- George Catlin Woodruff (1805–1885), American politician, U.S. Representative from Connecticut
- George Cecil Woodruff (1888–1968), American businessman and football coach
- George Washington Woodruff (1864–1934), American football coach acting Secretary of the Interior
- Bob Woodruff (American football) (George Robert Woodruff, 1916–2001), American football coach
- George W. Woodruff (1895–1987), American businessman and philanthropist
