= Robert W. Woodruff =

American businessman (1889–1985)

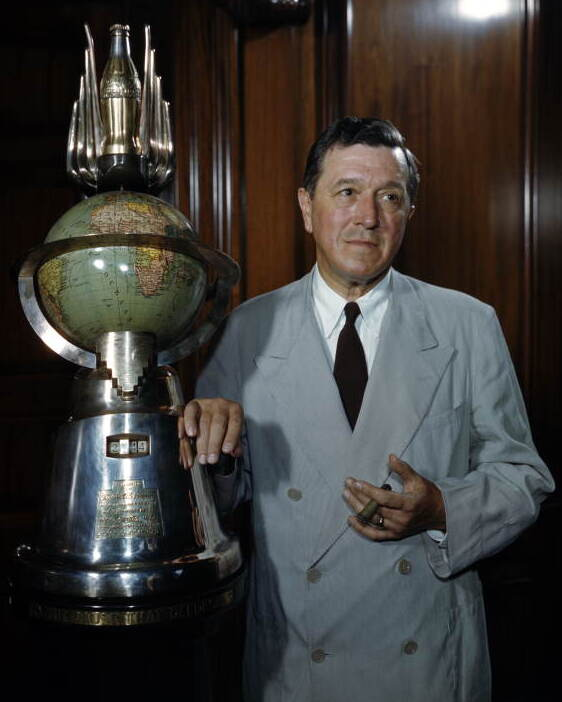
- Woodruff in 1944
- Born: December 6, 1889; Columbus, Georgia, U.S.
- Died: March 7, 1985 (aged 95)
- Resting place: Westview Cemetery
- Spouse: Nell Kendall Hodgson
- Parents: Ernest Woodruff (father); Emily Carolyn Winship (mother)

Robert Winship Woodruff (December 6, 1889 – March 7, 1985) was an American businessman who served as the president of The Coca-Cola Company from 1923 until 1955. With a large net worth, he was also a major philanthropist, and many educational and cultural landmarks in the U.S. city of Atlanta, Georgia, bear his name. Included among these are the Woodruff Arts Center, Woodruff Park, and the Robert W. Woodruff Library.

== Early life ==
Woodruff was born in Columbus, Georgia, the son of Ernest Woodruff, an Atlanta businessman who, among other things, was leader of the group of investors who bought The Coca-Cola Company from Asa Griggs Candler in 1919. His grandfather was Atlanta manufacturing magnate Robert Winship.

After graduating from the Georgia Military Academy he attended Georgia Tech, where he failed out, and then the Emory University campus at Oxford, Georgia, for one term, where he excelled at "cutting classes and spending money".

== Career and personal life ==
In February 1909, at age 19, spurning his father's work offers, he began work as a laborer at the General Pipe and Foundry Company foundry in Inman Park, Atlanta. For a week he shoveled and shifted sand, then worked a lathe as a machinist's apprentice. After a year he was fired. But then he was rehired by General's parent company, General Fire Extinguisher where he worked his way into sales. He then accepted a job offer from his father at Atlantic Ice and Coal Company but left after differences with him. Woodruff parlayed his love of early automobiling into a sales position at White Motor Company based in Cleveland, Ohio, and quickly rose to become vice president of that company. During World War I, Woodruff joined the U.S. Ordnance Department where he promoted a truck design that only White Motors could fulfill, giving the company huge war-time sales.

In an effort to reconcile personal differences, his father Ernest offered Robert Woodruff the position of president of the Coca-Cola Co.

On October 17, 1912, Woodruff married Nell Kendall Hodgson (October 20, 1892 – January 23, 1968), a nurse from Athens, Georgia. The couple had no children.

In 1926, at the age of 37, Woodruff built Coca-Cola into an international company, establishing a foreign department.

In 1955, he stepped down as president but remained on the board of directors until 1984. His large shareholding and influence on the board's powerful Finance Committee gave him significant control over much of the company's direction for almost 60 years.

Woodruff died on March 7, 1985, at the age of 95. He was buried at the Westview Cemetery in southwest Atlanta. The Robert W. Woodruff Foundation received funds from the estate and continues his legacy of philanthropy in the state of Georgia.

== Legacy ==
In 1979, Woodruff and his brother George W. Woodruff gave $105 million to Emory University; they would eventually give a total of $230 million. Several buildings on the Emory campus are named for him and members of his family. The Robert W. Woodruff Professorships are named for him.

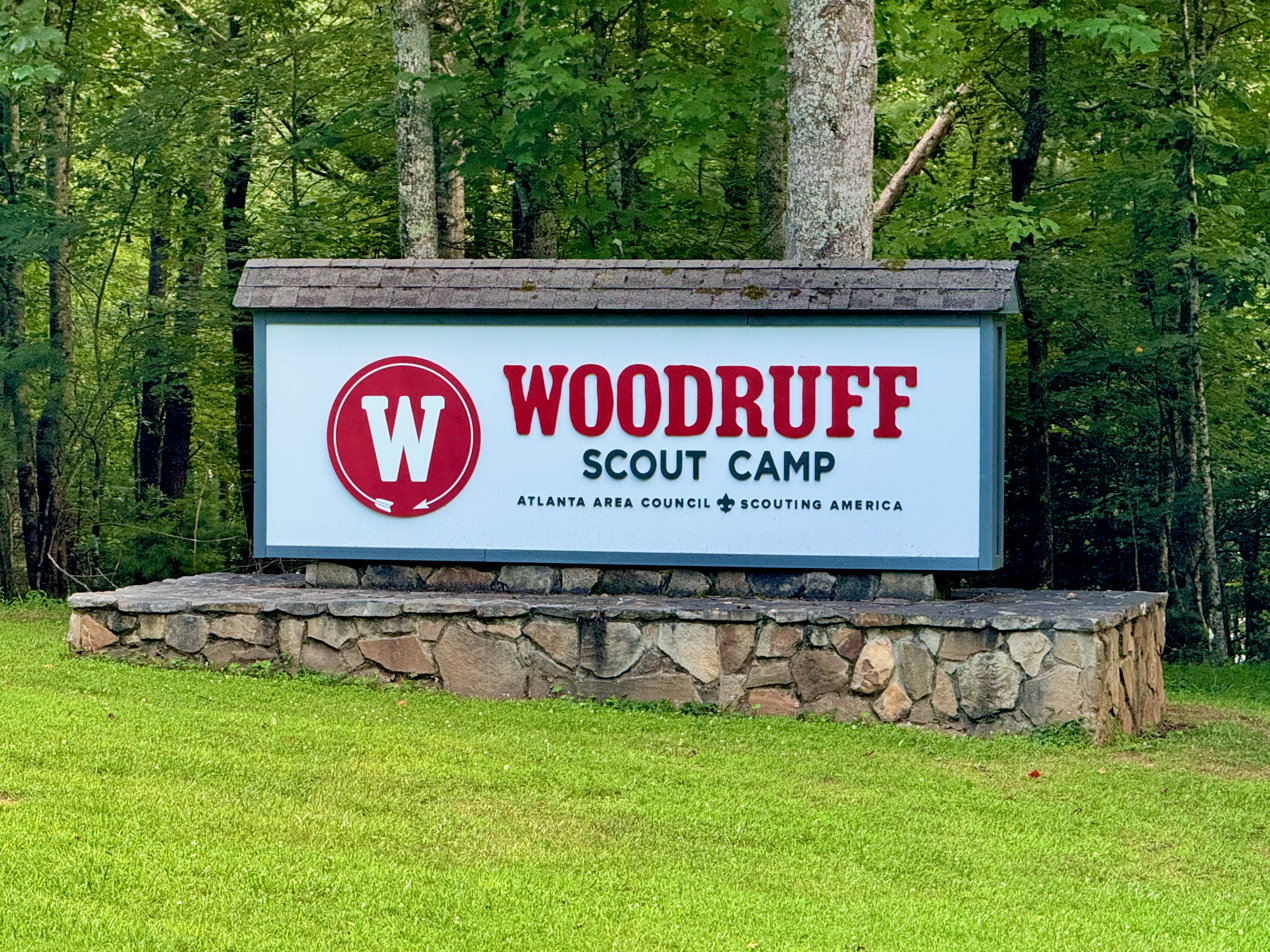
Robert W. Woodruff Scout Camp near Blairsville, Georgia

He also gave large sums of money to other area colleges and universities and to Woodward Academy (formerly Georgia Military Academy) in College Park and the Westminster Schools in Atlanta. A Boy Scout camp in Blairsville, Georgia named the Robert W. Woodruff Scout Reservation, which is run by the Atlanta Area Council, was built following major donations from the Woodruff Foundation and Coca-Cola. Atlanta's largest cultural institution, the Woodruff Arts Center, benefited from his gifts and is named for him, as is Woodruff Park. A Robert W. Woodruff library is located in the Atlanta University Center and serves Morehouse College, Spelman College, and Clark Atlanta University. Another Robert W. Woodruff Library houses Emory University's main library.

Woodruff was inducted into the Junior Achievement U.S. Business Hall of Fame in 1977.

After Mayor Allen stepped up his efforts to convince him, Woodruff was instrumental in the success of the dinner held in Atlanta honoring the Reverend Dr. Martin Luther King Jr., after King received the Nobel Peace Prize in 1964. Ticket sales were lagging until Woodruff signaled his support for the dinner. However, Woodruff still did not attend the dinner.

The Jones Center at Ichauway (formerly named the Joseph W. Jones Ecological Research Center) was established in 1991 following the death of Woodruff to solidify the wishes in his will that Ichauway Plantation (his personal quail hunting preserve from 1929 to 1985) be held in a form of land conservation. Ichauway is a 29,000-acre property in Baker County, Georgia, that is home to a private, nonprofit research center that studies the woods, water, and wildlife of the longleaf pine ecosystem. Ichauway is owned by The Robert W. Woodruff Foundation.

Business positions
Preceded by Ernest Woodruff	President of The Coca-Cola Company; 1923–1954	Succeeded by William E. Robinson
