= Kansas v. Carr =

- Supreme Court of the United States

Argued October 7, 2015 Decided January 20, 2016
- Full case name: Kansas, Petitioner v. Jonathan D. Carr; Kansas, Petitioner v. Reginald Dexter Carr, Jr.; Kansas, Petitioner v. Sidney J. Gleason
- Docket nos.: 14-449; 14-450; 14-452
- Citations: 577 U.S. 108 (more) 136 S. Ct. 633; 193 L. Ed. 2d 535

Case history
- Prior: On Writs of Certiorari to the Supreme Court of Kansas

Holding
- The Eighth Amendment does not require courts to instruct a jury that mitigating circumstances need not be proved beyond a reasonable doubt. Kansas Supreme Court reversed and remanded.

Court membership
- Chief Justice John Roberts Associate Justices Antonin Scalia · Anthony Kennedy; Clarence Thomas · Ruth Bader Ginsburg; Stephen Breyer · Samuel Alito; Sonia Sotomayor · Elena Kagan

Case opinions
- Majority: Scalia, joined by Roberts, Kennedy, Thomas, Ginsburg, Breyer, Alito, Kagan
- Dissent: Sotomayor

Laws applied
- U.S. Const. amend. VIII

Kansas v. Carr, 577 U.S. 108 (2016), was a case in which the Supreme Court of the United States clarified several procedures for sentencing defendants in capital cases. Specifically, the Court held that judges are not required to affirmatively instruct juries about the burden of proof for establishing mitigating evidence, and that joint trials of capital defendants "are often preferable when the joined defendants’ criminal conduct arises out of a single chain of events". This case included the last majority opinion written by Justice Antonin Scalia before his death in February 2016.

== Background ==
This case involved two separate murder cases that were consolidated on appeal. Sidney Gleason was initially sentenced to death for the alleged murder of a co-conspirator and that co-conspirator's boyfriend to conceal evidence of a robbery. In a separate case, brothers Reginald and Jonathan Carr were jointly sentenced to death for the rape, kidnapping, and murder of five individuals after a crime spree in Wichita, Kansas, that ultimately became known as the Wichita Massacre. In both cases, the Kansas Supreme Court reversed the death sentences; the court ruled that the juries should have been affirmatively instructed that mitigating circumstances need not be proved beyond a reasonable doubt. Additionally, the Kansas Supreme Court ruled that the Carrs should have been tried separately. The Kansas attorney general Derek Schmidt filed an appeal to the United States Supreme Court, which granted certiorari to review the Kansas Supreme Court's rulings.

== Opinion of the Court ==
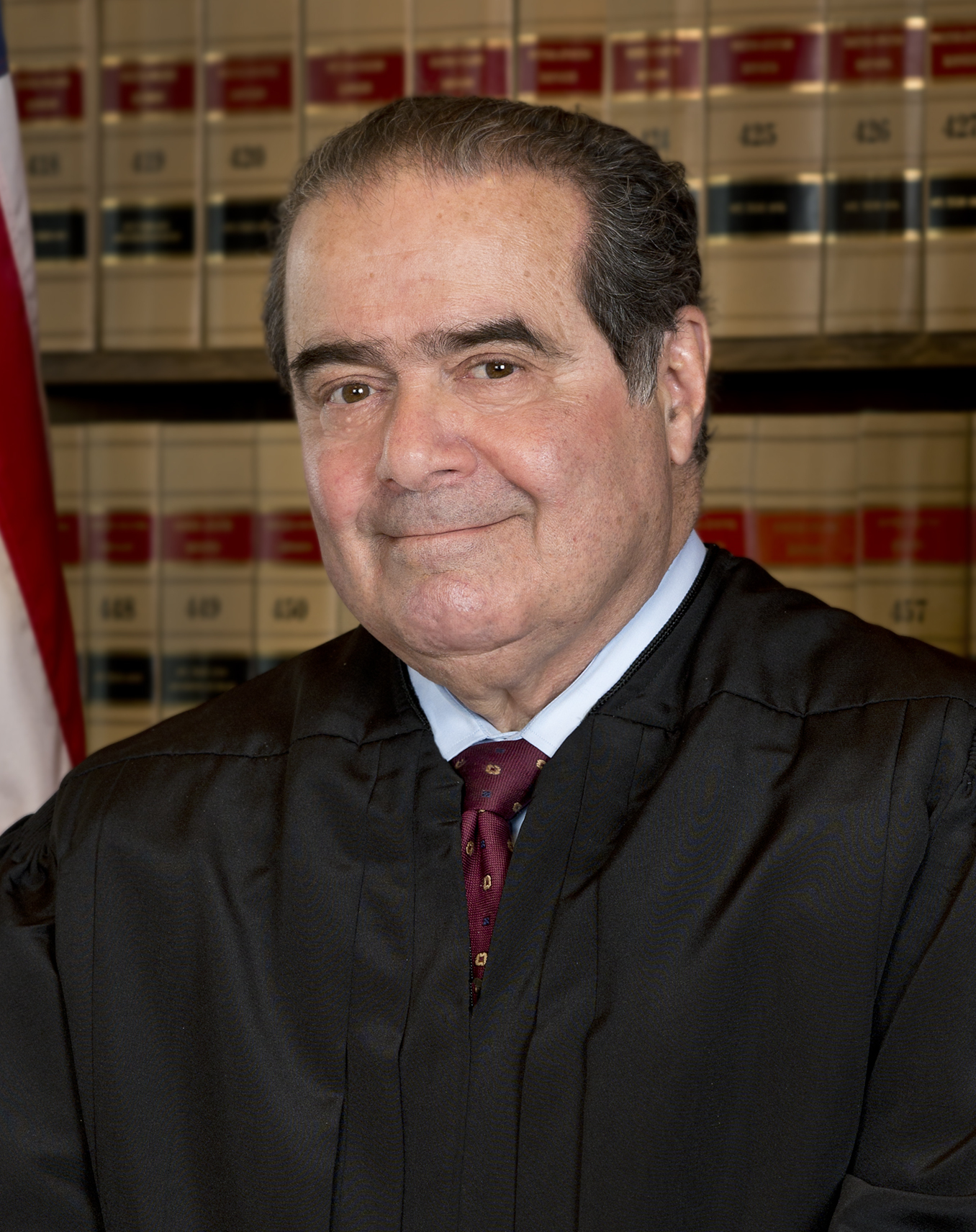
Antonin Scalia, who authored his final majority opinion

Writing for a majority of the Court, Justice Antonin Scalia held that the Eighth Amendment to the United States Constitution does not require courts in capital cases to instruct juries about the burden of proof for establishing mitigating evidence; therefore, the trial courts in this case were under no obligation to inform jurors that "mitigating circumstances need not be proved beyond a reasonable doubt". Because the jury instructions in this case told jurors to "consider any mitigating factor", Justice Scalia concluded that "[j]urors would not have misunderstood these instructions to prevent their consideration of constitutionally relevant evidence". Justice Scalia also concluded that in light of the evidence presented at trial, the joint trial of defendants "did not render the sentencing proceedings fundamentally unfair". Justice Scalia then ordered the case remanded back to the Kansas state court for reconsideration.

=== Justice Sotomayor's dissenting opinion ===
Justice Sonia Sotomayor wrote a dissenting opinion in which she argued that the Supreme Court should not have reviewed these cases because Kansas did not violate any party's constitutional rights. She also expressed concern that the majority's opinion would discourage states from developing techniques for ensuring fair procedures during capital trials. She wrote, "I worry that cases like these prevent States from serving as necessary laboratories for experimenting with how best to guarantee defendants a fair trial". Although Justice Sotomayor admitted that the Supreme Court may want to grant review in "rare cases" in which "a state prosecutor alleges that a State’s highest court has overprotected a criminal defendant", the Court should not have granted certiorari in this case.

== Commentary and analysis ==
Because the majority's analysis focused primarily on procedural issues rather than the "heart of the death penalty", commentators observed that the case "lacked the fireworks that we have come to expect" of death penalty cases. Mark Joseph Stern wrote the 8–1 vote was unexpected in light of Justice Ruth Bader Ginsburg and Justice Stephen Breyer's previous disapproval of capital punishment, and he suggested that "the court’s judgment calls into question optimistic speculation that the end of the death penalty is nigh". Mark Walsh noted that this case was the last majority opinion written by Justice Scalia before his death in February 2016, though his last dissenting opinion was in FERC v. Electric Power Supply Association.

== Affirmation of sentence by Kansas Supreme Court ==
The Kansas Supreme Court affirmed the death penalty for the Carr brothers on January 21, 2022.

== See also ==
- Harmelin v. Michigan (1991)
- List of United States Supreme Court cases
- Lists of United States Supreme Court cases by volume
- List of United States Supreme Court cases by the Roberts Court
