= FERC v. Electric Power Supply Ass'n =

- Supreme Court of the United States

Argued October 14, 2015 Decided January 25, 2016
- Full case name: Federal Energy Regulatory Commission v. Electric Power Supply Association et al.
- Docket no.: 14-840
- Citations: 577 U.S. 260 (more) 136 S. Ct. 760; 193 L. Ed. 2d 661

Case history
- Prior: Elec. Power Supply Ass'n v. FERC, 753 F.3d 216, 410 U.S. App. D.C. 103 (D.C. Cir. 2014)

Court membership
- Chief Justice John Roberts Associate Justices Antonin Scalia · Anthony Kennedy; Clarence Thomas · Ruth Bader Ginsburg; Stephen Breyer · Samuel Alito; Sonia Sotomayor · Elena Kagan

Case opinions
- Majority: Kagan, joined by Roberts, Kennedy, Ginsburg, Breyer, Sotomayor
- Dissent: Scalia, joined by Thomas
- Justice Alito took no part in the consideration or decision of the case.

Laws applied
- Federal Power Act

FERC v. Electric Power Supply Ass'n, 577 U.S. 260 (2016), was a case in which the Supreme Court of the United States held that the Federal Energy Regulatory Commission had the authority to regulate demand response transactions. Justice Scalia's dissenting opinion in this case was the last opinion he wrote before his death in February 2016.

== Background ==
Under the Federal Power Act, the Federal Energy Regulatory Commission (FERC) is allowed to regulate “the sale of electric energy at wholesale in interstate commerce", including any activities that affect the wholesale price of electricity. This case involved a dispute about FERC's attempts to regulate a practice called "demand response". In demand response transactions, wholesale electricity suppliers pay consumers to use less electricity during periods in which electricity is in high demand. In certain circumstances, FERC required suppliers to pay conserving consumers the same price that they would pay electricity producers for generating electricity. A group of electricity suppliers challenged FERC's regulation in court; they claimed that FERC lacked authority to regulate demand response transactions and that even if they did have the power to do so, FERC failed to justify why demand response providers and electricity producers should receive the same compensation.

== Opinion of the Court ==
Writing for a majority of the Court, Justice Elena Kagan ruled that FERC possessed the "requisite statutory power" to regulate demand response transactions and that FERC adequately justified why demand response providers and electricity producers should receive the same compensation. Justice Antonin Scalia wrote a dissenting opinion in which he argued that FERC did not have authority to regulate demand response transactions. This was the last opinion and last dissenting opinion written by Justice Scalia before his death in February 2016, while his last majority opinion was in Kansas v. Carr.

== See also ==
- List of United States Supreme Court cases
- Lists of United States Supreme Court cases by volume
- List of United States Supreme Court cases by the Roberts Court
