= Americold Realty Trust v. ConAgra Foods, Inc. =

- Supreme Court of the United States

Argued January 19, 2016 Decided March 7, 2016
- Full case name: Americold Realty Trust, Petitioner v. ConAgra Foods, Inc., et al.
- Docket no.: 14-1382
- Citations: 577 U.S. ___ (more) 136 S. Ct. 1012; 194 L. Ed. 2d 71
- Opinion announcement: Opinion announcement

Case history
- Prior: ConAgra Foods, Inc. v. Americold Logistics, LLC, 776 F.3d 1175 (10th Cir. 2015); cert. granted, 136 S. Ct. 27 (2015).

Holding
- For the purposes of diversity jurisdiction, the citizenship of a real estate investment trust should be determined by the citizenship of its shareholders when the real estate investment trust is "held and managed for the benefit and profit of any person who may become a shareholder"

Court membership
- Chief Justice John Roberts Associate Justices Anthony Kennedy · Clarence Thomas; Ruth Bader Ginsburg · Stephen Breyer; Samuel Alito · Sonia Sotomayor; Elena Kagan

Case opinion
- Majority: Sotomayor, joined by unanimous

Laws applied
- 28 U.S.C. § 1332

Americold Realty Trust v. ConAgra Foods, Inc., 577 U.S. 378 (2016), was a case in which the Supreme Court of the United States clarified rules for determining whether a federal court may exercise diversity jurisdiction in cases involving unincorporated organizations. The case began as a contract dispute between food producers and a warehouse owner when millions of tons of stored food were destroyed in a warehouse fire. A federal trial court initially ruled in favor of the warehouse owner, but on appeal, the United States Court of Appeals for the Tenth Circuit ruled that the federal district court may not have had jurisdiction. The Tenth Circuit held that the warehouse owner, a real estate investment trust ("REIT"), should be treated as an unincorporated organization and the district court should not be allowed to exercise diversity jurisdiction without examining the citizenship of the members of the real estate investment trust. The warehouse owner appealed to the Supreme Court, which granted certiorari to resolve a circuit split "regarding the citizenship of unincorporated entities."

Writing for a unanimous Court, Justice Sonia Sotomayor held that for the purposes of diversity jurisdiction, the citizenship of a real estate investment trust should be determined by the citizenship of its shareholders when the real estate investment trust is "held and managed for the benefit and profit of any person who may become a shareholder". Although some commentators have suggested that the Court's ruling is "unlikely to have any broad or long-term impact", others have stated that the Court's ruling "means that REITs like Americold will have a much harder time getting (or keeping) their cases in federal court."

== Background ==
=== Federal diversity jurisdiction ===
United States district courts are courts of limited jurisdiction, but a federal statute permits district courts to hear cases when the parties are citizens of different states. This form of jurisdiction is known as "diversity jurisdiction". In the mid-nineteenth century, the Supreme Court has clarified that for the purposes of determining citizenship, a corporation should be considered a citizen of the state in which it is incorporated. Congress later codified this rule in statute and also expanded this definition so that corporations are also considered citizens of the state in which that corporation operates its primary place of business. However, for unincorporated entities, the citizenship of those entities is determined by the citizenship of its members. When individuals own stock in an unincorporated organization, the shareholders function as the "members" of that organization.

=== Initial lawsuit and appeal to the United States Court of Appeals for the Tenth Circuit ===
The case began as a contract dispute that arose when food owned by ConAgra Foods and other corporations was destroyed in a 1991 underground warehouse fire in Kansas City, Kansas. The corporations sued the warehouse's owner, which is now known as Americold Realty Trust, in a state court in Kansas. The case was later removed to the United States District Court for the District of Kansas, and the district court ultimately ruled in favor of Americold. On appeal, the United States Court of Appeals for the Tenth Circuit held that district court did not have jurisdiction to hear the case. The parties argued that the district court could assert diversity jurisdiction in this case because the parties were citizens of different states, but the Tenth Circuit disagreed. The Tenth Circuit held that the citizenship of the corporate plaintiffs should be determined according to "where they were chartered and had their principal places of business", but that Americold (a real estate investment trust) should be considered a citizen of every state in which its shareholders were citizens. (Note: The Tenth Circuit held that the citizenship of a "non-corporate artificial entity" should be determined according to the citizenship of its members or shareholders.) Because there was "no record of the citizenship of Americold’s shareholders", the Tenth Circuit ruled that the parties had failed to prove they were citizens of different states. Americold appealed the Tenth Circuit's ruling, and the Supreme Court of the United States granted certiorari to resolve a circuit split "regarding the citizenship of unincorporated entities."

== Opinion of the Court ==
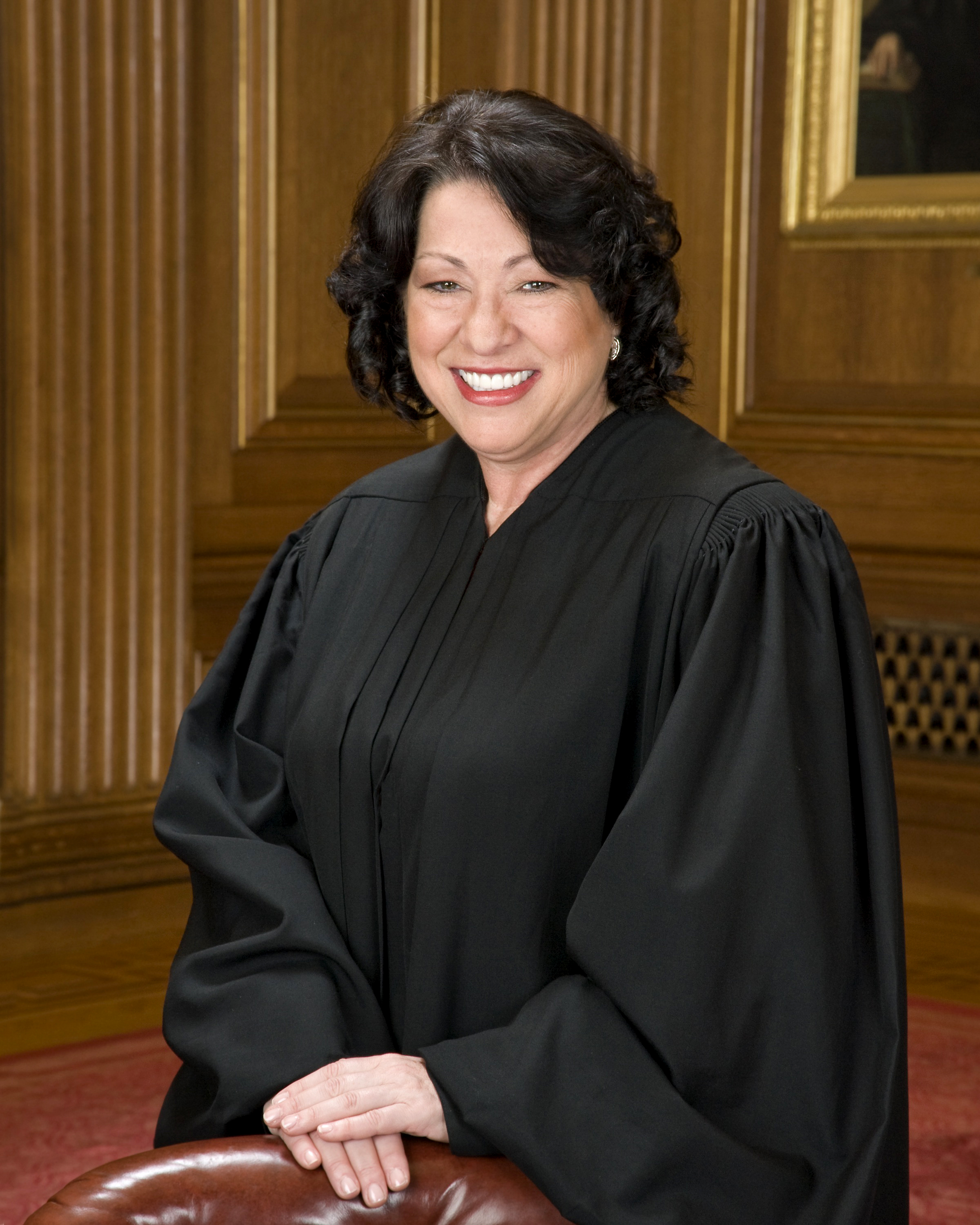
In a unanimous opinion, Justice Sonia Sotomayor declined to remove the "doctrinal wall between corporate and unincorporated entities."

Writing for a unanimous Court, Justice Sonia Sotomayor held that real estate investment trusts, as defined by Maryland law, should be treated like other unincorporated entities when determining diversity jurisdiction. Consequently, Justice Sotomayor ruled that "diversity jurisdiction in a suit by or against the entity depends on the citizenship of all its members." Because Maryland real estate investment trusts are unincorporated organizations "in which property is held and managed for the benefit and profit of any person who may become a shareholder”, Justice Sotomayor explained that shareholders of Maryland real estate investment trusts "appear to be in the same position as the shareholders of a joint-stock company or the partners of a limited partnership — both of whom we viewed as members of their relevant entities." Therefore, for the purposes of determining whether diversity of citizenship exists, Justice Sotomayor held that "Americold’s members include its shareholders."

== Commentary and analysis ==
In his analysis of the case for SCOTUSblog, Ronald Mann wrote that the case "seems most unlikely to have any broad or long-term impact" and that the "most likely fate" of the case "is an occasional appearance in the footnotes of casebooks and treatises on federal courts." Mann also observed that "Chief Justice John Roberts has not yet assigned any major opinions to Sotomayor, and this case leaves that pattern intact." Amy Howe also wrote that the Court's ruling "means that REITs like Americold will have a much harder time getting (or keeping) their cases in federal court."

== See also ==
- List of United States Supreme Court cases
- Lists of United States Supreme Court cases by volume
- List of United States Supreme Court cases by the Roberts Court
