= Americold =

Logistics company for cold chains

Americold Realty Trust, Inc.
- Type: Public company
- Traded as: NYSE: COLD; Russell 1000 component
- Founded: 1903; 123 years ago as Atlanta Ice and Coal Company
- Founder: Ernest Woodruff
- Headquarters: Atlanta, Georgia, U.S.
- Number of locations: 250
- Revenue: ▼US$2.60 billion (2025)
- Net income: ▼ −US$115 million (2025)
- Number of employees: 16,275 (December 31, 2021)
- Website: americold.com

Americold Realty Trust, Inc. is an American temperature controlled warehousing and transportation company based in Atlanta, Georgia, United States. It is in the business of modern commercialized temperature controlled warehousing for the storage of perishable goods via a cold chain, one of the forms of food preservation. Americold is the 2nd largest temperature-controlled warehousing and distribution services provider in the world.

== History ==
Cold storage companies began to appear when food preservation using ice became commercialized. Ice was farmed from lakes during the winter, and stored, surrounded by straw to insulate it, so that it could be used well into early summer. Ice houses and ice warehouses began to appear as part of the ice trade, and blocks of ice were sold for domestic icebox use and for commercial use in cold storage. In the decades of the 1880s through 1910s, mechanical refrigeration and freezing gradually but increasingly displaced natural ice in this trade. Then in 1922, Clarence Birdseye founded the modern frozen food industry, by pioneering fast freezing (now called blast freezing), based on low temperature freezing of fish practiced by Inuit in Arctic regions.

Part of Americold's history

Americold's history began in the early 20th century, around the time of the first ice and coal companies. Americold came from mergers and acquisitions involving Atlanta Ice and Coal Company, Atlanta City Brewing Company (later known as Atlanta Brewing and Ice Company,) Versacold, Munford, Jackson Atlantic, United Refrigerated Services, Atlas Cold Storage, and others.

A member of Atlantic Ice and Coal's truck fleet

In 1903, entrepreneur Ernest Woodruff merged three cold storage warehouses to form Atlanta Ice and Coal Company and in 1909 renamed the company Atlantic Ice and Coal as part of a large consolidation of ice and coal companies throughout the eastern states. In 1919, Woodruff bought the Coca-Cola Company from Asa Candler's children for $25,000,000.

In 1935, Atlantic Ice & Coal Company changed names to Atlantic Company and began to expand into a variety of different businesses, including cold storage and beer production, the latter contributing up to 50% of the company's revenues at its peak.

Atlantic Company diversified into ice convenience store development under the name EZ stores, before household refrigerators were commonplace. It also ran a fast food operation called Wishbone Fried Chicken.

Atlantic Company merged with Munford Do it Yourself stores and became Atlantic-Munford, rapidly developing its convenience store growth.

The company then merged with Jackson Minit Market and Handy Andy, and was renamed Jackson Atlantic, growing to 40 warehouses in the USA. It was one of the largest warehouse networks at that time. The company went public in 1968 and a few years later merged with United Refrigerated Services. The company then set out to develop the USA's most comprehensive cold storage network.

Atlanta became the company's home again in the early 1980s.

Acquisitions and mergers continued during the 1980s and 1990s with the company's current name, Americold, appearing in 1997.

In 2010, Americold acquired Versacold to become the largest temperature-controlled warehousing and distribution services provider in the world.

In 2020, Americold acquired Agromerchants, which is the fourth largest temperature-controlled warehousing company in the world.

In 2025, Americold entered a cooperation agreement with Ancora Holdings Group, an activist investor firm.

== Services ==
Americold provides temperature-controlled warehousing along with consolidation and multi-vendor consolidation transportation programs. Value added services complement typical warehousing and distribution services and include blast freezing, pick and pack, labeling/relabeling, repacking, kitting, staging, cross-dock, sloughing/tempering, plus light assembly and food processing services. Americold owns and operates over 245 temperature-controlled warehouses, with more than 1 billion cubic feet of storage, in the United States, Australia, New Zealand, China, Argentina, and Canada. Americold's warehouses are a part of the supply chain connecting food producers, processors, distributors, and retailers to consumers.

== Organization ==
Americold has more than 245 locations worldwide. It is a publicly traded REIT focused on temperature-controlled warehouses.

Americold owns and operates a quarry in Carthage Underground both for the excavated stone and uses the caverns and refrigerated storage chambers.

== See also ==
- Americold Realty Trust v. ConAgra Foods, Inc.
