= List of United States Supreme Court cases, volume 577 =

This is a list of all the United States Supreme Court cases from volume 577 of the United States Reports:

Case name	Citation	Date decided
Maryland v. Kulbicki	577 U.S. 1	October 5, 2015
A conviction may not be reversed for ineffective assistance of counsel if the claim is based on speculation that a different trial strategy might have produced different results.
Mullenix v. Luna	577 U.S. 7	November 9, 2015
A police officer who shot and killed a fleeing suspect during a police pursuit was entitled to qualified immunity because existing precedent did not establish "beyond debate" that the officer's actions were objectively unreasonable.
OBB Personenverkehr AG v. Sachs	577 U.S. 27	December 1, 2015
Although the plaintiff purchased a rail ticket in the United States, an injury that occurred on a rail platform in Austria was "based upon" conduct that occurred solely in Austria; the plaintiff's suit therefore fell outside the Foreign Sovereign Immunities Act's commercial activity exception
Shapiro v. McManus	577 U.S. 39	December 8, 2015
Federal district courts are required to refer cases to a three-judge panel when plaintiffs challenge the constitutionality of the apportionment of congressional districts.
DIRECTV, Inc. v. Imburgia	577 U.S. 47	December 14, 2015
Because the California Court of Appeal’s interpretation is preempted by the Federal Arbitration Act, that court must enforce the arbitration agreement.
White v. Wheeler	577 U.S. 73	December 14, 2015
The Sixth Circuit unreasonably applied Witherspoon v. Illinois and Wainwright v. Witt, and should have instead applied the Court's interpretations of the Antiterrorism and Effective Death Penalty Act of 1996.
Bruce v. Samuels	577 U.S. 82	January 12, 2016
The Prison Litigation Reform Act of 1995 requires prisoners to pay twenty percent of their prior month's income for each case they file.
Hurst v. Florida	577 U.S. 92	January 12, 2016
Florida's capital sentencing scheme violates the Sixth Amendment in light of Ring v. Arizona.
Kansas v. Carr	577 U.S. 108	January 20, 2016
The Eighth Amendment does not require courts to instruct a jury that mitigating circumstances need not be proved beyond a reasonable doubt.
Montanile v. Board of Trustees of National Elevator Industry Health Benefit Plan	577 U.S. 136	January 20, 2016
ERISA fiduciaries cannot demand payment from a beneficiary's general assets when those assets cannot be traced back to payments from the fiduciary
Campbell-Ewald Co. v. Gomez	577 U.S. 153	January 20, 2016
An unaccepted settlement offer or offer of judgment does not moot a plaintiff’s case, so the District Court retained jurisdiction to adjudicate the complaint.
Duncan v. Owens	577 U.S. 189	January 20, 2016
Dismissed as improvidently granted.
Montgomery v. Louisiana	577 U.S. 190	January 25, 2016
Miller v. Alabama's prohibition on life in prison without the possibility of parole for juvenile homicide offenders is a substantive rule that must be applied retroactively.
Musacchio v. United States	577 U.S. 237	January 25, 2016
1) A sufficiency challenge should be assessed against the elements of the charged crime, not against the elements set forth in an erroneous jury instruction. 2) A defendant cannot successfully raise Section 3282(a)'s statute-of-limitations bar for the first time on appeal.
Menominee Tribe of Wis. v. United States	577 U.S. 250	January 25, 2016
Plaintiff was not entitled to equitable tolling because they did not demonstrate "extraordinary circumstances."
FERC v. Electric Power Supply Ass'n	577 U.S. 260	January 25, 2016
The Federal Energy Regulatory Commission had the authority to regulate demand response transactions.
James v. Boise	577 U.S. 306	January 25, 2016
The Idaho Supreme Court, like any other state or federal court, is bound by the United States Supreme Court's interpretation of federal law.
Amgen Inc. v. Harris	577 U.S. 308	January 25, 2016
The Ninth Circuit did not properly apply the standard established in Fifth Third v. Dudenhoeffer regarding provisions of the Employee Retirement Income Security Act.
Gobeille v. Liberty Mutual Ins. Co.	577 U.S. 312	March 1, 2016
The Vermont law imposed duties that were inconsistent with the central design of ERISA, which is to provide a single uniform national scheme for the administration of ERISA plans without interference from laws of the several states.
Lockhart v. United States	577 U.S. 347	March 1, 2016
The qualifier "involving a minor or ward" in 18 USC §2258(b)(2) applies only to the final item of the series, not the whole series. Lockhart's 10 year minimum sentence is thus valid under the statute.
Americold Realty Trust v. ConAgra Foods, Inc.	577 U.S. 378	March 7, 2016
For the purposes of diversity jurisdiction, the citizenship of a real estate investment trust should be determined by the citizenship of its shareholders when the real estate investment trust is "held and managed for the benefit and profit of any person who may become a shareholder."
Wearry v. Cain	577 U.S. 385	March 7, 2016
Louisiana prosecutors violated Michael Wearry's due process rights when they failed to disclose evidence supporting his innocence in a murder case.
V.L. v. E.L.	577 U.S. 464	March 7, 2016
Under the Full Faith and Credit Clause, the State of Alabama must recognize the adoption decree granted by a Georgia state court in 2007, regardless of how that court came to its conclusion granting the decree. Supreme Court of Alabama reversed and remanded.
Caetano v. Massachusetts	577 U.S. 411	March 21, 2016
The Supreme Judicial Court of Massachusetts' erred in upholding a law that prohibited the possession of stun guns
Montana v. Wyoming	577 U.S. 423	March 21, 2016
Findings of liability in a dispute over the Yellowstone River Compact.
Sturgeon v. Frost I	577 U.S. 424	March 22, 2016
The National Park Service may regulate only "public" lands in Alaska and remanded the case to the Ninth Circuit Appeals Court to decide whether the river in question, which is "submerged land," is "public" or "non-public" land.
Tyson Foods, Inc. v. Bouaphakeo	577 U.S. 442	March 22, 2016
The district court did not err in certifying and maintaining a class of employees who allege that the employer’s failure to pay them for donning and doffing protective gear violate the Fair Labor Standards Act, notwithstanding the employees’ reliance on “representative evidence” to determine the number of additional hours that each employee worked, when the employer had failed to keep adequate records.
Nebraska v. Parker	577 U.S. 481	March 22, 2016
Congress's 1882 Act did not diminish the Omaha Indian Reservation. The disputed land is within the reservation's boundaries.
Hawkins v. Community Bank	577 U.S. 495	March 22, 2016
Affirmed by an equally divided court.
