= Callan Castle =

Callan Castle may refer to:

- Callan Castle (Atlanta), in Inman Park, Atlanta, U.S.
- Callan Castle, a fictional location in Thomas & Friends

== See also ==
- Callan, County Kilkenny, Ireland
