= St. Hilda's Inman Park =

- St. Hilda of Whitby Anglican Catholic Church
- St. Hilda's Inman Park
- 33°45′55.6″N 84°21′17.0″W
- Location: Inman Park, Georgia
- Address: 414 North Highland Avenue Northeast, Atlanta, GA 30307, United States
- Denomination: Anglican Catholic Church
- Churchmanship: Anglo-Catholic
- Website: https://www.sthildasatl.com/

History
- Consecrated: 1979

Administration
- Diocese: Diocese of the South

Clergy
- Priest(s): Creighton McElveen, SSC

St. Hilda's Inman Park, in a neighborhood of Atlanta, Georgia, is a parish of the Diocese of the South in the Anglican Catholic Church. The building was originally built in 1939 as a Primitive Baptist Church. It was converted to be a parish of the newly formed Anglican Catholic Church in 1978, and was consecrated in 1979.

When Rev. Frederick Hoger was Rector, until his death in 1999, the parish established a men's shelter and a soup kitchen for the local community in Little Five Points.

In 2000, Rev. John Roddy became the pastor. At that time, the neighborhood gentrified. While previously the parish had had a strong ministry to the homeless, who slept in the pews and ate in the parish hall, the neighborhood changed to that of largely young professionals.

In 2023, the Anglican Catholic Church through the Saint Paul Mission Society targeted St. Hilda's for domestic parish revitalization. Rev. Creighton McElveen, SSC, was appointed Priest-in-Charge after the retirement of Rev. Terrence Hall. Rev. McElveen is also a co-host of the podcast, The Sacramentalists.
