= General Pipe and Foundry Company =

Coordinates: 33.7625°N 84.3595°W

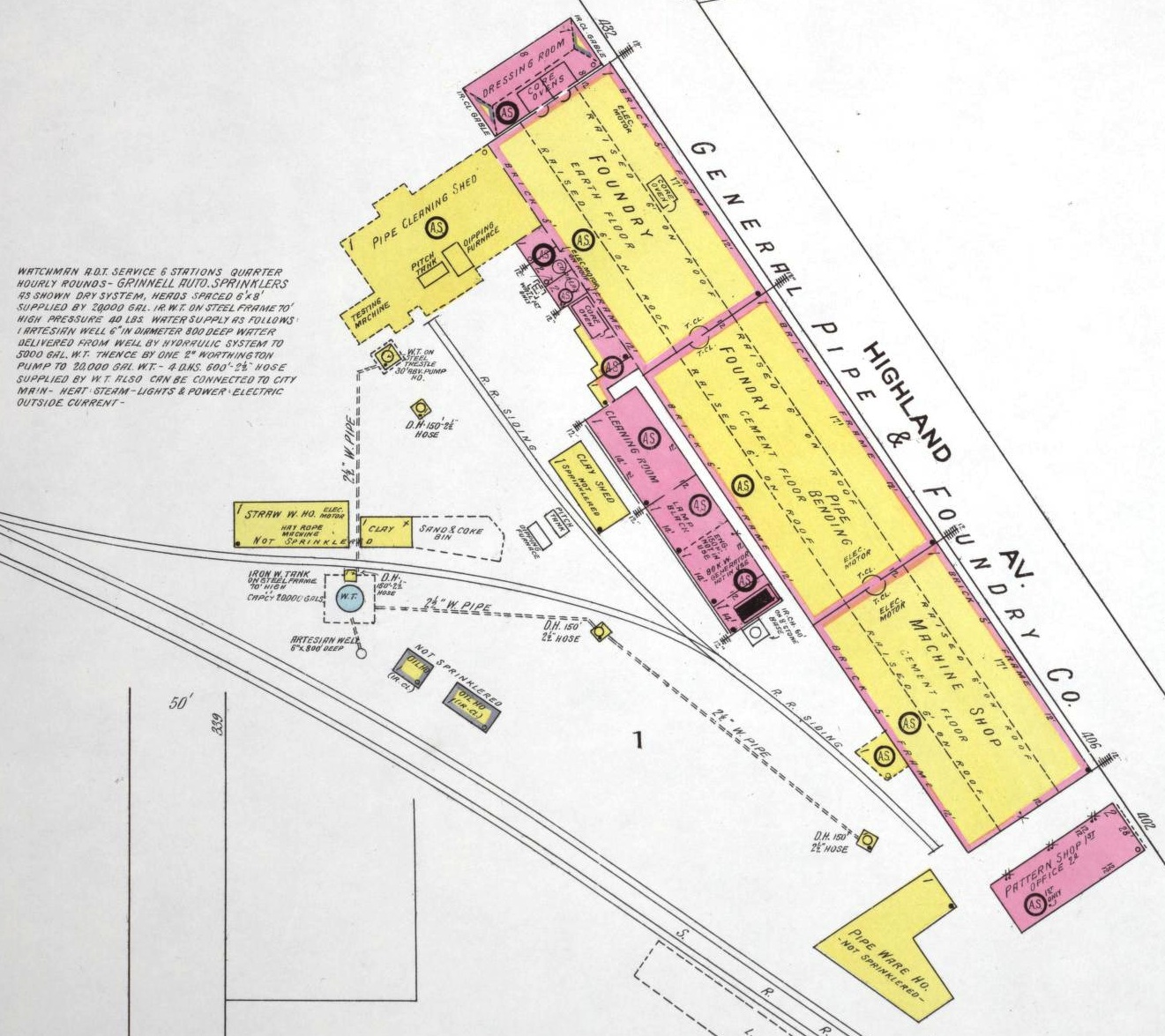
Sanborn Fire Map of General Pipe and Foundry complex, Atlanta, 1911

The General Pipe and Foundry Company foundry and machine shop was located on the north side of Highland Avenue between Elizabeth Street and the BeltLine in Inman Park, Atlanta, Georgia. Coca-Cola executive Robert W. Woodruff worked here when he was 19 years old.

The land on which the complex once sat is now the N. Highland Steel apartment and retail complex. The only original building remaining is the pattern shop which now houses Parish restaurant.
