= Caetano v. Massachusetts =

Jaime Caetano v. Massachusetts
- Supreme Court of the United States

Decided March 21, 2016
- Full case name: Jaime Caetano v. Massachusetts
- Docket no.: 14-10078
- Citations: 577 U.S. 411 (more) 136 S. Ct. 1027; 194 L. Ed. 2d 99; 2016 U.S. LEXIS 1862
- Opinion announcement: Opinion announcement

Case history
- Prior: On Petition for Writ of Certiorari to the Supreme Judicial Court of Massachusetts
- Procedural: Motion to dismiss denied, sub nom. Commonwealth v. Caetano, No. 1149-CR-2522 (Mass. Dist. Ct. April 29, 2013); defendant convicted, No. 1149-CR-2522, Mass. Dist. Ct.; aff'd, 26 N. E. 3d 688 (Mass. 2015)

Holding
- The Supreme Judicial Court of Massachusetts' erred in upholding a law that prohibited the possession of stun guns

Court membership
- Chief Justice John Roberts Associate Justices Anthony Kennedy · Clarence Thomas; Ruth Bader Ginsburg · Stephen Breyer; Samuel Alito · Sonia Sotomayor; Elena Kagan

Case opinions
- Per curiam
- Concurrence: Alito (in judgment), joined by Thomas

Laws applied
- U.S. Const. amend. II; Mass. Gen. Laws, ch. 140, §131J (2014)

Caetano v. Massachusetts, 577 U.S. 411 (2016), was a case in which the Supreme Court of the United States unanimously vacated a Massachusetts conviction of a woman who carried a stun gun for self-defense.

== Background ==
Jaime Caetano was reported to have been hospitalized and "in fear for [her] life" after an altercation with her "abusive" boyfriend. After obtaining several restraining orders that "proved futile", Caetano accepted a stun gun from a friend for self-defense. One night, when her ex-boyfriend confronted her outside her work and threatened her, she displayed the stun gun and successfully avoided an altercation. However, when police discovered that she was in possession of the stun gun, she was arrested, tried, and convicted under a Massachusetts law that outlawed the possession of stun guns. The Massachusetts Supreme Judicial Court had said her stun gun was "not the type of weapon that is eligible for Second Amendment protection" because it was "not in common use at the time of [the Second Amendment's] enactment." Caetano then appealed the Massachusetts court's ruling to the Supreme Court of the United States.

== Opinion of the Court ==
In a per curiam decision, the Supreme Court vacated the ruling of the Massachusetts Supreme Judicial Court. Citing District of Columbia v. Heller and McDonald v. City of Chicago, the Court began its opinion by stating that "the Second Amendment extends, prima facie, to all instruments that constitute bearable arms, even those that were not in existence at the time of the founding" and that "the Second Amendment right is fully applicable to the States". The term "bearable arms" was defined in District of Columbia v. Heller, 554 U.S. 570 (2008) and includes any ""[w]eapo[n] of offence" or "thing that a man wears for his defence, or takes into his hands," that is "carr[ied] . . . for the purpose of offensive or defensive action." 554 U. S., at 581, 584 (internal quotation marks omitted)."

The Court then identified three reasons why the Massachusetts court's opinion contradicted prior rulings by the United States Supreme Court. First, the Massachusetts court said that stun guns could be banned because they "were not in common use at the time of the Second Amendment's enactment", but the Supreme Court noted that this contradicted Heller's conclusion that Second Amendment protects "arms ... that were not in existence at the time of the founding". Second, the Massachusetts court said that stun guns were "dangerous per se at common law and unusual" because they were "a thoroughly modern invention", but the Supreme Court held that this was also inconsistent with Heller. Third, the Massachusetts court said that stun guns could be banned because they were not "readily adaptable to use in the military", but the Supreme Court held that Heller rejected the argument that "only those weapons useful in warfare" were protected by the Second Amendment.

=== Justice Alito's concurring opinion ===
Justice Samuel Alito wrote an opinion concurring in the judgment, in which he was joined by Justice Clarence Thomas. Justice Alito characterized the per curiam decision as "grudging" and wrote that "[t]he reasoning of the Massachusetts court poses a grave threat to the fundamental right of self-defense". He provided an analysis of why he believed that the Massachusetts court's ruling contradicted Heller and other cases interpreting the Second Amendment. After concluding that the Massachusetts stun gun ban violates the Second Amendment, Justice Alito wrote: "if the fundamental right of self-defense does not protect Caetano, then the safety of all Americans is left to the mercy of state authorities who may be more concerned about disarming people than about keeping them safe".

== Subsequent developments ==
On July 6, 2016, after the prosecution and defense reached an agreement, Caetano was found not guilty by a Massachusetts judge.

In a subsequent case, Ramirez v. Commonwealth, the Massachusetts Supreme Judicial Court relied on Caetano to strike down the state's stun gun law.

== Commentary and analysis ==
Lyle Denniston observed that the Court's opinion was the first direct interpretation of the meaning of the Second Amendment since the Court's 2008 ruling in Heller. However, given the limited nature of the per curiam opinion, Denniston noted that "[t]he facts in this case do not necessarily stand as a definite constitutional declaration".

== See also ==
- List of United States Supreme Court cases
- Lists of United States Supreme Court cases by volume
- List of United States Supreme Court cases by the Roberts Court
