= Robert Winship =

Atlanta businessman

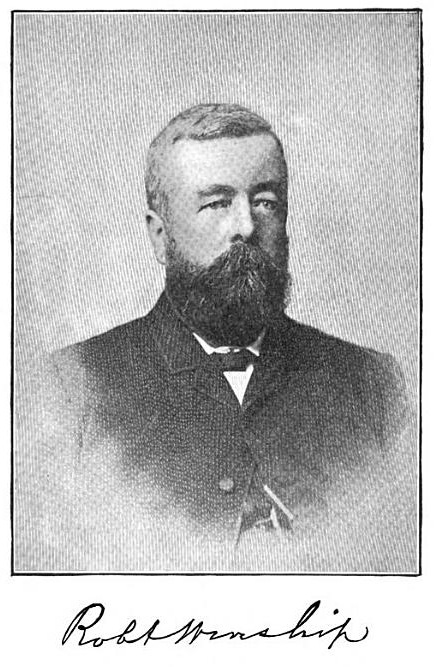
Robert Winship (1834-1899)

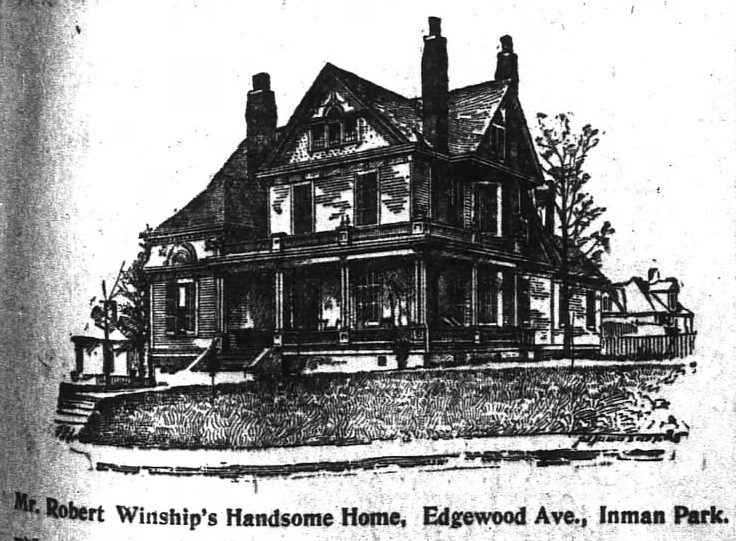
Winship mansion in Inman Park, 1896

Robert Winship (September 27, 1834 in Forsyth, Georgia – September 8, 1899) was a prominent 19th century Atlanta businessman who built his fortune on the Winship Machine Company, originally built up by his father. Foundry Street in the Luckie Marietta district of Downtown Atlanta is named for Winship's foundry.

Winship had his mansion in the Inman Park neighborhood of Atlanta.

His daughter, Emily Carolyn Winship, would marry prominent businessman Ernest Woodruff. Winship's grandson, Robert Winship Woodruff, after whom Downtown Atlanta's Woodruff Park is named, would run The Coca-Cola Company.
