= Phil Haralson =

American lawyer

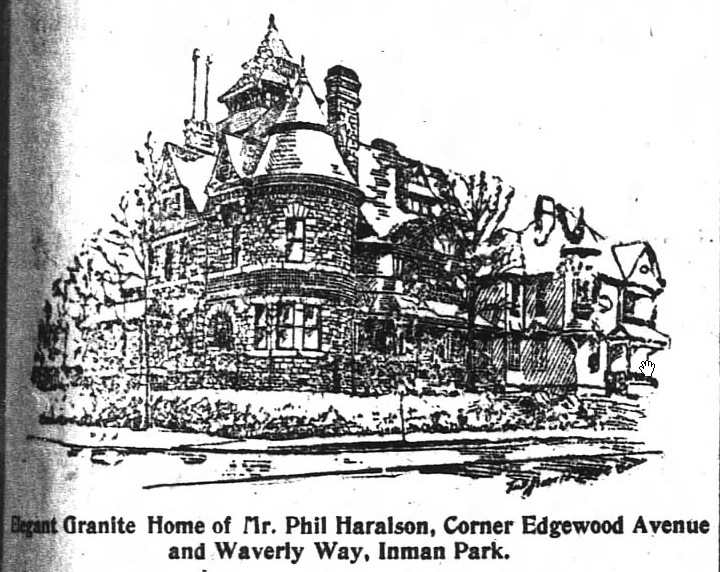
Haralson mansion in Inman Park, 1896

Philip H. Haralson (November 3, 1851, Macon, Georgia - March 1934, Atlanta) was an American lawyer. At one time he headed up the Committee on Manufactures and Statistics. and at another went into real estate investment in Cuba. He married Mary E. Morris in 1881. Haralson had his mansion in the Inman Park neighborhood of Atlanta. He was buried in Oakland Cemetery.
