= Krog Street Market =

Mixed-use development in Atlanta, Georgia

Coordinates: 33.7567°N 84.3641°W

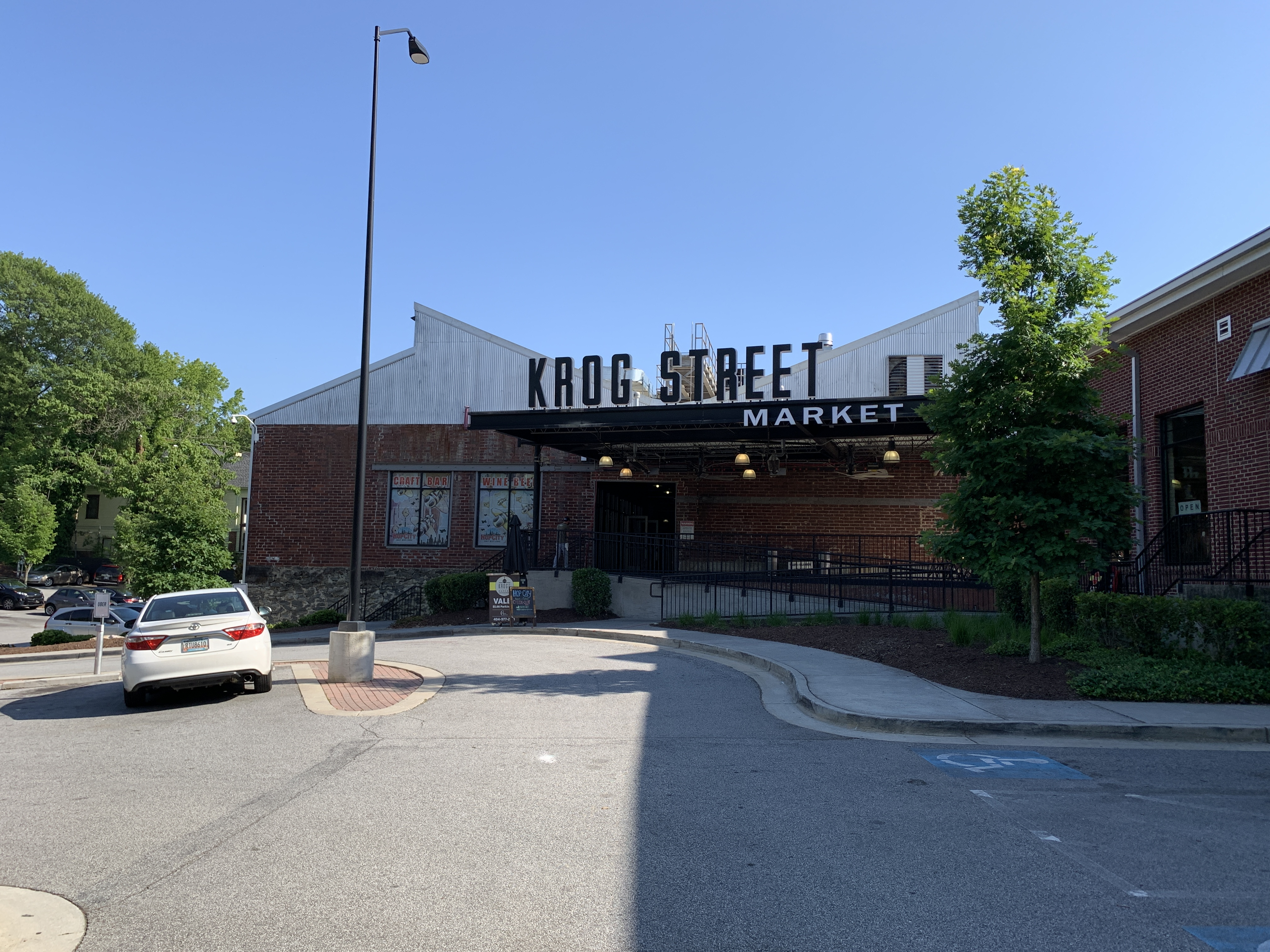
Krog Street Market

Krog Street Market is a 9-acre (3.6 ha) mixed-use development in Atlanta, located along the Eastside Beltline trail at Edgewood Avenue in Inman Park which opened in Summer 2014. The complex is centered on a 30,000-square-foot (2,800 m^{2}), west coast-style food hall with various vendor stalls, five full-service restaurants and three larger traditional retail spaces. The development of the food hall portion began in 2013 and opened in November 2014. The overall project incorporated two parcels on either side of Krog Street: The Stove Works at 112 Krog Street (west side) and the former Tyler Perry Studios at 99 Krog Street (east side). The conversion of the 99 Krog Street building to Krog Street Market cost $11 million at the time (not including The Stove Works, which remained largely unaltered at the time. The locally famous bridge (originally built for forklifts) was incorporated as part of the complex.

== Site history ==
The Atlanta Stove Works, a former pot-belly stove and iron-pan factory opened in 1889, and flourished in the 1920s when it began exporting the 32 BOX stove that sparked industrial demand and expansion. Among other products it produced skillets and wrought-iron furniture. The logo for Krog Street Market is a skillet because of this history After decades of decline, the company ceased operations in 1988. In the late 1990s the west side of the complex was transformed into the mixed-use Atlanta Stove Works development of offices, Rathbun's restaurant (opened on site in 2004) and the Krog Bar.

The former truck storage building built in the late 1920s on the east side (99 Krog Street) was converted into the first film studio ever for Tyler Perry Studios, now located on 330 acres at the former Fort McPherson in southwest Atlanta. Tyler had purchased 99 Krog Street from Atlanta Stage Works in 2006 for a reported $7 million. The company then sold it to developers in late 2012.
