= Carthage Underground =

Mine in the United States of America

Coordinates: 37.192390°N 94.325395°W

The Carthage Underground is a collection of marble quarries in Carthage, Missouri, most of which is owned by Americold. Americold holds 43,000,000 square feet (4,000,000 m^{2}) of the quarry, much of which is occupied by warehouses or factories, primarily for food storage.It is frequently visited by urban explorers due to the decrepit abandoned quarries mixed seamlessly with working underground factories and warehouses. Many of the local industries rely heavily upon the facilities to store foodstuffs there. It is also oddly present with an ecosystem of its own, with underground lakes hosting turtles, fish and various other species. This could be seen as remarkable given that the quarries were utterly devoid of life before the mining industry.

The temperature of the underground is frequently quoted as 60 °F (16 °C) year round, though artificial refrigeration has altered the temperature to a range of -30 to 100 °F (38 °C).

Urban explorers should be extremely cautious exploring the undergrounds—the great amount of them are uninhabited and/or flooded, and wildlife is not rare there. Americold has a policy against photographs. Unauthorized trespassing in their share of the underground can result in criminal prosecution, and the mostly uncharted abandoned areas are dangerous at best.
