= Ernest Woodruff =

American businessman (1863–1944)

- Born: May 23, 1863; Columbus, Georgia, US
- Died: June 5, 1944 (aged 81)
- Occupation: Businessman
- Children: Robert, Ernest, George and Henry
- Family: Joel Hurt (brother-in-law)

Ernest Woodruff (May 23, 1863 – June 5, 1944), sometimes erroneously Earnest, was an American businessman from Atlanta, Georgia.

== Early life and marriage ==
Woodruff was born in Columbus, Georgia. After relocating to Atlanta, he made his home in the Inman Park suburb, developed by his brother-in-law Joel Hurt.

On April 22, 1885, Woodruff married Emily Caroline Winship, child of foundry magnate Robert Winship.

== Career ==
With his brother-in-law Joel Hurt, Woodruff founded the Atlanta and Edgewood Street Railroad, which ran its first electric trolleys on April 22, 1889. Woodruff followed Hurt as president of the Trust Company in 1904; he held this post for 18 years before becoming chairman of the board.

Woodruff's greatest skill was in re-organizing existing companies to improve value by increased scale:

In 1903, he combined three small ice and coal companies into the Atlanta Ice and Coal Company, which went on to become Americold.

In 1910, with the help of the Trust Company, he organized ice and coal companies from Virginia and throughout the Carolinas into Atlantic Ice and Coal. With high costs of home and office deliveries, none of these companies were able to make much money on their own, but combined they made handsome returns to shareholders.

Woodruff then restructured the Atlantic Steel factory (current site of Atlantic Station) and installed Thomas Glenn to get it out of debt. The restructuring of Atlantic Steel would set the table for the biggest move of Woodruff's career: the takeover of The Coca-Cola Company in 1919, which he negotiated with Asa Griggs Candler. Ernest Woodruff's sons, Robert W. Woodruff and George W. Woodruff, would run Coca-Cola for many years, leaving Asa Candler's son Howard Candler out of the picture.

Preceded by Joel Hurt	President of Trust Company of Georgia; 1904 – 1922	Succeeded by Tom Glenn
