= Musacchio v. United States =

- Supreme Court of the United States

Argued November 30, 2015 Decided January 25, 2016
- Full case name: Michael Musacchio, Petitioner v. United States
- Docket no.: 14-1095
- Citations: 577 U.S. ___ (more) 136 S. Ct. 709; 193 L. Ed. 2d 639

Case history
- Prior: On Writ of Certiorari to the United States Court of Appeals for the Fifth Circuit

Holding
- 1) A sufficiency challenge should be assessed against the elements of the charged crime, not against the elements set forth in an erroneous jury instruction. 2) A defendant cannot successfully raise Section 3282(a)'s statute-of-limitations bar for the first time on appeal.

Court membership
- Chief Justice John Roberts Associate Justices Antonin Scalia · Anthony Kennedy; Clarence Thomas · Ruth Bader Ginsburg; Stephen Breyer · Samuel Alito; Sonia Sotomayor · Elena Kagan

Case opinion
- Majority: Thomas, joined by unanimous

Musacchio v. United States, 577 U.S. ___ (2016), was a case in which the Supreme Court of the United States clarified procedures for appellate review when the government does not object to an erroneous jury instruction that adds elements to a criminal offense as well as whether a defendant may raise a statute of limitations defense for the first time on appeal. In a unanimous opinion written by Justice Clarence Thomas, the Court held that when reviewing a claim that the government failed to demonstrate sufficient evidence to substantiate a criminal offense, an appellate court should assess the elements of the alleged crime, rather than the elements that were described in jury instructions.

== Background ==
Michael Musacchio resigned as president of Exel Transportation Services (ETS) in 2004, but with help from the former head of ETS's information-technology department, he accessed ETS's computer system without ETS's authorization through early 2006. In November 2010, Musacchio was indicted under a federal law that makes it a crime if a person "intentionally accesses a computer without authorization or exceeds authorized access" and thereby "obtains... information from any protected computer." He was charged in count 1 with conspiring to commit both types of improper access and in count 23 with making unauthorized access "[o]n or about" November 24, 2005. In a 2012 superseding indictment, count 1 dropped the charge of conspiracy to exceed authorized access, and count 2 changed count 23's date to "[o]n or about" November 23–25, 2005. Musacchio never argued in the trial court that his prosecution violated the 5-year statute of limitations applicable to count 2. At trial, the government did not object when the federal district court instructed the jury that that the law "makes it a crime... to intentionally access a computer without authorization and exceed authorized access," even though the conjunction "and" added an additional element. The jury found Musacchio guilty on counts 1 and 2. On appeal, he challenged the sufficiency of the evidence supporting his conspiracy conviction and argued, for the first time, that his prosecution on count 2 was barred by the statute of limitations. In affirming his conviction, the Fifth Circuit Court of Appeals assessed Musacchio's sufficiency challenge against the charged elements of the conspiracy count rather than against the heightened jury instruction, and it concluded that he had waived his statute-of-limitations defense by failing to raise it at trial.

== Opinion of the Court ==
Justice Clarence Thomas explained that "[a] reviewing court's limited determination on sufficiency review ... does not rest on how the jury was instructed." Additionally, with respect to the statute of limitations issue, Justice Thomas held that a statute of limitations defense cannot be raised for the first time on appeal.

== Subsequent developments ==
In 2017, the Washington Supreme Court addressed whether the Musacchio decision overruled the state's longstanding "law of the case" doctrine, which binds the parties to use jury instructions that they did not object to before the instructions were sent to the jury even if those instructions include unnecessary elements. The court held that the law of the case doctrine did not rely on federal due process principles and upheld the doctrine as both descended from the common law and well-respected under the Washington Constitution.
