= Inman Park =

Historic district on the east side of Atlanta, Georgia, United States

- Inman Park Historic District
- U.S. National Register of Historic Places
- U.S. Historic district
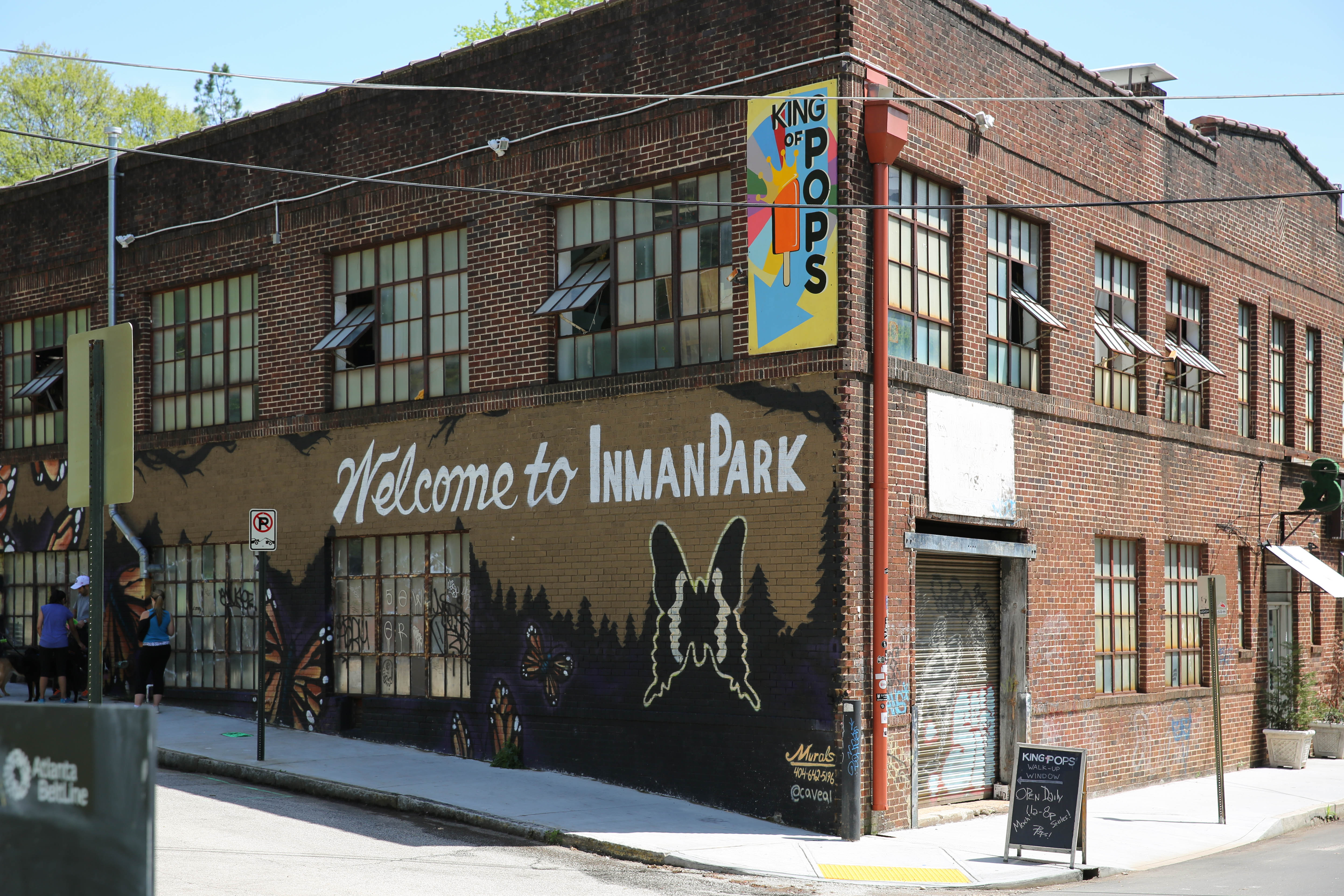
- Welcome Sign in Inman Park

- Location within Atlanta Location within Georgia Location within the United States
- Location: Roughly bounded by Freedom Parkway, DeKalb and Lake Aves. (original) and Roughly bounded by Lake, Hurt, and DeKalb Aves., and Krog St. (increase), Atlanta, Georgia
- Coordinates: 33°45′20″N 84°21′34″W
- Built: 1889
- Architect: Multiple
- Architectural style: Queen Anne, Shingle Style (original); Queen Anne, Stick/Eastlake, Colonial Revival, Shotgun, Bungalow, Arts & Crafts, Romanesque Revival, Prairie Style, Arts & Crafts Revival, et al. (increase)
- NRHP reference No.: 73000621 and 01000973
- Added to NRHP: July 23, 1973 (original); September 16, 2001 (increase)

Inman Park is an intown neighborhood on the east side of Atlanta, Georgia, and its first planned suburb. It was named for Samuel M. Inman.

== History ==
Today's neighborhood of Inman Park includes areas that were originally designated:

- Inman Park proper (today the Inman Park Historic District)
- Moreland Park (today the Inman Park-Moreland Historic District)
- part of Copenhill Park (properties on Atlantis, the south side of Highland, and the north sides of Sinclair and a block of Austin)
- former industrial areas on the western side, now mixed-use developments including Inman Park Village and North Highland Steel

The area was part of the battlefield in the Battle of Atlanta in 1864.

=== Atlanta's first streetcar suburb ===
Inman Park (proper) was planned in the late 1880s by Joel Hurt, a civil engineer and real-estate developer who intended to create a rural oasis connected to the city by the first of Atlanta's electric streetcar lines, along Edgewood Avenue. The East Atlanta Land Company acquired and developed more than 130 acres east of the city and Hurt named the new suburb for his friend and business associate, Samuel M. Inman. Joseph Forsyth Johnson was hired as landscape designer for Inman Park who included curvilinear street designs and liberal usage of open spaces in his planning.

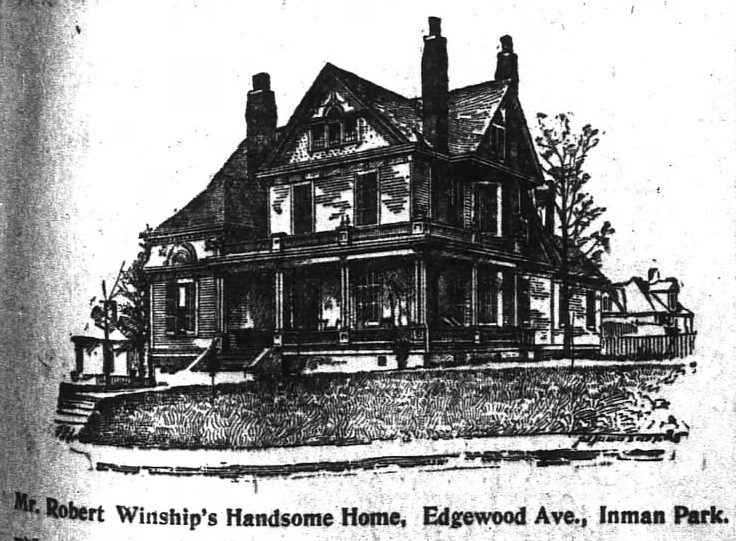
Robert Winship home, 1896

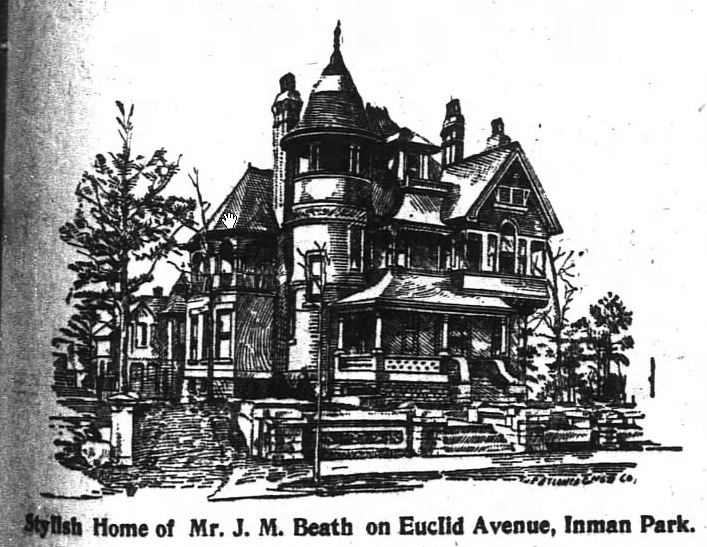
Beath-Dickey House, 1896

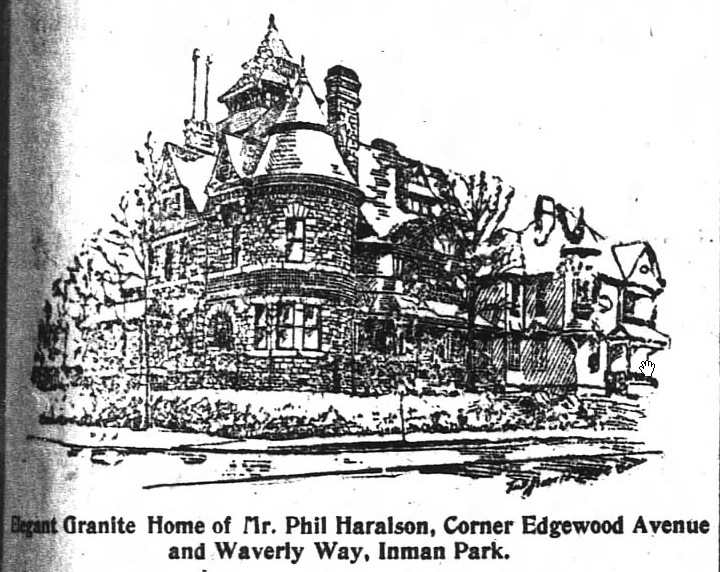
Phil Haralson home, 1896

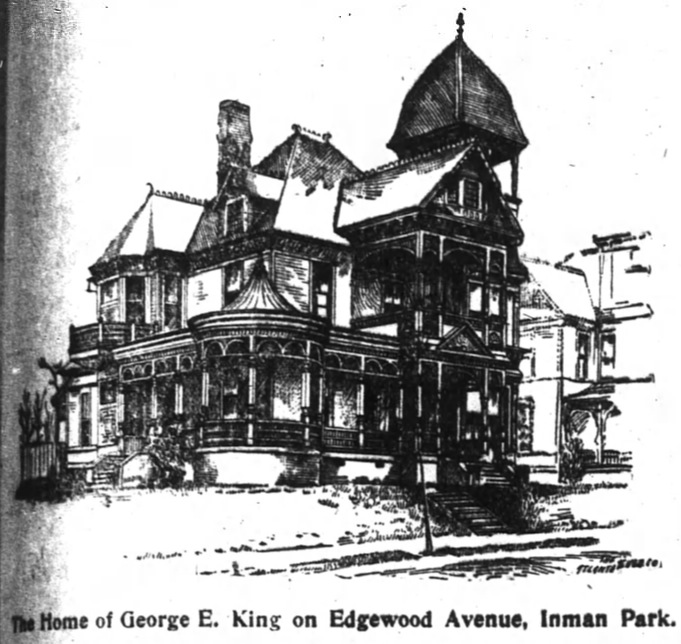
George Edward King home, 1896

The Atlanta Constitution in 1896 grandly described Inman Park:

High up above the city, where the purest breezes and the brightest sunshine drove away the germs of disease, and where nature had lavished her best gifts, the gentlemen who conceived the thought of Inman Park found the locality above all others which they desired. It was to be a place of homes, of pretty homes, green lawns, and desirable inhabitants. And all save those who would make desirable residents have been excluded. ... It's the prettiest, highest, healthiest and most desirable locality I ever saw. Everybody is friendly and neighborly. ... And as far as accessibility it ranks second to no residence portion of the city. We have three car lines and frequent schedules.

Like new developments throughout the United States at the time, but in stark contrast to the attitudes prevalent in the neighborhood today, Inman Park was conceived of and promoted as a segregated community.

Moreland Park was by contrast developed as a more traditional, incremental building of sub-divisions as opposed to the grand plan for Inman Park proper.

=== Decline ===
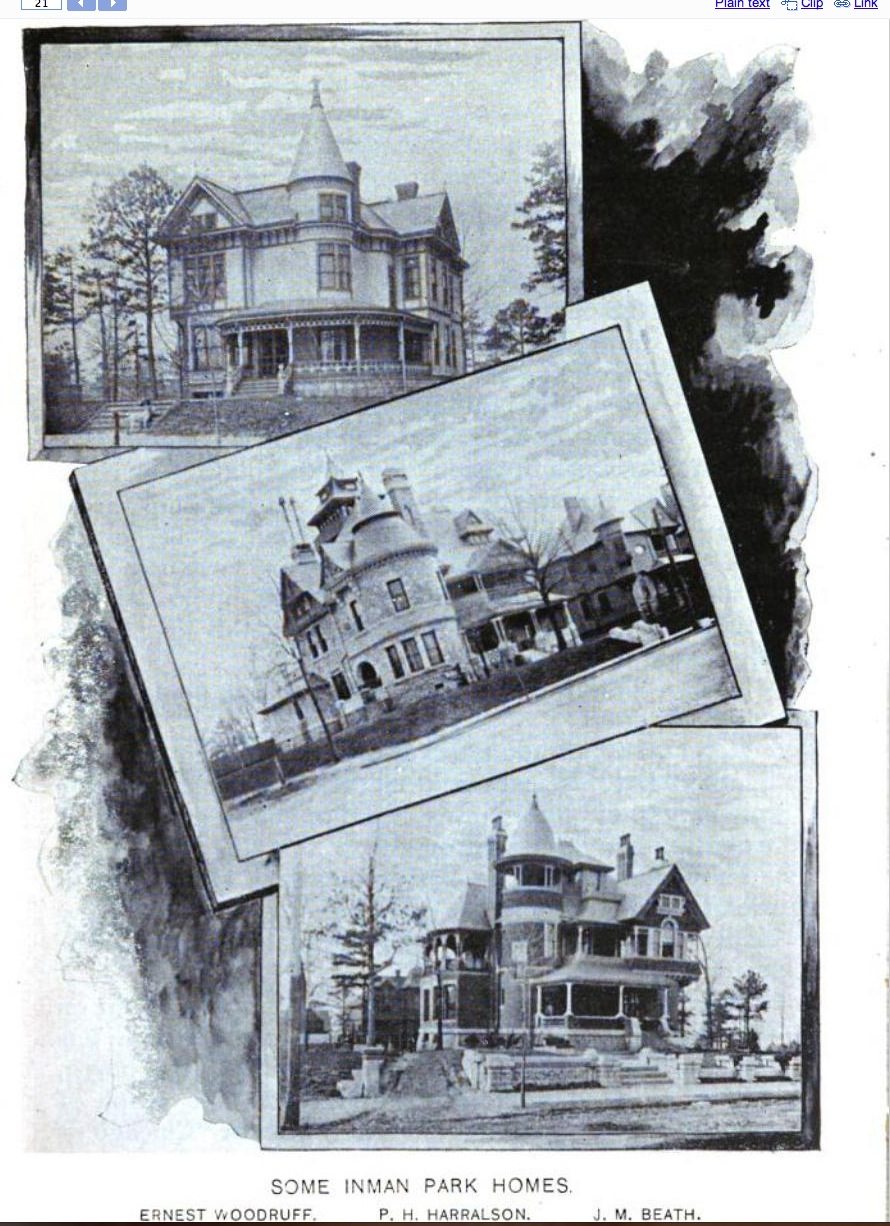
Sketches of three Inman Park houses, 1895; Ernest Woodruff's house at top; Beath-Dickey House at bottom

The arrival of the automobile allowed upper class Atlantans to live in suburbs farther north from downtown workplaces, such as Morningside and what is now considered Buckhead. Inman Park became less fashionable and the exuberant Victorian architecture came to seem dated. The mansions came to be subdivided into apartments.

Similar to other intown neighborhoods such as Virginia Highland, Inman Park fell to blight during the white middle and upper class exodus to the northern suburbs in the 1950s and 1960s, and was:

an economically depressed neighborhood of mostly blue-collar white folks, elderly couples who could not afford to move out and families on disability and welfare. They lived in rented bungalows or big houses chopped up into tiny roach-infested apartments.

=== Atlanta's first intown neighborhood to gentrify ===
Driving through the neighborhood on his way to appraise stained glass windows in the home of Judge Durwood T. Pye on Poplar Circle, Robert Griggs was smitten by the architecture of the Beath-Dickey House, then a dilapidated multi-unit rental property. He and his partner, Robert Aiken, bought the house and restored it to a single-family dwelling. They were followed by others who restored homes; founded Inman Park Restoration, the neighborhood association; and created a neighborhood newsletter, a garden club to rehabilitate public spaces, and a pre-school. To publicize the progress they were making, they began a Tour of Homes with a small festival, which has grown into the Inman Park Festival, held each spring.

=== Freeway revolt against I-485 ===
During this same period, there was an intense fight against the I-485 freeway which was to be built through the neighborhood, although many properties in Inman Park, as well as the entire neighboring neighborhood of Copenhill, were torn down in preparation for freeway construction.

=== Inman Park today ===
After decades of restoration and renewal, Inman Park is now regarded as a highly desirable intown neighborhood with a mixture of rental and owner-occupied houses and condominiums. Built up as it was over decades, the neighborhood housing now ranges from tiny mill town shotguns to the Victorian mansions of the original development, intermixed with bungalows of all sizes built during the first three decades of the 20th century. Like its housing, the makeup of Inman Park has changed since its inception, with a population that is 25% non-white and of varying economic levels—although increasing housing prices are beginning to force more economic homogeneity. Since the beginning of its renewal, inclusivity and a strong sense of community have distinguished Inman Park. The neighborhood association has always welcomed renters and homeowners alike, with nominal annual dues, while the Inman Park Festival, which attracts tens of thousands of visitors every spring, brings residents together to produce the largest all-volunteer festival in Georgia. The Festival's centerpiece is the Tour of Homes, which showcases the wide variety of sizes and types of residences in the neighborhood.

Former industrial areas on the west side of the neighborhood have been redeveloped into mixed-use complexes. The former General Pipe and Foundry site is now North Highland Steel and the Mead paper plant site is now Inman Park Village. In the early 1990s the former Atlanta Stove Works was transformed by swapping out two letters of its name and became the Atlanta Stage Works, a film and media production center that eventually housed the early Tyler Perry film studios and the National AIDS Quilt. In 2015 it was converted into a mixed-use office and restaurant space, to be added to the space across Krog Street to form the Krog Street Market.

== Geography ==
Inman Park is bordered by:

- the BeltLine Eastside Trail on the west, across which lies the Old Fourth Ward
- Freedom Parkway on the north, across which lies Poncey-Highland
- Moreland Avenue on the east, across which lies Candler Park
- DeKalb Avenue on the south, across which lie Cabbagetown and Reynoldstown

Little Five Points district is located where Inman Park and Candler Park meet at Moreland Avenue and Euclid/McClendon.

== Architecture ==
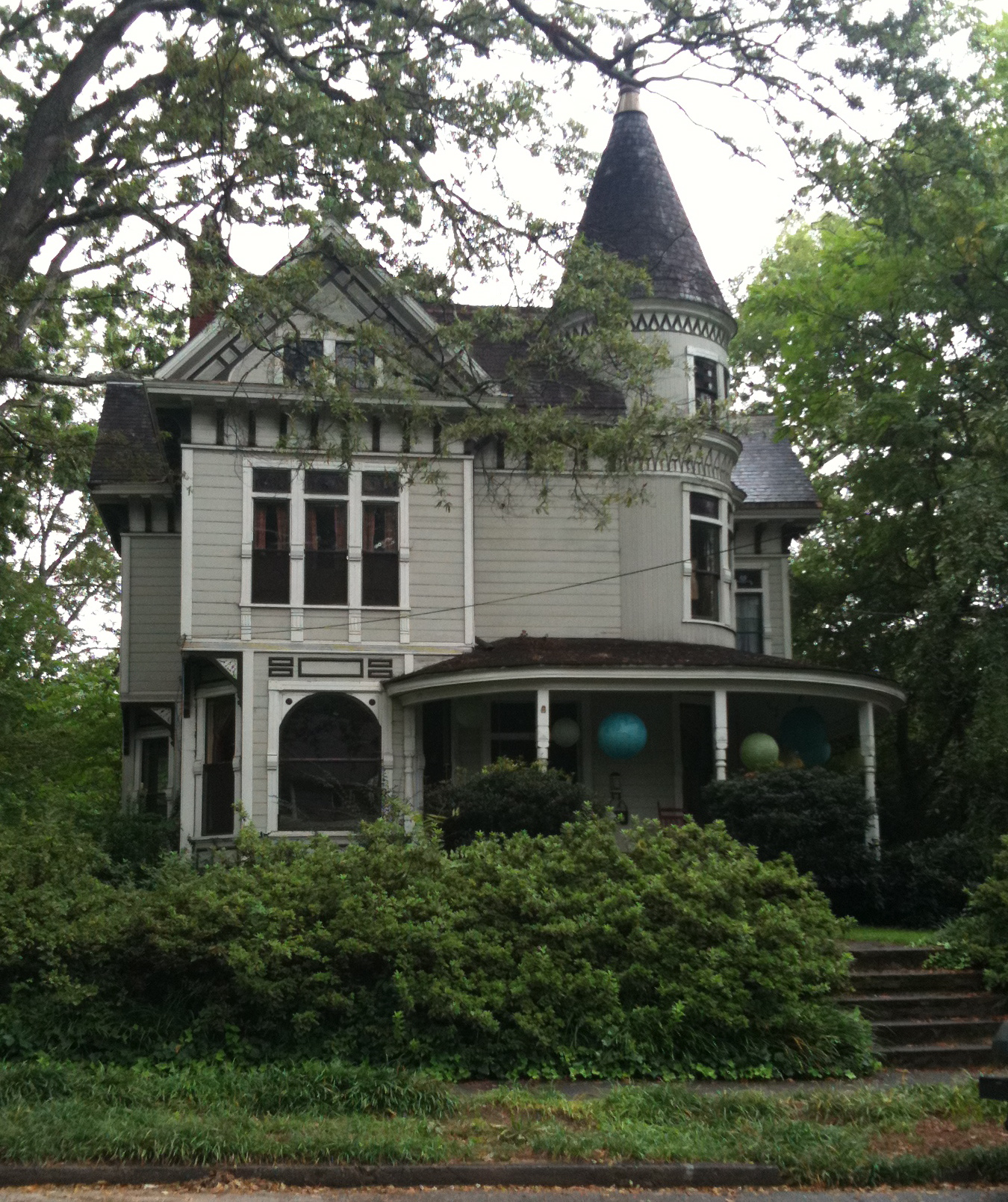
Woodruff House

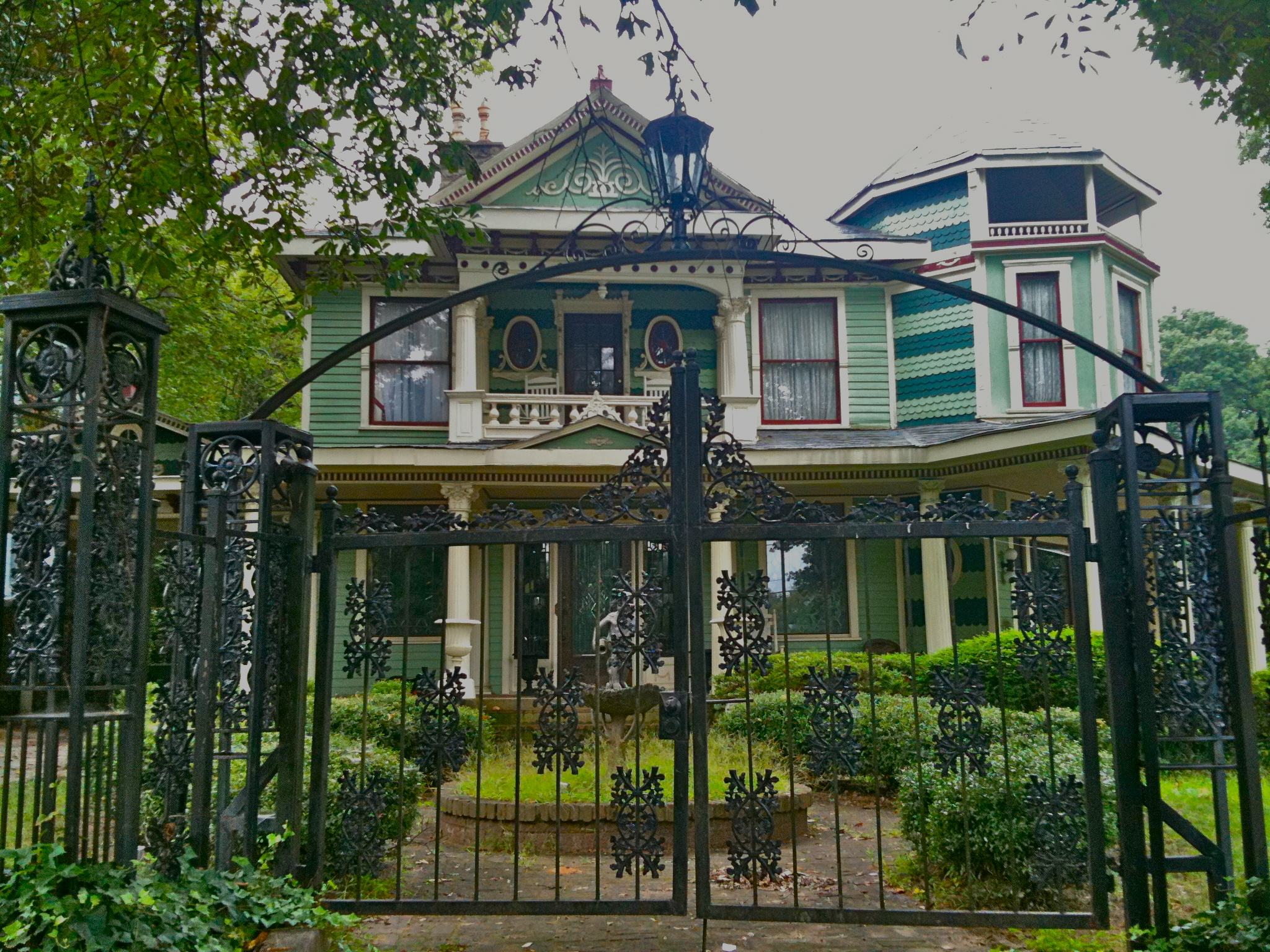
Victorian House with late 20th Century adornments added before historic zoning

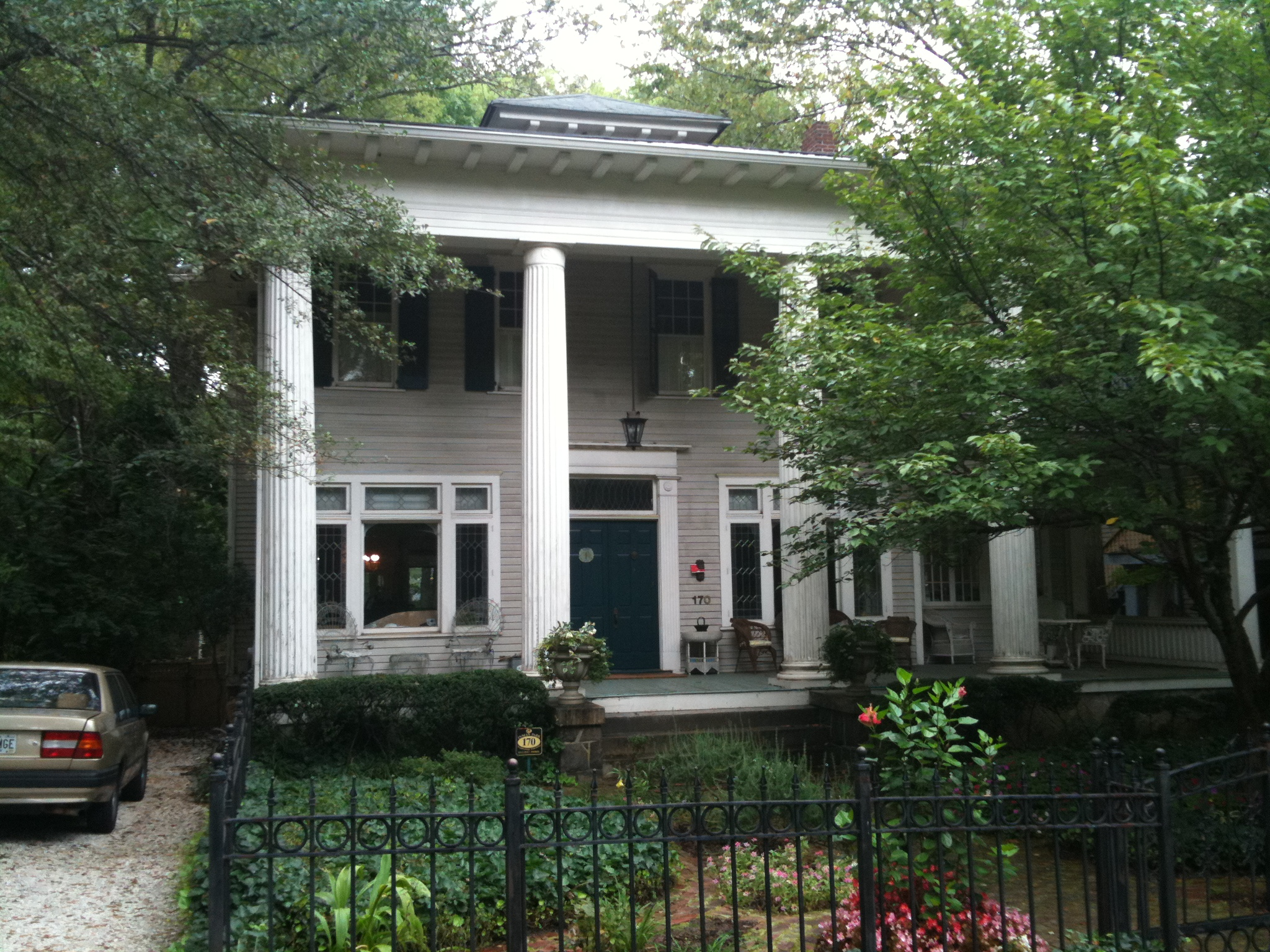
Four-Square with Greek Revival columns added in 1970s (before historic zoning)

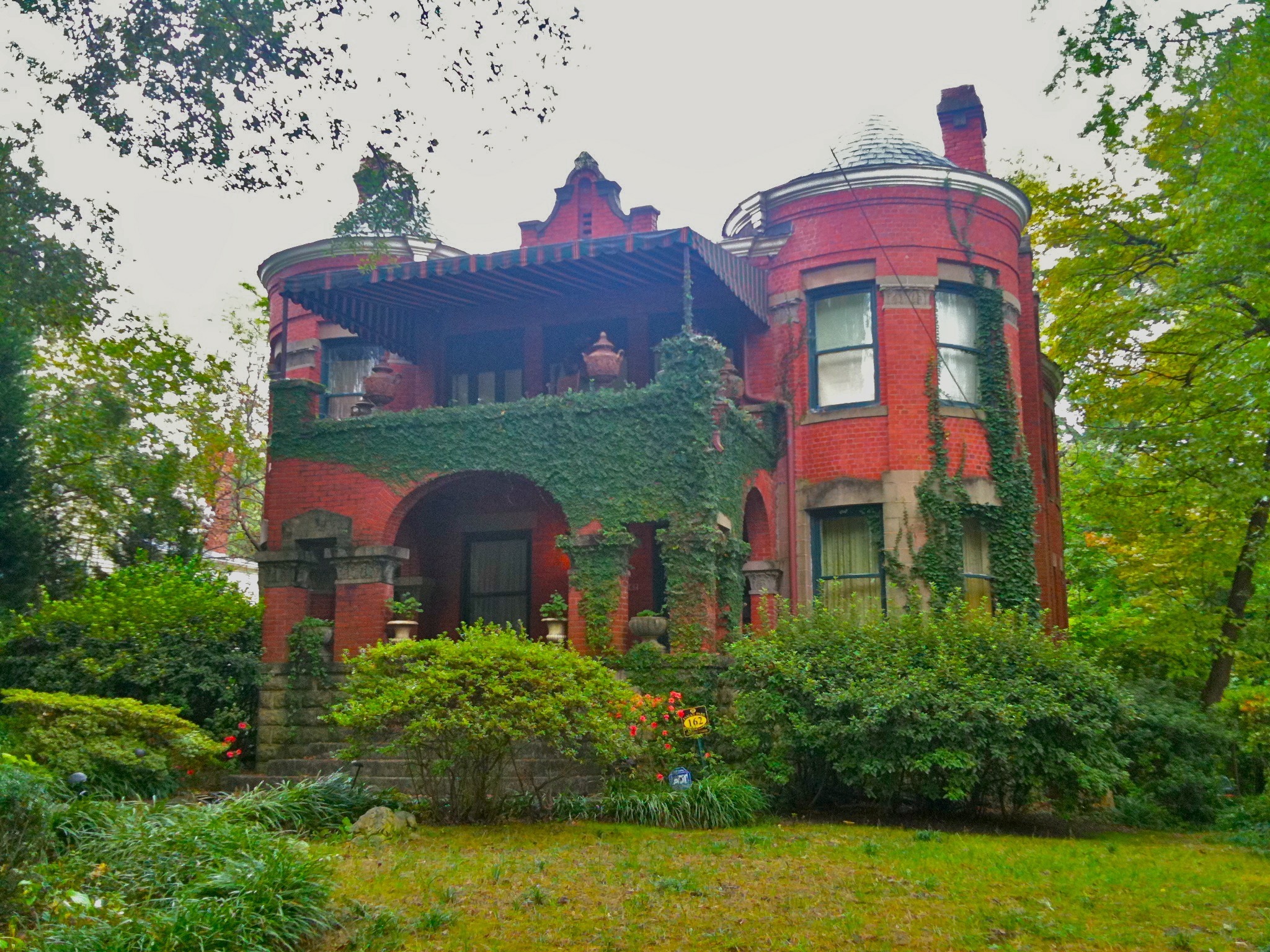
"The Castle" Romanesque Revival house

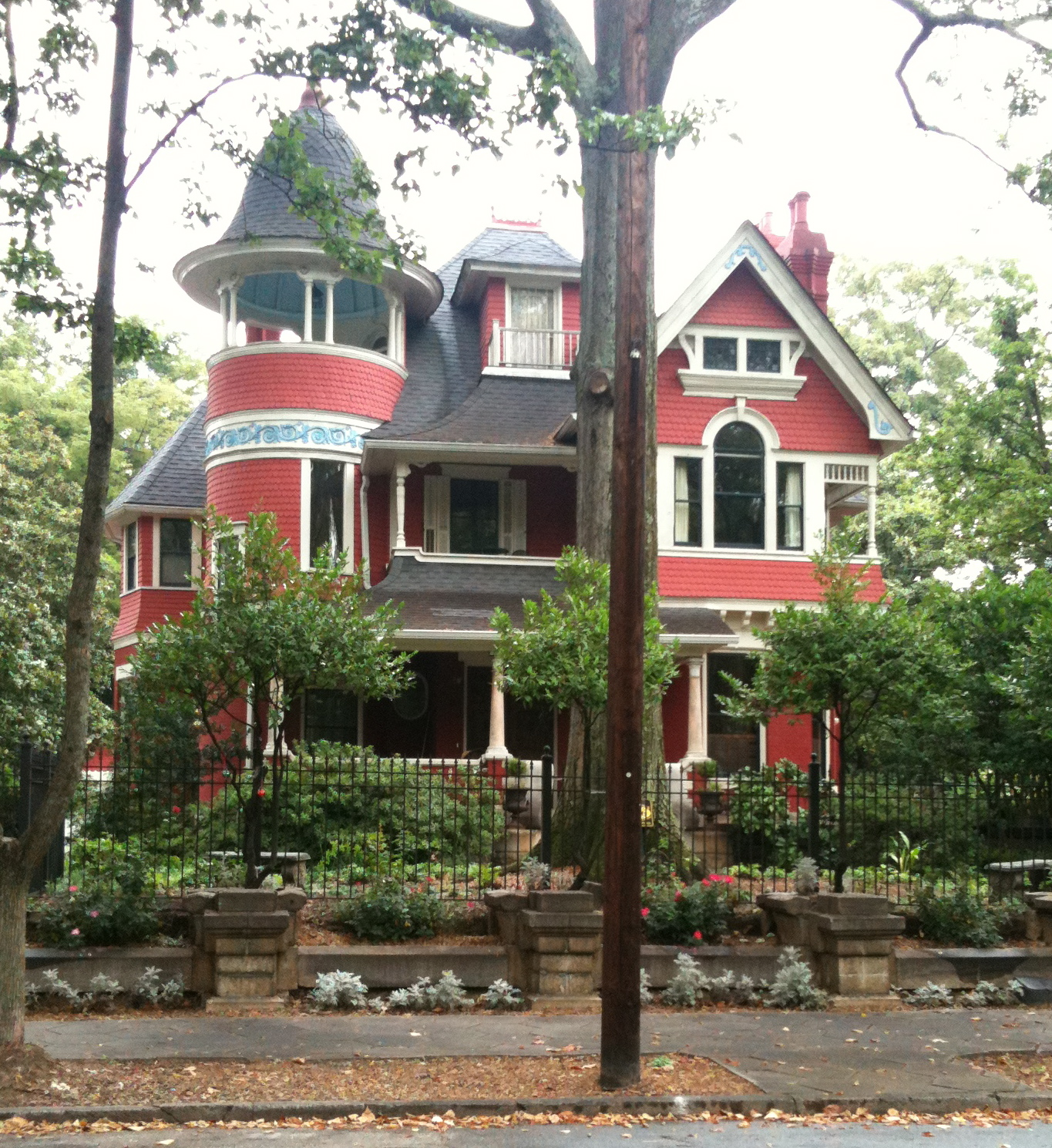
Beath-Dickey House

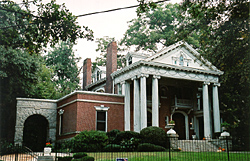
Callan Castle (Candler mansion)

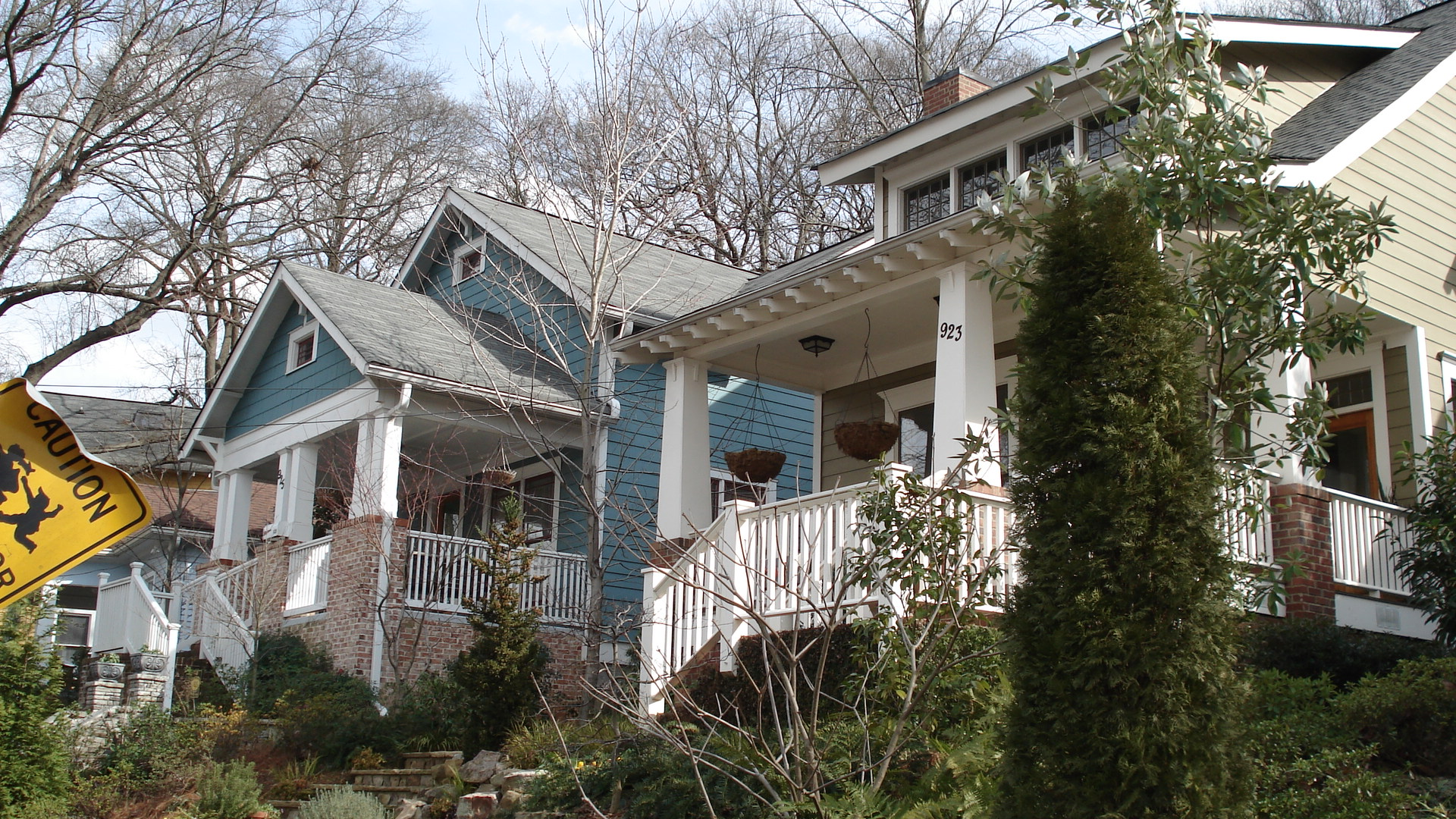
Late 20th Century Arts & Crafts Revival houses

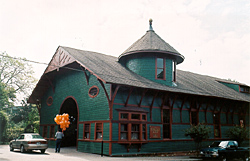
Trolley Barn

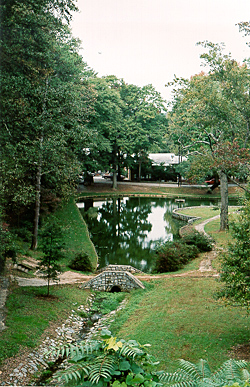
Springvale Park

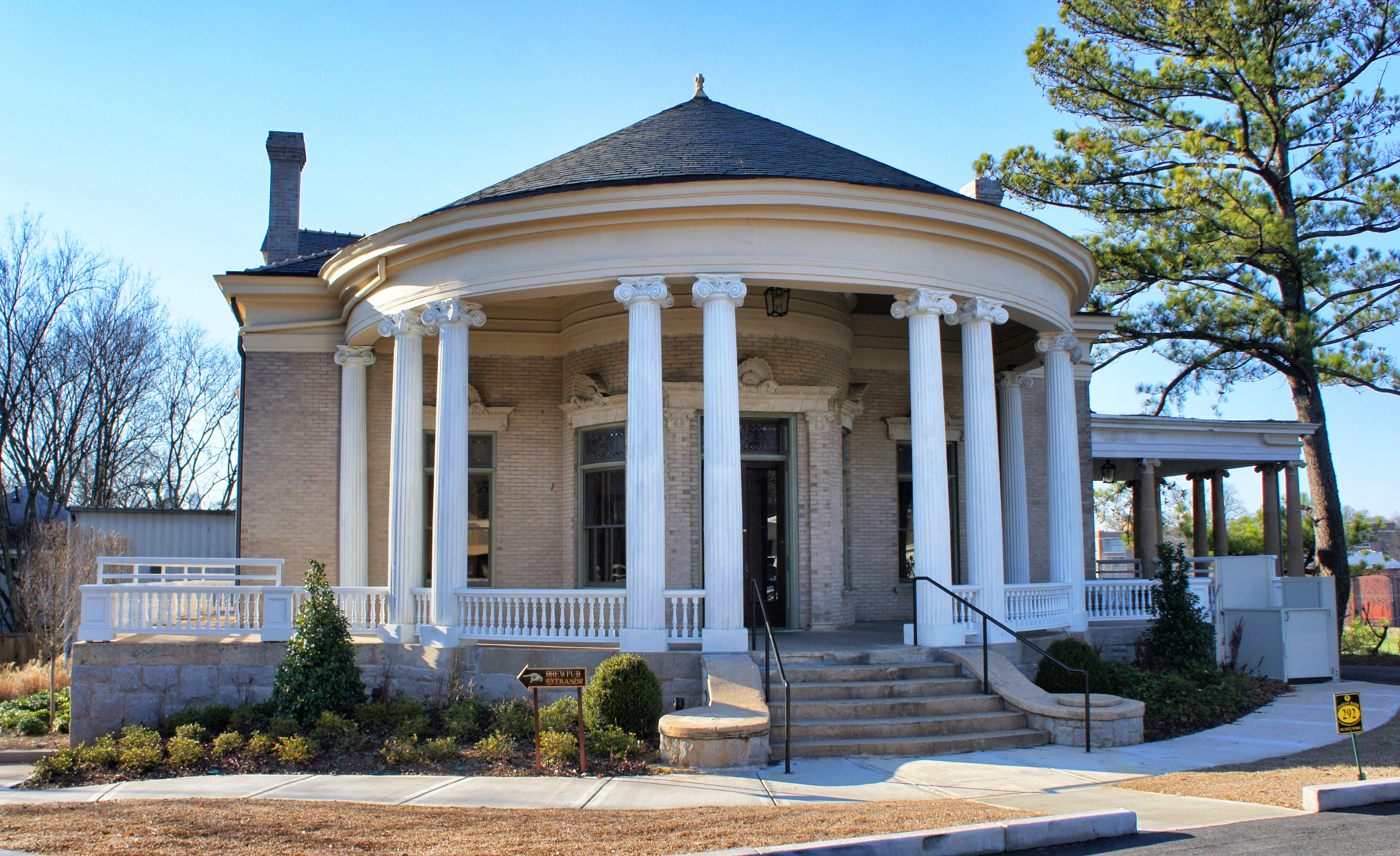
Kriegshaber House (Wrecking Bar Brewpub)

Inman Park contains Atlanta's best collection of residential architecture from the late 19th and early 20th centuries. Styles include Queen Anne, high-style Italianate and Romanesque mansion as well as smaller bungalows, shotguns, and foursquares. Inman Park was Atlanta's first example of a garden suburb, with great attention paid to street layout, parks and other public space, and would inspire other Atlanta garden suburbs such as the Frederick Law Olmsted-designed Druid Hills.

There are two historic districts within the Inman Park neighborhoods: the Inman Park historic district, and the Inman Park-Moreland Historic District, originally the separate suburb of Moreland Park.

Notable houses include:

- Beath-Dickey House
- Callan Castle (Candler mansion)
- Kriegshaber House (Wrecking Ball Brewpub)

== Other points of interest ==
- The Krog Street Tunnel under the CSX Railroad connects Inman Park with Cabbagetown and is famous for street art.
- Krog Street Market is a gourmet food hall
- Edgewood Avenue in both Inman Park and Old Fourth Ward is a restaurant street that has been gaining acclaim especially since 2013.
- Highland Avenue connects Inman Park to the Poncey Highland and Virginia Highland neighborhoods. The Highland Avenue corridor offers dozens of local restaurants and shops.
- St. Hilda's was built in 1939 as a Baptist church, and since 1978 has been a parish of the Anglican Catholic Church.

== Parks ==
Parks in Inman Park include Springvale Park, a pet project of Joel Hurt and designed by the Olmsted Brothers. Part of Freedom Park lies in the neighborhood, which the BeltLine trail also borders. There are also smaller parks: Delta Park, Inman Park, the park in Inman Park Village, and the Bass Recreation Center.

== Government ==
Inman Park is in NPU N. Neighbors participate in the Inman Park Neighborhood Association (IPNA).

== Education ==
Inman Park residents are served by Atlanta Public Schools.

Zoned schools include:

- Springdale Park Elementary School (SPARK)
- David T. Howard Middle School (previously Inman Middle School)
- Midtown High School

== Transportation ==
MARTA runs bus service and rail service. The Inman Park / Reynoldstown MARTA station is located at the south end of the neighborhood.
