= Lockhart v. United States (2016) =

Avondale Lockhart v. United States
- Supreme Court of the United States

Argued November 3, 2015 Decided March 1, 2016
- Full case name: Avondale Lockhart v. United States
- Docket no.: 14-8358
- Citations: 577 U.S. 347 (more) 136 S. Ct. 958; 194 L. Ed. 2d 48; 84 U.S.L.W. 4112

Holding
- The qualifier "involving a minor or ward" in 18 USC §2258(b)(2) applies only to the final item of the series, not the whole series. Lockhart's 10 year minimum sentence is thus valid under the statute.

Court membership
- Chief Justice John Roberts Associate Justices Anthony Kennedy · Clarence Thomas; Ruth Bader Ginsburg · Stephen Breyer; Samuel Alito · Sonia Sotomayor; Elena Kagan

Case opinions
- Majority: Sotomayor, joined by Roberts, Kennedy, Thomas, Ginsburg, Alito
- Dissent: Kagan, joined by Breyer

Laws applied
- 18 U.S.C. § 2252(b)(2)

Lockhart v. United States, 577 U.S. 347 (2016), is a United States Supreme Court decision concerning the interpretation of a federal statute. 18 U.S.C. § 2252(b)(2) states that a defendant convicted of possessing child pornography is subject to a mandatory 10-year minimum prison sentence if they have "a prior conviction . . . under the laws of any State relating to aggravated sexual abuse, sexual abuse, or abusive sexual conduct involving a minor or ward."

Avondale Lockhart, convicted of possession of child pornography, had a prior conviction for sexual abuse of his 53-year-old girlfriend under New York State law. He was sentenced to 10 years in prison under § 2252(b)(2). He appealed, claiming that the qualifier "involving a minor or ward" applies to the whole series, making his prior conviction not trigger the sentence enhancement. In a 6-2 decision, the Supreme Court held that the phrase only modifies the final item in the series, upholding the 10-year minimum sentence imposed on Lockhart.

== See also ==
- List of United States Supreme Court cases
- Lists of United States Supreme Court cases by volume
- List of United States Supreme Court cases by the Roberts Court
