= George W. Woodruff =

American businessman and engineer

George Waldo Woodruff
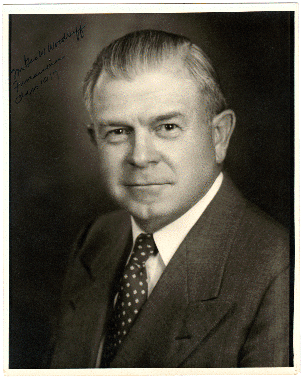
- George W. Woodruff
- Born: August 25, 1895
- Died: February 4, 1987 (aged 91); Emory University Hospital, Atlanta, Georgia, US
- Education: Georgia Tech
- Known for: Director of the Coca Cola Company for 49 years; philanthropist
- Spouse: Irene King Woodruff (1918–1982)
- Parent: Ernest Woodruff
- Relatives: Robert W. Woodruff (brother)

George Waldo Woodruff (August 27, 1895 – February 4, 1987 in Atlanta, Georgia) was an American engineer, businessman, and philanthropist in Atlanta, Georgia. He attended the Georgia Institute of Technology in 1917 and gave generously to both his alma mater and Emory University, including (in coordination with his brother Robert W. Woodruff) what was at the time the single largest donation ever to a school, $105 million to Emory University in 1979.

== Early life ==
Woodruff went to high school at Tech High School (now Midtown High School) and attended Georgia Tech's School of Mechanical Engineering and later the Massachusetts Institute of Technology, but left school in 1917 due to World War I. At Georgia Tech, he was a brother of the Kappa Alpha Order.

== Career ==
From 1936 to 1985 (49 years), Woodruff was the director of the Coca-Cola Company, although he was never an officer of the company. He also headed the Continental Gin Company from 1930 to 1985, which was a cotton-processing business. George was the last living child of Ernest Woodruff, the magnate that led the Trust Company (now known as SunTrust) and who orchestrated the takeover of the Coca-Cola Company. In 1984, Forbes magazine estimated that Woodruff was worth $200 million (equivalent to $619,795,003 as of 2025).

== Legacy ==
Woodruff is the namesake of several notable educational programs in Georgia. The George W. Woodruff School of Mechanical Engineering at Georgia Tech is the university's oldest and second-largest school; it was named for Woodruff in 1985 on the school's centennial. The Woodruff Residence Hall is also named after him. Woodruff left the Georgia Tech Foundation $37.5 million in his will, one of the largest private gifts the school has received.

Woodruff's will provided that his daughter, Frances Woodruff received no money, although it provides for the establishment of a $200,000 trust to be used on her behalf should she become destitute. According to a lawsuit, his two other daughters, Jane and Irene, were each to receive about $30 million.

Woodruff is remembered at Mercer University as well. He bequeathed the university's law school a $15 million endowment; the Woodruff Curriculum at Mercer's Walter F. George School of Law is named in his honor. At Emory, the George W. Woodruff Physical Education Center and the George and Irene Woodruff Residential Center bear his name. Finally, there are numerous scholarships at Georgia Tech, Mercer, Emory and the University of Georgia named in his memory.
