= 2001 term opinions of the Supreme Court of the United States =

October 2001 to October 2002 opinions

The 2001 term of the Supreme Court of the United States began October 1, 2001, and concluded October 6, 2002. The table illustrates which opinion was filed by each justice in each case and which justices joined each opinion.

== Table key ==
Delivered the court's opinion

Joined the court's opinion

Filed a concurrence

Joined a concurrence

Filed a dissent

Joined a dissent

Filed a concurrence/dissent

Joined a concurrence/dissent

Did not participate in the decision
- Decisions that do not note an argument date were decided without oral argument. Decisions that do not note a justice delivering the court's opinion are per curiam.
- Multiple concurrences and dissents within a case are numbered, with joining votes numbered accordingly. Justices frequently join multiple opinions in a single case; each vote is subdivided accordingly.
- An asterisk ( * ) in the court's opinion denotes that it was only a majority in part or a plurality. An asterisk in a joining vote denotes that the justice joined it only in part.
- A dash ( - ) denotes that the justice voted without filing or joining an opinion.

== 2001 term opinions ==
#	Case name and citation	Argued	Decided	Rehnquist	Stevens	O'Connor	Scalia	Kennedy	Souter	Thomas	Ginsburg	Breyer
1	United States Postal Service v. Gregory, 534 U.S. 1	October 9, 2001	November 13, 2001							1	2	
2	TRW Inc. v. Andrews, 534 U.S. 19	October 9, 2001	November 13, 2001									
3	Correctional Services Corp. v. Malesko, 534 U.S. 61	October 1, 2001	November 27, 2001									
4	Chickasaw Nation v. United States, 534 U.S. 84	October 2, 2001	November 27, 2001				*			*		
5	Adarand Constructors, Inc. v. Mineta, 534 U.S. 103	October 31, 2001	November 27, 2001									
6	United States v. Knights (2001), 534 U.S. 112	November 6, 2001	December 10, 2001									
7	J. E. M. Ag Supply, Inc. v. Pioneer Hi-Bred International, Inc., 534 U.S. 124	October 3, 2001	December 10, 2001									
8	Stewart v. Smith, 534 U.S. 157		December 12, 2001									
9	Dusenberry v. United States, 534 U.S. 161	October 29, 2001	January 8, 2002									
10	Toyota Motor Mfg., Ky., Inc. v. Williams, 534 U.S. 184	November 7, 2001	January 8, 2002									
11	Great-West Life & Annuity Ins. Co. v. Knudson, 534 U.S. 204	October 1, 2001	January 8, 2002		1 / 2				2		2	2
12	Chao v. Mallard Bay Drilling, Inc., 534 U.S. 235	October 31, 2001	January 9, 2002									
13	Kelly v. South Carolina, 234 U.S. 246	November 26, 2001	January 9, 2002	1			2	1		2		
14	United States v. Arvizu, 534 U.S. 266	November 27, 2001	January 15, 2002									
15	EEOC v. Waffle House, Inc., 534 U.S. 279	October 10, 2001	January 15, 2002									
16	Thomas v. Chicago Park Dist., 534 U.S. 316	December 3, 2001	January 15, 2002									
17	National Cable & Telecommunications Assn., Inc. v. Gulf Power Co., 534 U.S. 327	October 2, 2001	January 16, 2002						*	*		
18	Lee v. Kemna, 534 U.S. 362	October 29, 2001	January 22, 2002									
19	Kansas v. Crane, 534 U.S. 407	October 30, 2001	January 22, 2002									
20	Owasso Independent School Dist. No. I-011 v. Falvo, 534 U.S. 426	November 27, 2001	February 19, 2002									
21	Barnhart v. Sigmon Coal Co., 534 U.S. 438	November 7, 2001	February 19, 2002									
22	Wisconsin Dept. of Health and Family Servs. v. Blumer, 534 U.S. 473	December 3, 2001	February 20, 2002									
23	Swierkiewicz v. Sorema N. A., 534 U.S. 506	January 15, 2002	February 26, 2002									
24	Porter v. Nussle, 534 U.S. 516	January 14, 2002	February 26, 2002									
25	Raygor v. Regents of Univ. of Minn., 534 U.S. 533	November 26, 2001	February 27, 2002									
26	New York v. FERC, 535 U.S. 1	October 3, 2001	March 4, 2002				*	*		*		
27	Young v. United States, 535 U.S. 43	January 9, 2002	March 4, 2002									
28	United States v. Vonn, 535 U.S. 55	November 6, 2001	March 4, 2002		*							
29	Ragsdale v. Wolverine World Wide, Inc., 535 U.S. 81	January 7, 2002	March 19, 2002									
30	Edelman v. Lynchburg College, 535 U.S. 106	January 8, 2002	March 19, 2002			1	1			2		
31	Department of Housing and Urban Development v. Rucker, 535 U.S. 125	February 19, 2002	March 26, 2002									
32	Hoffman Plastic Compounds, Inc. v. NLRB, 535 U.S. 137	January 15, 2002	March 27, 2002									
33	Mickens v. Taylor, 535 U.S. 162	November 5, 2001	March 27, 2002		1				2		3	3
34	Barnhart v. Walton, 535 U.S. 212	January 16, 2002	March 27, 2002				*					
35	Adams v. Florida Power Corp., 535 U.S. 228	March 20, 2002	April 1, 2002									
36	Sao Paulo State of Federative Republic of Brazil v. American Tobacco Co., 535 U.S. 229		April 1, 2002									
37	Ashcroft v. Free Speech Coalition, 535 U.S. 234	October 30, 2001	April 16, 2002	*			* / *					
38	United States v. Craft, 535 U.S. 274	January 14, 2002	April 17, 2002		2		1 / 2			1 / 2		
39	Tahoe-Sierra Preservation Council, Inc. v. Tahoe Regional Planning Agency, 535 U.S. 302	January 7, 2002	April 23, 2002	1			1 / 2			1 / 2		
40	Thompson v. Western States Medical Center, 535 U.S. 357	February 26, 2002	April 29, 2002									
41	US Airways, Inc. v. Barnett, 535 U.S. 391	December 4, 2001	April 29, 2002		1	2	1		2	1	2	
42	Los Angeles v. Alameda Books, Inc., 535 U.S. 425	December 4, 2001	May 13, 2002			*	1	2				*
43	Verizon Communications Inc. v. FCC, 535 U.S. 467	October 10, 2001	May 13, 2002				* / *			*		
44	Ashcroft v. American Civil Liberties Union, 535 U.S. 564	November 28, 2001	May 13, 2002			* / 1		2	2	*	2	* / 3
45	Lapides v. Board of Regents of Univ. System of Ga., 535 U.S. 613	February 25, 2002	May 13, 2002									
46	United States v. Cotton, 535 U.S. 625	April 15, 2002	May 20, 2002									
47	Verizon Md. Inc. v. Public Serv. Comm'n of Md., 535 U.S. 635	December 5, 2001	May 20, 2002					1	2		2	2
48	Alabama v. Shelton, 535 U.S. 654	February 19, 2002	May 20, 2002									
49	Mathias v. WorldCom Technologies, Inc., 535 U.S. 682	December 5, 2001	May 20, 2002									
50	Bell v. Cone, 535 U.S. 685	March 25, 2002	May 28, 2002									
51	Festo Corp. v. Shoketsu Kinzoku Kogyo Kabushiki Co., 535 U.S. 722	January 8, 2002	May 28, 2002									
52	Federal Maritime Comm'n v. South Carolina Ports Authority, 535 U.S. 743	February 25, 2002	May 28, 2002		1 / 2				2		2	2
53	Gisbrecht v. Barnhart, 535 U.S. 789	March 20, 2002	May 28, 2002									
54	SEC v. Zandford, 535 U.S. 813	March 18, 2002	June 3, 2002									
55	Holmes Group, Inc. v. Vornado Air Circulation Systems, Inc., 535 U.S. 826	March 19, 2002	June 3, 2002		* / 1	2					2	
56	Devlin v. Scardelletti, 536 U.S. 1	March 26, 2002	June 10, 2002									
57	McKune v. Lile, 536 U.S. 24	November 28, 2001	June 10, 2002					*				
58	Chevron U. S. A. Inc. v. Echazabal, 536 U.S. 73	February 27, 2002	June 10, 2002									
59	JPMorgan Chase Bank v. Traffic Stream (BVI) Infrastructure Ltd., 536 U.S. 88	April 17, 2002	June 10, 2002									
60	National Railroad Passenger Corporation v. Morgan, 536 U.S. 101	January 9, 2002	June 10, 2002	*		*	* / *	* / *				*
61	Franconia Associates v. United States, 536 U.S. 129	April 15, 2002	June 10, 2002									
62	Watchtower Bible & Tract Soc. of N. Y., Inc. v. Village of Stratton, 536 U.S. 150	February 26, 2002	June 17, 2002				1		2	1	2	2
63	Barnes v. Gorman, 536 U.S. 181	April 23, 2002	June 17, 2002		1	2			2		1	1
64	United States v. Drayton, 536 U.S. 194	April 16, 2002	June 17, 2002									
65	Carey v. Saffold, 536 U.S. 214	February 27, 2002	June 17, 2002									
66	United States v. Fior D'Italia, Inc., 536 U.S. 238	April 22, 2002	June 17, 2002									
67	Horn v. Banks, 536 U.S. 266		June 17, 2002									
68	Gonzaga University v. Doe, 536 U.S. 273	April 24, 2002	June 20, 2002									
69	Atkins v. Virginia, 536 U.S. 304	February 20, 2002	June 20, 2002	1 / 2			1 / 2			1 / 2		
70	Rush Prudential HMO, Inc. v. Moran, 536 U.S. 355	January 16, 2002	June 20, 2002									
71	Christopher v. Harbury, 536 U.S. 403	March 18, 2002	June 20, 2002									
72	City of Columbus v. Ours Garage & Wrecker Service, Inc., 536 U.S. 424	April 23, 2002	June 20, 2002									
73	Utah v. Evans, 536 U.S. 452	March 27, 2002	June 20, 2002			* / 1	1	2		2		
74	BE&K Construction Co. v. NLRB, 536 U.S. 516	April 16, 2002	June 24, 2002		2		1		2	1	2	2
75	Harris v. United States, 536 U.S. 545	March 25, 2002	June 24, 2002			1		*				* / 2
76	Ring v. Arizona, 536 U.S. 584	April 22, 2002	June 24, 2002				1	2		1		3
77	United States v. Ruiz, 536 U.S. 622	April 24, 2002	June 24, 2002									
78	Kirk v. Louisiana, 536 U.S. 635		June 24, 2002									
79	Zelman v. Simmons-Harris, 536 U.S. 639	February 20, 2002	June 27, 2002		1 / 2 / 3	1			2 / 3	2	2	2 / 3
80	Hope v. Pelzer, 536 U.S. 730	April 17, 2002	June 27, 2002									
81	Republican Party of Minnesota v. White, 536 U.S. 765	March 26, 2002	June 27, 2002		1 / 2	1		2	1 / 2		1 / 2	1 / 2
82	Board of Ed. of Independent School Dist. No. 92 of Pottawatomie Cty. v. Earls, 536 U.S. 822	March 19, 2002	June 27, 2002		2	1 / 2			1 / 2		2	
83	Stewart v. Smith, 536 U.S. 856		June 28, 2002									
84	United States v. Bass, 536 U.S. 862		June 28, 2002									
#	Case name and citation	Argued	Decided	Rehnquist	Stevens	O'Connor	Scalia	Kennedy	Souter	Thomas	Ginsburg	Breyer

== 2001 term membership and statistics ==
This was the sixteenth term of Chief Justice Rehnquist's tenure, and the eighth consecutive term in which the Court's membership had not changed.

Justice		Appointment history		Agreement with judgment		Opinions filed				
Seniority	Name	President	Date confirmed	%	#					Total
Chief Justice	William Rehnquist	Richard Nixon	January 7, 1972	84.5%	71/84	10	0	0	5	15
Associate Justice	John Paul Stevens	Gerald Ford	December 19, 1975	72.6%	61/84	8	3	1	13	25
Associate Justice	Sandra Day O'Connor	Ronald Reagan	September 25, 1981	87.3%	69/79	8	7	3	4	22
Associate Justice	Antonin Scalia	Ronald Reagan	September 26, 1986	73.5%	61/83	8	10	0	9	27
Associate Justice	Anthony Kennedy	Ronald Reagan	February 18, 1988	89.3%	75/84	8	6	0	2	16
Associate Justice	David Souter	George H. W. Bush	October 9, 1990	77.4%	65/84	8	3	0	6	17
Associate Justice	Clarence Thomas	George H. W. Bush	October 23, 1991	78.6%	66/84	7	7	3	7	24
Associate Justice	Ruth Bader Ginsburg	Bill Clinton	August 10, 1993	79.8%	67/84	9	3	0	4	16
Associate Justice	Stephen Breyer	Bill Clinton	August 3, 1994	79.5%	66/83	9	7	1	6	23
Notes on statistics: Opinion counts only include the bench opinions listed above; opinions relating to orders or in-chambers opinions are not included.; Agreement with the Court's judgment does not guarantee agreement with the reasoning expressed in its opinion. A justice is not considered in agreement if they dissented even in part. Agreement percentages are based only on the listed cases in which a justice participated and are rounded to the nearest one-tenth of one percentage point.						Totals				
Notes on statistics: Opinion counts only include the bench opinions listed above; opinions relating to orders or in-chambers opinions are not included.; Agreement with the Court's judgment does not guarantee agreement with the reasoning expressed in its opinion. A justice is not considered in agreement if they dissented even in part. Agreement percentages are based only on the listed cases in which a justice participated and are rounded to the nearest one-tenth of one percentage point.						75	46	8	56	185
