= 2001 term United States Supreme Court opinions of John Paul Stevens =

The 2001 term of the Supreme Court of the United States began October 1, 2001, and concluded October 6, 2002. This was the twenty-seventh term of Associate Justice John Paul Stevens's tenure on the Court.
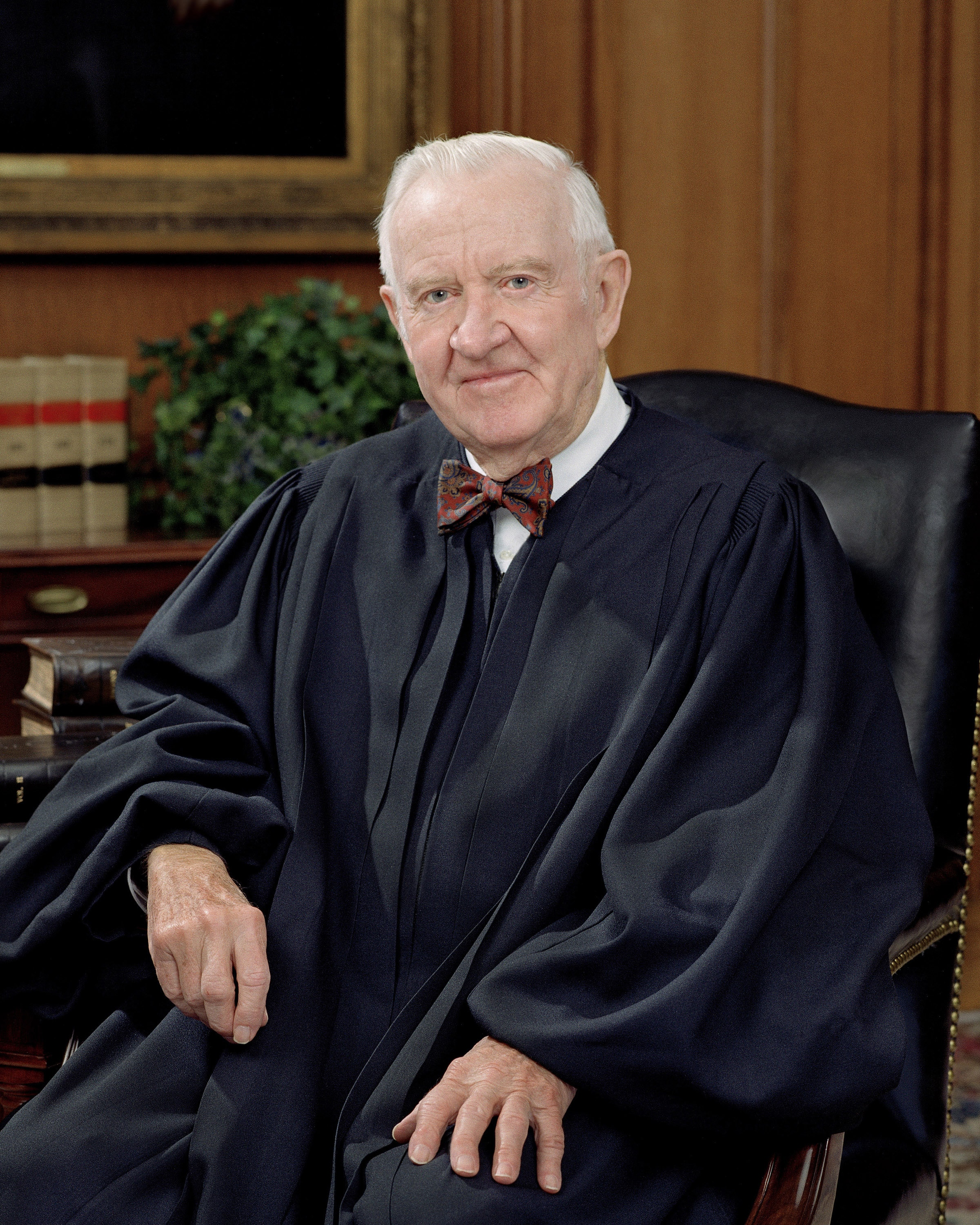

John Paul Stevens 2001 term statistics

8	Majority or plurality	3	Concurrence	1	Other
14	Dissent	1	Concurrence/dissent	Total =	27
Bench opinions = 25		Opinions relating to orders = 1		In-chambers opinions = 1
Unanimous opinions: 1		Most joined by: Breyer (14)		Least joined by: Rehnquist, Scalia, Thomas (3)

Type	Case	Citation	Issues	Joined by	Other opinions
	Correctional Services Corp. v. Malesko	534 U.S. 61 (2001)		Souter, Ginsburg, Breyer	
	Great-West Life & Annuity Ins. Co. v. Knudson	534 U.S. 204 (2002)			
	Chao v. Mallard Bay Drilling, Inc.	534 U.S. 235 (2002)		Rehnquist, O'Connor, Kennedy, Souter, Thomas, Ginsburg, Breyer	
	EEOC v. Waffle House, Inc.	534 U.S. 279 (2002)		O'Connor, Kennedy, Souter, Ginsburg, Breyer	
	Barnhart v. Sigmon Coal Co.	534 U.S. 438 (2002)		O'Connor, Breyer	
	Wisconsin Dept. of Health and Family Servs. v. Blumer	534 U.S. 473 (2002)		O'Connor, Scalia	
	Raygor v. Regents of Univ. of Minn.	534 U.S. 533 (2002)		Souter, Breyer	
	Bagley v. Bird	534 U.S. 1301 (2001)			
Stevens denied an application for a stay.
	New York v. FERC	535 U.S. 1 (2002)		Rehnquist, O'Connor, Souter, Ginsburg, Breyer; Scalia, Kennedy, Thomas (in part)	
	United States v. Vonn	535 U.S. 55 (2002)			
	Mickens v. Taylor	535 U.S. 162 (2002)			
	Tahoe-Sierra Preservation Council v. Tahoe Regional Planning Agency	535 U.S. 302 (2002)	takings • land use regulation	O'Connor, Kennedy, Souter, Ginsburg, Breyer	
	US Airways, Inc. v. Barnett	535 U.S. 391 (2002)			
	Ashcroft v. American Civil Liberties Union	535 U.S. 564 (2002)			
	Bell v. Cone	535 U.S. 685 (2002)			
	Federal Maritime Comm'n v. South Carolina Ports Authority	535 U.S. 743 (2002)			
	SEC v. Zandford	535 U.S. 813 (2002)		Unanimous	
	Holmes Group, Inc. v. Vornado Air Circulation Systems, Inc.	535 U.S. 826 (2002)			
	McKune v. Lile	536 U.S. 24 (2002)		Souter, Ginsburg, Breyer	
	Watchtower Society v. Village of Stratton	536 U.S. 150 (2002)	First Amendment	O'Connor, Kennedy, Souter, Ginsburg, Breyer	
	Barnes v. Gorman	536 U.S. 181 (2002)		Ginsburg, Breyer	
	Gonzaga University v. Doe	536 U.S. 273 (2002)		Ginsburg	
	Atkins v. Virginia	536 U.S. 304 (2002)	death penalty • execution of the intellectually disabled	O'Connor, Kennedy, Souter, Ginsburg, Breyer	
The Court ruled that the Eighth Amendment prohibited the execution of the intellectually disabled.
	Zelman v. Simmons-Harris	536 U.S. 639 (2002)			
	Hope v. Pelzer	536 U.S. 730 (2002)		O'Connor, Kennedy, Souter, Ginsburg, Breyer	
	Republican Party of Minnesota v. White	536 U.S. 765 (2002)	First Amendment	Souter, Ginsburg, Breyer	
	Patterson v. Texas	536 U.S. 984 (2002)	Death penalty: execution of minors		
Stevens dissented from the Court's denial of a stay of the execution of an individual who was 17 when he committed the capital offense, believing the Court should revisit the issue of whether it was constitutional to impose the death penalty for crimes committed when the offender was a minor. Ginsburg also filed a dissent. The Court ruled three years later that the Eighth Amendment prohibited capital punishment when the offender was under 18, in Roper v. Simmons, 543 U.S. 551 (2005).
