= 2001 term United States Supreme Court opinions of Clarence Thomas =

The 2001 term of the Supreme Court of the United States began October 1, 2001, and concluded October 6, 2002. This was the eleventh term of Associate Justice Clarence Thomas's tenure on the Court.
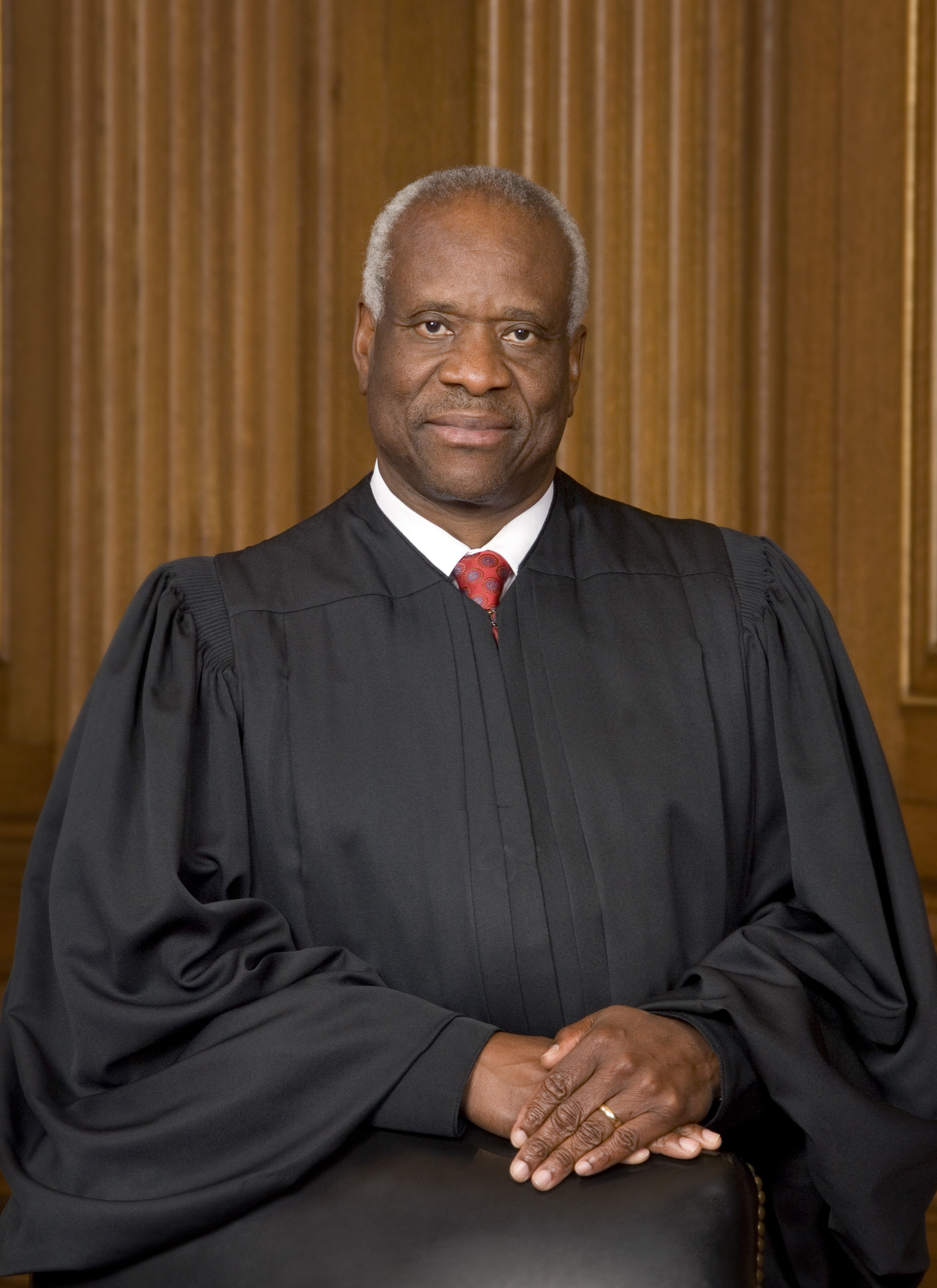

Clarence Thomas 2001 term statistics

7	Majority or plurality	7	Concurrence	0	Other
7	Dissent	3	Concurrence/dissent	Total =	24
Bench opinions = 24		Opinions relating to orders = 0		In-chambers opinions = 0
Unanimous opinions: 1		Most joined by: Scalia (14)		Least joined by: Stevens (3)

Type	Case	Citation	Issues	Joined by	Other opinions
	United States Postal Service v. Gregory	534 U.S. 1 (2001)			
	J. E. M. Ag Supply, Inc. v. Pioneer Hi-Bred International, Inc.	534 U.S. 124 (2001)		Rehnquist, Scalia, Kennedy, Souter, Ginsburg	
	Kelly v. South Carolina	534 U.S. 246 (2001)		Scalia	
	EEOC v. Waffle House, Inc.	534 U.S. 279 (2002)		Rehnquist, Scalia	
	National Cable & Telecommunications Assn., Inc. v. Gulf Power Co.	534 U.S. 327 (2002)		Souter	
	Barnhart v. Sigmon Coal Co.	534 U.S. 438 (2002)		Rehnquist, Scalia, Kennedy, Souter, Ginsburg	
	Swierkiewicz v. Sorema N. A.	534 U.S. 506 (2002)		Unanimous	
	New York v. FERC	535 U.S. 1 (2002)		Scalia, Kennedy	
	Edelman v. Lynchburg College	535 U.S. 106 (2002)			
	Ashcroft v. Free Speech Coalition	535 U.S. 234 (2002)			
	United States v. Craft	535 U.S. 274 (2002)		O'Connor, Scalia	
	Tahoe-Sierra Preservation Council, Inc. v. Tahoe Regional Planning Agency	535 U.S. 302 (2002)		Scalia	
	Thompson v. Western States Medical Center	535 U.S. 357 (2002)			
	Ashcroft v. American Civil Liberties Union	535 U.S. 564 (2002)		Rehnquist, Scalia; O'Connor, Breyer (in part)	
	Federal Maritime Comm'n v. South Carolina Ports Authority	535 U.S. 743 (2002)		Rehnquist, O'Connor, Scalia, Kennedy	
	National Railroad Passenger Corporation v. Morgan	536 U.S. 101 (2002)		Stevens, Souter, Ginsburg, Breyer; Rehnquist, O'Connor, Scalia, Kennedy (in part)	
	Rush Prudential HMO, Inc. v. Moran	536 U.S. 355 (2002)		Rehnquist, Scalia, Kennedy	
	Christopher v. Harbury	536 U.S. 403 (2002)			
	Utah v. Evans	536 U.S. 452 (2002)		Kennedy	
	Harris v. United States	536 U.S. 545 (2002)		Stevens, Souter, Ginsburg	
	United States v. Ruiz	536 U.S. 622 (2002)			
	Zelman v. Simmons-Harris	536 U.S. 639 (2002)			
	Hope v. Pelzer	536 U.S. 730 (2002)		Rehnquist, Scalia	
	Board of Ed. of Independent School Dist. No. 92 of Pottawatomie Cty. v. Earls	536 U.S. 822 (2002)		Rehnquist, Scalia, Kennedy, Breyer	
