= 2001 term United States Supreme Court opinions of Stephen Breyer =

The 2001 term of the Supreme Court of the United States began October 1, 2001, and concluded October 6, 2002. This was the eighth term of Associate Justice Stephen Breyer's tenure on the Court.
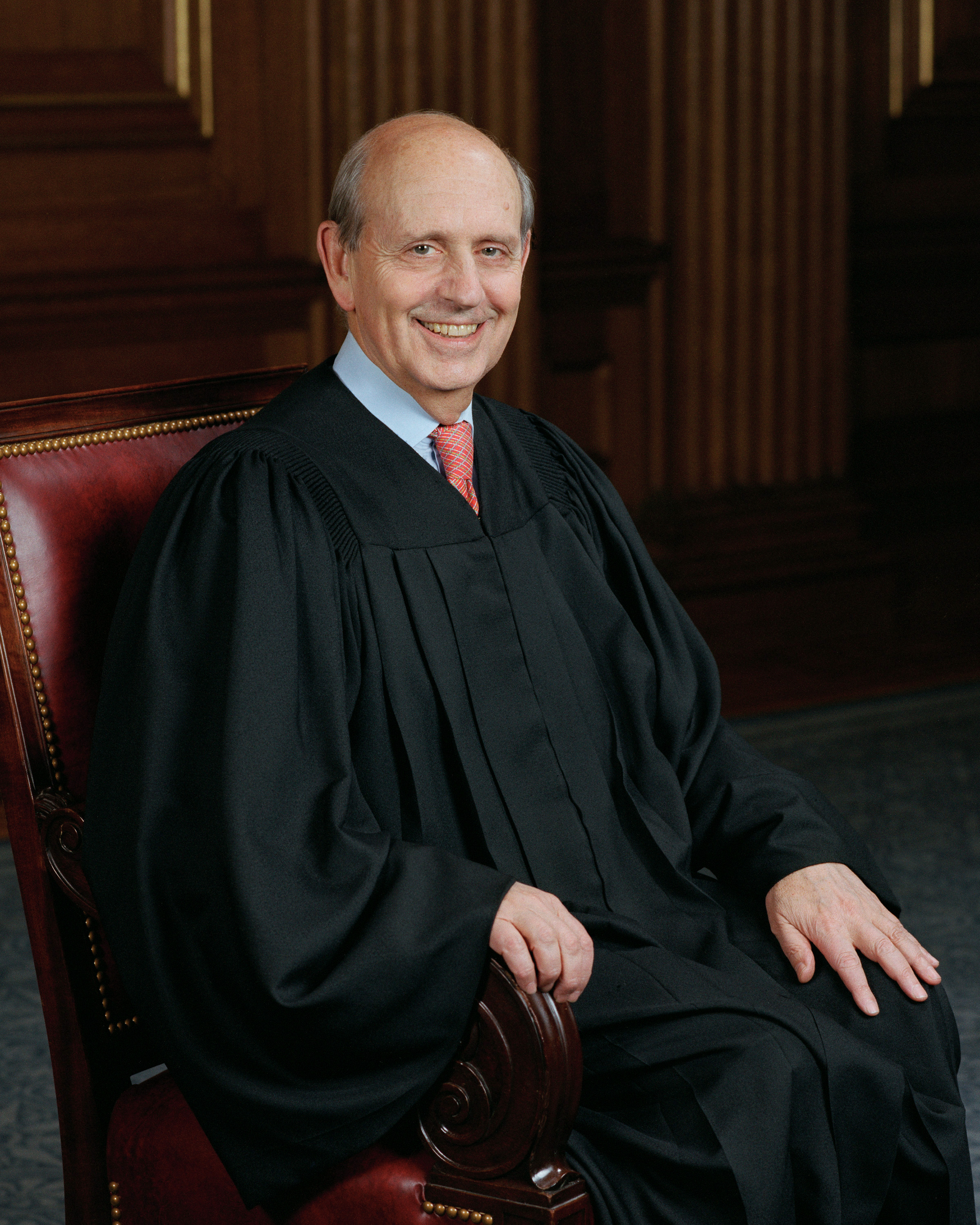

Stephen Breyer 2001 term statistics

9	Majority or plurality	7	Concurrence	1	Other
8	Dissent	1	Concurrence/dissent	Total =	26
Bench opinions = 23		Opinions relating to orders = 3		In-chambers opinions = 0
Unanimous opinions: 1		Most joined by: Stevens (15)		Least joined by: Thomas (3)

Type	Case	Citation	Issues	Joined by	Other opinions
	Chickasaw Nation v. United States	534 U.S. 84 (2001)		Rehnquist, Stevens, Kennedy, Ginsburg; Scalia, Thomas (in part)	
	J. E. M. Ag Supply, Inc. v. Pioneer Hi-Bred International, Inc.	534 U.S. 124 (2001)		Stevens	
	Kansas v. Crane	534 U.S. 407 (2002)		Rehnquist, Stevens, O'Connor, Kennedy, Souter, Ginsburg	
	Overton v. Ohio	534 U.S. 982 (2001)		Stevens, O'Connor, Souter	
Breyer filed a statement respecting the Court's denial of certiorari.
	Hoffman Plastic Compounds, Inc. v. NLRB	535 U.S. 137 (2002)		Stevens, Souter, Ginsburg	
	Mickens v. Taylor	535 U.S. 162 (2002)		Ginsburg	
	Barnhart v. Walton	535 U.S. 212 (2002)		Rehnquist, Stevens, O'Connor, Kennedy, Souter, Thomas, Ginsburg; Scalia (in part)	
	Thompson v. Western States Medical Center	535 U.S. 357 (2002)		Rehnquist, Stevens, Ginsburg	
	US Airways, Inc. v. Barnett	535 U.S. 391 (2002)		Rehnquist, Stevens, O'Connor, Kennedy	
	Verizon Communications Inc. v. FCC	535 U.S. 467 (2002)		Scalia (in part)	
	Ashcroft v. American Civil Liberties Union	535 U.S. 564 (2002)			
	Lapides v. Board of Regents of Univ. System of Ga.	535 U.S. 613 (2002)		Unanimous	
	Federal Maritime Comm'n v. South Carolina Ports Authority	535 U.S. 743 (2002)		Stevens, Souter, Ginsburg	
	Williams v. United States	535 U.S. 911 (2002)		Scalia, Kennedy	
Breyer dissented from the Court's denial of certiorari.
	Federal Rules of Criminal Procedure	535 U.S. 1157 (2002)	Criminal procedure • Confrontation Clause	O'Connor	
Breyer filed a dissent from the Court's decision not to transmit to Congress proposed amendments to Federal Rule of Criminal Procedure 26(b), which would have permitted witness testimony via two-way video transmission. Breyer disagreed with the majority's concerns that the proposed rule was unconstitutional under the Sixth Amendment, and noted that transmittal of the rule would not constitute a judgment by the Court that it was constitutional. Instead, "rather than consider the constitutional matter in the context of a defendant who objects, the Court denies all litigants—prosecutors and consenting defendants alike—the benefits of advances in modern technology. And it thereby deprives litigants, judges, and the public of technology that will help to create trial procedures that are both more efficient and more fair."
	Watchtower Bible & Tract Soc. of N. Y., Inc. v. Village of Stratton	536 U.S. 150 (2002)		Souter, Ginsburg	
	Carey v. Saffold	536 U.S. 214 (2002)		Stevens, O'Connor, Souter, Ginsburg	
	United States v. Fior D'Italia, Inc.	536 U.S. 238 (2002)		Rehnquist, Stevens, O'Connor, Kennedy, Ginsburg	
	Gonzaga University v. Doe	536 U.S. 273 (2002)		Souter	
	Utah v. Evans	536 U.S. 452 (2002)		Rehnquist, Stevens, Souter, Ginsburg; O'Connor (in part)	
	BE&K Construction Co. v. NLRB	536 U.S. 516 (2002)		Stevens, Souter, Ginsburg	
	Harris v. United States	536 U.S. 545 (2002)			
	Ring v. Arizona	536 U.S. 584 (2002)			
	United States v. Ruiz	536 U.S. 622 (2002)		Rehnquist, Stevens, O'Connor, Scalia, Kennedy, Souter, Ginsburg	
	Zelman v. Simmons-Harris	536 U.S. 639 (2002)		Stevens, Souter	
	Board of Ed. of Independent School Dist. No. 92 of Pottawatomie Cty. v. Earls	536 U.S. 822 (2002)			
