= 2001 term United States Supreme Court opinions of Antonin Scalia =

The 2001 term of the Supreme Court of the United States began October 1, 2001, and concluded October 6, 2002. This was the sixteenth term of Associate Justice Antonin Scalia's tenure on the Court.
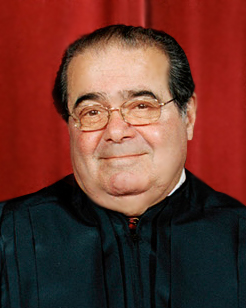

Antonin Scalia 2001 term statistics

8	Majority or plurality	10	Concurrence	1	Other
10	Dissent	0	Concurrence/dissent	Total =	29
Bench opinions = 27		Opinions relating to orders = 2		In-chambers opinions = 0
Unanimous opinions: 2		Most joined by: Thomas (19)		Least joined by: Ginsburg (3)

Type	Case	Citation	Issues	Joined by	Other opinions
	TRW Inc. v. Andrews	534 U.S. 19 (2001)		Thomas	
	Correctional Services Corp. v. Malesko	534 U.S. 61 (2001)		Thomas	
	J. E. M. Ag Supply, Inc. v. Pioneer Hi-Bred International, Inc.	534 U.S. 124 (2001)			
	Great-West Life & Annuity Ins. Co. v. Knudson	534 U.S. 204 (2002)		Rehnquist, O'Connor, Kennedy, Thomas	
	United States v. Arvizu	534 U.S. 266 (2002)			
	Thomas v. Chicago Park Dist.	534 U.S. 316 (2002)		Unanimous	
	Kansas v. Crane	534 U.S. 407 (2002)		Thomas	
	Owasso Independent School Dist. No. I-011 v. Falvo	534 U.S. 426 (2002)			
	Young v. United States	535 U.S. 43 (2002)		Unanimous	
	Mickens v. Taylor	535 U.S. 162 (2002)		Rehnquist, O'Connor, Kennedy, Thomas	
	Barnhart v. Walton	535 U.S. 212 (2002)			
	United States v. Craft	535 U.S. 274 (2002)		Thomas	
	US Airways, Inc. v. Barnett	535 U.S. 391 (2002)		Thomas	
	Los Angeles v. Alameda Books, Inc.	535 U.S. 425 (2002)			
	Verizon Md. Inc. v. Public Serv. Comm'n of Md.	535 U.S. 635 (2002)		Rehnquist, Stevens, Kennedy, Souter, Thomas, Ginsburg, Breyer	
	Alabama v. Shelton	535 U.S. 654 (2002)		Rehnquist, Kennedy, Thomas	
	Gisbrecht v. Barnhart	535 U.S. 789 (2002)			
	Holmes Group, Inc. v. Vornado Air Circulation Systems, Inc.	535 U.S. 826 (2002)		Rehnquist, Kennedy, Souter, Thomas, Breyer; Stevens (in part)	
	Moore v. Texas	535 U.S. 1044 (2002)	death penalty	Rehnquist, Thomas	
Scalia dissented from the Court’s orders granting the applications of two petitioners for stay of execution of sentence of death, pending the Court's decision in Atkins v. Virginia, on the issue of whether the Eighth Amendment permitted the execution of the intellectually disabled.
	Federal Rules of Criminal Procedure	535 U.S. 1157 (2002)	Criminal procedure • Confrontation Clause		
Scalia filed a statement noting that he agreed with the Court's decision not to transmit to Congress proposed amendments to Federal Rule of Criminal Procedure 26(b), which would have permitted witness testimony via two-way video transmission. Scalia believed this was of dubious constitutionality under the Confrontation Clause of the Sixth Amendment, according to the standard set forth in Maryland v. Craig. He wrote that he "cannot comprehend how one-way transmission (which Craig says does not ordinarily satisfy confrontation requirements) becomes transformed into full-fledged confrontation when reciprocal transmission is added. As we made clear in Craig...a purpose of the Confrontation Clause is ordinarily to compel accusers to make their accusations in the defendant’s presence—which is not equivalent to making them in a room that contains a television set beaming electrons that portray the defendant’s image. Virtual confrontation might be sufficient to protect virtual constitutional rights; I doubt whether it is sufficient to protect real ones."
	Devlin v. Scardelletti	536 U.S. 1 (2002)		Kennedy, Thomas	
	Watchtower Society v. Village of Stratton	536 U.S. 150 (2002)		Thomas	
	Barnes v. Gorman	536 U.S. 181 (2002)		Rehnquist, O'Connor, Kennedy, Souter, Thomas	
	Atkins v. Virginia	536 U.S. 304 (2002)		Rehnquist, Thomas	
	City of Columbus v. Ours Garage & Wrecker Service, Inc.	536 U.S. 424 (2002)		O'Connor	
	Utah v. Evans	536 U.S. 452 (2002)			
	BE&K Construction Co. v. NLRB	536 U.S. 516 (2002)		Thomas	
	Ring v. Arizona	536 U.S. 584 (2002)			
	Republican Party of Minnesota v. White	536 U.S. 765 (2002)	First Amendment	Rehnquist, O'Connor, Kennedy, Thomas	
