= 2001 term United States Supreme Court opinions of Sandra Day O'Connor =

The 2001 term of the Supreme Court of the United States began October 1, 2001, and concluded October 6, 2002. This was the twenty-first term of Associate Justice Sandra Day O'Connor's tenure on the Court.
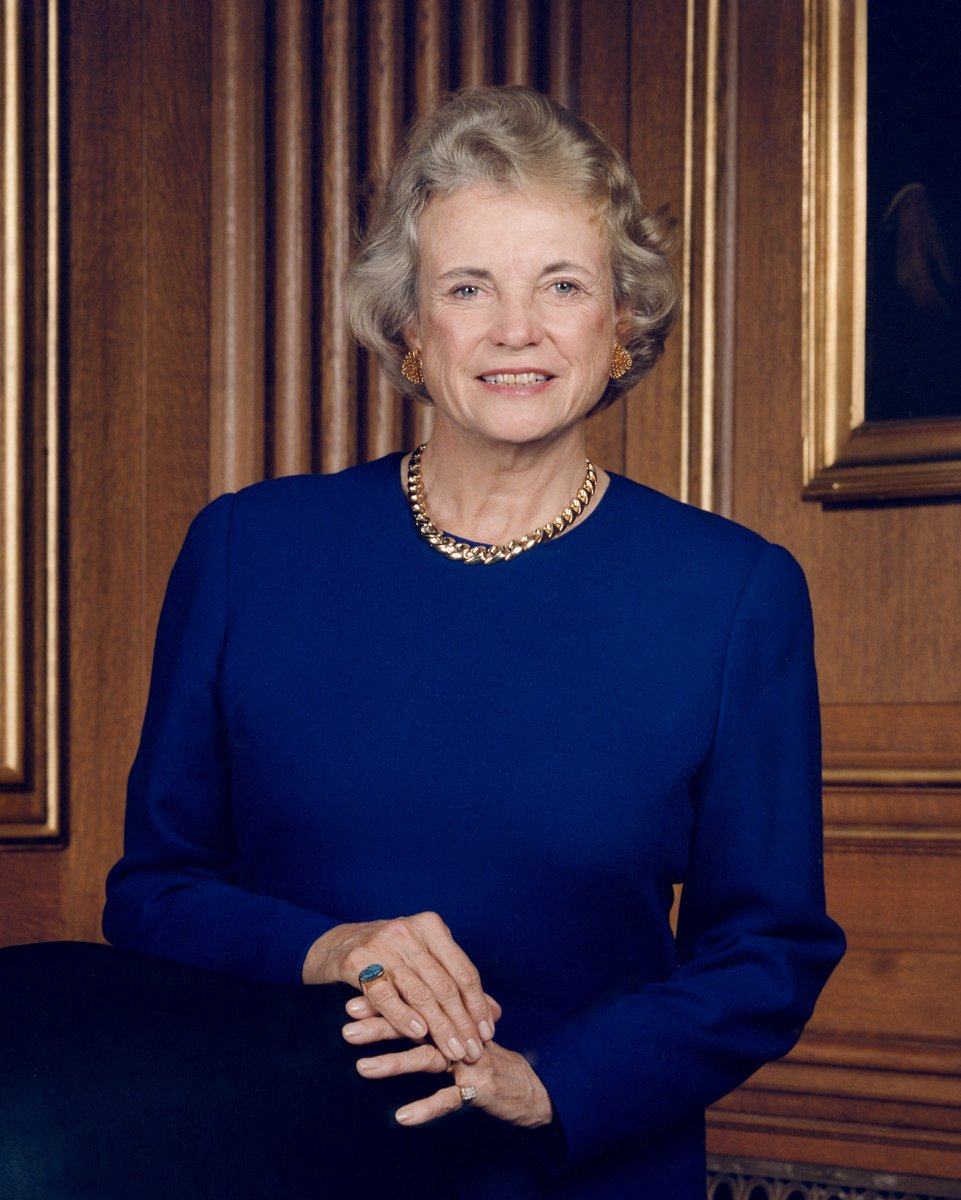

Sandra Day O'Connor 2001 term statistics

8	Majority or plurality	7	Concurrence	0	Other
4	Dissent	3	Concurrence/dissent	Total =	22
Bench opinions = 22		Opinions relating to orders = 0		In-chambers opinions = 0
Unanimous opinions: 1		Most joined by: Rehnquist (9)		Least joined by: Stevens (3)

Type	Case	Citation	Issues	Joined by	Other opinions
	United States Postal Service v. Gregory	534 U.S. 1 (2001)		Rehnquist, Stevens, Scalia, Kennedy, Souter, Thomas, Breyer	
	Chickasaw Nation v. United States	534 U.S. 84 (2001)		Souter	
	Toyota Motor Mfg., Ky., Inc. v. Williams	534 U.S. 184 (2002)		Unanimous	
	Raygor v. Regents of Univ. of Minn.	534 U.S. 533 (2002)		Rehnquist, Scalia, Kennedy, Thomas	
	Ragsdale v. Wolverine World Wide, Inc.	535 U.S. 81 (2002)		Souter, Ginsburg, Breyer	
	Edelman v. Lynchburg College	535 U.S. 106 (2002)		Scalia	
	Ashcroft v. Free Speech Coalition	535 U.S. 234 (2002)		Rehnquist, Scalia (in part)	
	United States v. Craft	535 U.S. 274 (2002)		Rehnquist, Kennedy, Souter, Ginsburg, Breyer	
	Thompson v. Western States Medical Center	535 U.S. 357 (2002)		Scalia, Kennedy, Souter, Thomas	
	US Airways, Inc. v. Barnett	535 U.S. 391 (2002)			
	Los Angeles v. Alameda Books, Inc.	535 U.S. 425 (2002)		Rehnquist, Scalia, Thomas	
	Ashcroft v. American Civil Liberties Union	535 U.S. 564 (2002)			
	Devlin v. Scardelletti	536 U.S. 1 (2002)		Rehnquist, Stevens, Souter, Ginsburg, Breyer	
	McKune v. Lile	536 U.S. 24 (2002)			
	National Railroad Passenger Corporation v. Morgan	536 U.S. 101 (2002)		Rehnquist, Scalia, Kennedy, Breyer (in part)	
	Utah v. Evans	536 U.S. 452 (2002)			
	BE&K Construction Co. v. NLRB	536 U.S. 516 (2002)		Rehnquist, Scalia, Kennedy, Thomas	
	Harris v. United States	536 U.S. 545 (2002)			
	Ring v. Arizona	536 U.S. 584 (2002)			
	Zelman v. Simmons-Harris	536 U.S. 639 (2002)			
	Republican Party of Minnesota v. White	536 U.S. 765 (2002)	First Amendment		
	Bd. of Ed. of Pottawatomie v. Earls	536 U.S. 822 (2002)	Fourth Amendment • drug testing in public schools	Souter	
