= 2001 term United States Supreme Court opinions of David Souter =

The 2001 term of the Supreme Court of the United States began October 1, 2001, and concluded October 6, 2002. This was the twelfth term of Associate Justice David Souter's tenure on the Court.
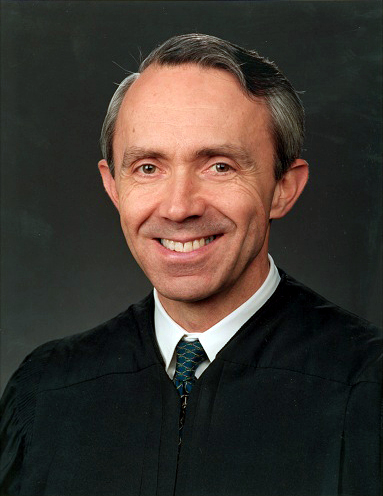

David Souter 2001 term statistics

8	Majority or plurality	3	Concurrence	0	Other
6	Dissent	0	Concurrence/dissent	Total =	17
Bench opinions = 17		Opinions relating to orders = 0		In-chambers opinions = 0
Unanimous opinions: 2		Most joined by: Ginsburg (13)		Least joined by: Rehnquist, Scalia, Kennedy, Thomas (6)

Type	Case	Citation	Issues	Joined by	Other opinions
	United States v. Knights (2001)	534 U.S. 112 (2001)			
	Kelly v. South Carolina	534 U.S. 246 (2002)		Stevens, O'Connor, Ginsburg, Breyer	
	United States v. Vonn	535 U.S. 55 (2002)		Rehnquist, O'Connor, Scalia, Kennedy, Thomas, Ginsburg, Breyer; Stevens (in part)	
	Edelman v. Lynchburg College	535 U.S. 106 (2002)		Rehnquist, Stevens, Kennedy, Thomas, Ginsburg, Breyer	
	Mickens v. Taylo	535 U.S. 162 (2002)			
	US Airways, Inc. v. Barnett	535 U.S. 391 (2002)		Ginsburg	
	Los Angeles v. Alameda Books, Inc.	535 U.S. 425 (2002)		Stevens, Ginsburg; Breyer (in part)	
	Verizon Communications Inc. v. FCC	535 U.S. 467 (2002)		Rehnquist, Stevens, Kennedy, Ginsburg; Scalia, Thomas (in part)	
	Verizon Md. Inc. v. Public Serv. Comm'n of Md.	535 U.S. 635 (2002)		Ginsburg, Breyer	
	Chevron U. S. A. Inc. v. Echazabal	535 U.S. 73 (2002)		Unanimous	
	JPMorgan Chase Bank v. Traffic Stream (BVI) Infrastructure Ltd.	536 U.S. 88 (2002)		Unanimous	
	Barnes v. Gorman	536 U.S. 181 (2002)		O'Connor	
	United States v. Drayton	536 U.S. 194 (2002)		Stevens, Ginsburg	
	United States v. Fior D'Italia, Inc.	536 U.S. 238 (2002)		Scalia, Thomas	
	Rush Prudential HMO, Inc. v. Moran	536 U.S. 355 (2002)		Stevens, O'Connor, Ginsburg, Breyer	
	Christopher v. Harbury	536 U.S. 403 (2002)		Rehnquist, Stevens, O'Connor, Scalia, Kennedy, Ginsburg, Breyer	
	Zelman v. Simmons-Harris	536 U.S. 639 (2002)		Stevens, Ginsburg, Breyer	
