= 2001 term United States Supreme Court opinions of Anthony Kennedy =

The 2001 term of the Supreme Court of the United States began October 1, 2001, and concluded October 6, 2002. This was the fifteenth term of Associate Justice Anthony Kennedy's tenure on the Court.
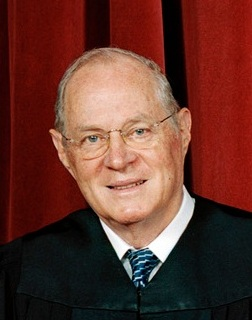

Anthony Kennedy 2001 term statistics

8	Majority or plurality	6	Concurrence	0	Other
3	Dissent	0	Concurrence/dissent	Total =	17
Bench opinions = 16		Opinions relating to orders = 1		In-chambers opinions = 0
Unanimous opinions: 1		Most joined by: Rehnquist, Scalia, Thomas (8)		Least joined by: Stevens (4)

Type	Case	Citation	Issues	Joined by	Other opinions
	National Cable & Telecommunications Assn., Inc. v. Gulf Power Co.	534 U.S. 327 (2002)		Rehnquist, Stevens, Scalia, Ginsburg, Breyer; Souter, Thomas (in part)	
	Lee v. Kemna	534 U.S. 362 (2002)		Scalia, Thomas	
	Owasso Independent School Dist. No. I-011 v. Falvo	534 U.S. 426 (2002)		Rehnquist, Stevens, O'Connor, Souter, Thomas, Ginsburg, Breyer	
	Ragsdale v. Wolverine World Wide, Inc.	535 U.S. 81 (2002)		Rehnquist, Stevens, Scalia, Thomas	
	Mickens v. Taylor	535 U.S. 162 (2002)		O'Connor	
	Ashcroft v. Free Speech Coalition	535 U.S. 234 (2002)		Stevens, Souter, Ginsburg, Breyer	
	Los Angeles v. Alameda Books, Inc.	535 U.S. 425 (2002)			
	Ashcroft v. American Civil Liberties Union	535 U.S. 564 (2002)		Souter, Ginsburg	
	Verizon Md. Inc. v. Public Serv. Comm'n of Md.	535 U.S. 635 (2002)			
	Festo Corp. v. Shoketsu Kinzoku Kogyo Kabushiki Co.	535 U.S. 722 (2002)		Unanimous	
	McKune v. Lile	536 U.S. 24 (2002)		Rehnquist, Scalia, Thomas	
	United States v. Drayton	536 U.S. 194 (2002)		Rehnquist, O'Connor, Scalia, Thomas, Breyer	
	Carey v. Saffold	536 U.S. 214 (2002)		Rehnquist, Scalia, Thomas	
	Harris v. United States	536 U.S. 545 (2002)		Rehnquist, O'Connor, Scalia; Breyer (in part)	
	Ring v. Arizona	536 U.S. 584 (2002)			
	Republican Party of Minnesota v. White	536 U.S. 765 (2002)			
	Trans Union LLC v. FTC	536 U.S. 915 (2002)	Commercial speech	O'Connor	
Kennedy dissented from the Court's denial of certiorari, in a case involving the prohibition under 15 U.S.C. § 1681 on the sale of consumer reports. The lower court had upheld the FTC's application of this prohibition to targeted marketing lists published by a credit reporting company.
