= Tecumseh High School =

Tecumseh High School can refer to:

- Tecumseh High School (Indiana) in Lynnville, Indiana
- Tecumseh High School (Michigan) in Tecumseh, Michigan
- Tecumseh High School (New Carlisle, Ohio)
- Tecumseh High School (Oklahoma) in Tecumseh, Oklahoma
