= Mueller v. Allen =

- Supreme Court of the United States

Argued April 18, 1983 Decided June 29, 1983
- Full case name: Mueller v. Allen
- Citations: 463 U.S. 388 (more) 103 S. Ct. 3062; 77 L. Ed. 2d 721; 1983 U.S. LEXIS 96
- Argument: Oral argument

Case history
- Prior: 514 F. Supp. 998 (D. Minn. 1981); affirmed, 676 F.2d 1195 (8th Cir. 1982); cert. granted, 459 U.S. 820 (1982).

Holding
- A state income tax deduction that is available for expenses incurred in sending children to both public and private schools does not violate the Establishment Clause even if it can be used for religious schools.

Court membership
- Chief Justice Warren E. Burger Associate Justices William J. Brennan Jr. · Byron White; Thurgood Marshall · Harry Blackmun; Lewis F. Powell Jr. · William Rehnquist; John P. Stevens · Sandra Day O'Connor

Case opinions
- Majority: Rehnquist, joined by Burger, White, Powell, O'Connor
- Dissent: Marshall, joined by Brennan, Blackmun, Stevens

Laws applied
- First Amendment

Mueller v. Allen, 463 U.S. 388 (1983), was a United States Supreme Court case examining the constitutionality of a state tax deduction granted to taxpaying parents for school-related expenses, including expenses incurred from private secular and religious schools. The plaintiffs claimed that a Minnesota statute, allowing tax deductions for both public and private school expenses, subsidized religious instruction since parents who paid tuition to religious schools received a larger deduction than parents of public school students, who incurred no tuition expenses.

In a 5–4 decision, the Court upheld the statute. The majority affirmed that the benefit was religiously neutral because the deduction applied equally to sectarian and nonsectarian tuition and that the choice of religious or nonreligious instruction was made by individual parents, not the state. Also, aid was given to parents, not schools.

The dissenting opinion argued that the tax deduction violated the US Constitution because it was an indirect government subsidy of religion, providing a financial incentive to parents to send their children to religious schools.

== Background ==
The First Amendment of the US Constitution prohibits laws advancing the establishment of any religion. Any government-sponsored religious instruction is thus barred. Prior to the adoption of the Fourteenth Amendment, the Supreme Court's reviews of First Amendment disputes were minimal because the court maintained jurisdiction to consider only challenges against laws passed at the federal level.

Everson v. Board of Education (1947) was the first case decided by the Court to apply the Establishment Clause prohibition to state laws. The decision in Everson established two criteria to judge state legislation: the action must have a secular purpose, and that purpose must be the primary effect of the action. Following a 1971 decision by the Supreme Court, a third condition was incorporated. The resulting three-pronged test, called Lemon test, prescribes that for any governmental policy or legislation to satisfy the Establishment Clause, it must have a secular purpose, its primary effect must not the advancement or inhibition of religion, and it must not create an excessive entanglement between religion and government.

In Mueller, the plaintiff claimed that the primary effect of the Minnesota law was the advancement of religion since most taxpayers who benefited from the legislation were parents paying their children's tuition to private religious schools.

== Majority opinion ==
Justice Rehnquist delivered the majority opinion, which affirmed the decisions of the United States District Court for the District of Minnesota and the United States Court of Appeals for the Eighth Circuit that the Minnesota statute (§ 290.09, subd. 22) was constitutional. The law allowed state taxpayers to a state income tax deduction for any expenses toward their children's school tuition, textbooks, and transportation. The deduction was limited to $500 per student in elementary school and $700 per student in middle school and high school. The statute excluded deducting any expenses for "instructional books and materials used in the teaching of religious tenets, doctrines or worship, the purpose of which is to inculcate such tenets, doctrines or worship."

The plaintiffs were unsuccessful in contending that the tax deduction provided financial assistance to religious schools and that to assure no deduction was made for textbooks containing religious teachings, the state became excessively entangled with religion.

Rehnquist noted that the statute was facially neutral on religion and rejected the plaintiff's argument that its religious partiality was evidenced by the fact that 96% of the private schools in Minnesota were sectarian institutions.

== Dissenting opinion ==
Justice Marshall wrote the dissenting opinion, agreed to by three other justices. The tax credits were available to all parents, but, in practice, the chief benefit went to parents whose children attended parochial schools. "Parents who send their children to free public schools are simply ineligible to obtain the full benefit of the deduction except in the unlikely event that they buy $700 worth of pencils, notebooks, and bus rides for their children." As the First Amendment was concerned, Marshall added, a tax credit did not differ from a direct grant to parents, which had already been found unconstitutional.

== Aftermath ==
Mueller v. Allen marked a turning point for the Establishment Clause, and for the next 20 years the Supreme Court ruled more favorably if governments fostered aid. The court upheld benefits that were deemed to be religiously neutral and were extended to all equally, even if they were favorable to individuals in exercising their privately held religious interests. The Court became disinclined to overturn laws that did not disqualify religiously based interests if the direct beneficiaries of the legislation in question were individuals, rather than religiously affiliated institutions.

Following Mueller, private choice was a key element extended to subsequent Establishment Clause court decisions over government sponsored school vouchers, the most significant one being Zelman v. Simmons-Harris (2002). While direct aid was funneled instead to religious schools, the court focused instead on whether or not the policies at issue provided sufficient controls to ensure the assistance was not directed to religious instruction and that the policies did not lead to forbidden entanglements between the government and any religious institution.

== Related cases ==
- Everson v. Board of Education (1947)
- Board of Education v. Allen (1968)
- Lemon v. Kurtzman (1971)
- Zelman v. Simmons-Harris (2002)
- Espinoza v. Montana Department of Revenue (2020)

== See also ==
- Free Exercise Clause
- Endorsement test
