= Correctional Services Corporation =

Correctional Services Corporation (CSC), originally Esmor Correctional Corporation, was a correctional firm founded by James F. Slattery in 1987. It was located in Sarasota, Florida, US, and traded on the NASDAQ (NASDAQ NMS:CSCQ). It had been a corporation specializing in the privatization of correctional facilities for federal, state, and local agencies housing adults, juveniles, and Department Of Homeland Security prisoners.

Much of the CSC's profits were allegedly based on high crime rates, as hinted in a 2002 statement by James F. Slattery: "Increases in parole rates combined with economic slowdowns traditionally lead to an increased need for correctional services," he said. "We believe this historical pattern will be repeated, and its effect felt in 2002 and beyond."

The New York State Lobbying Commission fined Correctional Services Corp. $300,000 for purchasing votes in the state legislature.

In 2005, CSC was sold to GEO Group for $62.1 million. GEO then divested the youth portion of the enterprise, Youth Services International (YSI), back to its principals. According to a 2013 HuffPost investigation, inmates held in facilities run by YSI "have frequently faced beatings, neglect, sexual abuse and unsanitary food over the past two decades."

Due to audits findings of overcharges and reports of continuing abuse, the State of Florida cancelled its existing contracts with YSI, the remaining functional operation of CSC. The corporation was required to reimburse the state for $2,000,000 in overcharges.

== Principals ==
- Chairman: Stuart M. Gerson
- President & Chief Executive: James F. Slattery

== See also ==
- Correctional Services Corporation v. Malesko
