= HIH Casualty and General Insurance Ltd v Chase Manhattan Bank =

HIH Ltd v Chase Manhattan Bank
- Court: House of Lords
- Decided: 20 February 2003
- Citations: [2003] UKHL 6; 1 All ER (Comm) 349 [2003] 2 LLR 61 [2003] Lloyds Rep IR 230 [2004] ICR 1708 [2003] 1 CLC 358 [2003] 2 Lloyd's Rep 61

Case history
- Prior action: [2002] EWCA Civ 1250

Court membership
- Judges sitting: Lord Bingham; Lord Steyn; Lord Hoffmann; Lord Hobhouse; Lord Scott

Keywords
- Misrepresentation, Fraud, exclusion clauses

HIH Casualty and General Insurance Ltd v Chase Manhattan Bank [2003] UKHL 6 is an English contract law case concerning misrepresentation.

== Facts ==
Chase Manhattan Bank was in the highly speculative business of lending money against receipts from five future movies (in this case, Amy Foster, U Turn, Apt Pupil, The Mirror Has Two Faces and The People vs. Larry Flynt). The bank wanted to protect against its substantial risk. So it took out a policy of insurance with HIH Insurance. Intermediaries who knew about movies, much more than either the bank or the insurer, negotiated. The bank made a claim for insurance cover. HIH resisted the bank's claim and in doing so alleged misrepresentations, both negligent and fraudulent, by the bank’s agents (not the bank itself). The insurance contract contained disclaimers for misrepresentations by the bank. One issue was whether the disclaimers could absolve the bank of liability for misrepresentation.

== Judgment ==
All of the judges except Lord Steyn gave a speech. The majority of the House of Lords (Lord Bingham, Lord Steyn, Lord Hoffmann, Lord Hobhouse) held the disclaimers could exclude liability for negligent misrepresentation, but not for fraud, were it established. One could exclude liability for someone else's fraud, but not for one's own. They said that to try to exclude liability for one's own fraud would be contrary to public policy.

Lord Bingham said:

11. In submitting that phrase [6] does not deny the insurers their usual legal remedies for negligent misrepresentation by Heaths, the insurers drew sustenance from the well-known principles propounded by Lord Morton of Henryton giving the judgment of the Board in Canada Steamship Lines Ltd v The King [1952] AC 192 at 208. There can be no doubting the general authority of these principles, which have been applied in many cases, and the approach indicated is sound. The courts should not ordinarily infer that a contracting party has given up rights which the law confers upon him to an extent greater than the contract terms indicate he has chosen to do; and if the contract terms can take legal and practical effect without denying him the rights he would ordinarily enjoy if the other party is negligent, they will be read as not denying him those rights unless they are so expressed as to make clear that they do. But, as the insurers in argument fully recognised, Lord Morton was giving helpful guidance on the proper approach to interpretation and not laying down a code. The passage does not provide a litmus test which, applied to the terms of the contract, yields a certain and predictable result. The courts' task of ascertaining what the particular parties intended, in their particular commercial context, remains.

Lord Scott dissented.

In the case of Biffa Waste Services v MEH (2008), Lord Ramsey observed that the guidelines established in Canada Steamship Lines v The King had been emphasised by Bingham to be "helpful guidance on the proper approach to interpretation and not laying down a code ...".

== See also ==
- English contract law
- Misrepresentation in English law
- JPMorgan Chase Bank v. Traffic Stream (BVI) Infrastructure Ltd.
