= List of United States Supreme Court cases, volume 536 =

This is a list of all United States Supreme Court cases from volume 536 of the United States Reports:

Case name	Citation	Date decided
Devlin v. Scardelletti	536 U.S. 1	2002
McKune v. Lile	536 U.S. 24	2002
Chevron U.S.A. Inc. v. Echazabal	536 U.S. 73	2002
JPMorgan Chase Bank v. Traffic Stream (BVI) Infrastructure Ltd.	536 U.S. 88	2002
Nat'l R.R. Passenger Corp. v. Morgan	536 U.S. 101	2002
Franconia Associates v. United States	536 U.S. 129	2002
Watchtower Bible & Tract Soc'y v. Village of Stratton	536 U.S. 150	2002
Barnes v. Gorman	536 U.S. 181	2002
United States v. Drayton	536 U.S. 194	2002
Carey v. Saffold	536 U.S. 214	2002
United States v. Fior D'Italia, Inc.	536 U.S. 238	2002
Horn v. Banks	536 U.S. 266	2002
Gonzaga Univ. v. Doe	536 U.S. 273	2002
Atkins v. Virginia	536 U.S. 304	2002
Rush Prudential HMO, Inc. v. Moran	536 U.S. 355	2002
Christopher v. Harbury	536 U.S. 403	2002
City of Columbus v. Ours Garage & Wrecker Serv., Inc.	536 U.S. 424	2002
Utah v. Evans	536 U.S. 452	2002
BE&K Constr. Co. v. NLRB	536 U.S. 516	2002
Harris v. United States	536 U.S. 545	2002
The Sixth Amendment does not require a jury determination of facts necessary to support the minimum punishment for using or carrying a firearm during or in relation to a drug crime or a crime of violence under 18 U.S.C. § 924.
Ring v. Arizona	536 U.S. 584	2002
United States v. Ruiz	536 U.S. 622	2002
Kirk v. Louisiana	536 U.S. 635	2002
Zelman v. Simmons-Harris	536 U.S. 639	2002
Hope v. Pelzer	536 U.S. 730	2002
Republican Party v. White	536 U.S. 765	2002
Board of Education v. Earls	536 U.S. 822	2002
A school district requiring drug testing for students who choose to engage in extracurricular activities does not violate the Fourth Amendment.
Stewart v. Smith	536 U.S. 856	June 28, 2002
United States v. Bass	536 U.S. 862	2002
