= 2001 term per curiam opinions of the Supreme Court of the United States =

The Supreme Court of the United States handed down nine per curiam opinions during its 2001 term, which began October 1, 2001, and concluded October 6, 2002.

Because per curiam decisions are issued from the Court as an institution, these opinions all lack the attribution of authorship or joining votes to specific justices. All justices on the Court at the time the decision was handed down are assumed to have participated and concurred unless otherwise noted.

== Court membership ==
Chief Justice: William Rehnquist

Associate Justices: John Paul Stevens, Sandra Day O'Connor, Antonin Scalia, Anthony Kennedy, David Souter, Clarence Thomas, Ruth Bader Ginsburg, Stephen Breyer

== Adarand Constructors, Inc. v. Mineta ==
- Full caption: Adarand Constructors, Inc. v. Norman Y. Mineta, Secretary of Transportation, et al.
- Citations: 534 U.S. 103
- Prior history: Adarand Constructors, Inc. v. Peña, 515 U.S. 200 (1995) (Adarand I); on remand, 965 F. Supp. 1556 (D. Colo. 1997); vacated, sub nom. Adarand Constructors, Inc. v. Slater, 169 F. 3d 1292 (10th Cir. 1999); rev'd, 528 U.S. 216 (2000); aff'd in part, 228 F. 3d 1147 (10th Cir. 2000); cert. granted, 532 U.S. 941 (2001)
- Full text of the opinion: official slip opinion

534 U.S. 103
Argued October 31, 2001.
Decided November 27, 2001.
The Court dismissed the writ of certiorari as improvidently granted.

== Sao Paulo State of Federative Republic of Brazil v. American Tobacco Co. ==
- Full caption: Sao Paulo State of the Federative Republic of Brazil v. American Tobacco Co., Inc., et al.
- Citations: 535 U.S. 229
- Prior history: Motion for disqualification denied, Minute Entry in Civ. Action Nos. 00–0922, 98–3279 (E.D. La., May 26, 2000); rev'd, sub nom. Republic of Panama v. American Tobacco Co., 250 F. 3d 315 (5th Cir. 2001) (per curiam); rehearing en banc denied, 265 F. 3d 299 (5th Cir. 2001)
- Full text of the opinion: official slip opinion

535 U.S. 229
Decided April 1, 2002.
Fifth Circuit reversed and remanded.

In a tobacco-products liability suit brought by a foreign state against an American cigarette manufacturer, the Fifth Circuit held that 28 U.S.C. § 455(a) required the disqualification of the trial court judge because his name had appeared, albeit erroneously, prior to his appointment to the bench, on a motion to file an amicus curiae brief in a similar suit against some of the same defendants. The motion was submitted by an organization of which the judge had been president, but from which he had retired six months prior to its filing. The judge accordingly refused to disqualify himself because his name appeared in error on the motion to file the amicus brief and because he took no part in preparation or approval of the brief. The Fifth Circuit, however, ruled that his explanation would not "dissipate the doubts that a reasonable person would probably have about the court’s impartiality."

The Supreme Court reversed, finding the Fifth Circuit's decision inconsistent with Liljeberg v. Health Services Acquisition Corp., 486 U.S. 847 (1988), which stated that §455(a) requires judicial recusal "if a reasonable person, knowing all the circumstances, would expect that the judge would have actual knowledge" of his interest or bias in the case. The Court characterized the Fifth Circuit's decision as based on what "a reasonable person would believe without knowing (or giving due weight to the fact) that the judge’s name was added mistakenly and without his knowledge to a pro forma motion to file an amicus brief in a separate controversy."

== Mathias v. WorldCom Technologies, Inc. ==
- Full caption: Richard L. Mathias, et al. v. Worldcom Technologies, Inc., et al.
- Citations: 535 U.S. 682
- Full text of the opinion: official slip opinion · Justia

535 U.S. 682
Argued December 5, 2001.
Decided May 20, 2002.
The Court dismissed the writ of certiorari as improvidently granted.

The Court dismissed the writ of certiorari following full briefing and oral argument, determining that the petitioners were the prevailing parties below, and sought review of findings that were not essential to the judgment and not binding upon them in future litigation. The Court stated that "[a]s a general rule, a party may not appeal from a favorable judgment simply to obtain review of findings it deems erroneous." The Court noted that it had since granted certiorari in another case that arose in the same factual context to review the same issues.

O'Connor did not participate.

== Horn v. Banks ==
- Full caption: Martin Horn, Commissioner, Pennsylvania Department of Corrections, et al. v. George E. Banks
- Citations: 536 U.S. 266
- Prior history: Petition denied, 63 F. Supp. 2d 525 (M.D. Penn. 1999); rev'd in part, 271 F. 3d 527 (3d Cir. 2001).
- Full text of the opinion: official slip opinion

536 U.S. 266
Decided June 17, 2002.
Third Circuit reversed and remanded.

== Kirk v. Louisiana ==
- Full caption: Kennedy D. Kirk v. Louisiana
- Citations: 536 U.S. 635
- Prior history: Motion to suppress evidence denied; defendant convicted and sentenced; aff'd, 773 So. 2d 259 (La. Ct. App. 2000); review denied, La.
- Full text of the opinion: official slip opinion

536 U.S. 635
Decided June 24, 2002.
Court of Appeal of Louisiana, Fourth Circuit, reversed and remanded.

== Stewart v. Smith ==
- Full caption: Terry L. Stewart, Director, Arizona Department of Corrections v. Robert Douglas Smith
- Citations: 536 U.S. 856
- Prior history: Petition denied, D. Ariz.; rev'd, 241 F. 3d 1191 (9th Cir. 2001); cert. granted, question certified, 534 U.S. 157 (2001); reply to certified question, 46 P. 3d 1067 (Ariz. 2002)
- Full text of the opinion: official slip opinion

536 U.S. 856
Decided June 28, 2002.
Ninth Circuit reversed and remanded.

== United States v. Bass ==
- Full caption: United States v. John Bass
- Citations: 536 U.S. 862
- Prior history: Motion for discovery granted, E.D. Mich.; aff'd, 266 F. 3d 532 (6th Cir. 2001)
- Full text of the opinion: official slip opinion

536 U.S. 862
Decided June 28, 2002.
Sixth Circuit reversed.

== See also ==
- List of United States Supreme Court cases, volume 534
- List of United States Supreme Court cases, volume 535
- List of United States Supreme Court cases, volume 536
