= Tecumseh High School (Oklahoma) =

Coordinates: 35.268327°N 96.947994°W

- Tecumseh Savages athletic logo
- 901 North 13th Street; Tecumseh, Pottawatomie County, Oklahoma 74873; United States

Information
- School type: Secondary
- School district: Tecumseh Public Schools
- Superintendent: Robert Kinsey
- Principal: Jaime Griggs
- Teaching staff: 40.78 (on an FTE basis)
- Grades: 9–12
- Enrollment: 646 (2023–2024)
- Student to teacher ratio: 15.84
- Colors: Black and gold
- Mascot: Savage
- Rivals: Seminole High School, McLoud High School, Harrah High School, Meeker High School, Bethel High School
- Information: (405) 598-2113
- Website: Tecumseh High School

Tecumseh High School is a high school located in Tecumseh, Oklahoma roughly 42 miles East of Oklahoma City. The school's mascot is the Savage. Tecumseh High School serves approximately 659 students in grades 9–12. They have a 41% minority enrollment and a graduation rate of 90–94%.

== Athletics ==
Tecumseh High School students participate in Baseball, Cross Country, Fast Pitch and Slow Pitch Softball, Track and Field, Basketball, American Football, Powerlifting, Volleyball, Golf, Wrestling, Cheerleading, Bowling, Marching Band, and Colorguard. They are classified mainly in 4A in their larger sports by the Oklahoma Secondary School Activities Association (OSSAA).

=== Basketball ===
In 1993, the Lady Savage Basketball Team won the school's first and only Team State Championship by defeating Milwood, 42–34, to win the 3A State Championship at the Oklahoma State Fairgrounds. Westervelt went on to play College Basketball at Oklahoma State.

== Tecumseh High School Alumni Association ==
Tecumseh High School's alumni association claims to be Oklahoma's oldest active association. The group has met yearly since 1903 and has never missed a beat until the COVID-19 Pandemic of 2020 where they were forced to cancel in 2020 and again in 2021 due to the safety and health of their alumni friends and family. The group publishes a 20-page newspaper each May, which is sent to more than 4,000 graduates.

== Alumni ==
- Mary Fallin – governor of Oklahoma
- Patrick Cobbs – NFL running back

== See also ==
- Board of Education v. Earls
