= Swierkiewicz v. Sorema N. A. =

- Supreme Court of the United States

Argued January 15, 2002 Decided February 26, 2002
- Full case name: Akos Swierkiewicz, Petitioner v. Sorema N. A.
- Docket no.: 00-1853
- Citations: 534 U.S. 506 (more) 122 S. Ct. 992; 152 L. Ed. 2d 1; 2002 U.S. LEXIS 1374

Court membership
- Chief Justice William Rehnquist Associate Justices John P. Stevens · Sandra Day O'Connor; Antonin Scalia · Anthony Kennedy; David Souter · Clarence Thomas; Ruth Bader Ginsburg · Stephen Breyer

Case opinion
- Majority: Thomas, joined by unanimous

Laws applied
- Federal Rules of Civil Procedure

Swierkiewicz v. Sorema N. A., 534 U.S. 506 (2002), was a case decided by the Supreme Court of the United States on February 26, 2002. The Court held that for complaints in employment discrimination cases, a plaintiff is not required to allege specific facts that establish a prima facie case as required by the McDonnell Douglas burden-shifting framework.

== Background ==
Plaintiff brought suit against his former employer, alleging wrongful termination due to his national origin and age, in violation of Title VII of the Civil Rights Act of 1964 and the Age Discrimination in Employment Act of 1967. The District Court dismissed the complaint, finding that plaintiff failed to establish a prima facie case because he failed to allege facts that would support an inference of discrimination. The United States Court of Appeals for the Second Circuit affirmed, holding that plaintiff did not meet his burden set forth in the McDonnell Douglas framework. Plaintiff then appealed to the Supreme Court. An amicus brief was filed by the National Employment Lawyers Association, AARP, American Civil Liberties Union, National Partnership for Women & Families, National Women’s Law Center, and NOW Legal Defense and Education Fund.

== Decision ==
In a unanimous decision delivered by Justice Thomas, the Court reversed, holding that “an employment discrimination complaint need not include such facts and instead must contain only ‘a short and plain statement of the claim showing that the pleader is entitled to relief.’ Fed. Rule Civ. Proc. 8(a)(2).” The Court also stated that the required prima facie case in the McDonnell Douglas burden-shifting framework is a “flexible evidentiary standard” instead of a “rigid pleading requirement.”

== See also ==
- Age Discrimination in Employment Act of 1967
- Civil rights
- Employment law
- Federal Rules of Civil Procedure
- List of United States Supreme Court cases, volume 534
- Title VII of the Civil Rights Act of 1964
