= JPMorgan Chase Bank v. Traffic Stream (BVI) Infrastructure Ltd. =

- Supreme Court of the United States

Argued April 17, 2002 Decided June 10, 2002
- Full case name: JPMorgan Chase Bank, Petitioner v. Traffic Stream (BVI) Infrastructure Limited
- Citations: 536 U.S. 88 (more) 122 S. Ct. 2054; 153 L. Ed. 2d 95; 2002 U.S. LEXIS 4203; 70 U.S.L.W. 4520; 197 A.L.R. Fed. 619; 2002 Cal. Daily Op. Service 5034; 2002 Daily Journal DAR 6353; 15 Fla. L. Weekly Fed. S 359

Case history
- Prior: On writ of certiorari to the United States Court of Appeals for the Second Circuit

Court membership
- Chief Justice William Rehnquist Associate Justices John P. Stevens · Sandra Day O'Connor; Antonin Scalia · Anthony Kennedy; David Souter · Clarence Thomas; Ruth Bader Ginsburg · Stephen Breyer

Case opinion
- Majority: Souter, joined by unanimous

JPMorgan Chase Bank v. Traffic Stream (BVI) Infrastructure Ltd., 536 U.S. 88 (2002), was a case in which the Supreme Court of the United States held that a corporation organized under the laws of a British overseas territory is considered a "citizen or subject of a foreign state" for purposes of federal court jurisdiction.

== Background ==
Chase Manhattan Bank (which later became JP Morgan Chase) sued Traffic Stream (BVI) Infrastructure Ltd., a company incorporated in the British Virgin Islands, in a dispute over a financing. Chase filed the suit in the United States District Court for the Southern District of New York. Federal jurisdiction was based on alienage under 28 U.S.C. § 1332(a)(3), in that the suit was between a United States company and a "citizen or subject of a foreign state." The District Court ruled for Chase, and Traffic Stream appealed.

Although no jurisdictional issue had been raised in the District Court, on appeal the Second Circuit inquired sua sponte whether federal subject-matter jurisdiction existed over the action. The Second Circuit concluded that jurisdiction was lacking. The court reasoned that since the British Virgin Islands are a dependent territory rather than a "foreign state," a British Virgin Islands corporation was not a "citizen or subject of a foreign state." The Second Circuit panel relied on the Circuit's prior Matimak decision, which had reached the same conclusion concerning a citizen of Hong Kong prior to the transfer of Hong Kong from British to Chinese sovereignty.

Traffic Stream petitioned the U.S. Supreme Court for certiorari, with the support of an amicus curiae brief from the government of the United Kingdom. The Court agreed to hear the case.

== Opinion of the Court ==
Justice David H. Souter wrote the opinion for a unanimous Court, reversing the Second Circuit's decision and holding that a British Virgin Islands company like Traffic Stream was properly considered a "citizen or subject of a foreign state" for jurisdictional purposes.

The Court observed that Congress has authorized the federal courts to hear civil actions involving more than $75,000 between "citizens of a State and citizens or subjects of a foreign state." A corporation incorporated under the laws of a foreign state is deemed a citizen of that foreign state. The Second Circuit's view was that because the British Virgin Islands are a British dependent territory rather than a sovereign state under British and international law, a British Virgin Islands company was not a citizen or subject of a foreign state for purposes of alienage jurisdiction.

The Supreme Court disagreed, finding the distinction drawn by the Second Circuit to be "entirely beside the point of the statute providing alienage jurisdiction." After surveying the political status of British territories such as the British Virgin Islands, as well as the constitutional and statutory history of alienage jurisdiction, the Court held that a British Virgin Islands corporation could be considered a citizen or subject of a sovereign state, the United Kingdom. The fact that British Virgin Islands residents are not citizens or subjects of the United Kingdom under British nationality law, the Court held, did not negate that they are citizens or subjects of a foreign state for purposes of the alienage jurisdiction statute. The Court also observed that its decision was consistent with the views of the governments of the United Kingdom, the British Virgin Islands, and the United States.

== See also ==
- HIH Casualty and General Insurance Ltd v Chase Manhattan Bank
