= Correctional Services Corp. v. Malesko =

Correctional Services Corporation v. Malesko
- Supreme Court of the United States

Argued October 1, 2001 Decided November 27, 2001
- Full case name: Correctional Services Corporation v. Malesko
- Citations: 534 U.S. 61 (more) 122 S. Ct. 515; 151 L. Ed. 2d 456

Case history
- Prior: 229 F.3d 374 (2d Cir. 2000); cert. granted, 532 U.S. 902 (2001).

Court membership
- Chief Justice William Rehnquist Associate Justices John P. Stevens · Sandra Day O'Connor; Antonin Scalia · Anthony Kennedy; David Souter · Clarence Thomas; Ruth Bader Ginsburg · Stephen Breyer

Case opinions
- Majority: Rehnquist, joined by O'Connor, Scalia, Kennedy, Thomas
- Concurrence: Scalia, joined by Thomas
- Dissent: Stevens, joined by Souter, Ginsburg, Breyer

Correctional Services Corporation v. Malesko, 534 U.S. 61 (2001), was a case decided by the United States Supreme Court, in which the Court found that implied damages actions first recognized in Bivens v. Six Unknown Named Agents should not be extended to allow recovery against a private corporation operating a halfway house under contract with the Bureau of Prisons.

A Bivens action is a civil rights violation suit against the government. The Supreme Court limited this court-invented private right of action to exclude corporate defendants like Correctional Services Corporation. Plaintiff's actions against the individual employees were barred by the statute of limitations because the names of the John Doe defendant prison guards (esp. Jorge Urena) were not known to the plaintiff.

== See also ==
- List of United States Supreme Court cases, volume 534
- List of United States Supreme Court cases
