= Chickasaw Nation v. United States =

- Supreme Court of the United States

Argued October 2, 2001 Decided November 27, 2001
- Full case name: Chickasaw Nation v. United States; and Choctaw Nation of Oklahoma v. United States
- Docket no.: 00-507
- Citations: 534 U.S. 84 (more) 122 S. Ct. 528; 151 L. Ed. 2d 474

Case history
- Prior: Chickasaw Nation v. United States, 208 F.3d 871 (10th Cir. 2000) (first judgment); Choctaw Nation of Oklahoma v. United States, 210 F.3d 389 (10th Cir. 2000) (second judgment); cert. granted, 531 U.S. 1124 (2001).

Holding
- Indian tribes were liable for taxes on gambling operations under 25 U.S.C. §§ 2701–2721.

Court membership
- Chief Justice William Rehnquist Associate Justices John P. Stevens · Sandra Day O'Connor; Antonin Scalia · Anthony Kennedy; David Souter · Clarence Thomas; Ruth Bader Ginsburg · Stephen Breyer

Case opinions
- Majority: Breyer, joined by Rehnquist, Stevens, Kennedy, Ginsburg; Scalia, Thomas (all but Part II-B)
- Dissent: O'Connor, joined by Souter

Laws applied
- Indian Gaming Regulatory Act, 25 U.S.C. §§ 2701–2721

Chickasaw Nation v. United States, 534 U.S. 84 (2001), was a case in which the Supreme Court of the United States held that Indian tribes were liable for taxes on gambling operations under 25 U.S.C. §§ 2701–2721.

== Background ==
The Chickasaw Nation operated several business, and used a pull-tab, similar to a scratch-off lottery ticket, to generate revenue for the tribe. The Internal Revenue Service (IRS) advised the tribe that the tribe owed excise taxes and federal occupational taxes on revenue generated from the sales of these pull-tabs to the public. The tribe paid the amount sought by the IRS and then filed a claim for reimbursement, averring that the tribe was exempt from such taxes under the provisions of Indian Gaming Regulatory Act (IGRA), 25 U.S.C. §§ 2701–2721. The United States denied the claim, and the tribe filed suit in the Federal District Court, Eastern District of Oklahoma. The court granted the government's motion for summary judgment and the tribe appealed. The Tenth Circuit Court of Appeals affirmed the decision of the trial court and the tribe appealed. The Supreme Court granted certiorari.

Additionally, the Choctaw Nation used the same pull-tab system and also filed suit in Federal District Court, with the same results as the Chickasaw tribe, and at the Tenth Circuit. At the Supreme Court, the appeals were combined.

== Opinion of the Court ==
Justice Stephen Breyer delivered the opinion of the Court, affirming the judgment of the lower courts. The tribes argued that they were exempt from such taxes due to a provision of the IGRA that indicated that the tax laws applied to tribes in the same manner as to the states, which did not have to pay such taxes. The Court held that this was not the case, despite information in the record of the acts authors that stated that the "tax treatment of wagers conducted by tribal governments be the same as that for wagers conducted by state governments..." The court held that the tribes were liable for the taxes.

=== Dissent ===
Justice Sandra Day O'Connor dissented, joined by Justice David Souter. O'Connor pointed out that the standard statutory construction involving Indian tribes require that "statutes are to be construed liberally in favor of the Indians, with ambiguous provisions interpreted to their benefit." She argued that the Court did not do so in this case.
