= Hope v. Pelzer =

- Supreme Court of the United States

Argued April 17, 2002 Decided June 27, 2002
- Full case name: Larry Hope, Petitioner v. Mark Pelzer, et al.
- Docket no.: 01-309
- Citations: 536 U.S. 730 (more) 122 S. Ct. 2508; 153 L. Ed. 2d 666; 2002 U.S. LEXIS 4884; 70 U.S.L.W. 4710; 2002 Cal. Daily Op. Service 5768; 2002 Daily Journal DAR 7285; 15 Fla. L. Weekly Fed. S 511

Case history
- Prior: Grant of qualified immunity affirmed by the Eleventh Circuit, 240 F.3d 975 (11th Cir. 2001); cert. granted, 534 U.S. 1073 (2001).

Holding
- Qualified immunity is not available to prison officials for civil rights lawsuits alleging violations of the Eighth Amendment ban on cruel and unusual punishment for use of a hitching post.

Court membership
- Chief Justice William Rehnquist Associate Justices John P. Stevens · Sandra Day O'Connor; Antonin Scalia · Anthony Kennedy; David Souter · Clarence Thomas; Ruth Bader Ginsburg · Stephen Breyer

Case opinions
- Majority: Stevens, joined by O'Connor, Kennedy, Souter, Ginsburg, Breyer
- Dissent: Thomas, joined by Rehnquist, Scalia

Laws applied
- U.S. Const. amend. VIII; 42 U.S.C. § 1983

Hope v. Pelzer, 536 U.S. 730 (2002), was a United States Supreme Court case in which the Court ruled that the defense of qualified immunity, under which government actors may not be sued for actions they take in connection with their offices, did not apply to a lawsuit challenging the Alabama Department of Corrections's use of the "hitching post", a punishment whereby inmates were immobilized for long periods of time.

At issue in Hope v. Pelzer was the question of whether qualified immunity applied in the case of punishment exceeding the standards of cruel and unusual punishment. The first question was whether the use of the hitching post was cruel and unusual in the twentieth century. The second question, depending on a yes answer to the first, was whether the guards were acting as agents of the state, and therefore not personally liable. Most importantly, the Supreme Court clarified to meet the “clearly established” standard is not limited solely on whether an earlier precedent with the same conduct exists but if a reasonable person would have recognized beforehand that the conduct would be unlawful or unconstitutional can itself be considered clearly established, even without a case law. The Court denied the correctional officers qualified immunity because tying inmates to a hitch post as a form of punishment clearly violated the Eighth Amendment’s prohibition on cruel and unusual punishment.

The Court opined that a hitching post was generally cruel and unusual, applying 20th century standards that probably would not have applied in 1789. The second question, and the one that the Court ruled upon, was whether the guards could claim qualified immunity. The Court let Hope sue the guards in District Court. In 2005, that court found that there was insufficient evidence to prove that in this particular case the named guards had meted cruel and unusual punishment.

== Background ==
In 1995, Alabama's prisons employed chain gangs and the hitching post. A hitching post is a "horizontal bar made of sturdy, nonflexible material placed between 45 and 57 inches from the ground. Inmates are handcuffed to the hitching post in a standing position and remain standing the entire time they are placed on the post. Most inmates are shackled to the hitching post with their two hands relatively close together and at face level." "The most repeated complaint about the hitching post was the strain it produced on inmates' muscles by forcing them to remain in a standing position with their arms raised in a stationary position [sic] for a long period of time. In addition to their exposure to sunburn, dehydration, and muscle aches, the inmates are also placed in substantial pain when the sun heats the handcuffs that shackle them to the hitching post, or heats the hitching post itself." In a related case, several other inmates "described the way in which the handcuffs burned and chafed their skin during their placement on the post."

Larry Hope, an inmate at Limestone Prison, was punished by the hitching post on two occasions. On May 11, 1995, Hope was working on a chain gang near an interstate highway when he got into an argument with another inmate. Both men were chained to the hitching post. Because Hope was only slightly taller than the hitching post, his arms were above shoulder height and grew tired from being handcuffed so high. Whenever he tried to move his arms to improve his circulation, the handcuffs cut into his wrists. Guards came by every 15 minutes to offer him water and a bathroom break, and Hope's responses were recorded in a log. Hope was let go two hours later when it was determined that the other man initiated the argument.

On June 7, 1995, however, Hope's punishment was more severe. Hope had fallen asleep during the bus ride out to the work site and was "less than prompt" in getting off the bus once it arrived there. Hope got into a fight with a guard, during which four other guards intervened and subdued Hope. The guards took Hope back to Limestone and put him on the hitching post for seven hours. The guards forced Hope to remove his shirt, and the sun burned his skin. He received water only once or twice during the day and had no bathroom breaks. At one point, one of the guards taunted him by first allowing some dogs to drink some water before bringing the water closer to him and then spilling it on the ground.

Hope sued three guards under 42 U.S.C. § 1983—the three guards involved in the May incident, one of whom was also involved in the June incident. Without deciding whether "the very act of placing him on a restraining bar for a period of hours as a form of punishment" violated the Eighth Amendment, the district court determined that the guards were entitled to qualified immunity, and entered judgment in their favor. The Eleventh Circuit determined that the use of the hitching post was cruel and unusual punishment in violation of the Eighth Amendment. Nevertheless, it affirmed the grant of qualified immunity because, in its view, the hitching post was not materially similar to other forms of punishment with respect to which it was "clearly established" that they were cruel and unusual.

== Majority opinion ==
In determining whether a defendant in a civil rights lawsuit should receive qualified immunity, the first question to ask is whether the plaintiff has alleged a constitutional violation. On the facts presented in this case, the Court concluded that Alabama's use of the hitching post violated the Eighth Amendment prohibition on cruel and unusual punishment. The "unnecessary and wanton infliction of pain constitutes cruel and unusual punishment", and "among unnecessary and wanton inflictions of pain are those that are totally without penological justification". The actions of prison officials lack penological justification if they act with deliberate indifference to the health or safety of an inmate. Here it was "obvious" that the Alabama prison guards were deliberately indifferent to Hope's health or safety. Once Hope had been transported back to the prison, concerns about safety had been addressed. There was no emergency situation at hand, yet the prison guards "knowingly subjected [Hope] to a substantial risk of physical harm, to unnecessary risk of physical pain caused by the handcuffs and the restricted position of confinement for a 7-hour period, to unnecessary exposure to the heat of the sun, to prolonged thirst and taunting, and to a deprivation of bathroom breaks that caused a risk of particular discomfort and humiliation." This was a basic violation of the "dignity of man", which amounts to "gratuitous infliction of wanton and unnecessary pain" prohibited by the law.

Even if the plaintiff has made out a constitutional violation, the defendant may still be entitled to qualified immunity if his actions "did not violate clearly established ... rights of which a reasonable person would have known". The Eleventh Circuit interpreted this standard rigidly, requiring the clearly established right to be "materially similar" to the facts presented by the plaintiff in this case. The Court rejected this approach.

Defendants in civil rights lawsuits, just like defendants in criminal cases, are entitled to fair warning that their conduct violates the law. The Court had previously held that cases establishing a constitutional right need not be "fundamentally similar" to the case at hand before rejecting qualified immunity; hence, the Eleventh Circuit's "materially similar" requirement was not the correct one to apply. Rather, the standard was "whether the state of the law in 1995 gave respondents fair warning that the alleged treatment of Hope was unconstitutional".

The Alabama prison guards' use of the hitching post was "arguably" such an "obvious" violation of Hope's Eighth Amendment rights that the Court's prior cases put the guards on notice that using the hitching post would violate the Eighth Amendment. Indeed, the U.S. Department of Justice had so advised the Alabama Department of Corrections. Furthermore, Fifth Circuit precedent that was binding on the state of Alabama—forbidding "handcuffing inmates to the fence and to cells for long periods of time, and forcing inmates to stand, sit, or lie on crates, stumps, or otherwise maintain awkward positions for prolonged periods"—should have notified the guards that using the hitching post violated the Eighth Amendment. Finally, an Alabama Department of Corrections regulation required guards to maintain a log of the inmate's needs for water and bathroom breaks while tied to the hitching post, and required the guards to release the inmate if he told them he was ready to return to work. However, evidence in this case showed that the guards did not maintain such a log during the June incident, and evidence in a related case showed that Alabama prison guards routinely disregarded the regulation's recordkeeping requirement and release conditions. "A course of conduct that tends to prove that the requirement was merely a sham, or that respondents could ignore it with impunity, provides equally strong support for the conclusion that they were fully aware of the wrongful character of their conduct."

== Dissenting opinion ==
Justice Thomas identified two principal defects in Hope's case that led him to conclude that the prison guards Hope sued were entitled to qualified immunity. First, the three guards Hope sued were not directly involved in the June incident, the one the Court found to be most disagreeable. Two of them were not even present at the time, and the third's sole contribution to the injury Hope alleged was the act of attaching Hope to the "restraining bar". As against the defendants Hope himself named in this suit, then, he did not allege that they were the cause of his injuries, and thus Hope's complaint was, in Thomas's view, deficient.

In light of these deficiencies, Thomas concluded that it was "far from obvious" that the actions of these three guards violated the Eighth Amendment. The question Thomas asked was whether in 1995 it was obvious that the "mere act of cuffing petitioner to the restraining bar... violated the Eighth Amendment." In Thomas's view, no prior litigation involving Alabama's use of the restraining bar would have put a reasonable prison guard on notice that the mere act of attaching a prisoner to it would violate the Eighth Amendment. The three federal district courts in Alabama had all rejected this contention, as well as the idea endorsed by the majority—that exposure to the elements resulting from an extended stay on the hitching post, coupled with the pain caused by the handcuffed—was the wanton and unnecessary infliction of pain. Hope did not allege that the mere act of attaching him to the restraining bar "imposed a substantial risk of serious harm upon him". Nor was it, in light of the district courts' conclusion, "obvious" that this act would have caused Hope harm. There was no evidence that these particular guards had read the Department of Justice's report. The Alabama Department of Corrections's regulation specifically authorized guards to use the restraining bar when inmates were disruptive to the work squad. The fact that the guards did not comply with the recordkeeping requirement of the regulation was beside the point, Justice Thomas believed, because Hope never alleged that the guards' failure to do so caused the Eighth Amendment violation. Thomas also read binding Fifth and Eleventh Circuit precedent merely to prohibit "malicious and sadistic" conduct by guards. While handcuffing prisoners to fences for "long periods of time" could be considered malicious and sadistic under these binding precedents, it was not clear to Justice Thomas whether 7 hours counted as a "long period of time" under this precedent. Finally, "deliberate indifference" means that the prison official knew of and then disregarded an excessive risk to health and safety, and there was no evidence that these guards knew that merely attaching Hope to the restraining bar posed such a risk.

== Subsequent lawsuit ==
In November 2005, a Judge ruled that Larry Hope failed to prove that his treatment in prison amounted to cruel and unusual punishment, and the case was dismissed.
