= Tahoe-Sierra Preservation Council, Inc. v. Tahoe Regional Planning Agency =

- Supreme Court of the United States

Argued January 7, 2002 Decided April 23, 2002
- Full case name: Tahoe-Sierra Preservation Council, Incorporated, et al. v. Tahoe-Regional Planning Agency, et al.
- Citations: 535 U.S. 302 (more) 122 S. Ct. 1465; 152 L. Ed. 2d 517; 2002 U.S. LEXIS 3028; 70 U.S.L.W. 4260; 54 ERC (BNA) 1129; 10 A.L.R. Fed. 2d 681; 2002 Cal. Daily Op. Service 3495; 32 ELR 20627; 15 Fla. L. Weekly Fed. S 203

Case history
- Prior: Judgment for plaintiff, 34 F. Supp. 2d 1226 (D. Nev. 1999), reversed, 216 F.3d 764 (9th Cir. 2000); cert. granted, 533 U.S. 948 (2001).

Holding
- The moratorium did not constitute a taking. There was an inherent difference between the acquisition of property for public use and the regulation of property from private use. The moratorium at issue in this case should be classified as a regulation of property from private use and therefore no compensation is required.

Court membership
- Chief Justice William Rehnquist Associate Justices John P. Stevens · Sandra Day O'Connor; Antonin Scalia · Anthony Kennedy; David Souter · Clarence Thomas; Ruth Bader Ginsburg · Stephen Breyer

Case opinions
- Majority: Stevens, joined by O'Connor, Kennedy, Souter, Ginsburg, Breyer
- Dissent: Rehnquist, joined by Scalia, Thomas
- Dissent: Thomas, joined by Scalia

Laws applied
- U.S. Const. amends. V, XIV

Tahoe-Sierra Preservation Council, Inc. v. Tahoe Regional Planning Agency, 535 U.S. 302 (2002), is one of the United States Supreme Court's more recent interpretations of the Takings Clause of the Fifth and Fourteenth Amendments. The case dealt with the question of whether a moratorium on construction of individual homes imposed by the Tahoe Regional Planning Agency fell under the Takings Clause of the United States Constitution and whether the landowners therefore should receive just compensation as required by that clause. The Tahoe Regional Planning Agency was represented by future Chief Justice John Roberts. Justice John Paul Stevens wrote the opinion of the Court, finding that the moratorium did not constitute a taking. It reasoned that there was an inherent difference between the acquisition of property for public use and the regulation of property from private use. The majority concluded that the moratorium at issue in this case should be classified as a regulation of property from private use and therefore no compensation was required.

== Facts of the case ==
Lake Tahoe Basin falls within both California and Nevada. Those two states created the Tahoe Regional Planning Agency (TRPA) to plan the development of the basin. Between 1981 and 1984, the TRPA issued two moratoriums on virtually all residential development within the basin. The first moratorium lasted roughly 24 months and the second lasted about 8 months until the TRPA had adopted its comprehensive land-use plan. The plaintiffs in the case were a group of persons who owned individual home sites within the jurisdiction of the TRPA and were therefore subject to the moratoria. The plaintiffs were challenging the law on the grounds that by denying the use of their land, the moratoria issued by the TRPA were in fact takings as described by the Takings Clause of the US Constitution in the Fifth and Fourteenth Amendments and that therefore they should receive just compensation.

== Procedural history ==
The District Court found that:

(1) Even though the land retained some value during the period of the moratoria the landowners were, for a time, completely deprived of any economic use of their land.

(2) Therefore the two moratoria did in fact constitute a taking as described by the Takings Clause of the U.S. Constitution.

The case was appealed to the United States Court of Appeals for the Ninth Circuit. The Circuit Court found that since the moratoria had only temporary impact on the landowners property no taking occurred and no compensation was required.

== Issue before the Court ==
Whether a moratorium on development imposed during the process of devising a comprehensive land-use plan constitutes a per se taking of property requiring compensation.

== Decision of the Court ==
=== Majority opinion ===
The majority opinion written by Justice Stevens dealt with several issues that were raised by the petitioners seeking compensation.

First, Justice Stevens discarded the petitioners’ assertion that the enactment of the moratorium deprived the plaintiffs of all economic use of the property and therefore required compensation.

Justice Stevens held the case law does not support and in fact rejects the idea that a temporary moratorium invokes the Just Compensation clause. The text of the Fifth Amendment itself, he argued, creates a distinction between physical takings and regulatory takings specifying that only physical takings of private property for public purposes require just compensation. Justice Stevens closed this section of his argument predicting that if all takings, physical and regulatory, were to require just compensation then the whole notion of government takings would be, “a luxury few governments could afford.”

Next Justice Stevens dealt with petitioners urging to examine the Court’s case law dealing with regulatory takings especially Lucas v. South Carolina Coastal Council (1992). Stevens, however, dismissed the precedent of Lucas saying that logically the property at issue in the present case cannot be considered to have lost all economic value since as soon as the moratorium is lifted it will recover all economic value. Fluctuations in property value cannot be considered constitutional takings.

Lastly, Justice Stevens moved on to more functional concerns. If governments are required to compensate landowners every time a moratorium is put into place in order to plan the development of an area, then officials will either rush through the planning process or skip it altogether; this would foster growth in the community that is either ill-conceived or inefficient.

== See also ==
- List of United States Supreme Court cases, volume 535
- List of United States Supreme Court cases
- Penn Central Transportation Co. v. New York City (1978)
- Suitum v. Tahoe Regional Planning Agency, 520 U.S. 725 (1997) holding a federal court should not consider a claim against an agency before the government has reached a “final” decision. See also, Pakdel v. City and County of San Francisco, 594 U.S. ___ (2021).
