= United States v. Ruiz =

- Supreme Court of the United States
- Full case name: United States v. Ruiz
- Citations: 536 U.S. 622 (more)

Case opinions
- Majority: Breyer, joined by Rehnquist, Stevens, O'Connor, Scalia, Kennedy, Souter, Ginsburg
- Concurrence: Thomas

Laws applied
- U.S. Const. amend. XIV

United States v. Ruiz, 536 U.S. 622 (2002), was a decision by the United States Supreme Court in which the Court held that Brady v. Maryland did not require prosecutors to disclose impeachment evidence during plea bargaining.

== Opinion ==
In Ruiz, the defendant sought to vacate her sentence because a plea deal she had been offered, which she rejected, included a waiver of their right to impeachment information related to informants or witnesses. The United States Court of Appeals for the Ninth Circuit granted the vacatur, finding that a plea is not voluntary unless the prosecution disclosed impeachment information to the defendant. This constituted a violation of the rule in United States v. Brady that pleas have to be voluntarily, knowingly, and intelligently made.

The Supreme Court reversed the Ninth Circuit and gave three primary reasons for doing so. First, the Court stated that "impeachment information is special in relation to the fairness of a trial, not in respect to whether a plea is voluntary." Second, the Court cited court precedent finding that voluntariness in the plea context did not require "complete knowledge of the relevant circumstances" on the part of the defendant. Finally, the Court stated that such an obligation "could seriously interfere with the Government's interest in securing those guilty pleas that are factually justified, desired by defendants, and help to secure the efficient administration of justice."

== Subsequent developments ==
Because Ruiz referred to Brady disclosures as a "trial-related" right, it raised questions as to whether Brady required the disclosure of exculpatory evidence during plea bargaining. By 2010, at least three circuit court of appeals relied upon Ruiz to hold that Brady did not. While the majority of courts have not expanded Ruiz further than its holding related to impeachment evidence, the debate about exculpatory evidence has continued in scholarship.
