= Gonzaga University v. Doe =

- Supreme Court of the United States

Argued April 24, 2002 Decided June 20, 2002
- Full case name: Gonzaga University and Roberta S. League, Petitioners v. John Doe
- Docket no.: 01-679
- Citations: 536 U.S. 273 (more) 122 S. Ct. 2268; 153 L. Ed. 2d 309; 2002 U.S. LEXIS 4649; 70 U.S.L.W. 4577; 2002 Cal. Daily Op. Service 5458; 2002 Daily Journal DAR 6859; 15 Fla. L. Weekly Fed. S 436

Case history
- Prior: On writ of certiorari to the Supreme Court of Washington. Doe v. Gonzaga Univ., 143 Wn.2d 687, 24 P.3d 390, 2001 Wash. LEXIS 381 (2001)

Holding
- The Family Educational Rights and Privacy Act's nondisclosure provisions created no personal rights to enforce under 42 U.S.C. § 1983.

Court membership
- Chief Justice William Rehnquist Associate Justices John P. Stevens · Sandra Day O'Connor; Antonin Scalia · Anthony Kennedy; David Souter · Clarence Thomas; Ruth Bader Ginsburg · Stephen Breyer

Case opinions
- Majority: Rehnquist, joined by O'Connor, Scalia, Kennedy, Thomas
- Concurrence: Breyer (in judgment), joined by Souter
- Dissent: Stevens, joined by Ginsburg

Laws applied
- Family Educational Rights and Privacy Act, 42 U.S.C. § 1983

Gonzaga University v. Doe, 536 U.S. 273 (2002), was a case in which the Supreme Court of the United States ruled that the Family Educational Rights and Privacy Act of 1974, which prohibits the federal government from funding educational institutions that release education records to unauthorized persons, does not create a right which is enforceable under 42 U.S.C. § 1983.

== Background ==
A Gonzaga University undergraduate sued the school and teacher Roberta League under 42 U.S.C. § 1983, alleging a violation of the Family Educational Rights and Privacy Act of 1974. The student was planning to become an elementary teacher upon graduation, and under Washington State Law, all new teachers required an affidavit of good moral character from their graduating college. The teacher in charge of certifying such affidavits, League, overheard a student conversation discussing sexual misconduct by the undergraduate student. Subsequently, League launched an investigation into the matter, and refused to certify the student's necessary affidavit of good moral character. The student sued, claiming a violation of his confidentiality rights.

== Decision ==
In a 7–2 decision for Gonzaga University, Chief Justice Rehnquist wrote the majority opinion for the court. The Supreme Court held that Family Educational Rights and Privacy Act's nondisclosure provisions created no personal rights to enforce under 42 U.S.C. § 1983. The Family Educational Rights and Privacy Act prohibits "the federal funding of educational institutions that have a policy or practice of releasing education records to unauthorized persons". 536 U.S. at 276. The court reasoned that this does not grant any personal rights to enforce under the civil rights provisions of § 1983, since the statute only addresses federal funding.

== See also ==
- List of United States Supreme Court cases, volume 536
- List of United States Supreme Court cases
