= Board of Education v. Earls =

- Supreme Court of the United States

Argued March 19, 2002 Decided June 27, 2002
- Full case name: Board of Education of Independent School District of Pottawatomie County, et al. v. Earls, et al.
- Citations: 536 U.S. 822 (more) 122 S. Ct. 2559; 153 L. Ed. 2d 735

Holding
- Coercive drug testing imposed by school district upon students who participate in extracurricular activities does not violate the Fourth Amendment.

Court membership
- Chief Justice William Rehnquist Associate Justices John P. Stevens · Sandra Day O'Connor; Antonin Scalia · Anthony Kennedy; David Souter · Clarence Thomas; Ruth Bader Ginsburg · Stephen Breyer

Case opinions
- Majority: Thomas, joined by Rehnquist, Scalia, Kennedy, Breyer
- Concurrence: Breyer
- Dissent: O'Connor, joined by Souter
- Dissent: Ginsburg, joined by Stevens, O'Connor, Souter

Laws applied
- U.S. Const. amend. IV

Board of Education v. Earls, 536 U.S. 822 (2002), was a case by the Supreme Court of the United States in which the Court held, 5–4, that it does not violate the Fourth Amendment to the U.S. Constitution for public schools to conduct mandatory drug testing on students participating in extracurricular activities.

The case centered around a policy adopted by the school district of Tecumseh, Oklahoma requiring all students involved in extracurricular activities, including the school's sports teams, to consent to urinalysis testing for drugs. Two students, Lindsay Earls and Daniel James, brought a lawsuit against the school board, alleging that the policy violated the Fourth Amendment's prohibition of unreasonable search and seizure.

== Background ==
The school district of Tecumseh, Oklahoma requires all middle and high school students to consent to urinalysis testing for drugs in order to participate in any extracurricular activity. Two students at Tecumseh High School and their parents brought suit, alleging that the policy violates the Fourth Amendment. The District Court granted the School District summary judgment. In reversing, the Court of Appeals held that the policy violated the Fourth Amendment. The appellate court concluded that before imposing a suspicionless drug-testing program, a school should demonstrate some identifiable drug abuse problem among a sufficient number of those tested, such that testing that group will actually redress its drug problem, which the School District failed to demonstrate.

== Opinion of the Court ==
In a majority opinion delivered by Justice Clarence Thomas, the Court held that students in extracurricular activities had a diminished expectation of privacy, and that the policy furthered an important interest of the school in preventing drug use among students. This rationale was based on the precedent Vernonia School District 47J v. Acton (1995), which allowed drug testing for athletes. Justice Stephen Breyer filed an opinion concurring in the Court's judgment.
