= Rush Prudential HMO, Inc. v. Moran =

- Supreme Court of the United States

Argued January 16, 2002 Decided June 20, 2002
- Full case name: Rush Prudential HMO, Incorporated, Petitioner v. Debra C. Moran, et al.
- Citations: 536 U.S. 355 (more) 122 S. Ct. 2151; 153 L. Ed. 2d 375; 2002 U.S. LEXIS 4644; 70 U.S.L.W. 4600; 27 Employee Benefits Cas. (BNA) 2921; 15 Fla. L. Weekly Fed. S 409

Case history
- Prior: Moran v. Rush Prudential HMO, Inc., No. 98-cv-442, 1999 WL 417384 (N.D. Ill. June 15, 1999); reversed, 230 F.3d 959 (7th Cir. 2000); cert. granted, 533 U.S. 948 (2001).

Holding
- ERISA did not preempt an Illinois medical-review statute.

Court membership
- Chief Justice William Rehnquist Associate Justices John P. Stevens · Sandra Day O'Connor; Antonin Scalia · Anthony Kennedy; David Souter · Clarence Thomas; Ruth Bader Ginsburg · Stephen Breyer

Case opinions
- Majority: Souter, joined by Stevens, O'Connor, Ginsburg, Breyer
- Dissent: Thomas, joined by Rehnquist, Scalia, Kennedy

Laws applied
- Illinois's Health Maintenance Organization Act; Employee Retirement Income Security Act

Rush Prudential HMO, Inc. v. Moran, 536 U.S. 355 (2002), was a decision by the Supreme Court of the United States in which the court held that the federal Employee Retirement Income Security Act (ERISA) did not preempt an Illinois medical-review statute.

ERISA envisions a national standard for welfare and pension plans so state laws which "relate to" ERISA plans are preempted under Section 514 of ERISA. However, ERISA contains a "savings" clause which saves state laws which regulate insurance under Section 514(b). The statute at issue in Moran regulated insurance, which is one of the functions HMOs perform. Although HMOs provide healthcare as well as insurance, the statute does not require choosing a single or primary function of an HMO. Congress has long recognized that HMOs are risk-bearing organizations subject to state regulation. Finally, allowing States to regulate the insurance aspects of HMOs will not interfere with the desire of Congress for uniform national standards under ERISA.

This case was partially overruled in Kentucky Ass'n of Health Plans, Inc. v. Miller, 538 U.S. 329 (2003).
