= Barnes v. Gorman =

- Supreme Court of the United States

Argued April 23, 2002 Decided June 17, 2002
- Full case name: Barnes, in her official capacity as Member of the Board of Police Commissioners of Kansas City Missouri, et al. v. Gorman
- Docket no.: 01-682
- Citations: 536 U.S. 181 (more)

Case history
- Prior: Gorman v. Easley, 1999 U.S. Dist. WL 34808615 (W.D. Mo. 1999). Gorman v. Easley, 257 F.3d 738 (8th Cir. 2001).

Court membership
- Chief Justice William Rehnquist Associate Justices John P. Stevens · Sandra Day O'Connor; Antonin Scalia · Anthony Kennedy; David Souter · Clarence Thomas; Ruth Bader Ginsburg · Stephen Breyer

Case opinions
- Majority: Scalia, joined by Rehnquist, O’Connor, Kennedy, Souter, Thomas
- Concurrence: Souter, joined by O’Connor
- Concurrence: Stevens (in judgment), joined by Ginsburg, Breyer

Laws applied
- Americans with Disabilities Act of 1990; Rehabilitation Act of 1973; Title VI of the Civil Rights Act of 1964

Barnes v. Gorman, 536 U.S. 181 (2002), was a case decided by the Supreme Court of the United States on June 17, 2002. The court decided that punitive damages may not be awarded in private lawsuits brought under § 202 of the Americans with Disabilities Act of 1990 (ADA) and § 504 of the Rehabilitation Act.

== Background ==
In May 1992, Jeffrey Gorman, a paraplegic who used a wheelchair, was arrested for trespassing after fighting with a bouncer at a nightclub in Kansas City, Missouri. The police van was not equipped to store Barnes's wheelchair. Gorman suffered serious injuries when he was transported to the police station in a vehicle that was not equipped to accommodate people with disabilities. Gorman sued several police officials and officers for disability discrimination, in violation of § 202 of the ADA and § 504 of the Rehabilitation Act. At trial, a jury awarded Gorman compensatory and punitive damages. The District Court, however, vacated the jury award as to punitive damages, holding that such damages are not available in private lawsuits brought under the two statutes. The United States Court of Appeals for the Eighth Circuit reversed.

== Decision ==
In a unanimous decision delivered by Justice Scalia, the Supreme Court held that punitive damages are not available under § 202 of the ADA and § 504 of the Rehabilitation Act, because remedies for private actions under these sections are coextensive with the remedies available under Title VI of the Civil Rights Act of 1964, under which punitive damages are not available in private suits.

== See also ==
- Americans with Disabilities Act of 1990
- Rehabilitation Act of 1973
- Civil Rights Act of 1964
- List of United States Supreme Court cases, volume 536
