= Watchtower Bible & Tract Society of New York, Inc. v. Village of Stratton =

Watchtower Society v. Village of Stratton
- Supreme Court of the United States

Argued February 26, 2002 Decided June 17, 2002
- Full case name: Watchtower Bible and Tract Society of New York, Inc., et al., v. Village of Stratton, et al.
- Citations: 536 U.S. 150 (more) 122 S.Ct. 2080; 153 L. Ed. 2d 205; 2002 U.S. LEXIS 4422

Case history
- Prior: Motion for preliminary injunction granted in part and denied in part, 61 F. Supp. 2d 734 (S.D. Ohio 1999), affirmed, 240 F.3d 553 (6th Cir. 2001); cert. granted, 534 U.S. 971 (2001).
- Subsequent: On remand, 42 F. App'x 772 (6th Cir. 2002).

Holding
- A town ordinance's provisions making it a misdemeanor to engage in door-to-door advocacy without first registering with town officials and receiving a permit violates the First Amendment as it applies to religious proselytizing, anonymous political speech, and the distribution of handbills.

Court membership
- Chief Justice William Rehnquist Associate Justices John P. Stevens · Sandra Day O'Connor; Antonin Scalia · Anthony Kennedy; David Souter · Clarence Thomas; Ruth Bader Ginsburg · Stephen Breyer

Case opinions
- Majority: Stevens, joined by O'Connor, Kennedy, Souter, Ginsburg, Breyer
- Concurrence: Breyer, joined by Souter, Ginsburg
- Concurrence: Scalia (in judgment), joined by Thomas
- Dissent: Rehnquist

Laws applied
- U.S. Const. amend. I

Watchtower Bible & Tract Society of New York, Inc. v. Village of Stratton, 536 U.S. 150 (2002), is a United States Supreme Court case in which the Court held that a town ordinance's provisions making it a misdemeanor to engage in door-to-door advocacy without first registering with town officials and receiving a permit violates the First Amendment as it applies to religious proselytizing, anonymous political speech, and the distribution of handbills.

== Background ==
The Village of Stratton, Ohio, established an ordinance that, among other things, prohibited "canvassers" from "going in and upon" private residential property to promote any "cause" without first obtaining a permit from the mayor's office by completing and signing a registration form. The ordinance imposed criminal sanctions on canvassing or soliciting without a license. Jehovah's Witnesses, a religious group that publishes and distributes religious materials, sought injunctive relief, alleging that the ordinance violates its First Amendment rights to the free exercise of religion, freedom of speech, and freedom of the press.

The registration procedure, revised once to address objections from Jehovah's Witnesses, required the applicant to provide detailed information that is then posted in a public record: the applicant's name, home address, the organization or cause to be promoted, the name and address of the employer or affiliated organization (with credentials from the employer or organization showing the individual's exact relationship), the length of time that "the privilege to canvass or solicit is desired," the addresses to be contacted, and "such other information concerning the Registrant and its business or purpose as may be reasonably necessary to accurately describe the nature of the privilege required."

Stratton's anti-solicitation ordinance required registration of those who seek the "privilege" of going door-to-door, and also required the would-be solicitor to carry a permit which must be shown to anybody (i.e. police officer, or Village resident) who requests it.

Under the ordinance, residents of Stratton had the right to opt out of all or some solicitations through two means. First, they could post a "no solicitation" or "no trespassing" sign on their property. Residents could also fill out a "no solicitation" registration form at the office of the mayor. As part of the registration form, residents could indicate permission for solicitations from any or all of a series of listed groups: Scouting organizations, trick-or-treaters, food vendors, Christmas carolers, political candidates, campaigners, Jehovah's Witnesses, "Persons affiliated with __ Church," and other groups.

Jehovah's Witnesses pointed to the fact that they were the only religious organization singled out on this form, as well as to discriminatory statements made by Stratton's mayor, as indications of an anti-Jehovah's Witnesses bias underlying the law. The village of Stratton, on the other hand, claimed that the ordinance was motivated by a desire to protect Stratton's elderly citizens from potential frauds and scams.

The District Court upheld most provisions of the ordinance as valid, content-neutral regulations, although it did require the Village to accept narrowing constructions of several provisions. The Sixth Circuit affirmed. Among its rulings, that court held that the ordinance was content neutral and of general applicability and therefore subject to intermediate scrutiny; rejected petitioners' argument that the ordinance is overbroad because it impairs the right to distribute pamphlets anonymously that was recognized in McIntyre v. Ohio Elections Comm'n, 514 U. S. 334; concluded that the Village's interests in protecting its residents from fraud and undue annoyance and its desire to prevent criminals from posing as canvassers in order to defraud its residents were sufficient bases on which to justify the regulation; and distinguished this Court's earlier cases protecting the ministry of Jehovah's Witnesses.

=== Amicus briefs ===
Amicus briefs filed with the Supreme Court in support of Jehovah's Witnesses in the Village of Stratton case:

- Independent Baptist Church of America
- Electronic Privacy Information Center (EPIC)
- Center for Individual Freedom
- The Church of Jesus Christ of Latter-day Saints
- RealCampaignReform.Org, Inc., et al.

== Opinion of the Court ==
On June 17, 2002, the Court ruled in an 8–1 decision that the requirement of the Village of Stratton's ordinance for solicitors to "register" before engaging in door-to-door advocacy violated the First Amendment. The Court stated "it is offensive, not only to the values protected by the First Amendment, but to the very notion of a free society, that in the context of everyday public discourse a citizen must first inform the government of her desire to speak to her neighbors and then obtain a permit to do so." The Supreme Court did not address the remaining provisions of the ordinance, which remain valid and legally enforceable.

== Subsequent developments ==
While municipalities across the United States generally abandoned ordinances similar to that which had been overturned, others apparently directed or tolerated subsequent police interference with house-to-house religious canvassing. Such incidents are now handled collectively by the branch office of Jehovah's Witnesses of the land in which they occur, rather than on a case-by-case basis by local Witnesses themselves.

Citing repeatedly from the now-settled law of Stratton, the Watchtower Society in 2009 filed with the United States Court of Appeals for relief from Puerto Rico's new law restricting canvassing on public streets in public, gated neighborhoods. The law was widely interpreted as intended to restrict Jehovah's Witnesses' house-to-house evangelism.
