= McKune v. Lile =

- Supreme Court of the United States

Argued November 28, 2001 Decided June 10, 2002
- Full case name: McKune, Warden, et al. v. Robert G. Lile
- Citations: 536 U.S. 24 (more) 122 S. Ct. 2017; 153 L. Ed. 2d 47; 2002 U.S. LEXIS 4206

Case history
- Prior: Lile v. McKune, 24 F. Supp. 2d 1152 (D. Kan. 1998); 224 F.3d 1175 (10th Cir. 2000), reversed and remanded

Holding
- The state's consequences for non-participants of the SATP program do not constitute a violation of the respondent's Fifth Amendment rights.

Court membership
- Chief Justice William Rehnquist Associate Justices John P. Stevens · Sandra Day O'Connor; Antonin Scalia · Anthony Kennedy; David Souter · Clarence Thomas; Ruth Bader Ginsburg · Stephen Breyer

Case opinions
- Plurality: Kennedy, joined by Rehnquist, Scalia, Thomas
- Concurrence: O'Connor
- Dissent: Stevens, joined by Souter, Ginsburg, Breyer

McKune v. Lile, 536 U.S. 24 (2002), is a United States Supreme Court case in which the Court determined that Kansas' Sexual Abuse Treatment Program (SATP) served a vital penological purpose and determined that allowing minimal incentives to take part in the SATP does not equal compelled self-incrimination as prohibited by the Fifth Amendment. There were three main points to the case that were used to determine the SATPs were constitutional as summarized by the National District Attorneys Association (NDAA). These included the distinct findings that, “[t]he SATP in Kansas is supported by the legitimate penological objective of rehabilitation”, that, “the fact that Kansas does not offer immunity or privilege in response to statements made by participants does not render the SATP invalid under the [fifth] amendment”, and that the, “consequences that follow for nonparticipation, do not, under the Kansas plan, combine to create compulsion, thereby infringing upon the participant’s [fifth] amendment right”. Due to the plurality of the case, no singular decision was held as a majority.

== Background ==
Previously, the respondent, Robert G. Lile, was charged with the rape of a female high school student. He convinced her to enter his car and, at gunpoint, made her perform oral sodomy on him and at a different location he continued on to rape her. He was then convicted on all charges of rape, aggravated sodomy and aggravated kidnapping in State v. Lile. Before he was to be released, officials ordered him to take part in the SATP program to further ensure that upon release he would not rape again. By taking part in the program, participants must fulfill an “Admission of Responsibility” form that encompasses the participant's entire sexual history whether or not charges have been brought upon the past acts that are admitted. If the participant refuses, he is then transferred to another prison where he has access to decreased privileges. The results of the SATP form do promote the end goal of the program but is not held as privileged information.

=== Fifth Amendment ===
No person shall be held to answer for a capital, or otherwise infamous crime, unless on a presentment or indictment of a Grand Jury, except in cases arising in the land or naval forces, or in the Militia, when in actual service in time of War or public danger; nor shall any person be subject for the same offence to be twice put in jeopardy of life or limb, nor shall be compelled in any criminal case to be a witness against himself, nor be deprived of life, liberty, or property, without due process of law; nor shall private property be taken for public use, without just compensation.

The following three components are necessary to implicate the privilege against self-incrimination: the privilege must ordinarily be invoked, the statement must be incriminating, and the statement must be compelled. The United States Supreme Court held that the privilege against self-incrimination was not self-executing. If a witness “desires the protection of the privilege, he must claim it or he will not be considered to have been ‘compelled’ within the meaning of the Amendment. ”To qualify as incriminating there must be a “real danger” of prosecution, and not merely a “remote and speculative possibilit[y].”

=== Lile's argument ===
Respondent Lile felt that his Fifth Amendment rights were being infringed upon. By participating in the SATP he was subject to accept responsibility for his past sexual actions. This acceptance of responsibility could have been deemed criminal and could be brought against him thus making him a witness against himself. Officials had previously informed him that his privileges would be reduced from a level III to a level 1 which would amount to, ”the automatic curtailment of his visitation rights, earnings, work opportunities, ability to send money to family, canteen expenditures, access to a personal television, and other privileges”. Lile would also be moved from a medium security prison to a maximum security prison, “where his movement would be more limited, he would be moved from a two-person to a four-person cell, and he would be in a potentially more dangerous environment”. He declined to fill out the “Admission of Responsibility” form and felt the penalties incurred for nonparticipation in the program was sufficient evidence of unconstitutional compulsion.

=== State's argument ===
While the SATP program required admission of a complete sexual history and included a polygraph, the results were solely used for purpose of the program. The SATP is an 18-month program that involves heavy counseling to reduce the chances of the participant's likelihood of recidivism. It relies on the participant's admission of past sexual acts as part of the rehabilitation process. While the results are not privileged, the state has claimed that the results have never been used to charge or prosecute an inmate. The two main reasons the program does not offer immunity for admission of any criminally deemed activity are because the, “potential for additional punishment reinforces the gravity of the participants’ offenses and thereby aids in their rehabilitation”, and the, “State confirms its valid interest in deterrence by keeping open the option to prosecute a particularly dangerous sex offender”. The reasoning behind the defendant's decreased privileges was a result in the move of the defendant to a more secure prison facility. The change in facility was brought on because spaces were needed for those who chose to participate in the SATP as it was held at the medium security prison.

== Opinion of the Court ==
The decision was handed down by Justice Kennedy and, “concluded that the SATP serves a vital penological purpose, and that offering inmates minimal incentives to participate does not amount to compelled self-incrimination prohibited by the Fifth Amendment”. Chief Justice Rehnquist and Justices Scalia, and Thomas joined the majority. Justice O'Connor followed the main holding but disagreed with the rationale in her concurrence. Justice Stevens, joined by Justices Souter, Ginsburg and Breyer, followed with a dissent. The result was a Plurality Opinion.

=== Plurality opinion ===
Justice Kennedy delivered the judgment and focused on three different aspects of the state's actions to determine the constitutionality of the SATP. Firstly, the program must have a penological objective and it was found that the SATP did have an objective which included both rehabilitation and deterrence. Second, any consequences faced by those who choose not to participate must relate to the ultimate goals of the program. These consequences were brought forth by the non-privileged aspect of the program. It allows for the participant to realize that their actions have consequences. Lastly, the consequences presented must not cause compulsion and, “must, ‘not constitute atypical and significant hardships in relation to the ordinary incidents of prison life’”. It was found that, “the penalties facing [the] respondent are the same as those imposed for prison disciplinary violations [which] does not make them coercive”. It was also found that, “Lile was transferred from the prison that offered SATP simply to make room for other inmates who might participate in the SATP”, and it was not a consequence of his declination of participation. Another contributing factor for why the consequences for Lile not participating in the SATP were not found as compulsory were because the prison sentence was not extended in any way and credit for good behavior or his chances or parole were not affected.

=== Concurrence ===
Justice O’Connor agreed with the majority but wanted a more useful ruling that covered situations outside of the narrow facts presented in this case. She agreed that moving the defendant to a maximum security prison and decreasing his privileges did not constitute compulsion under the Fifth Amendment. However, she disagreed with the plurality for not setting forth a comprehensive decision about what constituted compulsion under the Fifth Amendment. Justice O’Connor felt that the “atypical and significant hardship” standard presented by the plurality should actually be broader. She stated that she does not “ agree that the standard for compulsion is the same as the due process standard [that was] identified in Sandin v. Conner, 515 U. S. 472 (1995)”.

=== Dissent ===
Justice Stevens’ dissent found that the combined effect of the consequences presented to Lile were, “in fact severe, but even if that were not so, the plurality’s policy judgment does not justify the evisceration of a constitutional right”. Justice Stevens also felt that alternatives to the SATP program could have been utilized. For example, the state could not prove that confidential treatment would harm the goals of the program. Stevens concluded that, “[n]o matter what the goal, inmates should not be compelled to forfeit the privilege against self-incrimination simply because the ends are legitimate or because they have been convicted of sex offenses".

== See also ==
- Miranda v. Arizona, 384 U.S. 436, 455 (1966)
