= United States v. Craft =

- Supreme Court of the United States

Argued January 14, 2002 Decided April 17, 2002
- Full case name: United States v. Sandra L. Craft
- Docket no.: 00-1831
- Citations: 535 U.S. 274 (more)
- Argument: Oral argument

Holding
- The Court held that each spouse in a tenancy by the entirety possesses individual rights in the estate sufficient to constitute "property" or "rights to property" for the purposes of a lien.

Court membership
- Chief Justice William Rehnquist Associate Justices John P. Stevens · Sandra Day O'Connor; Antonin Scalia · Anthony Kennedy; David Souter · Clarence Thomas; Ruth Bader Ginsburg · Stephen Breyer

Case opinions
- Majority: O'Connor, joined by Rehnquist, Kennedy, Souter, Ginsburg, Breyer
- Dissent: Scalia, joined by Thomas
- Dissent: Thomas, joined by Stevens, Scalia

Laws applied
- 26 U.S.C.§ 6321

United States v. Craft, 535 U.S. 274 (2002) is a United States Supreme Court ruling that held a spouse in a tenancy by the entirety possesses an individual right in their own estate to the level to constitute "rights to property" for the purpose of a lien.
