= Utah v. Evans =

- Supreme Court of the United States

Argued March 27, 2002 Decided June 20, 2002
- Full case name: Utah, et al. v. Evans, Secretary of Commerce, et al.
- Citations: 536 U.S. 452 (more) 122 S. Ct. 2191; 153 L. Ed. 2d 453; 2002 U.S. LEXIS 4645; 70 U.S.L.W. 4628; 2002 Cal. Daily Op. Service 5474; 2002 Daily Journal DAR 6881; 15 Fla. L. Weekly Fed. S 420

Case history
- Prior: Utah sought an injunction compelling respondents to change the official census results. North Carolina intervened. The District Court for the District of Utah found for the Census Bureau

Holding
- Utah had standing to sue for a revision of the census results. The Bureau's use of hot-deck imputation did not violate 13 U.S.C. sec. 195, nor the census clause of the Constitution.

Court membership
- Chief Justice William Rehnquist Associate Justices John P. Stevens · Sandra Day O'Connor; Antonin Scalia · Anthony Kennedy; David Souter · Clarence Thomas; Ruth Bader Ginsburg · Stephen Breyer

Case opinions
- Majority: Breyer, joined by Rehnquist, Stevens, Souter, Ginsburg; O'Connor (Parts I and II)
- Concur/dissent: O'Connor
- Concur/dissent: Thomas, joined by Kennedy
- Dissent: Scalia

Laws applied
- 13 U.S.C. § 195, U.S. Const., Art. I, section 2, clause 3

Utah v. Evans, 536 U.S. 452 (2002), was a United States Supreme Court case holding that the use of certain statistical techniques in the United States census does not violate 13 U.S.C. §195 or the Census Clause of the Constitution. The case was brought against Donald L. Evans, et al. by the state of Utah; Evans was the U.S. Secretary of Commerce at the time.

In instances where the Census Bureau remained unsure of the number of residents at an address after a field visit, the Bureau inferred its population characteristics with statistics taken from its nearest similar neighbor, a practice called "hot-deck imputation". The use of hot-deck imputation in the 2000 census increased the population of North Carolina by 0.4% and Utah by 0.2%. Due to the practice, during the reapportionment of the US House of Representatives Utah received one less seat and North Carolina gained a seat. Utah sought an injunction requiring the Bureau to revise the published census results to those without the use of imputation. North Carolina, which stood to lose a Representative under such an injunction, intervened in the case, disputing Utah's standing to sue. The Utah federal district court refused to grant the State's injunction ruling in favor of the Census Bureau.

Appealing the ruling to the Supreme Court, Utah argued that the Bureau's use of imputation violated 13 U.S.C. §195, which prohibits use of "sampling" for apportioning Representatives among states. It further argued that imputation did not satisfy the United States Constitution's requirement of an "actual enumeration" for the purpose of apportioning Representatives. In a 5–4 ruling, the Supreme Court rejected Utah's arguments and affirmed the district court's opinion. In the majority opinion, Justice Breyer reasoned that hot-deck imputation did not constitute sampling, which attempts to extrapolate statistics about a large population from the statistics of a smaller one, rather it attempts to account for missing individuals by comparing across populations. Furthermore, the Census Clause of the Constitution was not violated as the actual enumeration needs to be conducted "in such Manner as" Congress itself "shall by Law direct", which wording which does not forbid the use of statistical methods to improve accuracy.

This case follows several others that rule on "sampling" in the US census, including Department of Commerce v. United States House of Representatives, 525 U.S. 316 (1999), a suit which followed President Clinton's veto of a law passed by Congress intending to explicitly prohibit sampling, and Wisconsin v. City of New York, 517 U.S. 1 (1996), which ruled that sampling was not required by the Enumeration clause.

== See also ==
- List of United States Supreme Court cases, volume 536
- List of United States Supreme Court cases
