= Republican Party of Minnesota v. White =

- Supreme Court of the United States

Argued March 26, 2002 Decided June 27, 2002
- Full case name: Republican Party of Minnesota, et al., Petitioners v. Suzanne White, Chairperson, Minnesota Board of Judicial Standards, et al.
- Docket no.: 01-521
- Citations: 536 U.S. 765 (more) 122 S. Ct. 2528; 153 L. Ed. 2d 694; 2002 U.S. LEXIS 4883; 70 U.S.L.W. 4720; 15 Fla. L. Weekly Fed. S 518
- Argument: Oral argument
- Opinion announcement: Opinion announcement

Case history
- Prior: Judgment for defendants, 63 F. Supp. 2d 967 (Minn. 1999); affirmed, 247 F.3d 854 (8th Cir. 2001); cert. granted, 534 U.S. 1054 (2001)

Holding
- "Announce clauses" of judicial ethics codes which prohibit judicial candidates from announcing their views on how disputed legal or political issues be decided are unconstitutional.

Court membership
- Chief Justice William Rehnquist Associate Justices John P. Stevens · Sandra Day O'Connor; Antonin Scalia · Anthony Kennedy; David Souter · Clarence Thomas; Ruth Bader Ginsburg · Stephen Breyer

Case opinions
- Majority: Scalia, joined by Rehnquist, O'Connor, Kennedy, Thomas
- Concurrence: O'Connor
- Concurrence: Kennedy
- Dissent: Stevens, joined by Souter, Ginsburg, Breyer
- Dissent: Ginsburg, joined by Stevens, Souter, Breyer

Laws applied
- U.S. Const. amend. I; Minnesota Code of Judicial Conduct 5(A)(3)(d)(i)

Republican Party of Minnesota v. White, 536 U.S. 765 (2002), was a decision of the Supreme Court of the United States regarding the First Amendment rights of candidates for judicial office. In a 5–4 decision, the court ruled that Minnesota's announce clause, which forbade candidates for judicial office from announcing their views on disputed legal and political issues, was unconstitutional.

== Background ==
Minnesota, like many states, had a code of judicial ethics that constrained candidates seeking to be elected as judges from discussing issues that could come before them if elected and announcing their views—referred to as an "announce clause."

In 1996, Gregory Wersal ran for associate justice of the Minnesota Supreme Court. He distributed literature critical of several Minnesota Supreme Court decisions. An ethics complaint was filed against him; however, the board, which was to review the complaint, dismissed the charges and cast doubt upon the constitutionality of the announce clause.

In 1998, Wersal ran again for the same office. However, this time, he preemptively filed suit in Federal District Court against Suzanne White, the chairperson of the Minnesota Board on Judicial Standards. Wersal charged that the announce clause limited his right to free speech and made a mockery of the election process by denying him the ability to wage a meaningful campaign. The Republican Party of Minnesota joined in Wersal's lawsuit, arguing that the restrictions prevented the Party from learning Wersal's views on the issues and thus making an informed decision to oppose or support his candidacy.

The district court found that the announce clause did not violate the Constitution. Wersal appealed to the United States Court of Appeals for the Eighth Circuit, and they affirmed the district court's decision. Wersal then filed for a writ of certiorari to the United States Supreme Court, which was granted.

== The decision ==
In a 5–4 ruling, the Supreme Court reversed the Eighth Circuit and declared Minnesota's announce clause to be in violation of the First Amendment. The Court reasoned that Minnesota's announce clause "burden[ed] a category of speech that is at the core of First Amendment freedoms -- speech about the qualifications of candidates for public office." The Court concluded that the announce clause was not narrowly tailored to serve the state's compelling interest in judicial impartiality and therefore failed the test of strict scrutiny.

== Post-decision ==
In 2006, a retired Justice O'Connor expressed concern about her vote in the White case, stating, "That (Minnesota) case, I confess, does give me pause."

== See also ==
- James Bopp
- List of United States Supreme Court cases, volume 536
- Rutan v. Republican Party
