= Zelman v. Simmons-Harris =

- Supreme Court of the United States

Argued February 20, 2002 Decided June 27, 2002
- Full case name: Susan Tave Zelman, Superintendent of Public Instruction of Ohio, et al., Petitioners v. Doris Simmons-Harris, et al.
- Docket no.: 00-1751
- Citations: 536 U.S. 639 (more) 122 S. Ct. 2460; 153 L. Ed. 2d 604; 2002 U.S. LEXIS 4885; 70 U.S.L.W. 4683; 2002 Cal. Daily Op. Service 5788; 2002 Daily Journal DAR 7295; 15 Fla. L. Weekly Fed. S 490

Case history
- Prior: On writs of certiorari to the United States Court of Appeals for the Sixth Circuit. Simmons-Harris v. Zelman, 234 F.3d 945, 2000 U.S. App. LEXIS 31367, 2000 Fed. App. 411P (6th Cir. 2000)

Holding
- The Ohio school voucher program does not violate the Establishment Clause even if the vouchers could be used for private, religious schools, because it passed a five-part test developed by the court in the case.

Court membership
- Chief Justice William Rehnquist Associate Justices John P. Stevens · Sandra Day O'Connor; Antonin Scalia · Anthony Kennedy; David Souter · Clarence Thomas; Ruth Bader Ginsburg · Stephen Breyer

Case opinions
- Majority: Rehnquist, joined by O'Connor, Scalia, Kennedy, Thomas
- Concurrence: O'Connor
- Concurrence: Thomas
- Dissent: Stevens
- Dissent: Souter, joined by Stevens, Ginsburg, Breyer
- Dissent: Breyer, joined by Stevens, Souter

Laws applied
- U.S. Const. amend. I

Zelman v. Simmons-Harris, 536 U.S. 639 (2002), was a 5–4 decision of the United States Supreme Court that upheld an Ohio program that used school vouchers. The Court decided that the program did not violate the Establishment Clause of the First Amendment, as long as parents using the program were allowed to choose among a range of secular and religious schools.

The decision was said to be "the most important ruling on religion and the schools in the 40 years since the court declared organized prayer in the public schools to be unconstitutional" by Linda Greenhouse of the New York Times. Then-president George W. Bush said the case was "just as historic" as Brown v. Board of Education. The Wall Street Journal editorial page said, "The U.S. Supreme Court yesterday struck the great blow for equal public education since Brown v. Board of Education in 1954. In the process, it also stripped away the last Constitutional and moral fig leaf from those who want to keep minority kids trapped in failing public schools."

Moderate Justices Anthony Kennedy and Sandra Day O'Connor and conservative Justices William Rehnquist, Antonin Scalia, and Clarence Thomas combined to form the majority.

== Background ==
The public schools in many of the poorer parts of Cleveland were deemed failures, and the legislature enacted the Pilot Project Scholarship Program in an effort to address the problem. Ohio had been running the program, which allowed parents of qualified students in the Cleveland School District, from the 1996–97 school year, to use public money to pay for tuition at private schools in the program, which included religious schools.

Of the 56 private schools that participated in the program, 46 were sectarian. The program aimed to improve the low educational performance of the students in the school district.

The program provided tuition vouchers for up to $2,250 a year to some parents of students in the school district to attend participating public or private schools in the city and neighboring suburbs. The program also allocated tutorial aid for students who remained in public schools. At the time the case was heard, approximately 4,000 of Cleveland's 57,000 elementary-age public school pupils took part in the program.

The vouchers were distributed to parents according to their financial needs. The parents chose where to enroll their children. Since the number of students applying to the program exceeded the number of vouchers available, recipients were chosen by lottery from among the eligible families. In the 1999–2000 school year, 82% of the participating private schools had a religious affiliation. None of the adjacent suburban public schools joined the program. 96% of the students receiving vouchers chose to enroll in religiously affiliated schools and 60% were from low-income families, at or below the poverty line.

Participating schools were not permitted to discriminate on the basis of race, religion, or ethnic background. They were also not allowed to "advocate or foster unlawful behavior or teach hatred of any person or group on the basis of race, ethnicity, national origin, or religion."

The lawsuit was initiated when a group of Ohio taxpayers filed an action against Susan Zelman, the superintendent of public education in Ohio, arguing that the program violated the Establishment Clause. Simmons-Harris, along with other residents of the Cleveland area, argued that the government "could not pay tuition for students to attend religious school". Represented by the Institute for Justice, a group of parents of students who participated in the program intervened in the lawsuit to defend the program.

The local federal district court, in addition to the Court of Appeals for the Sixth Circuit, ruled in favor of Simmons-Harris. Zelman and the intervening parents continued the case and appealed to the Supreme Court of the United States, which sustained the voucher program.

== First Amendment ==
The First Amendment protects the rights to freedom of religion and to freedom of expression from government interference. The First Amendment comes into play because the taxpayers of Ohio said that the program was a violation of the Establishment Clause, one of the two clauses of the First Amendment. The Establishment Clause guarantees freedom of religion and strictly prohibits the government from passing any legislation to establish an official religion or preferring one religion over another; it thus enforces the "separation of church and state."

The program, which operated on the private choice of parents, provided no incentive for parents to choose religious private, secular private, or public schools. Nevertheless, the taxpayers did not want their money to pay for the children who wanted religious schooling.

== Majority opinion ==
Chief Justice Rehnquist delivered the majority opinion, which held that the school voucher program was not in violation of the Establishment Clause. The ruling recognized that the voucher program did not encourage families to choose religious schools, but was instead religiously neutral, and that it operated on the private choice of parents.

Rehnquist's decision determined that the program in question aimed at secular assistance for the poor, low-performing children, who would otherwise have no options in a failing school district. He wrote in the decision that the program had been "enacted for the valid secular purpose of providing educational assistance to poor children in a demonstrably failing public school system."

In determining whether the school voucher program encouraged or inhibited religion directly, the court noted that whether the aid went to parents or to private schools was a relevant factor in how it ruled. According to the precedent of the time, including Mueller v. Allen (1983), aid can constitutionally be given to parents but not to schools. The Court found that because the aid went to parents, who then determined how to spend it, the program did not violate the Establishment Clause.

Addressing the fact that at the time the lawsuit was filed, approximately 96% of scholarship recipients used the voucher to attend a religious institution, the majority opinion noted that the program actually provided disincentives for religious schools: the private school received only half of that allocated to community schools and only a third of that allocated to magnet schools.

== Concurring opinions ==
Justice O'Connor and Justice Thomas each wrote a separate concurring opinion.

=== O'Connor ===
O'Connor strongly believed that the program made no real and clear distinction between religious and non-religious schools and that both were rational education alternatives. O'Connor mentioned in her concurrence that many beneficiaries used community and private non-religious schools. That and the fact that true private school choice was available meant, in her view, that the program did not violate the Establishment Clause.

She focused on a few specific points. First, like the majority, she emphasized that its inquiry required an evaluation of all reasonable educational options that Ohio provided to the Cleveland school system, regardless of whether they were formally made available in the same section of the Ohio Code as the voucher program. She insisted that the facts were critical in cases arising under the Establishment Clause by saying that failing to look at all of the educational options would "ignore how the educational system in Cleveland actually functions."

Also, she believed that the "decision, when considered in light of other longstanding government programs that impact religious organizations and our prior Establishment Clause jurisprudence, [does not] mark a dramatic break from the past."

Finally, she wrote in her concurrence, "The share of public resources that reach religious schools is not... as significant as respondents suggest.... $8.2 million is no small sum, it pales in comparison to the amount of funds that federal, state, and local governments already provide religious institutions" without there being any serious question regarding the constitutionality of such support. Her conclusion in the case, like in many other cases, was tied closely to the facts of the case.

=== Thomas ===
Thomas's opinion focused on the civil rights implications of the case: "Frederick Douglass once said that 'education... means emancipation. It means light and liberty. It means the uplifting of the soul of man into the glorious light of truth, the light by which men can only be made free.' Today many of our inner-city public schools deny emancipation to urban minority students. Despite this Court's observation nearly 50 years ago in Brown v. Board of Education, that 'it is doubtful that any child may reasonably be expected to succeed in life if he is denied the opportunity of an education,' urban children have been forced into a system that continually fails them. These cases present an example of such failures. Besieged by escalating financial problems and declining academic achievement, the Cleveland City School District was in the midst of an academic emergency when Ohio enacted its scholarship program."

Thomas gave another strong concurrence to this Supreme Court decision: "The protection of religious liberty using the Fourteenth Amendment is legitimate, but to use the Establishment Clause to prevent the operation of a perfectly neutral program concerning school choice is not." Thomas simply asserted that all this program did was essentially provide an educational opportunity to a range of disadvantaged minority children.

== Dissenting opinions ==
Justice Stevens and Justice Souter wrote separate dissenting opinions.

=== Stevens ===
Justice Stevens's dissenting opinion focused on the method by which the majority reached its conclusions. In his view, the Court "should ignore three factual matters that are discussed at length." Specifically, he argued that the Court should not consider the severe educational crisis that confronted the school district when Ohio enacted its voucher program, the wide range of choices that have been made available to students within the public school system, or the voluntary character of the private choice to prefer a private religious education over a public secular education.

=== Souter ===
Justice Souter's dissenting opinion presented the voucher program as using the taxpayers for religious and secular instruction. He referenced Everson v. Board of Education, which holds that no tax can be used to support religious activity. Because Ohio's school voucher program offered aid to those who wished to attend religious private schools, it directly violated Everson. Furthermore, allowing vouchers to be used with religious schooling advanced sectarian learning and institutions.

Souter argued that ignoring the ruling of Everson ignored the importance of neutrality and private choice. However, disregarding Everson promoted a new way of thinking that held government aid as insignificant in constitutional grounds. He commented on the voucher money that was going to religious schools as a reflection of free choice by families: "The 96.6% reflects, instead the fact that too few nonreligious school desks are available and few, but religious schools can afford to accept more than a handful of voucher students.... For the overwhelming number of children in the voucher scheme, the only alternative to the public schools is religious."

== Private choice test ==
The Zelman decision laid out a five-part test, the "private choice test", to determine whether a particular state voucher program runs afoul of the Establishment Clause.

The decision holds that to withstand constitutional scrutiny, a state voucher program that allows parents to use voucher funding to pay for tuition at private religious schools must meet all five points of the test. They are:

- The program must have a valid secular purpose.
- Aid must go to parents, not schools.
- A broad class of beneficiaries must be covered.
- The program must be neutral with respect to religion.
- There must be adequate nonreligious options.

The court ruled that the Ohio program met the test:

- The valid secular purpose of the program was "providing educational assistance to poor children in a demonstrably failing public school system."
- The vouchers were given to the parents.
- The "broad class" was all students enrolled in currently failing programs.
- Parents who received vouchers were not required to enroll in a religious-based school.
- There were other public schools in adjoining districts as well as nonreligious private schools in the Cleveland area that would accept the vouchers.

Rehnquist, writing for the majority, stated, "The incidental advancement of a religious mission, or the perceived endorsement of a religious message, is reasonably attributable to the individual aid recipients not the government, whose role ends with the disbursement of benefits." There was no need for parents to use religious schools, and if the law did not especially encourage the use of vouchers for religious schools, the fact that most parents chose parochial schools was irrelevant. Funding was given to the parents to disburse as they chose, but in Lemon v. Kurtzman, the funding at question was given directly to the schools, which failed the test.

In his concurring opinion, Thomas emphasized that voucher programs, like the one in the case, were essential because "failing urban public schools disproportionately affect minority children most in need of educational opportunity." He wrote that vouchers and other forms of publicly funded private school choice are necessary to give families an opportunity to enroll their children in better, private schools. Otherwise, "the core purposes of the Fourteenth Amendment" would be frustrated.

The dissenting opinions disagreed, and Stevens wrote that "the voluntary character of the private choice to prefer a parochial education over an education in the public school system seems to me quite irrelevant to the question whether the government's choice to pay for religious indoctrination is constitutionally permissible." Souter questioned how the Court could both keep Everson as precedent and decide the case as it did. His dissent also claimed that religious education and secular education can't be separated, and that any plan like the Ohio plan at stake in the decision would therefore automatically violate the Establishment Clause.

== Blaine Amendments ==
At the time Zelman was decided, many state constitutions included so-called Blaine Amendments, which specifically forbid state funding of religious and/or sectarian schools. As a question of state, not federal, law, Ohio's Blaine Amendment was not considered by federal courts in the case.

Florida's Opportunity Scholarship voucher program was ruled unconstitutional on Blaine grounds in a split 8-5 First District Court of Appeal ruling two years after Zelman in November 2004. The issue was argued before the Florida Supreme Court in 2005, with voucher advocates hoping to take the case to the U.S. Supreme Court in an effort to invalidate Blaine Amendments nationwide, following the Zelman decision. However, the Florida Supreme Court sidestepped the issue and declared the program unconstitutional on separate grounds in an effort to avoid U.S. Supreme Court scrutiny.

On June 30, 2020, the Supreme Court of the United States ruled in Espinoza v. Montana Department of Revenue that Montana's no-aid provision, a Blaine amendment, had been inappropriately used to block tax-credit scholarship funds for private schooling from being used at religious schools in violation of the Free Exercise Clause. The ruling effectively stated that if states offered scholarship funds that could be used at private schools, they could not discriminate against schools with a religious status or identity. Two years later, in Carson v. Makin, the Court held that a state voucher program cannot discriminate against schools because of the religious instruction that they provide.

== See also ==
- List of United States Supreme Court cases, volume 536
- List of United States Supreme Court cases
- Lemon v. Kurtzman (1971)
