= US Airways, Inc. v. Barnett =

- Supreme Court of the United States

Argued December 4, 2001 Decided April 29, 2002
- Full case name: US Airways, Incorporated v. Robert Barnett
- Citations: 535 U.S. 391 (more)

Holding
- A job position does not count as a reasonable accommodation under the ADA when another employee is entitled to that position under a seniority system

Court membership
- Chief Justice William Rehnquist Associate Justices John P. Stevens · Sandra Day O'Connor; Antonin Scalia · Anthony Kennedy; David Souter · Clarence Thomas; Ruth Bader Ginsburg · Stephen Breyer

Case opinions
- Majority: Breyer, joined by Rehnquist, Stevens, O’Connor, Kennedy
- Concurrence: Stevens
- Concurrence: O'Connor
- Dissent: Scalia, joined by Thomas
- Dissent: Souter, joined by Ginsburg

Laws applied
- Americans with Disabilities Act of 1990

US Airways, Inc. v. Barnett, (2002), was a case in the United States Supreme Court that dealt with issues related to the Americans with Disabilities Act of 1990 (ADA) and reasonable accommodations in the workplace. The Court held that even requests for accommodation that might seem reasonable on their face, such as a transfer to a different position, can be rendered unreasonable if they would require a violation of the company's seniority system.

While the Court ruled that, in general, a violation of a seniority system renders an otherwise reasonable accommodation unreasonable, a plaintiff can present evidence that, despite the seniority system, the accommodation is reasonable in the specific case at hand, for example, the plaintiff could offer evidence that the seniority system is so often disregarded that another exception wouldn't make a difference. The court also held that the defendant need not provide proof that this particular application of the seniority system should prevail, and that, once the defendant showed that the accommodation violated the seniority system, it fell to the plaintiff (Barnett) to show it was nevertheless reasonable.

== Factual background ==
The case involved Robert Barnett, a US Airways employee who injured his back, rendering him physically unable to perform his cargo-handling job. Using his seniority, Barnett transferred to a less-demanding mailroom job. However, this position later became open to seniority-based bidding and was bid on by more senior employees. Barnett requested the accommodation of being allowed to remain in the less-demanding mailroom job. US Airways denied his request, and he ultimately lost his job.

== Decision ==
The Supreme Court decision invalidated both the approach of the district court, which found that the mere presence and importance of the seniority system was enough to warrant a summary judgment in favor of US Airways, as well as the circuit court's approach that interpreted 'reasonable accommodation' as 'effective accommodation'.

== Significance ==
This case clarified the standards surrounding reasonable accommodations under the ADA and emphasized the importance of considering the impact of seniority systems in employment decisions.
