= Free Speech Coalition v. Paxton =

Free Speech Coalition, Inc. v. Paxton
- Supreme Court of the United States

Argued January 15, 2025 Decided June 27, 2025
- Full case name: Free Speech Coalition, Inc., et al. v. Ken Paxton, Attorney General of Texas
- Docket no.: 23-1122
- Argument: Oral argument
- Decision: Opinion

Case history
- Prior: Preliminary injunction granted, Free Speech Coalition v. Colmenero, No. 1:23-CV-917-DAE (W.D. Tex. August 31, 2023); Injunction vacated, Free Speech Coalition v. Paxton, 95 F.4th 263 (5th Cir. 2024); Stay denied, 601 U.S. ___, No. 23A925 (April 30, 2024)

Questions presented
- Whether the court of appeals erred as a matter of law in applying rational-basis review to a law burdening adults' access to protected speech, instead of strict scrutiny as this Court and other circuits have consistently done.

Holding
- H. B. 1181 triggers, and survives, review under intermediate scrutiny because it only incidentally burdens the protected speech of adults.

Court membership
- Chief Justice John Roberts Associate Justices Clarence Thomas · Samuel Alito; Sonia Sotomayor · Elena Kagan; Neil Gorsuch · Brett Kavanaugh; Amy Coney Barrett · Ketanji Brown Jackson

Case opinions
- Majority: Thomas, joined by Roberts, Alito, Gorsuch, Kavanaugh, Barrett
- Dissent: Kagan, joined by Sotomayor, Jackson

Free Speech Coalition, Inc. v. Paxton, 606 U.S. 461 (2025), is a landmark United States Supreme Court case allowing states to require Internet pornography websites to verify the age of viewers in order to prevent access by minors. In a 6–3 decision in June 2025, the Supreme Court ruled that Texas's age-verification law passed intermediate scrutiny and only incidentally burdened the protected speech of adults.

== Background ==
=== Prior case law ===
States laws banning the sale of pornography to minors were first upheld in Ginsberg v. New York (1968) when the Supreme Court, applying rational basis review, provided the material was "obscene as to minors" – even if it would not meet an ordinary legal test for obscenity as to adults. With Miller v. California (1973), the Supreme Court established the presiding standard for evaluating obscenity, the Miller test, which uses three prongs, whether the material judged by "community standards" would be considered to be of prurient interest, whether the material illustrates sexual content as defined by state law, and whether the material lacks any serious literary, artistic, political, or scientific value.

Subsequent cases applied strict scrutiny when laws restricted adult access to speech that was only obscene for minors. The Supreme Court ruled in Reno v. American Civil Liberties Union (1997) that the bulk of the Communications Decency Act (CDA) was unconstitutional. The CDA would have made it illegal to knowingly send obscene material to minors. In contrast to Ginsberg, the court applied strict scrutiny to laws that attempted to restrict free speech on the Internet, and that the CDA placed an "unacceptably heavy burden on protected speech". After Congress passed the Child Online Protection Act (COPA) in 1998, which required commercial websites to include age-verification checks for material deemed harmful to children, it was challenged twice at the Supreme Court by civil rights groups. In the first case, Ashcroft v. American Civil Liberties Union I in 2002, the court ruled that the codification for the use of "community standards" in evaluating the Miller test for impacted material would restrict speech on the Internet to the most puritan standards, and deemed that portion of the law unconstitutional. The whole of the COPA was deemed unconstitutional in Ashcroft v. American Civil Liberties Union II (2004), with the court ruling that by strict scrutiny, the government had not shown that voluntary use of filtering software by parents – a less restrictive alternative – was inadequate to meet the government's interest in protecting minors.

Since Reno and both Ashcroft cases, lawmakers have sought to find ways to place access controls and other restrictions on obscene material, with the aim to find laws that would be reviewed in courts through either weaker intermediate scrutiny or rational basis reviews rather than the strict scrutiny of these cases.

=== Case background ===
In 2023, the Texas Legislature enacted House Bill 1181, a law requiring age-verification on websites with more than a third of its content "harmful to minors", by a broad bipartisan vote. The Free Speech Coalition (FSC), a trade association for the pornography and adult entertainment industry, sued to challenge the law. By the FSC's count, Texas was among 23 states that had adopted similar laws in 2023 or 2024.

The district court struck down the provision, but the United States Court of Appeals for the Fifth Circuit reversed that ruling and upheld the age-verification requirement. However, the Fifth Circuit affirmed the district court's decision to strike down another provision of H.B. 1181 that required the websites to post warnings about health dangers of pornography. Whereas the district court used the strict scrutiny standard to evaluate the law, the Fifth Circuit used a rational basis review, which places more weight on the state's purpose for the law than on rights infringement.

The majority opinion for the Fifth Circuit panel was by Judge Jerry Smith, who said that the age-verification requirement was within the state's legitimate interest in preventing minors' access to pornography. Judge Patrick Higginbotham dissented, saying that the law infringed adults' protected speech and had chilling effects.

The Supreme Court declined to block the Texas law, pending appeal.

== Supreme Court ==
The Supreme Court agreed on July 2, 2024, to review the case, and it heard oral arguments on January 15, 2025. Besides the parties to the case, the Biden administration was given time to present arguments challenging the Fifth Circuit's ruling, neither in support nor opposition to the law, but to argue that the Fifth Circuit should have evaluated the law under strict scrutiny. Court observers stated that the six conservative justices along with the more liberal Kagan appeared to be in favor of requiring tighter controls to access pornography; the conditions around Ashcroft, where the Court had ruled that filtering software could be used, were no longer reasonable due to the ubiquitousness of devices like iPhones and youth typically being more tech savvy than their parents and able to bypass these filters. Only Alito supported the use of the rational basis standard to review the Texas law, while the other Justices suggested an intermediate scrutiny that would allow states to require verification for pornography but not for all sexually related materials, such as information related to LGBTQ culture.

On June 27, 2025, the Court upheld the Texas law by a 6–3 vote, holding that the age-verification law "only incidentally burdens the protected speech of adults."

Justice Clarence Thomas wrote for the majority. The Court ruled that the Fifth Circuit should have used the intermediate scrutiny test, and the Texas age-verification law passed that test even though it was a content-based restriction, because obscenity is not always constitutionally protected. The Court said technology had changed since 1997, when the Court's first decision about the internet Reno was decided: "Reno and Ashcroft II...both dealt with 'the internet' as it existed in the 1990s" when there was no mobile internet or streaming content.

Justice Elena Kagan dissented, arguing that the Texas law should have been reviewed under the strict scrutiny standard. She said speech that was obscene for minors is allowed for adults who might "forgo that speech" if forced to comply with age-verification laws. Justices Sonia Sotomayor and Ketanji Brown Jackson joined the dissent.

== Legacy ==
The case is one of three cases decided in 2025 involving parental rights or the "protection" of minors. The conservative majority on the court also held that parents must be able to opt their children out of books assigned at school and that state can ban hormone therapy and hormone blockers for the treatment of minors with gender dysphoria. The Texas law in this case received intermediate scrutiny because rational basis review applies only to "laws that do not implicate fundamental rights."
