= New York Civil Liberties Union =

Legal advocacy organization in New York State

- Abbreviation: NYCLU
- Founded: 1951; 75 years ago in New York, United States of America
- Type: 501(c)(4)
- Region served: New York (state)
- Members: 50,000
- Key people: Donna Lieberman
- Parent organization: American Civil Liberties Union
- Website: www.nyclu.org

The New York Civil Liberties Union (NYCLU) is a civil rights organization in the United States. Founded in November 1951 as the New York affiliate of the American Civil Liberties Union, it is a not-for-profit, nonpartisan organization with nearly 50,000 members across New York State.

The NYCLU has eight offices in New York State: Central New York (the Syracuse area), the Capital Region (the Albany area), Lower Hudson Valley, Suffolk County, Nassau County, New York City, Genesee Valley and the Western Region. The New York City office is its headquarters and represents all regions that do not have their local chapter or regional office.

== Mission statement ==
The NYCLU's stated mission is "to defend and promote the fundamental principles and values embodied in the Bill of Rights, the U.S Constitution and the New York State Constitution, including freedom of speech, freedom of religion, and the right to privacy, equality and due process of law for all New Yorkers".

== Recent work ==
=== Stop-and-Frisk ===
The NYCLU helped stop the NYPD's practice of keeping a computer database of personal information of civilians who were stopped and/or frisked by police officers. On June 23, 2010, the State Senate passed a bill sponsored by Assemblyman Hakeem Jeffries (D-57th AD) and Sen. Eric Adams (D-20th SD), which called for the NYPD to shut down this database. On June 29, 2010, the New York State Assembly passed the bill and Governor Paterson signed the bill into law on July 16, 2010.

=== School-to-prison pipeline ===
In January 2010, the NYCLU, ACLU, and Dorsey & Whitney LLP filed a federal class action lawsuit challenging the NYPD's practice of arresting and using force against children in New York City schools.

=== Public defense ===
The NYCLU filed the class action lawsuit Hurrell-Harring et al. v. State of New York in 2007. They challenged New York State's failure in its duty to provide effective counsel to New Yorkers who were accused of crimes and could not afford to pay private lawyers. This case targets the public defense systems in Onondaga, Ontario, Schuyler, Suffolk and Washington counties for failing to provide adequate public defense services. The case was filed on behalf of defendants from these five counties. On August 1, 2008, a State Supreme Court judge denied the state's motion to dismiss the case. In July 2009, the Third Department of the Appellate Division, in a split decision, reversed the lower court's denial of the state's motion to dismiss. In May 2010, the State Court of Appeals, New York's highest court, overturned the Third Department in a 4-to-3 ruling, allowing the case to proceed.

=== Reproductive Health Act ===
The NYCLU supported the Reproductive Health Act, which guaranteed a woman's ability to have an abortion if her health is at risk and that state law will regulate abortion as a medical procedure. The Reproductive Health Act was introduced in the New York State Assembly by Assembly member Deborah Glick, D-66th A.D, in June 2010. It was introduced to the State Senate by Andrea Stewart-Cousins, D-35th S.D., during the 2009 legislative session.

=== Kings County Hospital ===
In May 2007, the NYCLU (attorney Chris Hansen), Mental Hygiene Legal Services, and Kirkland & Ellis LLP filed a lawsuit against Kings County Hospital Center in Brooklyn. The case described the hospital's psychiatric emergency room and inpatient unit as "a chamber of filth, decay, indifference and danger". It sought to end abusive treatment in the hospital's psychiatric facilities. NYCLU released security camera footage of a woman dying on the hospital's waiting room floor after hospital staff ignored her for hours. Under a settlement, the hospital agreed to significant reforms and monitoring for five years by the NYCLU, the Department of Justice, Mental Hygiene Legal Services and Kirkland & Ellis LLP.

=== Tabbaa v. Chertoff ===
Many of the Americans attending the Reviving the Islamic Spirit Conference in Toronto in 2004 ended up frisked, interrogated, fingerprinted and photographed and profiles added to databases by U.S. Customs and Border Protection agents at the U.S.‑Canada border. This incident occurred due to a federal policy targeting people who attended Islamic conferences outside of the United States. In 2005, NYCLU, ACLU, and the Council on American-Islamic Relations filed suit against the Department of Homeland Security on behalf of five detained Muslim Americans. Accusing the US CBP of violating both the First and Fourth Amendments of the constitution. In 2005 the District Court ruled that the law did not violate the plaintiffs' constitutional rights. The Second Circuit Court of Appeals affirmed the lower court's decision upon appeal.

== See also ==
- The New York Foundation
- American Civil Liberties Union
- American Civil Rights Union

== General Reference ==
- New York Civil Liberties Union (NYCLU), Capital Region Chapter Records, 1970-2019. M.E. Grenander Department of Special Collections and Archives, University Libraries, University at Albany, State University of New York (hereafter referred to as the NYCLU, Capital Region Chapter Records).
