= Patrick Ball =

American statistician and human rights advocate

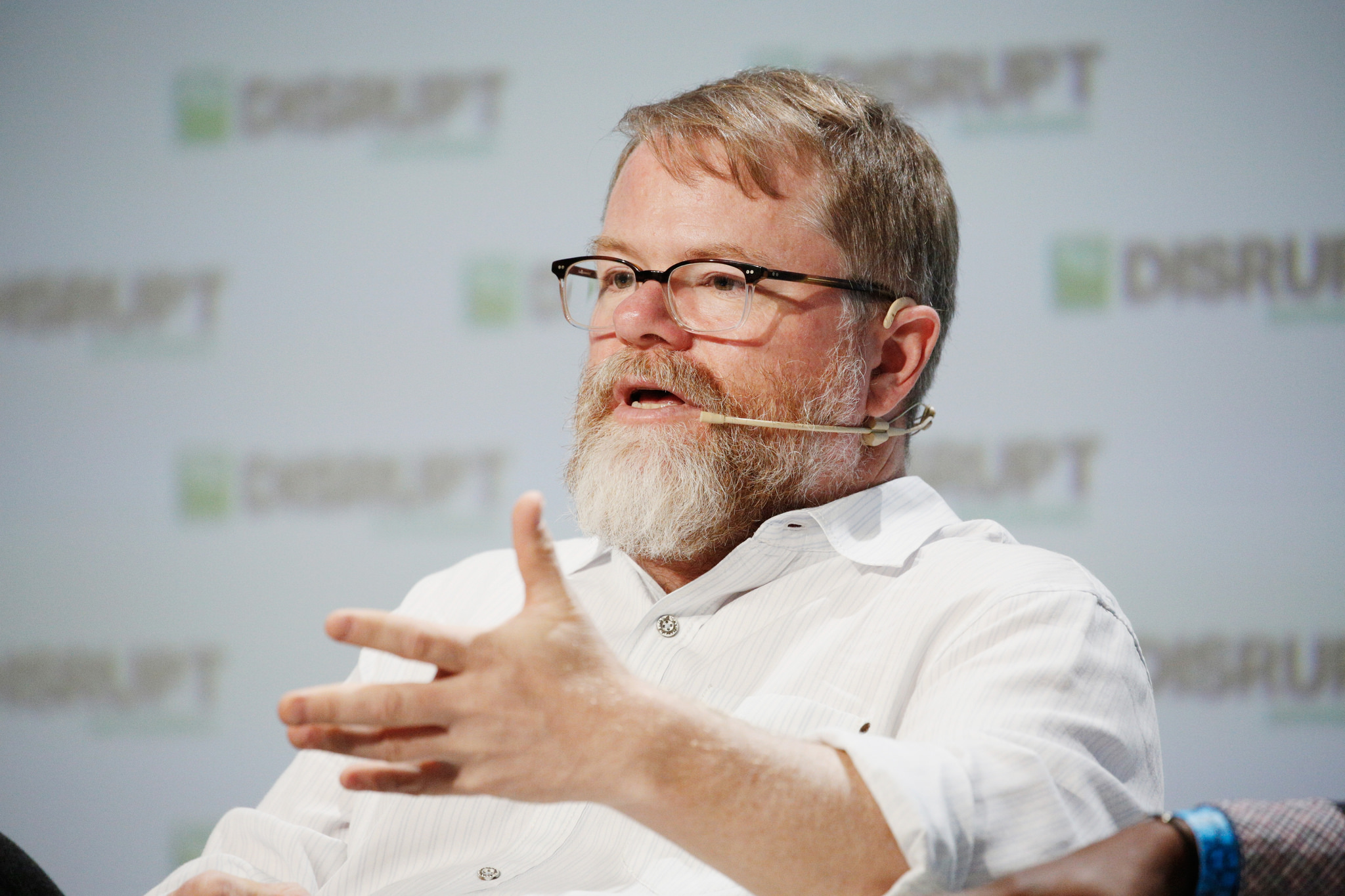
- Ball at TechCrunch Disrupt in 2018
- Born: June 26, 1965 (age 61)
- Education: Columbia University; University of Michigan
- Occupation: Scientist
- Employer: Human Rights Data Analysis Group
- Known for: Human Rights Stats
- Title: Director of Research

Patrick Ball (born June 26, 1965) is an American statistician known for his quantitative analysis of human rights violations. He has provided statistical analysis for truth commissions, non-governmental organizations, international criminal tribunals, and United Nations missions. As director of research at the Human Rights Data Analysis Group, he conducts statistical analyses to document patterns of human rights abuses.

== Education ==
Ball earned a Bachelor of Arts degree from Columbia University, and a doctorate from the University of Michigan in 1998.

== Human rights and cryptography export controls ==
In the 1990s, Ball advocated for the availability of cryptographic technology amid the debates over its export by U.S. software developers.

In 1993, he began working with the Science and Human Rights Program of the AAAS, initially as a consultant and eventually as deputy director. His work with the AAAS included traveling to El Salvador and Ethiopia to train local human rights organizations on the use of cryptography and the internet to protect their communications. The Science and Human Rights Program also organized or co-organized symposiums, including a congressional briefing at which Ball presented alongside Matt Blaze, Ian Goldberg, and Dinah PoKempner.

In 1997, Ball provided testimony in ACLU v. Miller, a case from the civil liberties group challenging a Georgia law barring online pseudonymity as unconstitutionally vague and overbroad.

== Expert testimony in war crimes trials ==
Ball testified at the International Criminal Tribunal for the former Yugoslavia against Slobodan Milosevic. He also testified as a witness for the Prosecution at the International Criminal Tribunal for the former Yugoslavia in Milutinović et al. (IT-05-87).

In 2013, Ball provided testimony in Guatemala's Supreme Court in the trial of General José Efraín Ríos Montt, the de facto president of Guatemala in 1982-1983. Ríos was convicted of genocide and crimes against humanity. Ball also testified in 2013 in the trial of Guatemala's former national police chief, Héctor Rafael Bol de la Cruz, who was sentenced to 40 years in prison for the disappearance of a student union leader.

In September 2015, Ball testified in the trial of former President of Chad, Hissène Habré. The analysis from HRDAG revealed that the death rate for political prisoners was significantly higher than that of adult men in Chad. During a nine-month span from 1986 to 1987, the mortality rate in Habré's prisons surpassed that of U.S. POWs held by the Japanese during World War II.

== Awards ==
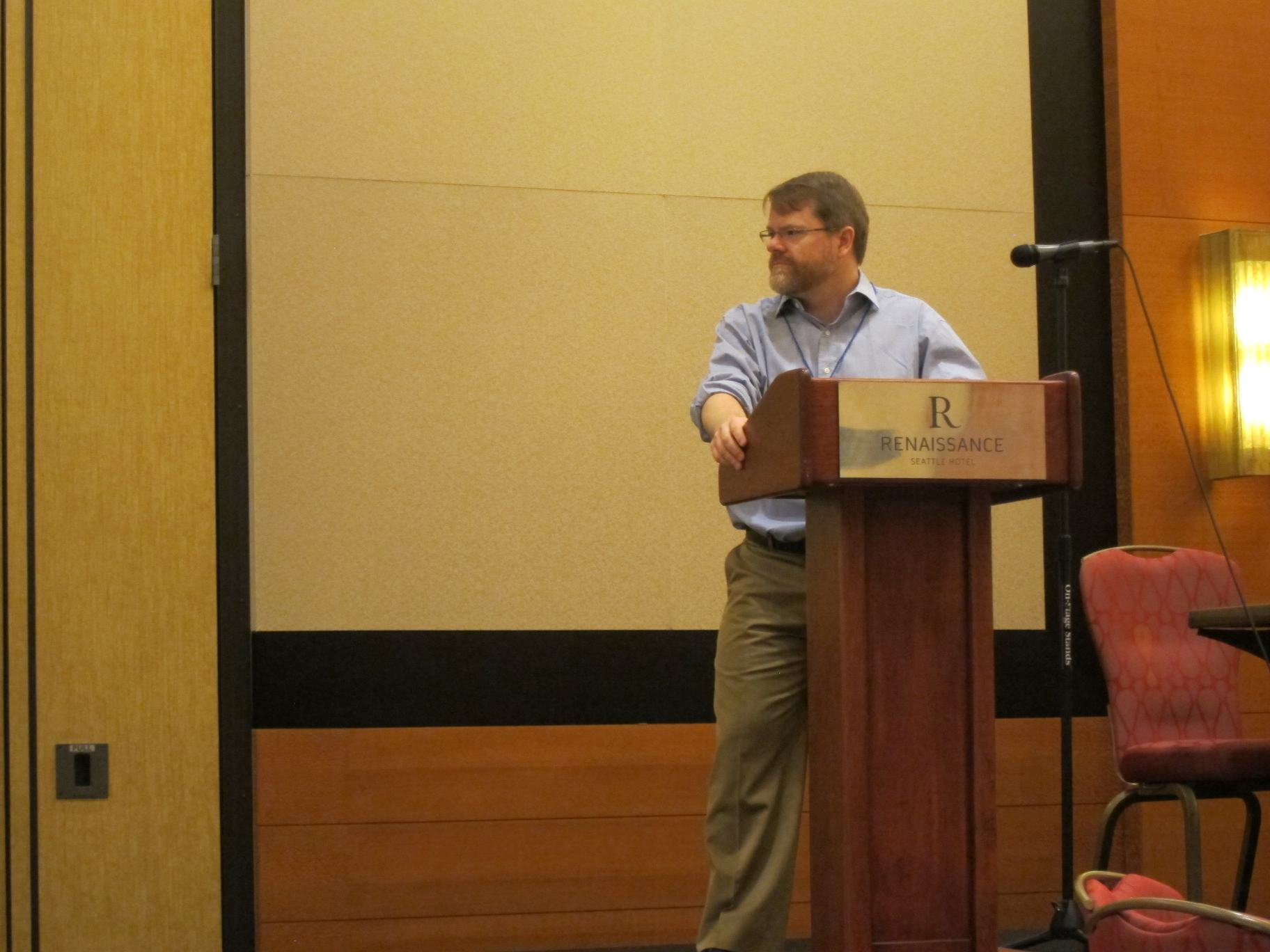
Patrick Ball delivering keynote speech at IEEE GHTC, 1 Nov 2011.

Patrick Ball was awarded the John Maddox Prize in 2024 by the Nature Awards and Sense About Science for his work in identifying, cataloguing and prosecuting war crimes using statistical and mathematical modeling. In 2018, the American Statistical Association gave Ball the Karl E. Peace Award for Outstanding Statistical Contributions for the Betterment of Society. Ball was conferred a Doctor of Science honoris causa by Claremont Graduate University in 2015. In 2014, he was named a Fellow by the American Statistical Association. Other awards include the Pioneer Award from the Electronic Frontier Foundation in 2005, the Eugene L. Lawler Award for Humanitarian Contributions within Computer Science from the Association for Computing Machinery (ACM) in June 2004, and a Special Achievement Award from the Social Statistics Section of the American Statistical Association in 2002. He is a research fellow at the Carnegie Mellon University Center for Human Rights Science, and a Fellow at the Human Rights Center at Berkeley Law of the University of California, Berkeley.

== Selected publications ==
- Amelia Hoover Green and Patrick Ball (2019). Civilian killings and disappearances during civil war in El Salvador (1980–1992). Demographic Research, 1 October 2019.
- Patrick Ball and Megan Price (2019). Using Statistics to Assess Lethal Violence in Civil and Inter-State War. Annual Review of Statistics and Its Application. 7 March 2019.
- Patrick Ball and Megan Price (2018). The Statistics of Genocide. Chance (special issue). February 2018.
- Patrick Ball (2016). The case against a golden key. Foreign Affairs. September 14, 2016. Foreign Affairs.
- Patrick Ball (2016). Violence in blue. Granta 134: 4 March 2016.
- Patrick Ball (2016). Why Just Counting the Dead in Syria Won’t Bring Them Justice. Foreign Policy. October 19, 2016.
- Megan Price and Patrick Ball (2014). Big Data, Selection Bias, and the Statistical Patterns of Mortality in Conflict. SAIS Review of International Affairs.
- Price, Megan, Jeff Klingner, and Patrick Ball (2013). Preliminary Statistical Analysis of Documentation of Killings in the Syrian Arab Republic, The Benetech Human Rights Program, commissioned by the United Nations Office of the High Commissioner for Human Rights (OHCHR).
- Patrick Ball. When It Comes to Human Rights, There Are No Online Security Shortcuts, Wired op-ed, August 10, 2012.
- Patrick Ball (2008). “¿Quién le hizo qué a quién? Planear e implementar un proyecto a gran escala de información en derechos humanos.” (originally in English at AAAS) Translated by Beatriz Verjerano. Palo Alto, California: Benetech.
- Patrick Ball, Tamy Guberek, Daniel Guzmán, Amelia Hoover, and Meghan Lynch (2007). “Assessing Claims of Declining Lethal Violence in Colombia.” Benetech. Also available in Spanish – “Para Evaluar Afirmaciones Sobre la Reducción de la Violencia Letal en Colombia.”
- Patrick Ball, Ewa Tabeau, and Philip Verwimp (2007). “The Bosnian Book of the Dead: Assessment of the Database (Full Report).” Households in Conflict Network Research Design Note 5.
- Silva, Romesh and Patrick Ball, "The Profile of Human Rights Violations in Timor-Leste, 1974-1999", a Report by the Benetech Human Rights Data Analysis Group to the Commission on Reception, Truth and Reconciliation. 9 February 2006.
- Silva, Romesh, and Patrick Ball. "The Demography of Large-Scale Human Rights Atrocities: Integrating demographic and statistical analysis into post-conflict historical clarification in Timor-Leste." Paper presented at the 2006 meetings of the Population Association of America.
- Silva, Romesh and Patrick Ball. "The Demography of Conflict-Related Mortality in Timor-Leste (1974-1999): Empirical Quantitative Measurement of Civilian Killings, Disappearances & Famine-Related Deaths" In Papers on Human Rights and Statistics, D. Banks, J. Asher and F. Scheuren, eds., ASA/SIAM Monograph Series, Philadelphia, PA (USA), pp. 42–57.
- Ball, Patrick. "On the Quantification of Horror: Field Notes on Statistical Analysis of Human Rights Violations." in Repression and Mobilization, ed. by Christian Davenport, Hank Johnston, and Carol Mueller. Minneapolis: U Minnesota P. 2005.
- Truth and Reconciliation Commission of Perú, Final Report - General Conclusions
- Davenport, Christian, and Patrick Ball. "Views to a Kill: Exploring the Implications of Source Selection in the Case of Guatemalan State Terror, 1977-1996." Journal of Conflict Resolution 46(3): 427-450. 2002.
- Killings and Refugee Flow in Kosovo, March - June, 1999
- Ball, Patrick (2001). "Making the case: the role of statistics in human rights reporting". Statistical Journal of the United Nations Economic Commission for Europe. 18 (2–3). IOS Press: 163–174. doi:10.3233/SJU-2001-182-305.
- Chapman, Audrey R. and Patrick Ball. "The Truth of Truth Commissions: Comparative Lessons from Haiti, South Africa, and Guatemala." Human Rights Quarterly. 23(4):1-42. 2001
- Policy or Panic? The Flight of Ethnic Albanians from Kosovo, March–May 1999
- Political Killings in Kosovo
- Making the Case: Investigating Large Scale Human Rights Violations Using Information Systems and Data Analysis. (ed. with Herbert F. Spirer and Louise Spirer). Washington, DC: AAAS, 2000.
- State Violence in Guatemala, 1960-1996: a Quantitative Reflection. (with Paul Kobrak and Herbert F. Spirer) Washington, DC: AAAS, 1999.
- Who Did What to Whom? Planning and Implementing a Large Scale Human Rights Data Project. Washington, DC: AAAS, 1996.
