= Ohio House Bill 96 =

2025 Ohio law

136th Ohio General Assembly
- Long title: To amend sections 3.15, 9.03, 9.07, 9.239, 9.24, 9.27, 9.28, 9.312, 9.331, 9.334, 9.35, 9.67, 9.681, 9.821, 101.30, 101.352, 101.53, 101.63, 101.65, 101.82, 101.83, 101.84, 102.02, 103.05, 103.051, 103.13, 103.65, 106.02, 106.021, 106.023, 106.024, 106.031, 107.03, 107.032, 107.033, 107.12, 109.02, 109.71, 109.73, 109.77, 109.803, 111.15, 111.27, 113.05, 113.13, 113.40, 113.51, 113.53, 113.78, 117.11, 117.38, 117.44, 117.56, 119.03, 119.04, 120.06, 120.08, 121.02, 121.03, 121.085, 121.22, 121.35, 121.36, 121.37, 121.93, 121.931, 121.95, 121.951, 121.953, 122.09, 122.14, 122.175, 122.1710, 122.41, 122.42, 122.47, 122.49, 122.53, 122.571, 122.59, 122.631, 122.632, 122.633, 122.6510, 122.6511, 122.6512, 122.66, 122.67, 122.68, 122.681, 122.69, 122.70, 122.701, 122.702, 122.84, 122.85, 122.86, 123.10, 123.28, 123.281, 124.02, 124.07, 124.135, 124.1310, 124.1312, 124.152, 124.385, 125.01, 125.041, 125.071, 125.11, 125.111, 125.13, 125.183, 125.31, 125.42, 125.58, 125.95, 126.24, 126.42, 126.60, 126.62, 127.12, 127.13, 127.16, 128.021, 128.41, 128.46, 128.54, 131.01, 131.02, 131.35, 131.43, 131.50, 131.51, 133.18, 135.01, 135.03, 135.143, 135.18, 135.35, 135.70, 135.71, 141.04, 145.012, 145.054, 145.055, 145.09, 145.091, 145.99, 148.01, 148.02, 148.04, 148.041, 148.042, 148.05, 148.10, 149.011, 149.10, 149.30, 149.3010, 149.311, 149.38, 149.43, 153.01, 153.07, 153.08, 153.09, 153.12, 153.13, 153.14, 153.501, 153.502, 153.54, 153.59, 153.63, 153.693, 155.33, 155.34, 163.01, 164.01, 164.05, 164.06, 164.08, 164.14, 165.04, 166.01, 166.02, 166.03, 166.08, 166.12, 166.17, 169.01, 169.05, 169.08, 169.13, 173.38, 173.381, 173.391, 173.50, 173.525, 175.16, 175.17, 303.12, 305.021, 305.03, 306.32, 306.322, 306.43, 307.05, 307.673, 307.696, 307.697, 307.86, 307.985, 308.13, 311.14, 317.20, 319.04, 319.202, 319.301, 319.302, 321.03, 323.131, 323.152, 323.153, 323.155, 323.156, 323.158, 323.611, 325.18, 325.25, 340.01, 340.011, 340.02, 340.021, 340.022, 340.03, 340.032, 340.034, 340.036, 340.037, 340.04, 340.041, 340.05, 340.07, 340.08, 340.09, 340.12, 340.13, 340.16, 345.01, 345.03, 345.04, 349.01, 355.04, 501.09, 501.11, 504.14, 505.24, 505.37, 505.48, 505.481, 507.09, 507.12, 511.28, 511.34, 513.18, 519.12, 523.06, 703.331, 703.34, 717.051, 718.01, 718.031, 718.05, 718.12, 718.13, 718.19, 718.85, 718.88, 718.90, 718.91, 731.14, 731.141, 731.29, 733.81, 735.05, 742.043, 742.044, 742.99, 749.31, 755.181, 901.43, 904.02, 904.04, 905.32, 905.57, 907.13, 907.14, 909.01, 909.02, 909.07, 909.08, 909.09, 909.13, 911.02, 913.23, 915.16, 915.24, 921.01, 921.02, 921.06, 921.09, 921.11, 921.12, 921.13, 921.14, 921.16, 921.23, 921.24, 923.42, 923.44, 923.51, 924.01, 924.30, 924.51, 927.53, 928.02, 928.03, 928.04, 935.06, 935.07, 935.09, 935.10, 935.16, 935.17, 935.20, 935.24, 943.04, 943.16, 943.26, 943.99, 956.07, 956.10, 956.13, 956.16, 956.18, 956.21, 956.22, 956.23, 1311.04, 1311.252, 1317.05, 1317.06, 1321.21, 1347.08, 1509.02, 1509.07, 1509.071, 1509.13, 1509.36, 1509.38, 1517.11, 1531.01, 1533.10, 1533.11, 1533.111, 1533.13, 1533.131, 1533.32, 1545.041, 1545.21, 1546.04, 1547.54, 1548.06, 1561.13, 1561.16, 1561.23, 1561.46, 1561.48, 1701.04, 1701.07, 1703.041, 1707.01, 1707.14, 1707.47, 1711.30, 1713.03, 1901.123, 1901.26, 1907.143, 1907.24, 2101.11, 2101.16, 2108.34, 2151.27, 2151.311, 2151.316, 2151.356, 2151.3527, 2151.416, 2151.4115, 2151.421, 2151.423, 2151.424, 2151.45, 2151.451, 2151.452, 2151.453, 2152.26, 2303.12, 2303.201, 2303.26, 2307.66, 2329.66, 2501.16, 2743.03, 2907.15, 2913.401, 2915.01, 2917.211, 2919.171, 2919.19, 2921.13, 2921.36, 2921.41, 2925.14, 2933.32, 2949.12, 2951.041, 2953.32, 2967.14, 2967.18, 2967.26, 2967.271, 2967.28, 2969.13, 2981.02, 3101.08, 3105.171, 3105.63, 3107.01, 3107.012, 3107.031, 3107.033, 3107.034, 3107.062, 3107.063, 3107.064, 3107.065, 3107.38, 3107.391, 3109.14, 3109.171, 3109.172, 3109.173, 3109.178, 3115.201, 3119.01, 3121.441, 3123.89, 3123.90, 3301.01, 3301.02, 3301.03, 3301.06, 3301.071, 3301.074, 3301.079, 3301.0711, 3301.0712, 3301.0714, 3301.0715, 3301.0723, 3301.0727, 3301.136, 3301.17, 3301.541, 3301.57, 3302.03, 3302.034, 3302.20, 3302.42, 3305.05, 3305.053, 3307.044, 3307.05, 3307.06, 3307.07, 3307.073, 3307.074, 3307.10, 3307.11, 3307.27, 3307.99, 3309.073, 3309.074, 3309.47, 3309.99, 3310.033, 3310.41, 3310.51, 3310.52, 3310.58, 3310.64, 3311.053, 3311.50, 3313.27, 3313.413, 3313.46, 3313.489, 3313.5313, 3313.603, 3313.608, 3313.609, 3313.6013, 3313.6022, 3313.6028, 3313.618, 3313.6113, 3313.6114, 3313.64, 3313.753, 3313.90, 3313.975, 3313.98, 3314.011, 3314.013, 3314.015, 3314.016, 3314.017, 3314.02, 3314.021, 3314.03, 3314.034, 3314.038, 3314.05, 3314.07, 3314.08, 3314.19, 3314.191, 3314.261, 3314.29, 3314.35, 3314.351, 3314.36, 3314.361, 3314.381, 3314.382, 3315.18, 3315.181, 3316.031, 3316.041, 3316.043, 3316.06, 3316.08, 3316.16, 3317.01, 3317.011, 3317.012, 3317.014, 3317.016, 3317.017, 3317.018, 3317.019, 3317.0110, 3317.02, 3317.021, 3317.022, 3317.024, 3317.026, 3317.0212, 3317.0213, 3317.0215, 3317.0217, 3317.03, 3317.035, 3317.051, 3317.06, 3317.11, 3317.16, 3317.161, 3317.162, 3317.163, 3317.20, 3317.201, 3317.22, 3317.25, 3318.01, 3318.032, 3318.051, 3318.06, 3318.061, 3318.062, 3318.063, 3318.12, 3318.361, 3318.40, 3318.45, 3318.48, 3319.073, 3319.088, 3319.111, 3319.223, 3319.236, 3319.263, 3319.29, 3319.301, 3319.311, 3319.51, 3320.04, 3321.16, 3321.19, 3321.22, 3323.32, 3325.08, 3325.16, 3325.17, 3326.11, 3326.44, 3326.51, 3327.017, 3327.08, 3327.10, 3328.16, 3328.24, 3332.081, 3333.04, 3333.041, 3333.129, 3333.13, 3333.131, 3333.132, 3333.133, 3333.134, 3333.135, 3333.164, 3333.24, 3333.374, 3334.11, 3335.39, 3339.06, 3344.07, 3345.06, 3345.382, 3345.48, 3345.591, 3345.71, 3345.74, 3345.75, 3352.16, 3354.19, 3358.08, 3358.11, 3364.07, 3365.15, 3375.15, 3375.22, 3375.30, 3375.39, 3375.92, 3379.03, 3379.12, 3381.03, 3381.11, 3381.17, 3501.01, 3501.02, 3501.05, 3501.12, 3501.17, 3501.28, 3505.03, 3505.04, 3505.06, 3505.33, 3505.38, 3513.04, 3513.05, 3513.052, 3513.10, 3513.19, 3517.01, 3517.08, 3517.081, 3517.092, 3517.10, 3517.102, 3517.103, 3517.104, 3517.108, 3517.109, 3517.1012, 3517.11, 3517.121, 3517.13, 3517.152, 3517.153, 3517.154, 3517.155, 3517.157, 3517.20, 3517.21, 3517.22, 3517.23, 3517.992, 3517.993, 3701.021, 3701.033, 3701.045, 3701.511, 3701.65, 3701.79, 3701.841, 3704.01, 3704.03, 3704.031, 3704.09, 3704.111, 3704.14, 3705.126, 3705.16, 3705.17, 3706.01, 3709.15, 3715.021, 3717.071, 3718.02, 3718.04, 3719.04, 3721.32, 3728.01, 3734.021, 3734.05, 3734.57, 3734.79, 3734.901, 3734.904, 3734.907, 3735.67, 3735.671, 3737.83, 3738.01, 3738.03, 3738.04, 3738.06, 3738.08, 3738.09, 3742.32, 3742.50, 3743.04, 3743.06, 3743.17, 3743.19, 3743.25, 3743.60, 3743.61, 3743.63, 3743.65, 3745.11, 3745.21, 3748.13, 3750.02, 3769.088, 3770.071, 3770.072, 3770.073, 3770.10, 3770.12, 3770.121, 3770.13, 3770.25, 3772.02, 3775.16, 3780.02, 3780.03, 3780.06, 3780.10, 3780.24, 3780.26, 3780.30, 3781.10, 3781.102, 3781.1011, 3901.90, 3902.70, 3905.426, 3905.72, 3923.443, 3951.03, 3959.01, 3959.111, 4112.055, 4117.08, 4117.10, 4141.01, 4141.02, 4141.162, 4141.23, 4141.281, 4141.29, 4141.33, 4141.56, 4141.60, 4301.12, 4301.19, 4301.30, 4301.421, 4303.181, 4303.183, 4303.204, 4303.2011, 4303.233, 4305.131, 4501.027, 4501.21, 4501.29, 4501.30, 4501.302, 4503.038, 4503.06, 4503.0610, 4503.0611, 4503.10, 4503.102, 4503.29, 4503.41, 4503.579, 4503.91, 4505.07, 4505.09, 4506.01, 4506.05, 4506.07, 4506.13, 4506.131, 4506.14, 4507.061, 4507.08, 4507.09, 4507.21, 4507.40, 4507.53, 4508.02, 4509.06, 4509.07, 4509.101, 4509.70, 4511.01, 4511.75, 4511.76, 4511.77, 4511.771, 4511.78, 4517.01, 4517.52, 4517.60, 4519.59, 4582.024, 4582.26, 4701.01, 4701.04, 4701.16, 4707.024, 4723.28, 4723.483, 4723.4811, 4725.48, 4729.01, 4729.49, 4729.52, 4729.53, 4729.54, 4729.541, 4729.56, 4729.561, 4729.60, 4729.80, 4729.901, 4729.902, 4729.921, 4730.25, 4730.433, 4730.437, 4730.99, 4731.22, 4731.2210, 4731.92, 4731.96, 4731.99, 4735.01, 4735.06, 4735.09, 4735.55, 4735.56, 4735.80, 4740.06, 4741.04, 4743.05, 4743.10, 4749.01, 4751.20, 4751.24, 4751.25, 4758.01, 4758.02, 4758.03, 4758.10, 4758.13, 4758.20, 4758.22, 4758.221, 4758.23, 4758.24, 4758.27, 4758.30, 4758.31, 4758.35, 4758.36, 4758.39, 4758.40, 4758.41, 4758.42, 4758.43, 4758.44, 4758.45, 4758.52, 4758.54, 4758.55, 4758.56, 4758.57, 4758.59, 4758.99, 4759.07, 4759.99, 4760.13, 4760.99, 4761.09, 4761.99, 4762.13, 4762.99, 4765.11, 4765.55, 4767.10, 4772.20, 4772.21, 4772.23, 4772.99, 4774.13, 4774.99, 4778.14, 4778.99, 4785.041, 4903.10, 4905.311, 4906.07, 4911.18, 4921.01, 4923.01, 4927.01, 4928.05, 4928.06, 4928.102, 4928.34, 4928.43, 4928.51, 4928.52, 4928.53, 4928.54, 4928.542, 4928.543, 4928.544, 4928.55, 4928.56, 4928.58, 4928.61, 4928.62, 4928.63, 4928.66, 4928.75, 4928.86, 4981.02, 5101.101, 5101.13, 5101.131, 5101.132, 5101.133, 5101.134, 5101.135, 5101.136, 5101.137, 5101.14, 5101.141, 5101.142, 5101.145, 5101.146, 5101.1410, 5101.1411, 5101.1412, 5101.1413, 5101.1414, 5101.1415, 5101.1416, 5101.1417, 5101.1418, 5101.19, 5101.191, 5101.192, 5101.193, 5101.194, 5101.211, 5101.212, 5101.215, 5101.222, 5101.242, 5101.26, 5101.272, 5101.273, 5101.28, 5101.30, 5101.33, 5101.342, 5101.35, 5101.351, 5101.38, 5101.461, 5101.542, 5101.80, 5101.801, 5101.802, 5101.805, 5101.85, 5101.853, 5101.854, 5101.856, 5101.88, 5101.885, 5101.886, 5101.887, 5101.8812, 5101.89, 5101.891, 5101.892, 5101.893, 5101.894, 5101.895, 5101.897, 5101.899, 5101.98, 5101.99, 5103.02, 5103.021, 5103.0329, 5103.15, 5103.155, 5103.18, 5103.30, 5103.32, 5103.41, 5104.01, 5104.12, 5104.29, 5104.30, 5104.32, 5104.34, 5104.36, 5104.37, 5104.38, 5104.41, 5104.50, 5104.99, 5117.07, 5117.12, 5119.01, 5119.011, 5119.04, 5119.05, 5119.051, 5119.06, 5119.07, 5119.08, 5119.091, 5119.10, 5119.11, 5119.14, 5119.141, 5119.15, 5119.161, 5119.17, 5119.18, 5119.181, 5119.182, 5119.184, 5119.185, 5119.186, 5119.187, 5119.188, 5119.19, 5119.20, 5119.201, 5119.21, 5119.22, 5119.221, 5119.23, 5119.24, 5119.25, 5119.27, 5119.28, 5119.29, 5119.30, 5119.31, 5119.311, 5119.32, 5119.33, 5119.331, 5119.332, 5119.333, 5119.334, 5119.34, 5119.342, 5119.343, 5119.35, 5119.36, 5119.362, 5119.363, 5119.364, 5119.365, 5119.366, 5119.367, 5119.368, 5119.37, 5119.371, 5119.38, 5119.39, 5119.391, 5119.392, 5119.393, 5119.394, 5119.395, 5119.397, 5119.40, 5119.41, 5119.42, 5119.421, 5119.43, 5119.431, 5119.44, 5119.45, 5119.46, 5119.47, 5119.48, 5119.49, 5119.50, 5119.51, 5119.52, 5119.54, 5119.55, 5119.56, 5119.60, 5119.61, 5119.71, 5119.82, 5119.85, 5119.89, 5119.90, 5119.99, 5120.034, 5120.035, 5120.16, 5120.173, 5120.21, 5120.51, 5121.30, 5121.32, 5121.33, 5121.34, 5121.41, 5121.43, 5122.01, 5122.03, 5122.10, 5122.15, 5122.20, 5122.21, 5122.23, 5122.26, 5122.27, 5122.31, 5122.32, 5122.33, 5122.341, 5122.36, 5122.44, 5122.45, 5122.46, 5122.47, 5123.081, 5123.16, 5123.168, 5123.169, 5123.191, 5123.41, 5123.42, 5123.47, 5124.15, 5139.05, 5139.08, 5139.12, 5139.14, 5139.34, 5145.162, 5153.10, 5153.122, 5153.16, 5153.163, 5160.37, 5162.13, 5162.132, 5162.133, 5162.134, 5162.136, 5162.1310, 5162.70, 5162.82, 5163.03, 5163.091, 5163.093, 5163.094, 5163.098, 5163.30, 5163.33, 5165.19, 5165.192, 5165.26, 5166.03, 5167.01, 5167.03, 5167.123, 5167.24, 5168.08, 5168.11, 5168.22, 5168.25, 5168.90, 5180.14, 5180.17, 5180.20, 5180.21, 5180.22, 5310.06, 5310.47, 5323.02, 5501.91, 5502.262, 5502.29, 5502.30, 5502.41, 5503.02, 5505.045, 5505.046, 5505.99, 5525.03, 5537.01, 5537.02, 5537.03, 5537.27, 5540.02, 5595.02, 5701.11, 5703.052, 5703.19, 5703.21, 5703.37, 5703.70, 5705.01, 5705.03, 5705.12, 5705.121, 5705.13, 5705.131, 5705.132, 5705.14, 5705.194, 5705.199, 5705.21, 5705.212, 5705.213, 5705.215, 5705.217, 5705.218, 5705.219, 5705.2111, 5705.2114, 5705.221, 5705.222, 5705.233, 5705.25, 5705.251, 5705.261, 5705.27, 5705.28, 5705.29, 5705.30, 5705.31, 5705.314, 5705.32, 5705.321, 5705.35, 5705.36, 5705.37, 5705.38, 5705.391, 5705.40, 5705.412, 5705.55, 5709.081, 5709.212, 5709.92, 5709.93, 5715.19, 5717.01, 5725.01, 5725.23, 5725.35, 5725.38, 5726.03, 5726.20, 5726.61, 5726.98, 5727.111, 5727.26, 5727.38, 5727.42, 5727.47, 5727.48, 5727.89, 5728.10, 5729.10, 5729.18, 5729.21, 5735.12, 5736.09, 5739.01, 5739.011, 5739.02, 5739.03, 5739.07, 5739.09, 5739.092, 5739.101, 5739.12, 5739.13, 5739.132, 5739.31, 5743.021, 5743.024, 5743.081, 5743.323, 5743.52, 5743.54, 5743.55, 5743.56, 5743.57, 5743.59, 5743.60, 5743.62, 5743.63, 5743.64, 5745.03, 5745.04, 5745.09, 5745.12, 5747.01, 5747.02, 5747.021, 5747.025, 5747.05, 5747.062, 5747.063, 5747.064, 5747.07, 5747.071, 5747.08, 5747.09, 5747.10, 5747.13, 5747.38, 5747.39, 5747.40, 5747.43, 5747.502, 5747.51, 5747.72, 5747.85, 5747.86, 5747.98, 5748.01, 5748.02, 5748.021, 5748.03, 5748.04, 5748.08, 5748.081, 5748.09, 5749.02, 5749.07, 5751.02, 5751.09, 5751.53, 5751.98, 5753.031, 5753.07, 5907.11, 5907.17, 5923.30, 6101.53, 6101.54, 6101.55, 6111.01, and 6111.04; to amend, for the purpose of adopting new section numbers as indicated in parentheses, sections 103.412 (103.411), 103.414 (103.412), 103.73 (109.39), 122.66 (5101.311), 122.67 (5101.312), 122.68 (5101.313), 122.681 (5101.314), 122.69 (5101.315), 122.70 (5101.316), 122.701 (5101.317), 122.702 (5101.318), 3517.152 (3517.14), 3517.153 (3517.15), 3517.154 (3517.16), 3517.155 (3517.17), 3517.157 (3517.18), 3517.992 (3517.99), 3517.993 (3517.171), 3701.65 (5180.72), 3738.01 (5180.27), 3738.02 (5180.271), 3738.03 (5180.272), 3738.04 (5180.273), 3738.05 (5180.274), 3738.06 (5180.275), 3738.07 (5180.276), 3738.08 (5180.277), 3738.09 (5180.278), 5101.13 (5180.40), 5101.131 (5180.401), 5101.132 (5180.402), 5101.133 (5180.403), 5101.134 (5180.404), 5101.135 (5180.405), 5101.136 (5180.406), 5101.137 (5180.407), 5101.14 (5180.41), 5101.141 (5180.42), 5101.142 (5180.421), 5101.144 (5180.411), 5101.145 (5180.422), 5101.146 (5180.423), 5101.147 (5180.424), 5101.148 (5180.425), 5101.149 (5180.426), 5101.1410 (5180.427), 5101.1411 (5180.428), 5101.1412 (5180.429), 5101.1413 (5180.4210), 5101.1414 (5180.4211), 5101.1415 (5180.4212), 5101.1416 (5180.4213), 5101.1417 (5180.4214), 5101.1418 (5180.43), 5101.15 (5180.44), 5101.19 (5180.45), 5101.191 (5180.451), 5101.192 (5180.452), 5101.193 (5180.453), 5101.194 (5180.454), 5101.34 (5180.70), 5101.341 (5180.701), 5101.342 (5180.702), 5101.343 (5180.703), 5101.76 (5180.26), 5101.77 (5180.261), 5101.78 (5180.262), 5101.802 (5180.52), 5101.804 (5180.71), 5101.805 (5180.704), 5101.85 (5180.50), 5101.851 (5180.51), 5101.853 (5180.511), 5101.854 (5180.512), 5101.855 (5180.513), 5101.856 (5180.514), 5101.88 (5180.53), 5101.881 (5180.531), 5101.884 (5180.532), 5101.885 (5180.533), 5101.886 (5180.534), 5101.887 (5180.535), 5101.889 (5180.57), 5101.8811 (5180.536), 5101.8812 (5180.56), 5104.50 (5180.04), and 5180.40 (5180.73); to enact new sections 103.41, 107.034, 3313.902, 3313.905, 3314.38, 3321.191, 3333.0415, 3345.86, 3517.991, and 3780.22 and sections 5.62, 9.05, 9.561, 9.64, 9.691, 106.025, 106.026, 106.033, 111.29, 118.29, 121.16, 122.1712, 122.1713, 122.636, 122.97, 122.98, 122.981, 123.14, 123.282, 123.283, 123.30, 124.184, 125.052, 126.024, 126.10, 126.17, 126.67, 131.026, 135.1411, 148.021, 173.503, 319.304, 731.291, 924.212, 943.27, 1310.251, 1349.10, 1349.101, 1501.022, 1501.023, 1501.46, 1501.47, 1509.075, 1513.371, 1546.25, 1546.26, 1713.032, 1713.033, 1713.041, 3301.24, 3301.82, 3310.037, 3310.21, 3310.22, 3310.23, 3310.24, 3310.25, 3310.26, 3310.412, 3310.413, 3310.523, 3311.242, 3313.536, 3313.6031, 3313.6032, 3313.7118, 3314.093, 3314.362, 3315.063, 3317.165, 3317.27, 3317.28, 3317.29, 3317.31, 3319.173, 3319.2310, 3321.043, 3332.17, 3332.21, 3332.22, 3333.0420, 3333.053, 3333.074, 3333.1210, 3333.952, 3333.96, 3333.97, 3345.457, 3345.58, 3345.601, 3345.721, 3345.83, 3345.89, 3375.47, 3501.055, 3701.88, 3704.0310, 3707.61, 3721.074, 3722.15, 3727.46, 3743.48, 3770.074, 3770.075, 3780.37, 3901.047, 3901.3815, 3902.631, 3959.121, 4113.31, 4141.011, 4141.08, 4517.521, 4561.03, 4582.72, 4582.73, 4729.261, 4731.256, 4741.041, 4927.22, 4928.545, 5101.042, 5101.543, 5101.548, 5101.549, 5101.612, 5101.95, 5103.039, 5103.0520, 5103.09, 5104.302, 5104.53, 5104.54, 5104.60, 5119.211, 5119.344, 5119.345, 5123.1613, 5123.423, 5126.222, 5145.32, 5162.08, 5162.14, 5162.25, 5162.251, 5163.04, 5163.104, 5163.11, 5163.50, 5164.093, 5166.50, 5167.09, 5180.705, 5180.706, 5180.707, 5180.99, 5303.34, 5703.83, 5705.17, 5705.316, 5705.60, 5709.89, 5726.62, 5743.511, 5743.521, 5743.621, 5743.631, 5747.073, 5747.124, and 5747.87; and to repeal sections 9.47, 101.38, 103.053, 103.054, 103.24, 103.41, 103.411, 103.413, 103.415, 103.60, 103.71, 103.72, 103.74, 103.75, 103.76, 103.77, 103.78, 103.79, 107.034, 113.06, 113.78, 117.113, 117.251, 117.441, 117.51, 122.451, 122.55, 122.56, 122.561, 122.57, 122.852, 125.181, 125.36, 125.38, 125.43, 125.49, 125.51, 125.56, 125.65, 125.76, 125.95, 128.412, 135.144, 501.03, 904.06, 905.56, 935.25, 956.181, 1561.18, 1561.21, 1561.22, 2919.1910, 3313.902, 3313.905, 3314.38, 3314.50, 3317.0218, 3317.036, 3317.071, 3317.23, 3317.231, 3317.24, 3321.191, 3333.0415, 3333.303, 3333.373, 3333.801, 3345.86, 3354.24, 3379.10, 3513.254, 3513.255, 3513.256, 3513.259, 3517.14, 3517.151, 3517.156, 3517.99, 3517.991, 3701.0212, 3701.051, 3780.18, 3780.19, 3780.22, 3780.23, 4115.31, 4115.32, 4115.33, 4115.34, 4115.35, 4115.36, 4729.551, 4758.18, 4758.241, 4758.50, 4928.57, 4928.581, 4928.582, 4928.583, 5104.08, 5123.352, 5160.23, 5163.05, 5165.261, 5166.45, 5180.23, 5180.24, 5180.34, 5310.05, 5310.06, 5310.07, 5310.08, 5310.09, 5310.10, 5310.11, 5310.12, 5310.13, 5310.14, 5537.24, 5705.192, 5705.195, 5705.196, 5705.197, 5726.59, 5739.071, 5747.29, 5747.67, 5747.75, 5751.55, 5902.06, and 5902.20 of the Revised Code and to amend Section 755.60 of H.B. 54 of the 136th General Assembly, Sections 200.30 as subsequently amended, 207.37, 221.15 as subsequently amended, 243.10 as subsequently amended, 363.10, 371.20 as subsequently amended, and 373.15 as subsequently amended of H.B. 2 of the 135th General Assembly, Section 265.550 of H.B. 33 of the 135th General Assembly as subsequently amended, Section 14 of H.B. 238 of the 135th General Assembly, Section 270.14 of H.B. 45 of the 134th General Assembly as subsequently amended, and Section 5 of H.B. 554 of the 134th General Assembly as subsequently amended; to amend Section 733.61 of H.B. 166 of the 133rd General Assembly as subsequently amended to codify it as section 3313.6033 of the Revised Code; and to repeal Sections 335.20 and 757.60 of H.B. 33 of the 135th General Assembly, Section 6 of H.B. 150 of the 134th General Assembly, Section 5 of S.B. 202 of the 134th General Assembly, and Sections 125.10 as subsequently amended and 125.11 as subsequently amended of H.B. 59 of the 130th General Assembly to make operating appropriations for the biennium beginning July 1, 2025, and ending June 30, 2027, to levy taxes, and to provide authorization and conditions for the operation of state programs.
- Territorial extent: Ohio
- Passed by: Ohio House of Representatives
- Passed: April 9, 2025
- Passed by: Ohio Senate
- Passed: June 11, 2025
- Signed by: Mike DeWine
- Signed: June 30, 2025
- Effective: September 30, 2025*
- Introduced: February 11, 2025

Final stages
- Finally passed both chambers: June 30, 2025
- Reconsidered by the Ohio House of Representatives after veto: July 21, 2025
- Status: In force

Ohio House Bill 96 (H.B. 96) is a 2025 law in the state of Ohio that renews the state operating budget through FY 2027, along with other provisions. It was signed into law by Governor Mike DeWine on June 30, 2025 and took effect on September 30, 2025.

The bill gained attention due to the merger of House Bill 84, also known as the Innocence Act, which requires websites that provide adult content to verify users' age using ID or other means. Similar laws in other states such as Texas have been permitted by the Supreme Court of the United States, most recently in Free Speech Coalition v. Paxton. Aylo, which manages the pornography site Pornhub, has restricted access to states which have passed similar laws in the past.

== Provisions ==
House Bill 84, which was merged into House Bill 96, requires adult online services and websites to verify that people in Ohio using their services are at least 18 years old. It allows the use of a state ID, personal information which would be scanned through online databases, or facial recognition to determine age. Any information given to said services have to be deleted immediately after verification, unless the user is actively subscribed to a service. Services that do not comply with the provisions can face lawsuits by the Ohio Attorney General. Social media sites, cable providers and news providers are exempt from the law.

Separately, the bill increases funding for state libraries by $10,000,000 through fiscal year 2027. The bill also affects transgender people by banning public facilities from placing menstrual products in men's restrooms, including tampons.
