= Reno v. American Civil Liberties Union =

- Supreme Court of the United States

Argued March 19, 1997 Decided June 26, 1997
- Full case name: Janet Reno, Attorney General of the United States, et al. v. American Civil Liberties Union, et al.
- Docket no.: 96-511
- Citations: 521 U.S. 844 (more) 117 S. Ct. 2329; 138 L. Ed. 2d 874; 1997 U.S. LEXIS 4037

Case history
- Prior: Prelim. injunction granted (3-judge court, E.D. Pa. 1996); expedited review by S.Ct. per CDA §561

Holding
- Speech on the Internet is entitled to full First Amendment protection; enforcing the criminal penalties of the Communications Decency Act is unconstitutuonal due to overbreadth.

Court membership
- Chief Justice William Rehnquist Associate Justices John P. Stevens · Sandra Day O'Connor; Antonin Scalia · Anthony Kennedy; David Souter · Clarence Thomas; Ruth Bader Ginsburg · Stephen Breyer

Case opinions
- Majority: Stevens, joined by Scalia, Kennedy, Souter, Thomas, Ginsburg, Breyer
- Concur/dissent: O'Connor, joined by Rehnquist

Laws applied
- U.S. Const. amend. I; 47 U.S.C. § 223

Reno v. American Civil Liberties Union, 521 U.S. 844 (1997), is a landmark decision of the Supreme Court of the United States, unanimously ruling that indecency provisions of the 1996 Communications Decency Act violated the First Amendment's guarantee of freedom of speech. This was the first major Supreme Court ruling on the regulation of materials distributed via the Internet.

== Background and procedural history ==
The Communications Decency Act (CDA) was an attempt to protect minors from explicit material on the Internet by criminalizing the knowing transmission of "obscene or indecent" messages to any recipient under 18; and also knowingly sending to a person under 18 anything "that, in context, depicts or describes, in terms patently offensive as measured by contemporary community standards, sexual or excretory activities or organs." The American Civil Liberties Union argued that certain parts of the act were facially unconstitutional and sought a preliminary injunction preventing the government from enforcing those provisions.

Section 561 of the act required that any facial challenges be heard by a panel of three district judges; that panel granted the injunction. Because the act also permitted appeals to be heard directly by the Supreme Court, that court took the case without the usual intermediate appellate decision. The government's main defense of the CDA was that the Supreme Court had upheld similar decency laws in three prior decisions: Ginsberg v. New York (1968); F.C.C. v. Pacifica Foundation (1978); and Renton v. Playtime Theatres, Inc. (1986).

In Ginsberg v. New York, the Supreme Court ruled that material that is not obscene may nonetheless be harmful for children, and its marketing may be regulated. In F.C.C. v. Pacifica Foundation, the Supreme Court upheld the possibility of the FCC delivering administrative sanctions to a radio station for broadcasting George Carlin's "Seven Dirty Words" comedy routine.

In Reno v. ACLU, though, the Supreme Court held that this case law did not support the provisions of the CDA. The Court reasoned that the FCC's sanctions under the Pacifica precedent were not criminal punishments, and TV and radio broadcasts "as a matter of history, had 'received the most limited First Amendment protection' ... in large part because warnings could not adequately protect the listener from unexpected program content." Conversely, Internet users must take "a series of affirmative steps" to access explicit material.

Finally, in Renton v. Playtime Theatres, Inc., the Supreme Court upheld a zoning ordinance that kept adult movie theaters out of residential neighborhoods. The government argued that the CDA was an attempt to institute "a sort of 'cyberzoning' on the Internet". In Reno v. ACLU, however, the Court ruled that the "time, place, and manner regulation" that Renton had enacted did not correspond with the CDA, which was "a content-based blanket restriction on speech".

== Opinion of the Court ==
In a nuanced decision, Justice John Paul Stevens wrote of the differences between Internet communication and previous types of communication that the Court had ruled on. In conclusion, he wrote:

We are persuaded that the CDA lacks the precision that the First Amendment requires when a statute regulates the content of speech. In order to deny minors access to potentially harmful speech, the CDA effectively suppresses a large amount of speech that adults have a constitutional right to receive and to address to one another. That burden on adult speech is unacceptable if less restrictive alternatives would be at least as effective in achieving the legitimate purpose that the statute was enacted to serve. [...] It is true that we have repeatedly recognized the governmental interest in protecting children from harmful materials. But that interest does not justify an unnecessarily broad suppression of speech addressed to adults. As we have explained, the Government may not "reduc[e] the adult population... to... only what is fit for children."

The practical result of the ruling is that the Internet is entitled to the full free speech protection that is given to other forms of media like the printed press or television, and the special factors that justify governmental regulations of media broadcasts do not apply. Except for child pornography or obscenity, the Communications Decency Act of 1996 was struck down as unenforceable when applied to its anti-decency measures, since such provisions are overbroad. Enforcement of the statute would be a violation of the Free Speech Clause of the First Amendment.

The rest of the CDA, including the "safe harbor" provision in Section 230 protecting Internet service providers from being liable for the words of others, was not affected by this decision and remains law.

=== Concurring opinion ===
Justice O'Connor, joined by Chief Justice Rehnquist, agreed with the decision "as of 1997" but expressed interest in the idea of creating an "adult zone" on the Internet that was made inaccessible to minors through "gateway technology" that had been investigated by a lower district court. If such technology could be introduced, they wrote, zoning portions of the Internet to prohibit adult content could be as constitutional as such zoning is in the physical world. The two dissented in part, writing they would have invalidated a narrower portion of the two CDA provisions under review.

== See also ==
- Chris Hansen, ACLU litigator who organized the case
- Communications Decency Act, the 1996 Act invalidated by Reno v. ACLU
- Child Online Protection Act, successor legislation, also invalidated
- Children's Internet Protection Act, successor legislation, ultimately upheld
- Ashcroft v. American Civil Liberties Union (2002, 2004)
- Free Speech Coalition v. Paxton (2025)
