= Medina v. Planned Parenthood South Atlantic =

- Supreme Court of the United States

Argued April 02, 2025 Decided June 26, 2025
- Full case name: Medina v. Planned Parenthood South Atlantic
- Docket no.: 23-1275
- Citations: 606 U.S. 357 (more)
- Argument: Oral argument
- Opinion announcement: Opinion announcement

Case history
- Prior: Kerr v. Planned Parenthood South Atlantic, 599 U.S. __ (2023).

Holding
- Section 1396a(a)(23)(A) of the Medicaid Act does not clearly and unambiguously confer individual rights enforceable under 42 U.S.C. § 1983.

Court membership
- Chief Justice John Roberts Associate Justices Clarence Thomas · Samuel Alito; Sonia Sotomayor · Elena Kagan; Neil Gorsuch · Brett Kavanaugh; Amy Coney Barrett · Ketanji Brown Jackson

Case opinions
- Majority: Gorsuch, joined by Roberts, Thomas, Alito, Kavanaugh, Barrett
- Concurrence: Thomas
- Dissent: Jackson, joined by Sotomayor, Kagan

Laws applied
- The Medicaid Act, 42 U.S.C. §§ 1396a and 1983

Medina v. Planned Parenthood South Atlantic, 606 U.S. 357 (2025), (Note: The case was previously known as Kerr v. Planned Parenthood South Atlantic. It became Medina v. Planned Parenthood South Atlantic following the replacement of Robert Kerr, the director of South Carolina Department of Health and Human Services) is a United States Supreme Court case in which the Court held that the Medicaid Act does not give individuals an enforceable right to choose a specific healthcare provider.

== Background ==
The federal Medicaid program, established in 1965, provides medical care, in collaboration with the states, to low-income individuals. Federal funding for Medicaid cannot generally be used for abortions. In 2018, South Carolina Governor Henry McMaster issued Executive Order 2018-21, which ordered South Carolina Department of Health and Human Services to deem abortion clinics "unqualified" to provide family planning services under Medicaid. Julie Edwards, one of the patients receiving non-abortion gynecological care from Planned Parenthood South Atlantic, joined by Planned Parenthood, sued Robert Kerr, the director of South Carolina Department of Health and Human Services, arguing that federal civil rights law allowed them to sue the state for violating a provision of the Medicaid act that allows Medicaid patients to get care from any "qualified" provider of their choice.

The district court entered a permanent injunction preventing South Carolina from excluding Planned Parenthood from its Medicaid program. On appeal, the U.S. Court of Appeals for the Fourth Circuit affirmed the district court's decision and held that the Medicaid Act creates individual rights that can be enforced under federal civil rights law.

The Supreme Court vacated the Fourth Circuit's decision and remanded for further proceedings. The Fourth Circuit reaffirmed the district court's decision.

== Opinion of the Court ==
The Supreme Court heard oral arguments on April 2, 2025.

The Supreme Court ruled, in 6-3 decision reversing the lower court's decision, that Medicaid beneficiaries may not sue state officials for failure to comply with one of the funding conditions in Title 42.

Justice Neil Gorsuch, wrote the majority opinion, which says "Congress knows how to give a grantee clear and unambiguous notice that, if it accepts federal funds, it may face private suits asserting an individual right to choose a medical provider."

Under Gonzaga University v. Doe and Health and Hospital Corporation of Marion County v. Talevski, private parties can only sue for violations of federal spending power statutes in "atypical situations" when the provision unambigously confers an individual right enforceable under Section 1983. While the Medicaid Act's "any-qualified provider" rule provides that Medicaid patients can choose any eligible provider, the Court ruled this does not clearly and unambiguously grant individuals the right to sue, so private lawsuits cannot be brought under this provision.

Justice Thomas filed a concurring opinion, writing separately to reiterate his dissent in Talevski where he emphasized the difference between rights and benefits.

Justice Ketanji Brown Jackson wrote the dissenting opinion arguing that the Medicaid provision met the test for a Section 1983 cause of action. She criticized the court for weakening "landmark civil rights protections".

== See also ==
- Health & Hospital Corp. of Marion County v. Talevski
