= Hewitt v. United States =

Hewitt v. United States Duffey v. United States
- Supreme Court of the United States

Argued January 13, 2025 Decided June 26, 2025
- Full case name: Tony R. Hewitt, Petitioner v. United States
- Docket nos.: 23-1002; 23-1150
- Citations: 606 U.S. 419 (more)
- Argument: Oral argument
- Decision: Opinion

Case history
- Prior: Judgment of conviction and sentences entered. United States v. Hewitt, No. 08-cr-167 (N.D. Tex. 2010).; Affirmed in part, vacated in part, and remanded for resentencing sub nom United States v. Duffey, 456 F. App’x 434 (5th Cir. 2012).; Cert. denied. ___ U.S. ___ (2012).; Resentencing. United States v. Hewitt, No. 08-cr-167 (N.D. Tex. 2012).; Affirmed sub nom United States v. Ross, 582 F. App’x 528 (5th Cir. 2014).; Section 2255 motion denied. Hewitt v. United States, No. 16-cv-603 (N.D. Tex. 2018).; Leave to file successive § 2255 motion granted. In re Hewitt, No. 20-10501 (5th Cir. 2021).; Resentencing. United States v. Hewitt, No. 08-cr-167 (N.D. Tex. 2022).; Affirmed sub nom United States v. Duffey, 92 F.4th 304 (5th Cir. 2024).; Cert. granted. 603 U.S. ___ (2024).

Questions presented
- Whether the First Step Act's sentencing reduction provisions apply to a defendant originally sentenced before the FSA's enactment when that original sentence is judicially vacated and the defendant is resentenced to a new term of imprisonment after the FSA's enactment.

Holding
- The judgment is reversed, and the cases are remanded.

Court membership
- Chief Justice John Roberts Associate Justices Clarence Thomas · Samuel Alito; Sonia Sotomayor · Elena Kagan; Neil Gorsuch · Brett Kavanaugh; Amy Coney Barrett · Ketanji Brown Jackson

Case opinions
- Majority: Jackson (Parts I-III), joined by Roberts, Sotomayor, Kagan, Gorsuch
- Plurality: Jackson (Parts IV, V), joined by Sotomayor, Kagan
- Dissent: Alito, joined by Thomas, Kavanaugh, Barrett

Hewitt v. United States (consolidated with Duffey v. United States), 606 U.S. 419 (2025), was a United States Supreme Court case in which the court held that all first-time 18 U.S.C. § 924(c) offenders who appear for sentencing after the First Step Act's enactment date, including those whose previous § 924(c) sentences have been vacated and who thus need to be resentenced, are subject to the Act's revised penalties.

== Background ==
=== Legal background ===
Federal law makes it a crime to use a firearm in the commission of a "crime of violence" or "drug trafficking crime". Prior to its amendment in 2018, 18 U.S.C. § 924(c)(1) provided that:

(A) [A]ny person who, during and in relation to any crime of violence or drug trafficking crime ... for which the person may be prosecuted in a court of the United States, uses or carries a firearm ... shall, in addition to the punishment provided for such crime of violence or drug trafficking crime—

(i) be sentenced to a term of imprisonment of not less than 5 years;
(ii) if the firearm is brandished, be sentenced to a term of imprisonment of not less than 7 years; and
(iii) if the firearm is discharged, be sentenced to a term of imprisonment of not less than 10 years.

...

(C) In the case of a second or subsequent conviction under this subsection, the person shall—

(i) be sentenced to a term of imprisonment of not less than 25 years[.]

...

(D) Notwithstanding any other provision of law—

(i) a court shall not place on probation any person convicted of a violation of this subsection; and
(ii) no term of imprisonment imposed on a person under this subsection shall run concurrently with any other term of imprisonment imposed on the person, including any term of imprisonment imposed for the crime of violence or drug trafficking crime during which the firearm was used, carried, or possessed.

— 18 U.S.C. § 924(c) (2017 ed.) (emphasis added).

In Deal v. United States, the Supreme Court held that a first-time offender could accrue multiple convictions and trigger penalties "[i]n the case of his second or subsequent conviction" under § 924(c).

On December 21, 2018, President Donald Trump signed into law the First Step Act, a bipartisan criminal justice bill. Section 403 of the First Step Act was enacted to overrule Deal v. United States, and prospectively eliminate § 924(c)'s "stacking" effect as to first-time offenders:

SEC. 403. CLARIFICATION OF SECTION 924(c) OF TITLE 18, UNITED STATES CODE.

(a) IN GENERAL.—Section 924(c)(1)(C) of title 18, United States Code, is amended, in the matter preceding clause (i), by striking ‘‘second or subsequent conviction under this subsection’’ and inserting ‘‘violation of this subsection that occurs after a prior conviction under this subsection has become final’’.
(b) APPLICABILITY TO PENDING CASES.—This section, and the amendments made by this section, shall apply to any offense that was committed before the date of enactment of this Act, if a sentence for the offense has not been imposed as of such date of enactment.

— Pub. L. 115-391, 132 Stat. 5194, 5221-5222, December 21, 2018 (emphasis added).

=== Factual background ===
Throughout the first half of 2008, Tony R. Hewitt, Corey D. Duffey, Jarvis D. Ross, and their associates robbed several banks in the Dallas-Fort Worth area. As part of the enterprise, Hewitt and Duffey assumed leadership roles over their confederates.

On January 28, 2008, Hewitt, Duffey, Ross, and four others robbed a Citi Bank in Garland. Prior to the robbery, the group had stolen a white sedan for transportation. Hewitt organized the robbery and communicated to the others via a walkie talkie. Due to the large size of the branch and its many patrons, and despite their armed presence, the robbers came away with only $5,000.

On February 1, Hewitt, Duffey, and six others robbed a Comerica Bank in DeSoto with the use of firearms. Prior to this robbery, the group had stolen a Ford Explorer for transportation. This robbery netted the group $245,000.

On March 28, Hewitt, Duffey, Ross, and five others robbed a Century Bank in Dallas. Prior to the robbery, the group had stolen a Chevrolet Suburban for transportation. Bank surveillance cameras captured the robbers, armed with handguns and a taser. As the robbers fled, a dye pack that had been hidden among the money exploded, tarnishing nearly all the money from the heist. The crew later ditched their tainted money and getaway car in a nearby apartment complex. Hewitt later told a fellow bank robber that the Century Bank robbery had been unsuccessful on account of the money bag breaking. Later that same day, Hewitt, Duffey, Ross, and three others (still stained with dye from the earlier robbery) robbed a Texas State Bank branch in Garland. Prior to this robbery, a member of the group had stolen another Suburban to use as transportation. The robbers walked away with $14,700.

On April 24, Hewitt, Duffey, Ross, and four others robbed a Bank of America branch in Irving, using the same Suburban as in the March 28 robbery in Garland. Once inside the bank, the bank robbers deployed tasers to incapacitate bank tellers. The group walked away with $84,000.

On May 15, agents of the Federal Bureau of Investigation (FBI) observed Hewitt and an associate apparently casing a Bank of America branch in Fort Worth. The following day, agents observed Hewitt and two others in the same area. The robbers, again armed with guns, drove to the branch and waited for Duffey to give a signal, but no signal came. Duffey instead immediately cancelled the robbery. On May 21, FBI agents observed Duffey, Ross, and an associate simultaneously casing two Bank of America branches in Richardson. Upon execution of an emergency wiretap, agents learned of an imminent bank robbery. However, suspecting that the FBI had caught on to their plan, the robbers abandoned the robbery. Through subsequent telephone interceptions, FBI agents learned of a planned robbery on a Regions Bank branch in Garland that was scheduled for June 2. On June 1, Duffey again stole a Chevrolet Suburban and parked at the Regions Bank with Ross. The two met with Hewitt and another associate, as two other robbers were parking near the branch. FBI agents moved in and arrested two robbers without incident. Hewitt, Duffey, Ross, and two others fled. After a violent chase, the remaining five were taken into custody.

== Lower court history ==
=== 2008-2019 ===
For their crimes, the group was indicted in the United States District Court for the Northern District of Texas on June 3, 2008, with a 43-count superseding indictment following on November 19. The superseding indictment variously charged Hewitt, Duffey, Ross, and their co-defendants with bank robbery, aiding and abetting bank robbery, attempted bank robbery, conspiracy to commit bank robbery, and using firearms during and in relation to the bank robberies in violation of 18 U.S.C. § 924(c). After they were convicted, and under the understanding of § 924(c) announced in Deal, the district court sentenced Hewitt to 4,260 months (355 years) imprisonment, Duffey to 4,253 months (354 years, 5 months) imprisonment, and Ross to 3,960 months (330 years) imprisonment. Defendants appealed, and the United States Court of Appeals for the Fifth Circuit affirmed in large part, vacated in part, and remanded for resentencing as to some counts. At resentencing, the district court resentenced Hewitt to 3,660 months (305 years) imprisonment, and Ross to 3,425 months (285 years, 5 months) imprisonment. The three later filed unsuccessful motions to vacate, set aside, or correct their sentences under 28 U.S.C. § 2255.

=== 2020-2024 ===
In 2019, the Supreme Court decided United States v. Davis. Davis held that conspiracy-predicated § 924(c) convictions do not count as "crimes of violence". Hewitt, Duffey, and Ross sought leave file a successive § 2255 petition, which the Fifth Circuit granted. Back in the trial court, three filed their successive § 2255 petitions. The district court granted relief. In doing so, it vacated the trio's relevant § 924(c) convictions, along with the sentences for all other convictions. At resentencing, the trio (along with the government) argued that they were entitled to retroactive relief provided by the more lenient § 924(c) sentencing provisions of the First Step Act, since none of their since-vacated prior sentences counted as sentence that "has ... been imposed" under Section 403(b) of the First Step Act. The Fifth Circuit disagreed and affirmed their sentences. In so holding, the Fifth Circuit maintained that § 403(b) applied only “to defendants for whom ‘a sentence . . . ha[d] not been imposed’ as of the enactment date” of the First Step Act.

Courts of appeals had split on how to understand the relevant language in § 403(b) of the First Step Act. In United States v. Merrell, the Ninth Circuit held that pre-Act offenders whose sentences were later vacated could be resentenced under § 403(b). The Third Circuit held the same in United States v. Mitchell. On the contrary, in United States v. Jackson, the United States Court of Appeals for the Sixth Circuit held that such defendants may not benefit from the First Step Act at resentencing if the prior sentence was vacated after the Act's enactment. Further still, in United States v. Uriarte, the Seventh Circuit held that such offenders may be resentenced under § 403(b) if their prior sentences were vacated before the Act's enactment, but simultaneously reserved judgment on whether such rule would apply to defendants whose sentences were vacated post-enactment.

== Supreme Court ==
On March 8, 2024, Hewitt petitioned the Supreme Court for a writ of certiorari. Duffey and Ross did the same on April 19. On July 2, the court granted review in both cases and consolidated the two. In the Supreme Court, as in the Fifth Circuit, the government agreed with petitioners on their reading of § 403(b). Thus, the Supreme Court appointed Michael H. McGinley to brief and argue the case in defense of the Fifth Circuit's judgment. Oral arguments were heard on January 13, 2025. Michael B. Kimberly argued the case for Hewitt, Duffey, and Ross. Masha G. Hansford argued the case for the government. McGinley argued the case as amicus curiae in defense of the Fifth Circuit's judgment. The Court issued its opinions on June 26.

Justice Jackson authored a majority opinion in which Chief Justice Roberts and Justices Sotomayor, Kagan, and Gorsuch joined, and a plurality opinion in which Justices Sotomayor and Kagan joined. The majority opinion held that under §403(b) of the First Step Act, a sentence “has . . . been imposed” for purposes of that provision if, and only if, the sentence is extant—that is, has not been vacated.

Justice Alito authored a dissenting opinion in which Justices Thomas, Kavanaugh, and Barrett joined. The dissenting opinion concluded that the majority's opinion undermined § 403(b)'s general anti-retroactivity provision, as it would allow for "any defendant whose sentence is vacated at any time and for any reason" to be resentenced under § 403(b).
