= Ashcroft v. American Civil Liberties Union =

- Supreme Court of the United States

Argued November 28, 2001 Decided May 13, 2002
- Full case name: John Ashcroft, Attorney General v. American Civil Liberties Union, et al.
- Citations: 535 U.S. 564 (more) 122 S. Ct. 1700; 152 L. Ed. 2d 771; 70 U.S.L.W. 4381; 30 Media L. Rep. 1801; 2002 Cal. Daily Op. Service 4057; 2002 Daily Journal DAR 5183; 15 Fla. L. Weekly Fed. S 256
- Argument: Oral argument

Case history
- Prior: American Civil Liberties Union v. Reno, 31 F. Supp. 2d 473 (E.D. Pa. 1999); affirmed, 217 F.3d 162 (3d Cir. 2000); cert. granted, 532 U.S. 1037 (2001).
- Subsequent: On remand, American Civil Liberties Union v. Ashcroft, 322 F.3d 240 (3d Cir. 2003); affirmed, 542 U.S. 656 (2004).

Holding
- The Child Online Protection Act's reliance on community standards to identify what material "is harmful to minors" may make the statute unconstitutional, but community standards need further definition.

Court membership
- Chief Justice William Rehnquist Associate Justices John P. Stevens · Sandra Day O'Connor; Antonin Scalia · Anthony Kennedy; David Souter · Clarence Thomas; Ruth Bader Ginsburg · Stephen Breyer

Case opinions
- Majority: Thomas (Parts I, II, IV), joined by Rehnquist, O’Connor, Scalia, Breyer
- Plurality: Thomas (Parts III-B), joined by Rehnquist, O’Connor, Scalia
- Plurality: Thomas (Parts III-A, III-C, III-D), joined by Rehnquist, Scalia
- Concurrence: O'Connor (in part and in judgment)
- Concurrence: Breyer (in part and in judgment)
- Concurrence: Kennedy (in judgment), joined by Souter, Ginsburg
- Dissent: Stevens

Laws applied
- Child Online Protection Act; U.S. Const. amend. I

Ashcroft v. American Civil Liberties Union, 535 U.S. 564 (2002), followed by 542 U.S. 656 (2004), is a decision of the United States Supreme Court, ruling that the Child Online Protection Act (COPA) was unconstitutional as a violation of the First Amendment's guarantee of freedom of speech.

== Background ==
In 1996 Congress passed the Communications Decency Act (CDA). The CDA prohibited the use of the Internet to purposely send indecent material to users under 18 years of age. In 1997 the Supreme Court unanimously struck down the anti-indecency provisions of the CDA in Reno v. American Civil Liberties Union, because in the CDA lacked the precision necessary for any regulation of speech. Congress attempted to address the issue of Internet pornography with a new and more specific statute the following year.

=== Child Online Protection Act ===
The Child Online Protection Act (COPA), passed in 1998, was Congress's second attempt to criminalize the use of the Internet to distribute obscene material, including pornography, simulated pornography, and pornographic artwork. COPA enforced a $50,000 fine and six months in prison for the posting for "commercial purposes" of content on the internet that is "harmful to minors".

COPA attempted to be more specific than the anti-obsencity provisions of its predecessor statute, and made it illegal for any commercial sources to allow obscene content that could cause particular harms to children. The new statute's language drew on the landmark Miller v. California ruling at the Supreme Court in 1973, in which that court formulated a more precise definition of "obscenity." Drawing on that definition, COPA defined material that is "harmful to minors" as:

any communication, picture, image, graphic image file, article, recording, writing, or other matter of any kind that is obscene or that—

(A) the average person, applying contemporary community standards, would find, taking the material as a whole and with respect to minors, is designed to appeal to, or is designed to pander to, the prurient interest;
(B) depicts, describes, or represents, in a manner patently offensive with respect to minors, an actual or simulated sexual act or sexual contact, an actual or simulated normal or perverted sexual act, or a lewd exhibition of the genitals or post-pubescent female breast; and
(C) taken as a whole, lacks serious literary, artistic, political, or scientific value for minors."

Thus, COPA was narrower and more precise than the CDA because it attempted to make use of the Miller Test to find "obscene" internet material that could be regulated.

== Lower court rulings ==
Opponents of COPA argued that child pornography was already illegal in any medium, and COPA would not be effective because it would waste too much time going after individual sites within the US that could simply set up shop overseas if shut down. It was also argued that COPA would infringe upon the rights of adults to receive legal (but perhaps inappropriate for children) content voluntarily, and that COPA was not the least pervasive or most efficient way to protect children from inappropriate online content.

In 1999, Judge Lowell A. Reed Jr. of the Eastern District of Pennsylvania granted a preliminary injunction blocking enforcement of COPA. This ruling was appealed to the U.S. Court of Appeals for the Third Circuit. In 2000, the circuit court upheld the preliminary injunction against COPA because it was impossible to apply "contemporary community standards" to the Internet. This decision was appealed to the Supreme Court, which granted certiorari.

== First opinion of the Supreme Court ==
In May 2002, the Supreme Court, in an 8–1 decision, affirmed the injunction against enforcement of COPA enacted by the circuit court, but ultimately ruled that the statute could not be invalidated because of its vague and overbroad definition of "contemporary community standards" in the Miller Test for obscenity that had already been affirmed by precedent. Furthermore, the circuit court should not have held that defining that term was impossible. Thus, the majority voted to remand the case back to the circuit court to discuss that matter further.

=== Dissenting opinion ===
The only dissenting opinion came from Justice John Paul Stevens, who argued that the court should have declared COPA to be unconstitutional without remanding to the circuit court for further discussion.

== Second opinion of the Supreme Court ==
Ashcroft v. American Civil Liberties Union
- Supreme Court of the United States

Argued March 2, 2004 Decided June 29, 2004
- Full case name: John Ashcroft, Attorney General v. American Civil Liberties Union, et al.
- Citations: 542 U.S. 656 (more) 124 S. Ct. 2783, 159 L. Ed. 2d 690

Holding
- The Child Online Protection Act was too restrictive in its attempts to regulate harmful material on the Internet, and this violates the First Amendment.

Court membership
- Chief Justice William Rehnquist Associate Justices John P. Stevens · Sandra Day O'Connor; Antonin Scalia · Anthony Kennedy; David Souter · Clarence Thomas; Ruth Bader Ginsburg · Stephen Breyer

Case opinions
- Majority: Kennedy, joined by Stevens, Souter, Thomas, Ginsburg
- Concurrence: Stevens, joined by Ginsburg
- Dissent: Scalia
- Dissent: Breyer, joined by Rehnquist, O’Connor

Laws applied
- Child Online Protection Act; U.S. Const. amend. I

In October 2002, the Third Circuit heard the case a second time, after the remand from the Supreme Court. In March 2003, the Third Circuit again upheld the injunction against COPA, this time with a more precise discussion of "contemporary community standards". The government appealed that decision and the Supreme Court granted certiorari again, and in June 2004 the Court reaffirmed the original preliminary injunction.

This time, the Supreme Court ruled 5–4 that, in light of the circuit court's further discussion of "contemporary community standards" in the Miller Test as applied to the Internet, COPA was indeed an unconstitutional restriction on freedom of speech. The court opined that using contemporary community standards to police the Internet would cause more harm than good, due to differing opinions across America about what was acceptable for children or consenting adults on the Internet.

The court ultimately ruled that COPA was too restrictive in light of the First Amendment. Justice Anthony Kennedy, who delivered the majority opinion, suggested that parents and educators could voluntarily adopt Internet filters and related software to reduce the visibility of harmful or unwanted material. In Kennedy's words, "Filters are less restrictive than COPA. They impose selective restrictions on speech at the receiving end, not universal restrictions at the source. ... [T]he Government failed to introduce specific evidence proving that existing filtering technologies are less effective than the restrictions in COPA.”

The court also found that COPA did not pass the strict scrutiny test for governmental speech regulations, because while preventing children from accessing harmful material on the Internet was a compelling government interest, the statute was not narrowly tailored enough to enable other users, including consenting adults, to access such material voluntarily, and (given the availability of filtering software) the statute was not the least restrictive means of achieving the government's goals.

While allowing the injunction against the enforcement of COPA to stand, the Supreme Court gave the government one more chance to argue its case, due to the now clarified definitions of "contemporary community standards" and other matters. Thus the trial portion of the legal challenge was remanded back to the district court.

=== Dissenting opinions ===
Justice Antonin Scalia dissented, arguing that pornography in the media deserved no constitutional protection regardless of the existence of COPA, so that statute should not have been subjected to the strict scrutiny test. Justice Stephen Breyer delivered another dissent, arguing that COPA was indeed the least restrictive means to achieve the government's compelling interest in shielding children from Internet pornography.

== Subsequent developments ==
The case was remanded to the Eastern District of Pennsylvania and went to trial again in 2006, at which time the government was given the opportunity to update its arguments in favor of enforcing COPA. The district court rejected the government's updated arguments, and this decision was appealed again to the Third Circuit. The circuit court ruled against the government again in 2008, once again upholding the injunction against enforcement. The government appealed this decision to the Supreme Court yet again in 2009, but this time the court denied certiorari, effectively striking COPA from the United States Code, with the law never having taken effect.

In 2023, Texas introduced a law requiring pornographic sites like Pornhub to confirm the age of a user via their driver's license to access the site; several other states followed suit. The law was challenged on free speech grounds and was initially ruled unconstitutional under a strict scrutiny analysis at the district court, but that ruling was reversed by the Fifth Circuit, which used a rational basis review standard to find the state had a compelling interest in shielding children from such content. That ruling was appealed to the Supreme Court as Free Speech Coalition v. Paxton, with oral arguments in January 2025. There, the majority of justices questioned whether the decision from Ashcroft, where measures like filtering software could be used, was still valid given the advancement of technology. In a 6–3 decision in June 2025, the Supreme Court ruled that the Texas law passed the intermediate scrutiny test and only incidentally burdened the protected speech of adults.

== See also ==
- List of United States Supreme Court cases, volume 535
- Ashcroft v. Free Speech Coalition (2002), which dealt with a similar law, the Child Pornography Prevention Act of 1996.
