= Kennedy v. Braidwood Management, Inc. =

United States Supreme Court case on the Appointments Clause

- Supreme Court of the United States

Argued April 21, 2025 Decided June 27, 2025
- Full case name: Robert F. Kennedy, Jr., Secretary of Health and Human Services, et al., v. Braidwood Management, Inc., et al.
- Docket no.: 24-316
- Citations: 606 U.S. 748 (more)
- Decision: Opinion

Case history
- Prior: Braidwood Mgmt., Inc. v. Becerra, No. 20-cv-283 (N.D. Tex.) (Mar. 30, 2023); Braidwood Mgmt., Inc. v. Becerra, No. 20-cv-283 (5th Cir.) (June 21, 2024)

Questions presented
- Does the structure of the U.S. Preventive Services Task Force violate the Constitution’s Appointments Clause, and if so, is the provision that insulates the task force from the Health & Human Services secretary’s supervision severable from the rest of the statute?

Holding
- Members of the U. S. Preventive Services Task Force are inferior officers whose appointment by the United States Secretary of Health and Human Services is consistent with the Appointments Clause.

Court membership
- Chief Justice John Roberts Associate Justices Clarence Thomas · Samuel Alito; Sonia Sotomayor · Elena Kagan; Neil Gorsuch · Brett Kavanaugh; Amy Coney Barrett · Ketanji Brown Jackson

Case opinions
- Majority: Kavanaugh, joined by Roberts, Sotomayor, Kagan, Barrett, Jackson
- Dissent: Thomas, joined by Alito, Gorsuch

Kennedy v. Braidwood Management, Inc., 606 U.S. 748 (2025), is a decision of the United States Supreme Court holding that the structure of the U.S. Preventive Services Task Force does not violate the Constitution's Appointments Clause. The defendant was the Secretary of Health and Human Services, which was initially Xavier Becerra, and later Robert F. Kennedy Jr.

== Issue ==
The plaintiffs, including Braidwood Management, argued that the Affordable Care Act (ACA)'s mandate requiring health plans to cover preventive services without cost-sharing violates their constitutional and religious rights. The plaintiffs specifically objected to coverage of pre-exposure prophylaxis for HIV prevention (PrEP) services, citing religious objections to facilitating behavior they oppose, such as homosexual conduct and drug use.

The plaintiffs made two major arguments. The first was that the United States Preventive Services Task Force (USPSTF), which recommends preventive services, was not properly appointed under the Appointments Clause, because this body makes binding recommendations without Senate-confirmed oversight. The second was that covering PrEP violates their religious beliefs in violation of the Religious Freedom Restoration Act, as they object to subsidizing what they view as morally objectionable behaviors.

== Lower court rulings ==
In 2022, U.S. District Judge Reed O'Connor ruled in favor of the plaintiffs on both arguments, in a case then styled as Braidwood Management Inc. v. Becerra, with the named defendant being then-Secretary of Health and Human Services Xavier Becerra. The district court found that the ACA's delegation of authority to the USPSTF violated the Appointments Clause, and that the mandate to cover PrEP violated the plaintiffs' rights under the Religious Freedom Restoration Act (RFRA). On March 30, 2023, Judge O'Connor issued a final ruling striking down the requirement for insurers to cover services recommended by the USPSTF after March 23, 2010, including PrEP, declaring these mandates unconstitutional.

On June 21, 2024, the United States Court of Appeals for the Fifth Circuit issued a decision affirming the district court's determination that the role of the USPSTF in determining mandatory preventive services under the ACA is unconstitutional. However, the court did not issue a nationwide injunction, limiting the immediate effects of the ruling to the plaintiffs. The court declined to rule on the plaintiff's assertion that the Appointments Clause issue also invalidates decisions of the Advisory Committee on Immunization Practices (ACIP), which makes vaccination recommendations, similarly binding insurance companies to cover those costs. The case was then expected to continue, with legal experts anticipating an appeal to the Supreme Court.

It was noted that if the Supreme Court were to ultimately invalidate the USPSTF's authority, it could impact preventive services covered under the ACA, including cancer screenings, immunizations, and PrEP.

== Opinion of the Court ==
The Supreme Court reversed the judgment of the Fifth Circuit and remanded for further proceedings. Justice Kavanaugh delivered the opinion of the Court, joined by Chief Justice Roberts and Justices Sotomayor, Kagan, Barrett, and Jackson. The Supreme Court held that Task Force members were inferior officers, as their work was "directed and supervised" by the Secretary of HHS in two key respects. First, the Secretary can remove Task Force members at will, which provides a powerful means of control over their conduct and decisions. Second, the Secretary has statutory power to review and block Task Force recommendations before they take effect and become binding requirements for insurers.

The majority explained that this arrangement is consistent with precedents in which officers whose decisions were reviewable by superior officers, and who could be removed at will or for cause, were deemed inferior officers. The Court also rejected the argument that statutory provisions describing the Task Force as "independent" and "not subject to political pressure" created for-cause removal protection. The Court found no clear language to overcome the presumption of at-will removal. Finally, the Court concluded that Congress had properly vested appointment authority in the Secretary of HHS. The power to "convene" the Task Force under the 1999 statute was interpreted to include appointment power, and Reorganization Plan No. 3 of 1966 transferred that authority to the Secretary.

== Dissent ==
Justice Thomas filed a dissenting opinion, joined by Justices Alito and Gorsuch. The dissent argued that the Fifth Circuit should have first resolved whether Congress lawfully vested appointment power in the Secretary before addressing whether the appointments satisfied constitutional requirements. Justice Thomas would have vacated the decision and remanded for the Fifth Circuit to address the statutory question in the first instance.
