= Riley v. Bondi =

- Supreme Court of the United States

Decided June 26, 2025
- Full case name: Riley v. Bondi
- Docket no.: 23-1270
- Citations: 606 U.S. 259 (more)

Holding
- An order from the Board of Immigration Appeals denying deferral of removal in a withholding only proceeding is not a final order of removal. The 30-day filing deadline to challenge a final order of removal is a claims-processing rule, not a jurisdictional requirement.

Court membership
- Chief Justice John Roberts Associate Justices Clarence Thomas · Samuel Alito; Sonia Sotomayor · Elena Kagan; Neil Gorsuch · Brett Kavanaugh; Amy Coney Barrett · Ketanji Brown Jackson

Case opinions
- Majority: Alito, joined by Roberts, Thomas, Kavanaugh, Barrett; Sotomayor, Kagan, Gorsuch and Jackson (Part II-B only)
- Concurrence: Thomas
- Dissent: Sotomayor (in part), joined by Kagan, Jackson; Gorsuch (except as to Part IV)

Riley v. Bondi, 606 U.S. 259 (2025), was a United States Supreme Court case in which the court held that an order from the Board of Immigration Appeals denying deferral of removal in a withholding only proceeding is not a final order of removal. The 30-day filing deadline to challenge a final order of removal is a claims-processing rule, not a jurisdictional requirement.

== Background ==
A Jamaican man Pierre Riley was convicted of drug trafficking in 2008. He was taken into immigration custody, pending deportation, upon release from prison in 2021. Riley claimed he could not return to Jamaica safely. An immigration judge found the claim credible and granted a deferral of removal. However, the Board of Immigration Appeals reinstated the original removal order. He petitioned for judicial review of the CAT order but the Fourth Circuit said the petition was untimely because it was filed more than 30 days after the final administrative removal order.

=== Prior case law ===
==== Stone v. INS ====
The Court considered whether a deportation order is final while a motion to reconsider is pending. Although the Court said in ICC v. Locomotive Engineers that the Administrative Procedure Act (5 U.S.C. § 704) language "has long been construed...merely to relieve parties from the requirement of petitioning for rehearing before seeking judicial review...but not to prevent petitions for reconsideration that are actually filed from rendering the orders under reconsideration nonfinal", Justice Kennedy concluded the 1990 amendments to the Immigration and Nationality Act were controlling for deportation procedures.

Riley supersedes Stone which had held that the 30-day deadline to file a petition for review under §1252(b)(1) was "mandatory and jurisdictional".

==== Nasrallah v. Barr ====
Nasrallah v. Barr held that aliens could challenge factual findings underlying the denial of relief under CAT in a consolidated proceeding to modify a removal order so they can be sent to a safe country. The Court held that only "rulings that affect the validity of the final order of removal" merge into that order for the purposes of the zipper clause. The final order of removal was still final, which worked against Riley's arguments in the present case.

== Supreme Court ==
Writing for the Court, Justice Samuel Alito held that "withholding-only proceedings do not disturb the finality of a § 1228(b) final order of removal."

The 30-day filing deadline is a non-jurisdictional claim-processing rule subject to equitable exceptions (minimally waiver and forfeiture), although the court did not decide if the deadline could be equitably tolled. The Court concluded that Stone was inconsistent with decades of precedent.

Conservative justice Neil Gorsuch joined the three liberal justices in a dissent written by Sonia Sotomayor: "One should not be required to appeal an order before it exists." Sotomayor asked how Riley should have appealed the order one year and three months before the Board of Immigration Appeals decided his deferral of removal claim.

== Aftermath ==
Riley overturns circuit court precedents that started the clock for petition for review filing deadlines upon the conclusion of withholding-only or reasonable fear proceedings, including some that were decided after Santos-Zacaria v. Garland.
