= Human Rights Data Analysis Group =

US non-profit organization

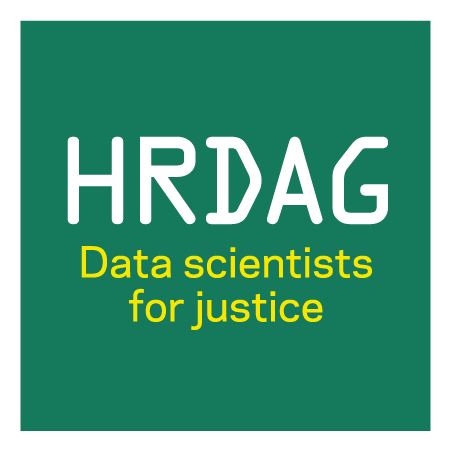
- Founded: 1991
- Founder: Patrick Ball
- Type: Non-profit
- Location: San Francisco, California
- Origins: AAAS Science and Human Rights Program
- Region served: Global
- Product: Data analysis in the field of human rights
- Method: Assisting human rights projects by conducting rigorous scientific and statistical analysis of large-scale human rights abuses
- Owner: Human Rights Data Analysis Group
- Key people: Patrick Ball, Megan Price
- Website: hrdag.org

The Human Rights Data Analysis Group is a nonprofit that applies rigorous science to the analysis of human rights violations around the world.

It was founded in 1991 by Patrick Ball. The organization has published findings on conflicts in Syria, Colombia, Chad, Kosovo, Guatemala, Peru, East Timor, India, Liberia, Bangladesh, and Sierra Leone. The organization provided testimony in the war crimes trials of Slobodan Milošević and Milan Milutinović at the International Criminal Tribunal for the former Yugoslavia, and in Guatemala's Supreme Court in the trial of General José Efraín Ríos Montt, the de facto president of Guatemala in 1982–1983. Gen. Ríos Montt was found guilty of genocide against indigenous people and crimes against humanity and Ball, an expert witness, had to leave the country with other witnesses after facing threats. The group has used capture-recapture methods to do their statistical analysis.

Around 2016, the organization published statistics on police violence in the United States. They have also worked with the Innocence Project in New Orleans to exonerate those who were wrongfully accused. In 2017, the organization was helping to predict the location of mass graves in Mexico so families stood a better chance of finding their missing loved ones. Ball's first experience being part of a journalistic investigation came around 2019 when he helped journalists document the killings associated with the war on drugs in the Philippines.

In 2026, Cory Doctorow praised Ball and the organization for their work in helping expose human rights abuses, hold oppressive states to account and inform truth and reconciliation commissions.

== Organization ==
The Human Rights Data Analysis Group was founded in December 1991 by Patrick Ball as a part of the Science and Human Rights Program within the American Association for the Advancement of Science. It moved to the non-profit umbrella company Benetech on November 3, 2003 that had just hired Ball to run their human rights program. On February 1, 2013, HRDAG became an independent nonprofit organization, fiscally sponsored by Community Partners.
