= Gutierrez v. Saenz =

- Supreme Court of the United States

Decided June 26, 2025
- Full case name: Gutierrez v. Saenz
- Docket no.: 23-7809
- Citations: 606 U.S. 305 (more)

Holding
- A person sentenced to death had standing to challenge Texas DNA-testing procedures under the Due Process Clause.

Court membership
- Chief Justice John Roberts Associate Justices Clarence Thomas · Samuel Alito; Sonia Sotomayor · Elena Kagan; Neil Gorsuch · Brett Kavanaugh; Amy Coney Barrett · Ketanji Brown Jackson

Case opinions
- Majority: Sotomayor, joined by Roberts, Kagan, Kavanaugh, Jackson; Barrett (except part II-B-2)
- Concurrence: Barrett (in part)
- Dissent: Thomas
- Dissent: Alito, joined by Thomas, Gorsuch

Laws applied
- Due Process Clause

Gutierrez v. Saenz, 606 U.S. 305 (2025), was a United States Supreme Court case in which the court held that a person sentenced to death had standing to challenge Texas DNA-testing procedures under the Due Process Clause.

== Background ==
In 1998, Texas charged Ruben Gutierrez with capital murder for his involvement in the murder of Escolastica Harrison. The State's theory at trial was that Gutierrez wielded one of the two screwdrivers used to stab Harrison to death in her mobile home. The jury convicted Gutierrez of capital murder. At the sentencing phase of Gutierrez's trial, the jury was required to answer whether Texas proved beyond a reasonable doubt that Gutierrez actually caused Harrison's death or, if not, that he intended to kill her or anticipated that a human life would be taken. The jury answered yes, and Gutierrez was sentenced to death.

For nearly 15 years, Gutierrez has sought DNA testing of evidence he claims would prove he was not in Harrison's home the night of the murder. Texas's Article 64 allows DNA testing where a "convicted person establishes by a preponderance of the evidence" that he "would not have been convicted if exculpatory results had been obtained through DNA testing," among other criteria. Invoking Article 64, Gutierrez twice moved in state court for DNA testing of untested crime scene evidence. The trial court denied his first request in 2010, and the Texas Court of Criminal Appeals (TCCA) affirmed. The court reasoned that even if Gutierrez's DNA was not found on the tested items, that would not establish his innocence of capital murder because he would still be a party to the robbery that resulted in Harrison's death. The court concluded that Gutierrez could not use Article 64 to show he was wrongly sentenced to death unless he could also establish his innocence of the underlying crime. In 2019, Gutierrez again sought DNA testing, but Texas courts denied his motion. On appeal, the TCCA reiterated that DNA testing was not available to show only death penalty ineligibility.

Gutierrez then filed suit in federal court under Section 1983 against Luis Saenz, the district attorney who has custody of the untested evidence. Gutierrez argued that Texas's DNA testing procedures violated his liberty interests in utilizing state postconviction procedures. The district court agreed and granted declaratory relief, finding it fundamentally unfair that Texas gives prisoners the right to challenge their death sentence through habeas corpus petitions but prevents them from obtaining DNA testing to support those petitions unless they can establish innocence of the underlying crime. The Fifth Circuit vacated the district court's judgment and held that Gutierrez lacked standing to bring his Section 1983 suit, finding that his claimed injury was not redressable because a declaratory judgment would be unlikely to cause the prosecutor to reverse course and allow testing.
