= Esteras v. United States =

- Supreme Court of the United States

Decided June 20, 2025
- Full case name: Esteras v. United States
- Docket no.: 23-7483
- Citations: 606 U.S. 185 (more)

Holding
- A district court considering whether to revoke a defendant’s term of supervised release may not consider §3553(a)(2)(A), which covers retribution vis-à-vis the defendant's underlying criminal offense.

Court membership
- Chief Justice John Roberts Associate Justices Clarence Thomas · Samuel Alito; Sonia Sotomayor · Elena Kagan; Neil Gorsuch · Brett Kavanaugh; Amy Coney Barrett · Ketanji Brown Jackson

Case opinions
- Majority: Barrett, joined by Roberts, Thomas, Kagan, Kavanaugh; Sotomayor, Jackson (except part II-B)
- Concurrence: Sotomayor (in part), joined by Jackson
- Concurrence: Jackson (in part)
- Dissent: Alito, joined by Gorsuch

Laws applied
- 18 U.S.C. § 3553(a)(2)(A)

Esteras v. United States, 606 U.S. 185 (2025), was a United States Supreme Court case in which the court held that a district court considering whether to revoke a defendant's term of supervised release may not consider 18 U.S.C. § 3553(a)(2)(A), which covers retribution vis-à-vis the defendant’s underlying criminal offense.

== Background ==
Edgardo Esteras pleaded guilty to conspiring to distribute heroin, and the district court sentenced him to 12 months in prison followed by a six-year term of supervised release. While on supervised release, Esteras was arrested and charged with domestic violence and other crimes. The district court revoked Esteras’s supervised release and ordered 24 months of reimprisonment, explaining that Esteras's earlier sentence had been "rather lenient" and that his revocation sentence must "promote respect for the law," a consideration enumerated in §3553(a)(2)(A). The Sixth Circuit affirmed, holding that a district court may consider §3553(a)(2)(A) when revoking supervised release.
