= Diamond Alternative Energy, LLC v. Environmental Protection Agency =

- Supreme Court of the United States

Decided June 20, 2025
- Full case name: Diamond Alternative Energy, LLC v. Environmental Protection Agency
- Docket no.: 24-7
- Citations: 606 U.S. 100 (more)

Holding
- The fuel producers have Article III standing to challenge the EPA's approval under the Clean Air Act of California regulations requiring automakers to manufacture more electric vehicles and fewer gasoline-powered vehicles.

Court membership
- Chief Justice John Roberts Associate Justices Clarence Thomas · Samuel Alito; Sonia Sotomayor · Elena Kagan; Neil Gorsuch · Brett Kavanaugh; Amy Coney Barrett · Ketanji Brown Jackson

Case opinions
- Majority: Kavanaugh
- Dissent: Sotomayor
- Dissent: Jackson

Diamond Alternative Energy, LLC v. Environmental Protection Agency, 606 U.S. 100 (2025), was a United States Supreme Court case in which the court held that the fuel producers have Article III standing to challenge the Environmental Protection Agency's approval under the Clean Air Act of California regulations requiring automakers to manufacture more electric vehicles and fewer gasoline-powered vehicles.

== Background ==
Under the Clean Air Act, the Environmental Protection Agency (EPA) approved California regulations that require automakers to manufacture more electric vehicles and fewer gasoline-powered vehicles with a goal of decreasing emissions from liquid fuels. The regulations require automakers to limit average greenhouse-gas emissions across their vehicle fleets and manufacture a certain percentage of electric vehicles. Several producers of fuels such as gasoline and ethanol sued the EPA in the D.C. Circuit, arguing that the EPA lacked authority to approve the California regulations because they target global climate change rather than local California air quality problems as required by the Clean Air Act. They submitted standing declarations explaining that California’s regulations depress demand for liquid fuel by requiring vehicles that use less or no liquid fuel, causing the fuel producers monetary injury. California’s own estimates indicated the regulations would cause substantial reductions in demand for gasoline exceeding $1 billion beginning in 2020 and increasing to over $10 billion in 2030.

EPA did not challenge the fuel producers’ standing in the D.C. Circuit. California, as well as other States adopting California’s regulations, intervened to defend the EPA's approval. California argued that the fuel producers lacked standing because automobile manufacturers would not change course if EPA’s decision were vacated given the "surging consumer demand" for electric vehicles. The D.C. Circuit held that the fuel producers lacked Article III standing, finding they failed to establish that automakers would likely respond to invalidation of the regulations by producing fewer electric vehicles and more gasoline-powered vehicles.
