= Food and Drug Administration v. R.J. Reynolds Vapor Co. =

- Supreme Court of the United States

Argued January 21, 2025 Decided June 20, 2025
- Full case name: Food and Drug Administration v. R.J. Reynolds Vapor Co.
- Docket no.: 23-1187
- Citations: 606 U.S. 226 (more)
- Argument: Oral argument
- Decision: Opinion

Holding
- Retailers who would sell a new tobacco product if not for the FDA's denial order may seek judicial review of that order.

Court membership
- Chief Justice John Roberts Associate Justices Clarence Thomas · Samuel Alito; Sonia Sotomayor · Elena Kagan; Neil Gorsuch · Brett Kavanaugh; Amy Coney Barrett · Ketanji Brown Jackson

Case opinions
- Majority: Barrett, joined by Roberts, Thomas, Alito, Kagan, Gorsuch, Kavanaugh
- Dissent: Jackson, joined by Sotomayor

Food and Drug Administration v. R.J. Reynolds Vapor Co., 606 U.S. 226 (2025), was a United States Supreme Court case in which the court held that retailers who would sell a new tobacco product if not for the Food and Drug Administration's denial order may seek judicial review of that order.

== Background ==
The Family Smoking Prevention and Tobacco Control Act (TCA) requires manufacturers to apply for and receive approval from the Food and Drug Administration (FDA) before marketing any "new tobacco product." In 2016, the FDA decided that e-cigarettes and related products were new tobacco products subject to the TCA. Given the size of the existing e-cigarette market, the FDA announced that it would defer enforcement of the TCA against e-cigarette manufacturers and retailers while the manufacturers sought FDA approval. R. J. Reynolds Vapor Co. (RJR Vapor)—a manufacturer of e-cigarettes—sought FDA approval to continue marketing its popular Vuse Alto products. The FDA denied the applications, finding that RJR Vapor had failed to demonstrate that marketing Vuse Alto products would be "appropriate for the protection of the public health" as required by the TCA. The FDA's order sounded the death knell for a significant portion of the e-cigarette market, and RJR Vapor sought to challenge it.

The TCA provides that "any person adversely affected" by an FDA denial order can petition for judicial review in either the D.C. Circuit or "the circuit in which such person resides or has their principal place of business." Had RJR Vapor sought judicial review on its own, it could have filed a petition in the D.C. Circuit (the statutory default) or the Fourth Circuit (which includes North Carolina, RJR Vapor's state of incorporation and principal place of business). RJR Vapor instead combined forces with a Texas-based retailer and a Mississippi-based trade association of retailers to challenge the FDA's denial order in the Fifth Circuit (which includes both Texas and Mississippi). In response, the FDA asked the court to either dismiss the joint petition for lack of venue or transfer it to the D. C. Circuit or Fourth Circuit. The FDA argued that only a disappointed applicant—in this case, RJR Vapor—is "adversely affected" by an FDA denial order within the meaning of the TCA. Because the retailers had no right to seek review, the FDA argued, the petition had no basis for being in the Fifth Circuit. A divided Fifth Circuit panel concluded venue was proper and denied the FDA's motion.
