= McLaughlin Chiropractic Associates, Inc. v. McKesson Corp. =

- Supreme Court of the United States

Decided June 20, 2025
- Full case name: McLaughlin Chiropractic Associates, Inc. v. McKesson Corp.
- Docket no.: 23-1226
- Citations: 606 U.S. 146 (more)

Holding
- The Hobbs Act does not bind district courts in civil enforcement proceedings to an agency's interpretation of a statute. District courts must independently determine the law's meaning under ordinary principles of statutory interpretation while affording appropriate respect to the agency's interpretation.

Court membership
- Chief Justice John Roberts Associate Justices Clarence Thomas · Samuel Alito; Sonia Sotomayor · Elena Kagan; Neil Gorsuch · Brett Kavanaugh; Amy Coney Barrett · Ketanji Brown Jackson

Case opinions
- Majority: Kavanaugh
- Dissent: Kagan, joined by Sotomayor, Jackson

Laws applied
- Hobbs Act

McLaughlin Chiropractic Associates, Inc. v. McKesson Corp., 606 U.S. 146 (2025), was a United States Supreme Court case in which the court held that the Hobbs Act does not bind district courts in civil enforcement proceedings to an agency's interpretation of a statute. District courts must independently determine the law's meaning under ordinary principles of statutory interpretation while affording appropriate respect to the agency's interpretation. At issue in the case was the interpretation of the Telephone Consumer Protection Act of 1991 by the Federal Communications Commission.

== See also ==
- Loper Bright Enterprises v. Raimondo
