= Megan Price =

Director of the Human Rights Data Analysis Group

Megan E. Price
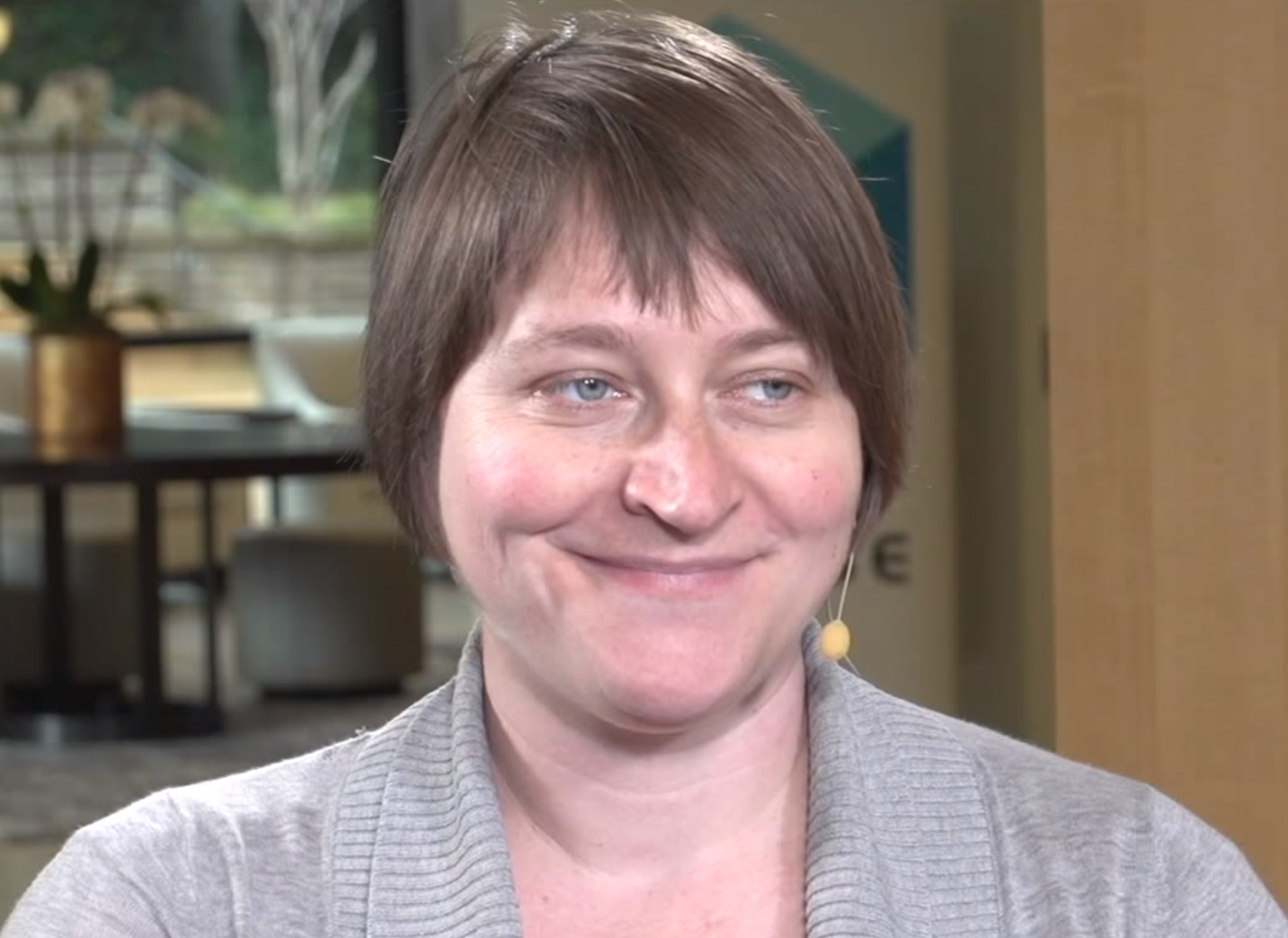
- Price interviewed at Women in Data Science 2017
- Education: Case Western Reserve University; Rollins School of Public Health
- Employer: Human Rights Data Analysis Group

Megan E. Price is Executive Director of the Human Rights Data Analysis Group. She collects and analyses data to investigate violations to human rights.

== Early life and education ==
Price studied statistics at Case Western Reserve University. She earned a PhD in biostatistics from the Rollins School of Public Health in 2009. She completed a Certificate in Human Rights at Emory University. As soon as she graduated she began working with the Human Rights Data Analysis Group.

== Career ==
Price has worked on strategies for the statistical analysis of human rights data in Colombia, Syria and Guatemala. Whilst in Guatemala, Price analysed documents from the National Police Archives. In Syria she was commissioned by the Office of the United Nations High Commissioner for Human Rights to act as lead statistician on two reports. She is a Research Fellow at Carnegie Mellon University in the Centre for Human Rights Science.

She was made Director of Research at the Human Rights Data Analysis Group in 2013. She was appointed Executive Director in 2015. In 2016 she was awarded an Open Society Foundations New Executive Fund. Price is on the editorial board of Significance magazine. She was a participant at the 2018 Science Foo Camp. She was elected chair of the American Statistical Association's Social Statistics program in 2021. In 2022, she was named a Fellow of the American Statistical Association.
