= Chris Hansen (attorney) =

American civil rights lawyer

Christopher A. Hansen is an American civil rights attorney, notable for litigating many cases while at the ACLU, including the AMP v. Myriad Genetics (2013) case at the US Supreme Court and the ACLU's efforts in ACLU v. Reno (1997). Hansen was at the ACLU for 40 years, from 1973 to 2013, retiring as Senior National Staff Counsel, and the ACLU's longest-serving attorney.

Hansen graduated from Carleton College in 1969 and earned his J.D. degree from the University of Chicago. He joined the ACLU in 1973, working with its newly founded Mental Health Law Project.

== Notable cases litigated ==
- ACLU v. Reno (1997)
- NYSARC v. Carey, 393 F.Supp. 715 (EDNY 1975) (the Willowbrook case)
- ACLU v. Miller (N.D. Georgia 1997)
- ALA v. Pataki (SDNY June 20, 1997)
- Brown v. Board of Education (re-opened)
- G.L. v. Zumwalt, 564 F.Supp. 1030 (W.D. Mo. 1983), 731 F.Supp. 365 (W.D. Mo. 1990), 873 F.Supp. 252 (W.D. Mo. 1994)
- Jones v. Clinton, ACLU amicus brief
- Freeman v. Pitts, 503 U.S. 467 (1992)
- Association for Molecular Pathology v. Myriad Genetics (2013)

== Further research ==
- Sept. 11, 2013, "From Willowbrook to Myriad: Insights from Four Decades at the ACLU", Vanderbilt University
