= List of United States Supreme Court cases, volume 606 =

This is a list of all the United States Supreme Court cases from volume 606 of the United States Reports:

Note: As of July 2025, final bound volumes for the U.S. Supreme Court's United States Reports have been published through volume 582 (June 2017). Newer cases from subsequent future volumes do not yet have official page numbers and typically use three underscores in place of the page number; e.g., Example v. United States, 700 U.S. ___ (2050).

Case name	Docket no.	Date decided
Fuld v. Palestine Liberation Organization	24–20	June 20, 2025
The PSJVTA's personal jurisdiction provision does not violate the Fifth Amendment's Due Process Clause because the statute reasonably ties the assertion of jurisdiction over the PLO and PA to conduct involving the United States and implicating sensitive foreign policy matters within the prerogative of the political branches.
Stanley v. City of Sanford	23–997	June 20, 2025
Only individuals who "hold" or "desire" a position are considered "qualified individuals" under Title I of the ADA. Therefore, once an employee retires, they no longer meet this definition and cannot bring a discrimination claim regarding benefit changes. As a result, the court dismissed the suit challenging cuts to post-employment benefits.
Diamond Alternative Energy, LLC v. Environmental Protection Agency	24–7	June 20, 2025
The fuel producers have Article III standing to challenge the EPA's approval under the Clean Air Act of California regulations requiring automakers to manufacture more electric vehicles and fewer gasoline-powered vehicles.
McLaughlin Chiropractic Associates, Inc. v. McKesson Corp.	23–1226	June 20, 2025
The Hobbs Act does not bind district courts in civil enforcement proceedings to an agency's interpretation of a statute. District courts must independently determine the law's meaning under ordinary principles of statutory interpretation while affording appropriate respect to the agency's interpretation.
Esteras v. United States	23–7483	June 20, 2025
A district court considering whether to revoke a defendant’s term of supervised release may not consider §3553(a)(2)(A), which covers retribution vis-à-vis the defendant's underlying criminal offense.
Food and Drug Administration v. R.J. Reynolds Vapor Co.	23–1187	June 20, 2025
Retailers who would sell a new tobacco product if not for the FDA's denial order may seek judicial review of that order.
Riley v. Bondi	23–1270	June 26, 2025
An order from the Board of Immigration Appeals denying deferral of removal in a withholding only proceeding is not a final order of removal. The 30-day filing deadline to challenge a final order of removal is a claims-processing rule, not a jurisdictional requirement.
Gutierrez v. Saenz	23–7809	June 26, 2025
A person sentenced to death had standing to challenge Texas DNA-testing procedures under the Due Process Clause.
Medina v. Planned Parenthood South Atlantic	23–1275	June 26, 2025
Section 1396a(a)(23)(A) of the Medicaid Act does not clearly and unambiguously confer individual rights enforceable under 42 U.S.C. § 1983.
Hewitt v. United States	23–1002	June 26, 2025
All first-time 18 U.S.C. §924(c) offenders who appear for sentencing after the First Step Act's enactment date, including those whose previous §924(c) sentences have been vacated and who thus need to be resentenced, are subject to the Act’s revised penalties.
Free Speech Coalition, Inc. v. Paxton	23–1122	June 27, 2025
H. B. 1181 triggers, and survives, review under intermediate scrutiny because it only incidentally burdens the protected speech of adults.
Mahmoud v. Taylor	24–297	June 27, 2025
Parents challenging the Board’s introduction of the "LGBTQ+-inclusive" storybooks, along with its decision to withhold opt-outs, are entitled to a preliminary injunction.
Federal Communications Commission v. Consumers' Research	24–354	June 27, 2025
The universal-service contribution scheme does not violate the nondelegation doctrine.
Kennedy v. Braidwood Management, Inc.	24–316	June 27, 2025
Members of the U. S. Preventive Services Task Force are inferior officers whose appointment by the United States Secretary of Health and Human Services is consistent with the Appointments Clause.
Trump v. CASA, Inc.	24A884	June 27, 2025
Universal injunctions likely exceed the equitable authority that Congress has given to federal courts.

== See also ==
- List of United States Supreme Court cases by the Roberts Court
- 2024 term opinions of the Supreme Court of the United States
