= Child Online Protection Act =

Former U.S. law to protect minors from harmful material on the Internet

- Acronyms (colloquial): COPA

Citations
- Public law: Pub. L. 105–277 (text) (PDF)
- Statutes at Large: 112 Stat. 2681-736

Codification
- Titles amended: 47
- U.S.C. sections created: 47 U.S.C. § 231

Legislative history
- Introduced in the House as H.R. 4328; Signed into law by President Bill Clinton on October 21, 1998

United States Supreme Court cases
- Ashcroft v. American Civil Liberties Union I 535 U.S. 564 (2002); Ashcroft v. American Civil Liberties Union II, 542 U.S. 656 (2004)

The Child Online Protection Act (COPA) was an American statute, passed in 1998, with the declared purpose of restricting access to any material defined as harmful to minors on the Internet. The statute never took effect as three separate rounds of litigation led to a permanent injunction against it in 2009.

COPA required all commercial distributors of "material harmful to minors" to restrict their sites from access by underage children. That content was defined as material that by "contemporary community standards" was judged to appeal to the "prurient interest" and that showed sexual acts or nudity (including female breasts). This is a much broader standard than obscenity.

== Legal history ==
The statute was part of a series of efforts by American lawmakers to regulate and restrict Internet pornography and other types of indecent or obscene material. The earlier Communications Decency Act had been struck down as unconstitutional by the Supreme Court in Reno v. ACLU in 1997. COPA was a direct response to that decision, narrowing the range of material covered. COPA only limited commercial speech and only affected content creators based in the United States. COPA also attempted to replace the previous statute's restrictions on "obscenity" and "indecency" with a rhetorical focus on protecting children from harm.

The American Civil Liberties Union (ACLU), as it had for the earlier Communications Decency Act, immediately challenged COPA in court on constitutional grounds. In 1999, the act was initially enjoined by the U.S. District Court for the Eastern District of Pennsylvania as a violation of the First Amendment. That decision was upheld by the Court of Appeals for the Third Circuit, which added that the text of the act was overbroad as well.

In 2002, the U.S. Supreme Court ruled that the Third Circuit decision was insufficiently supported and remanded the case back to that court, which then struck down the statute again, adding that it would hinder protected speech among adults. The government again appealed to the Supreme Court. In 2004, in the second iteration of Ashcroft v. American Civil Liberties Union, the Supreme Court upheld the injunction against enforcing the statute on First Amendment grounds.

Given the possible compelling government interest in protecting children from harmful Internet content, the Supreme Court remanded the case back to the Eastern Pennsylvania District Court for a trial in 2006 in which the government would be required to argue that its techniques were the least restrictive means to achieve that goal. That court again struck down COPA, finding the statute facially in violation of the First and Fifth Amendments to the U.S. Constitution. That injunction was again upheld by the Third Circuit in 2008. The government attempted one more appeal to the Supreme Court, but that court turned down the request in 2009, effectively shutting down the statute.
