= Mahmoud v. Taylor =

- Supreme Court of the United States

Argued April 22, 2025 Decided June 27, 2025
- Full case name: Tamer Mahmoud, et al. v. Thomas W. Taylor, et al.
- Docket no.: 24-297
- Citations: 606 U.S. 522 (more)
- Argument: Oral argument
- Decision: Opinion

Case history
- Prior: Preliminary injunction denied, Mahmoud v. McKnight, 688 F. Supp. 3d 265 (D. Md. 2023); affirmed, 102 F.4th 191 (4th Cir. 2024); cert. granted (Jan. 17, 2025)

Questions presented
- "Do public schools burden parents' religious exercise when they compel elementary school children to participate in instruction on gender and sexuality against their parents' religious convictions and without notice or opportunity to opt out?"

Holding
- Parents challenging the Board's introduction of the "LGBTQ+-inclusive" storybooks, along with its decision to withhold opt-outs, are entitled to a preliminary injunction.

Court membership
- Chief Justice John Roberts Associate Justices Clarence Thomas · Samuel Alito; Sonia Sotomayor · Elena Kagan; Neil Gorsuch · Brett Kavanaugh; Amy Coney Barrett · Ketanji Brown Jackson

Case opinions
- Majority: Alito, joined by Roberts, Thomas, Gorsuch, Kavanaugh, Barrett
- Concurrence: Thomas
- Dissent: Sotomayor, joined by Kagan, Jackson

Laws applied
- U.S. Const. amend. I

Mahmoud v. Taylor, 606 U.S. 522 (2025), is a landmark United States Supreme Court decision about parents who wished to opt their children out of instruction involving LGBTQ-themed storybooks in a Maryland public school system. The Court held that the school district's policy of not permitting opt-outs violated the parents' right to free exercise of religion under the First Amendment.

== Background ==
In November 2022, the Montgomery County Board of Education in Maryland approved several LGBTQ-inclusive children's books as supplemental curriculum for its language arts program. One book was added for each year from pre-kindergarten through fifth grade. Montgomery County Public Schools (MCPS) teachers were not required to use any of the new materials.

At first, the schools notified parents before the books would be used, and accommodated requests to have their children excused; then, in March 2023, the school district changed the policy, no longer allowing opt-outs "for any reason". Lawyers for the school system said the "growing number of opt-out requests gave rise to three related concerns: high student absenteeism, the infeasibility of administering opt-outs across classrooms and schools, and the risk of exposing students who believe the storybooks represent them and their families to social stigma and isolation." MCPS said it decided to stop the opt-outs because it was receiving too many requests not based on religion.

Three sets of parents sued Montgomery County's school board and Superintendent Thomas Taylor, alleging their First Amendment and due process rights were violated. The lead plaintiffs, Tamer Mahmoud and Enas Barakat, were Muslim and had a son in elementary school. Additional plaintiffs were Chris and Melissa Persak, who were Roman Catholic and had two elementary-age children, Jeff and Svitlana Roman, who were Roman Catholic and Ukrainian Orthodox and had an elementary-age son, and parents-rights group "Kids First".

=== Books ===
The books added to the MCPS supplementary curriculum were:

- Pre-K: Pride Puppy by Robin Stevenson
- Kindergarten: Uncle Bobby's Wedding by Sarah S. Brannen
- 1st grade: IntersectionAllies: We Make Room for All by Carolyn Choi and Chelsea Johnson
- 2nd grade: My Rainbow by DeShanna Neal and Trinity Neal
- 3rd grade: Prince & Knight by Daniel Haack
- 4th grade: Love, Violet by Charlotte Sullivan Wild
- 5th grade: Born Ready: The True Story of a Boy Named Penelope by Jodie Patterson

In February 2024, MCPS removed Pride Puppy and My Rainbow from the approved curriculum, although the books remained available in school libraries. A spokeswoman told The Washington Post that the schools removed the books through their own review process and not due to parental requests.

=== Arguments ===
The plaintiffs relied on the precedent of Wisconsin v. Yoder (1972), in which the Court ruled that Amish families cannot be forced to send their children to school after the eighth grade. The parents argued that if the First Amendment protects dropping out, it must also cover the narrower request of parents who wish to remove their children from "discrete instruction that deliberately seeks to confound their religious values". The parents sought to be notified when their children would receive "instruction on gender and sexuality in violation of their parents' religious beliefs" and the opportunity to opt their children out of the instruction. The lawsuit did not challenge the adoption of the books in the curriculum or ability of teachers to read the books to other students.

In Lyng v. Northwest Indian Cemetery Protective Ass'n (1988), the Supreme Court ruled that the Constitution's Free Exercise Clause in the First Amendment prohibits government actions that tend "to coerce individuals into acting contrary to their religious beliefs." MCPS argued that a family's choice to send their children to public school demonstrates that they "are not cognizably coerced by virtue of their children's exposure there to religiously objectionable ideas." Its lawyers also argued that requiring schools to allow opt-outs would have broad impacts, such as requiring public schools to grant religious exemptions from books depicting interfaith or multiracial families or lessons about historical figures who happen to be gay.

== Trial history ==
=== District Court ===
The parents petitioned the United States District Court for the District of Maryland, alleging that the Board's no-opt-out policy infringed their right to the free exercise of their religion. In August 2023, Judge Deborah L. Boardman denied the parents' request for a preliminary injunction that would restore the policy allowing them to opt their children out of lessons. "With or without an opt-out right, the parents remain free to pursue their sacred obligations to instruct their children in their faiths," Boardman wrote. "Even if their children's exposure to religiously offensive ideas makes the parents' efforts less likely to succeed, that does not amount to a government-imposed burden on their religious exercise."

=== Appeals Court ===
The plaintiffs appealed to the United States Court of Appeals for the Fourth Circuit, which upheld the District Court's decision in a 2–1 ruling in May 2024. The appellate court found the record lacked evidence that the schools compelled families to change or violate their religious beliefs. In the majority opinion, Judge G. Steven Agee wrote, "simply hearing about other views does not necessarily exert pressure to believe or act differently than one's religious faith requires."

== Supreme Court ==
The petitioners subsequently appealed to the Supreme Court, which in January 2025 agreed to hear the case.

The Supreme Court heard oral arguments on April 22, 2025. Court observers said the conservative majority seemed ready to back the parents and require schools to provide opt-outs to protect religious freedom, while the liberal justices raised questions of how far such opt-outs would extend if the court ruled in the parents' favor.

On June 27, 2025, in a 6–3 decision, the Court sided with the parents, stating that the government burdens parents' religious exercise when it requires their children to participate in instruction that violates the families' religious beliefs. The majority opinion, written by Justice Samuel Alito, rejected the school board's claim that book readings were mere exposure to a "viewpoint about same-sex marriage and gender" but the evidence "encouraged teachers to reinforce this viewpoint and to reprimand any children who disagree."

The Court declined to limit Yoder to its facts. The theory that Yoder was a "hybrid case" is considered by dissenting justice Sonia Sotomayor however the majority does not decide that question. Instead, the Court emphasizes that strict scrutiny applies whenever religious exercise is burdened by the state's interest in compulsory education:

We need not consider whether the case before us qualifies as such a "hybrid rights" case. Rather, it is sufficient to note that the burden imposed here is of the exact same character as that in Yoder. That is enough to conclude that here, as in Yoder, strict scrutiny is appropriate regardless of whether the policy is neutral and generally applicable.

The Court held that under Fulton v. Philadelphia the school board policy could not survive strict scrutiny analysis because opt outs were allowed for non-religious classroom activities.

=== Dissent ===
Sotomayor wrote, "This Court has made clear that mere exposure to objectionable ideas does not give rise to a free exercise claim (...) Simply being exposed to beliefs contrary to your own does not "prohibi[t]" the "free exercise" of your religion (...) countless interactions that occur every day in public schools might expose children to messages that conflict with a parent's religious beliefs. If that is sufficient to trigger strict scrutiny, then little is not."

== Reaction and subsequent developments ==
Republicans, parents' rights groups, and the Liberty Counsel supported the Court's decision. President Donald Trump endorsed the ruling during a press conference on June 28, calling it a "tremendous ruling for parents" but noting that he was "surprised that it went this far". U.S. representative Andy Harris, who represents Maryland's 1st congressional district and chairs the House Freedom Caucus, called the ruling "a victory for parental rights and religious freedom across the country", while the Freedom Caucus released its own statement celebrating the ruling as a "clear rebuke" of what it called a "growing trend of government overreach into family life". Maryland Senate minority leader Steve Hershey called the ruling "common sense" and criticized Montgomery County Public Schools' policy against opt-outs as "authoritarian" and "extreme".

The Court's decision was criticised by LGBTQ+ advocates and several Montgomery County Democrats. U.S. representative Jamie Raskin, who represents Maryland's 8th congressional district, called the decision "cruel" and expressed concerns about potential ramifications for public education, questioning whether it would allow students to opt out of science and history lessons involving evolution or wars because it conflicted with their family's religious beliefs. Maryland Attorney General Anthony Brown defended the use of LGBTQ-inclusive storybooks in classroom instruction, saying that they "help teachers create classrooms where all students can thrive and feel safe, regardless of their gender identity or sexual orientation".

Following the Mahmoud ruling, Montgomery County Public Schools approved 58 requests from 43 families to opt out of specific books and readings.

In December 2025, the Supreme Court granted certiorari, vacated the judgment, and remanded Miller v. McDonald to the United States Court of Appeals for the Second Circuit for further consideration in light of the Mahmoud ruling.

== See also ==
- List of LGBTQ-related cases in the United States Supreme Court
