= American Civil Liberties Union v. Miller =

1997 court case

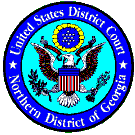
- Court: United States District Court for the Northern District of Georgia
- Full case name: American Civil Liberties Union v. Miller
- Decided: June 23 1997
- Citation: 977 F.Supp. 1228

Holding
- A state can not prohibit individuals from using the Internet anonymously.

Case opinions
- Majority: Marvin Herman Shoob

Laws applied
- Online anonymity

American Civil Liberties Union v. Miller, 977 F.Supp. 1228 (1997), was a court case in the United States District Court for the Northern District of Georgia between the ACLU and Georgia governor Zell Miller. The case was an early precedent on the ability of individuals to use the World Wide Web anonymously.

== Background ==
In 1996 the Georgia General Assembly passed legislation that sought to prevent anonymous speech via fictitious identities when using the Internet in the state of Georgia. Governor Zell Miller signed the legislation into effect. Several advocacy groups that supported Internet privacy and anonymity sought to have the law overturned as a First Amendment violation, and enlisted legal support from the American Civil Liberties Union.

The Georgia statute prohibited:

any person ... knowingly to transmit any data through a computer network ... for the purpose of setting up, maintaining, operating, or exchanging data with an electronic mailbox, home page, or any other electronic information storage bank or point of access to electronic information if such data uses any individual name ... to falsely identify the person.

The Georgia statute also included provisions about unauthorized use of trademarks and copyrights to assume a false identity.

In the view of the ACLU, the forceful public disclosure of the true identities of Internet users would violate privacy and would reveal the sensitive information of users who did not wish to make their identities public. Thus, the ACLU challenged the constitutionality of the Georgia statute in its entirety and requested a preliminary injunction. The ACLU also argued that the Georgia statute would give that state too much authority over the World Wide Web.

== Opinion ==
The district court issued a preliminary injunction against any future enforcement of the Georgia statute, holding that the statute presented a threat of irreparable injury to the rights of the plaintiffs and those they represented, that such injuries outweighed any benefits gained by the state in allowing the statute to stand, and that the public had an interest in the injunction. Determining that the Georgia statute, if enforced, would violate citizens' free speech rights and had possibly already created a chilled speech effect, the court held that an immediate injunction against allowing the statute to go into effect was warranted. The court also held that Georgia already had less restrictive means for achieving the specific goals of the statute, including protections for trademarks and trade secrets.

Georgia claimed that the ACLU had no standing to sue and had not demonstrated any injury-in-fact from possible future prosecutions, but the court found this argument unpersuasive in light of possible violations of constitutional rights. The court ultimately upheld the right to anonymous speech on the Internet, because the speaker's identity is an item of content that the speaker has the right to include or keep secret by choice, and Georgia had failed to deliver a compelling governmental interest in requiring speakers to identify themselves if they choose to be anonymous. The state also failed to convince the court that the statute was narrowly tailored to achieve its goal of preventing fraud, because the statute was overbroad and likely to sweep up many other kinds of speech. And finally. the statute was found to be unconstitutionally vague because the average person would be unable to determine how to avoid the proscribed criminal penalties.

== Impact ==
This case established the right to anonymous speech for Internet users, within the established Constitutional right of free speech. In turn, the ruling has been cited as an important early precedent in the application of American constitutional rights to the then-new medium of Internet communication.
