= Ginsberg v. New York =

- Supreme Court of the United States

Argued January 16, 1968 Decided April 22, 1968
- Full case name: Sam Ginsberg, Appellant v. State of New York
- Citations: 390 U.S. 629 (more) 88 S. Ct. 1274; 20 L. Ed. 2d 195; 1968 U.S. LEXIS 1880; 44 Ohio Op. 2d 339; 1 Media L. Rep. 1424

Holding
- Material that is not obscene for adults may still be considered obscene towards minors and regulated

Court membership
- Chief Justice Earl Warren Associate Justices Hugo Black · William O. Douglas; John M. Harlan II · William J. Brennan Jr. Potter Stewart · Byron White; Abe Fortas · Thurgood Marshall

Case opinions
- Majority: Brennan, joined by Warren, White, Marshall
- Concurrence: Harlan
- Concurrence: Stewart
- Dissent: Douglas, joined by Black
- Dissent: Fortas

Laws applied
- U.S. Const. amend. I

Ginsberg v. New York, 390 U.S. 629 (1968), was a United States Supreme Court case in which the Court ruled that material that is not obscene may nonetheless be harmful for children, and its marketing may be regulated.

== Background ==
Under New York law, it was illegal to willfully sell to a minor under 17 any picture that depicts nudity, is harmful to minors, and any magazine taken as a whole is harmful to minors.

Sam Ginsberg and his wife operated Sam's Stationery and Luncheonette in Bellmore, Long Island. In it they sold magazines including those deemed to be pornographic. He was prosecuted from two informants who testified that Ginsberg personally sold two 16-year-old boys the magazines containing pornographic images of women, both called "Sir", and, "Mr" Annual. It was insisted upon by their parents to buy them so they could lay the grounds for prosecution. He was tried in Nassau County District Court and found guilty. The court had found that the pictures were harmful to minors under the law.

The conviction was upheld by the Appellate Term of the Supreme Court of New York and was denied an appeal to the New York Court of Appeals.

Ginsberg argued before the court that the State of New York did not have the power to classify two different sets of the population in regards to obscene material and that it was an unconstitutional deprivation of liberty. He cited Meyer v. Nebraska, Pierce v. Society of Sisters and Prince v. Massachusetts, in all of which cases the court sided with the minors.

== Opinion of the Court ==
Justice Brennan delivered the opinion of the court. The court rejected Ginsberg's argument that New York had deprived minors of their liberty. The court found that it was well within the state's power to protect minors and that just because the material is not classified as obscene to adults it may still be regulated with minors.

== Dissent ==
Justice Douglas wrote a dissent where he strongly objected to the majority's decision. He found the First Amendment to be an absolute that harbored no exclusion for the obscenity that the rest of the court had found. While he admitted that the material that had been sold to minors could be harmful, Douglas was concerned that the ruling would set a precedent that could be perpetuated to "protect" other segments of society from anything the government might deem obscene. He finished by saying the definition of obscenity is impossible to determine because it is highly subjective and laments that the court is forced to sit as the nation's board of censors.

== See also ==
- List of United States Supreme Court cases, volume 390
- List of United States Supreme Court cases by the Warren Court
- List of United States Supreme Court cases involving the First Amendment
