= United States Telecom Association v. FCC (2004) =

Court case

USTA v. FCC
- Court: United States Court of Appeals for the District of Columbia Circuit
- Full case name: United States Telecom Association v. Federal Communications Commission and United States of America
- Decided: March 2, 2004
- Citation: 359 F.3d 554, 561-62

Court membership
- Judges sitting: Harry T. Edwards, A. Raymond Randolph, Senior Circuit Judge Stephen F. Williams

Keywords
- United States Telecom Association (USTA) FCC Regional Bell Operating Company ILEC CLEC

United States Telecom Association v. FCC, 359 F.3d 554 (D.C. Cir. 2004), is the court case in which the Washington, D.C., Circuit Court of Appeals vacated the Federal Communications Commission's Triennial Review Order (TRO). The court's decision is based on the Telecommunications Act of 1996 section 251 which defines unbundled network elements (UNEs) for incumbent local exchange carriers and competitive local exchange carriers.

Following the Court of Appeals' decision the FCC requested that the case be appealed to the Supreme Court of the United States. In June 2004 the solicitor general announced that a request for the Supreme Court to review the case would not be made. As a result of the solicitor general's decision the FCC would issue its Triennial Review Remand Order (TRRO) creating new rules and regulations for unbundled network elements.

== History ==
The Telecommunications Act of 1996 required local incumbent exchange carriers (ILECs) to maintain the availability of physical network components, or Unbundled Network Element (UNEs), for use by other telecommunication carriers, or Competitive local exchange carriers (CLECs).

The Act gave the FCC the responsibility to decide which network components would maintain availability, measuring with the standard of if "the failure to provide access to such network elements would impair the ability of the telecommunications carrier seeking access to provide the services that it seeks to offer."

In August of that year, the FCC's Report and Order identified seven Unbundled Network Elements and resulted in two unbundling models. The UNEs included:

- Local loops
- Network interface devices
- Local and tandem switching
- Interoffice transmission facilities
- Signaling networks and call related databases
- Operations support systems
- Operator services and directory assistance

The UNE-P model consisted of local loop and switching and transportation, and allowed CLECs to enter the market without investing in supporting equipment and facilities. The further Unbundled Network Element -inclusive enhanced extended loop (EEL) model allowed CLECs to serve customers more easily by using their own local and tandem switching equipment. While CLECs and new market entrants said UNE-P helped open the local telecommunications market, ILECs claimed Unbundled Network Element practices served as a heavily discounted resale of their own network elements.

Controversy that lead to the first USTA v. FCC case occurred in FCC's third Report and Order. The order required telecommunications carriers to allow law enforcement agencies access to carriers' individual phone calls and caller information, as outlined the Communications Assistance for Law Enforcement Act of 1994. In court, The FCC stated that it had "exceeded its statutory authority," and agreed to remove certain aspects of the order. The removed portions included the information accessible to law enforcement of custom calling features and dialed telephone numbers during connected phone calls.

== Triennial Review Remand Order (TRRO) ==
The Triennial Remand Order or TRRO was a response to the decision in USTA v. FCC in which the D.C. Circuit Court vacated many of the provisions set forth in the original Triennial Review Order created in 2003. In a 3–2 vote along party lines, FCC Commissioners approved the Triennial Remand Order, which was officially adopted and enacted on February 4, 2005. The Triennial Remand Order among other things discussed high capacity loops, interoffice transport, mass market local circuit switching Unbundled Network Element-P, and unbundled network elements all issues that had been discussed three times prior when trying to fulfill the sharing portion (Section 251) of the 1996 Telecommunications Act. Though it was requested that the TRRO address and grant element access to wireless carriers, the FCC found that no wireless carrier could or would be impaired by not having access to landline network elements or Unbundled Network Elements.

One of the key factors in including high capacity loops in the Triennial Remand Order is the fact that it was one of the few elements that the D.C. Circuit did not vacate in their order in USTA v. FCC. In the TRRO high capacity loops were readdressed and refined by the FCC to the point of saying that CLECs would be impaired without access to DS3 and DS1-capacity loops except in buildings and service areas with more than 60,000 lines. The FCC did make one new exception to the high capacity loop portion and that was that it found CLECs are not at a disadvantage without access to dark fiber loops in any instance and therefore removed that element from the list of things Incumbent local exchange carriers have to share.

Similar to high-capacity loops the FCC in the TRRO reevaluated how interoffice competition could be made possible between CLECs and ILECs. In the revised order the FCC determined that CLECs would only be impaired, a measure in determining access, in cases of DS3 and DS1 capacity loops in businesses that had at least 24,000 business lines. The numbers mentioned in the TRRO were important because the D.C. Circuit vacated many previous provisions by the FCC for lack of clear definitions and specific standards.

When dealing with mass market local circuit switching the Triennial Remand Order and the FCC found that ILECs would no longer have an obligation to provide CLECs unbundled access to these network elements. Mass market local circuit switching, which was considered part of the unbundled network elements platform included the unbundled loop, unbundled local circuit switching, and shared transport. The order to remove Unbundled Network Element platforms from the TRRO either forced many CLECs out of the long-distance market or forced CLECs to design and create their own platforms.

For the first time the FCC used the Triennial Review Order to address the issue of broadband access loops and sharing for CLECs This portion of the order upset many Incumbent local exchange carriers companies as it forced them in certain situations to provide broadband access loop elements [CLECs. Compared to previous FCC rulings that left a lot of decisions to individual state public utility commissions the FCC made a clear framework for the type of cases CLECs would need to present in order to access ILEC broadband access loops and prove that they would be severely impaired without it. These elements today are different as many cable companies that provide broadband access are excluded from having to share their broadband elements and access points; a result of being considered an information service rather than a telecommunications service.

The Triennial Remand Order was the fourth time that the FCC had to rewrite its own rules to fulfill Section 251 of the 1996 Telecommunications Act. In 2006 the D.C. Circuit rejected claims in Covad Communications Company et al. v. FCC, affirming the unbundling and sharing rules made by the FCC in the Triennial Remand Order . The D.C. Circuit and many other courts have since reaffirmed the decision that CLECs have to provide and demonstrate that they would be competitively impaired in order to gain access to any of the remaining unbundled network elements.

== Ruling ==
On March 2, 2004, the U.S. appeals court ruled that the FCC lacks the authority to delegate responsibility for setting those rates to the states. It ruled that the FCC had failed to prove that competitors in the local phone market are impaired without government regulated access to critical parts of the phone network controlled by the regional giants. Along with upholding the Triennial Review Order's exemption provided to incumbent carriers from unbundling for certain fiber-fed loops and for line sharing. The ruling was unanimous amongst the three judges and stated that the FCC erred by not providing unified federal guidelines, but rather pushing FCC decisions onto the states.

== Implications ==
With this ruling in place regional companies believed that the rates set by the government were too low and gave the competition an unfair advantage. A representative of SBC stated that without the regulation they would have still given competitors access to their networks, but at rates set by the market not by the government. Whereas competitors like AT&T Corp and MCI stated that without the regulated rates, they would have to get out of the local phone business in many markets because the regional companies' rates would be too high. In an article by ISP Planet, they described that the courts decision had completely changed the economics of monopolies in these markets. By forcing a regulated price on the companies the monopolistic companies are now unable to make profits because they cannot set their own rates. However this also skews the capitalist market because the rates may not be what the customer is willing to pay or lower.
