= Unbundled access =

Form of economic liberalisation

Unbundled access is an often practiced form of regulation during liberalization, where new entrants of the market (challengers) are offered access to facilities of the incumbent that are hard to duplicate (e.g. for technical or business case reasons). Its applications are mostly found in network-oriented industries (like telecommunication, mail and energy) and often concerns the last mile.

Unbundled access is similar to Bit-stream access, where the incumbent provider gives competitive access not to the actual copper wire of the local loop, but to a high-speed ADSL data connection. Both setups ensure competition for the backhaul but leave "last mile" infrastructure the responsibility of the incumbent carrier.

== Telecommunications ==
=== United States ===
In the United States, the Telecommunications Act of 1996 added a number of provisions designed to increase competition. Incumbent local exchange carriers (ILEC), under this law, are required to interconnect with competing telecommunications carriers, allowing access to individual elements of the ILEC's own network on an unbundled basis. The Telecommunications Act of 1996 provided three ways for companies to enter the new competitive telecommunications market: facilities systems, unbundled access, and resale networks.

Unbundled access is defined as "The duty to provide, to any requesting telecommunications carrier for the provision of a telecommunications service, nondiscriminatory access to network elements on an unbundled basis at any technically feasible point on rates, terms, and conditions that are just, reasonable, and nondiscriminatory in accordance with the terms and conditions of the agreement and the requirements of this section and section 252. An incumbent local exchange carrier shall provide such unbundled network elements in a manner that allows requesting carriers to combine such elements in order to provide such telecommunications service.

In 2005, after much litigation concerning its original unbundling rules, the Federal Communications Commission (FCC) made the decision to limit the number and types of unbundled elements that telecommunications carriers were required to offer competitors under the common carrier laws outlined in 47 U.S.C §§ 251. In particular the FCC removed the requirement for ILECs to unbundle Fiber-to-the–Home, and abolished line sharing as an unbundled element. Additionally, the FCC prohibited access to UNEs for the exclusive service to mobile wireless services and long distance services, and removed unbundled switching from the list of UNEs.

Pricing for unbundled access is regulated by powers granted to a State commission. A just and reasonable rate is determined on a nondiscriminatory basis and is based on cost of providing the interconnection or unbundled network element. Provisions in the legislation also allow for these pricing structures to include a reasonable profit for the provider. The failure to determine a just and reasonable rate would mean that the incumbent LEC would be unable to recover and receive a reasonable return on its costs, effectively making the incumbent LEC's shareholders subsidize entering competitors.

This option allows companies, such as cable television, wireless providers, and electric/gas utilities, who already have customers, installation and maintenance crews, and billing systems, to lease the network elements they are missing, such as voice switches or electronic ordering systems, to complete their local telephone system. The 1996 Act, thus mandates that the traditional vertical hierarchy of the telephone industry be divided into parts, known as Unbundled Network Elements (UNE), so that competitive new entrants can choose what they need to provide competitive local telecommunications service.

== Mail ==
In the United Kingdom, Downstream access (DSA) was first introduced in 2003. Mail which has been collected, sorted and distributed by a competitor (challenger), but is handed over to Royal Mail for delivery (the last mile). The ability to utilise the Royal Mail network in this way ended a 350-year monopoly.

== Energy ==
In many countries, during the liberalization of the energy market, independent Transmission system operator (in the US Independent system operators) were formed.

== See also ==
- Local loop unbundling
- Forced-access regulation
