= Vodafone Italy =

Italian telecommunications company

Vodafone Italia S.p.A.

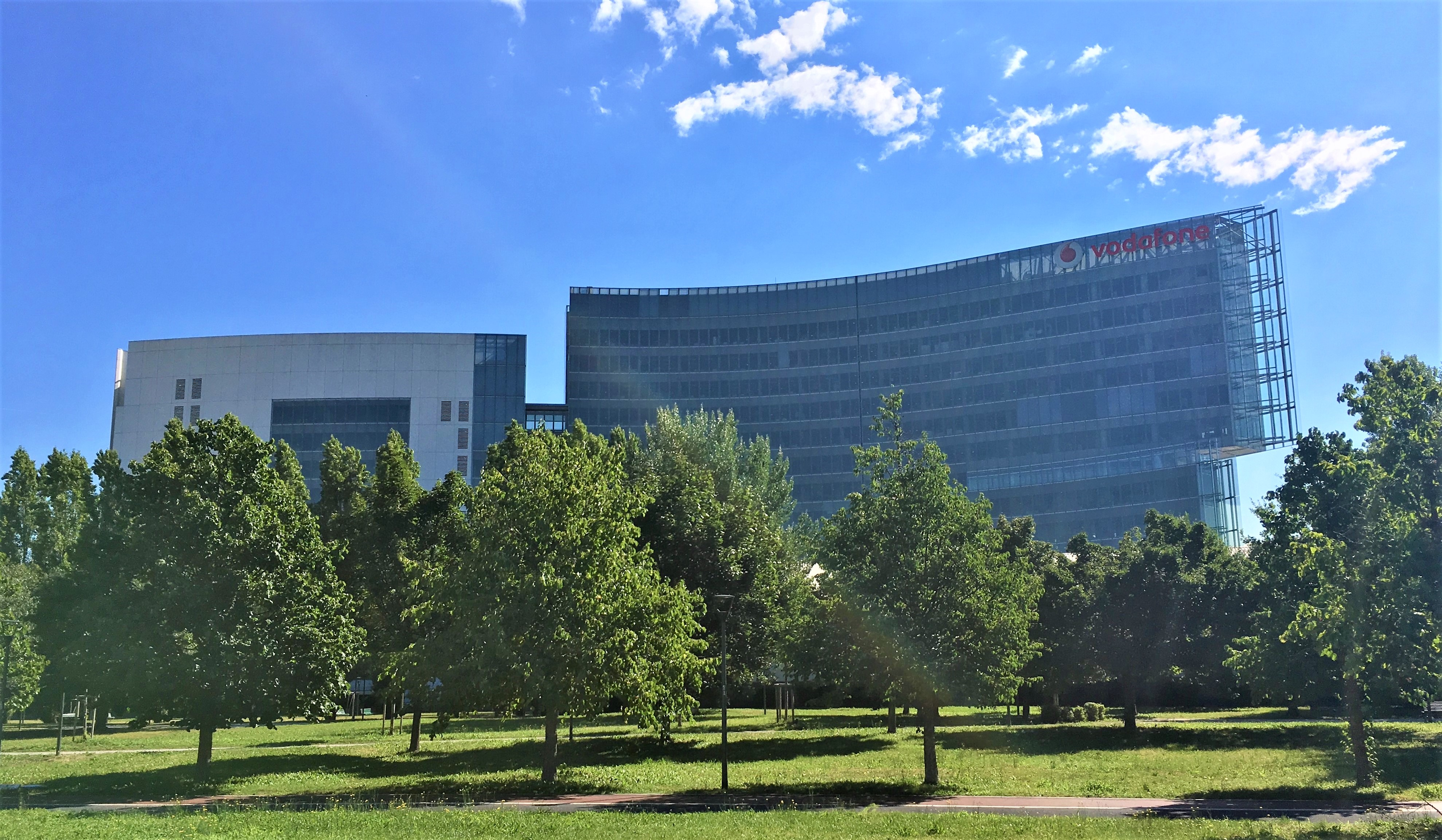
- Vodafone's headquarters in Milan, Italy.
- Formerly: Omnitel Pronto Italia S.p.A. (1994–2002); Vodafone Omnitel S.p.A. (2002–2002); Vodafone Omnitel N.V. (2002–2013); Vodafone Omnitel B.V. (2013–2015)
- Type: Subsidiary
- Industry: Telecommunications
- Founded: January 1994; 32 years ago as Omnitel
- Founder: Omnitel Sistemi Radiocellulari Italiani; Pronto Italia
- Defunct: 1 January 2026; 9 months ago
- Fate: Merged into Fastweb
- Headquarters: Ivrea and Milan, Italy
- Area served: Italy
- Key people: Aldo Bisio (CEO); Pietro Guindani (Chairman)
- Products: Mobile telephony, Fixed telephony, Internet, Television
- Brands: Ho Mobile
- Revenue: €4,727 billion (2024)
- Operating income: €408 million (2024)
- Net income: €–1,140 billion (2024)
- Total assets: €19 billion (2024)
- Total equity: €8 billion (2024)
- Owner: Omnitel Sistemi Radiocellulari Italiani and Pronto Italia (1994–2002); Vodafone Group (2002–2024); Swisscom (2024–2026)
- Number of employees: 5,043 (2024)
- Parent: Fastweb (2024–2026)
- Website: www.vodafone.it

Vodafone Italy (originally Omnitel) was an Italian telecommunications company, active between 1994 and 2025. Originally founded as Omnitel, it was part of the Vodafone Group for most of its existence. On 31 December 2024, the company was acquired by the Swiss group Swisscom for €8 billion and subsequently integrated into its Italian subsidiary, Fastweb. Following the acquisition, the combined operations began being managed under the corporate identity Fastweb + Vodafone.

On 1 January 2026, Vodafone Italia S.p.A. was legally merged into Fastweb S.p.A. and ceased to exist as a separate corporate entity. However, under a brand licensing agreement, the Vodafone brand continues to be used in the Italian market for a transitional period of five years. The company's headquarters were in Ivrea (TO) and Milan.

The company's history began in 1994 as Omnitel Pronto Italia, operating simply as Omnitel. Following the acquisition of its parent company (Mannesmann) by Vodafone in 2000, it underwent several name changes, Omnitel Vodafone (2001), Vodafone Omnitel (2002), before rebranding simply as Vodafone in 2003. Legally, the company operated as a Dutch entity (N.V./B.V.) for over a decade before repatriating its legal seat as Vodafone Italia S.p.A. in 2015.

As of March 2022, it was one of Italy's largest operators, holding 28.5% of the mobile market (30.1 million customers) and 16% of the fixed-line market (3.1 million lines), competing primarily with TIM, Wind Tre and Iliad.

== History ==
In December 1995, Omnitel Sistemi Radiocellulari Italiani (founded on 19 June 1990, by Olivetti, Lehman Brothers, Bell Atlantic, and Telia) and the Pronto Italia consortium (made up of Zignago Vetro, AirTouch, Mannesmann, Banca di Roma, Arca Merchant, Comeba, Ersel, Erg, Urmet TLC, Spal TLC, Site, Ponti Radio and Fergia) merged to form Omnitel Pronto Italia. The merged entity launched Italy's second mobile telephony service, after TIM (formerly SIP). Through Omnitel and the fixed-line operator Infostrada, majority shareholder Olivetti became the first private competitor to Telecom Italia, which until then had monopolized the entire Italian telecommunications sector.

In 1999, Olivetti sold its interest in Omnitel and Infostrada to the German conglomerate Mannesmann, after Olivetti took control of Telecom Italia. By this time, Mannesmann increased its equity stake in Omnitel to 53.7%. The following year, the Vodafone merger with Mannesmann effectively granted Vodafone control over the Italian operator. This ownership change led to a series of corporate realignments. In 2001, the company was renamed Omnitel Vodafone S.p.A., followed by Vodafone Omnitel S.p.A. in early 2002. In December 2002, a major simplification of the existing group structure took place via the merger of six companies directly or indirectly controlled by the group: Vodafone Omnitel S.p.A., Pronto Italia S.p.A., Omnitel Sistemi Radiocellulari S.p.A., Omnitel 2000 S.p.A., Oliman Holding II BV and Omnistrada BV. These entities were merged into a Dutch investment vehicle, leading to the transfer of the registered office from Ivrea to Amsterdam. Consequently, the company changed from an Italian società per azioni (S.p.A.) to a Dutch naamloze vennootschap (N.V.) named Vodafone Omnitel N.V.

In 2004, the company launched UMTS services in 140 cities. Two years later, it lso launched HSPA services.

In 2007, Vodafone bought the Italian and Spanish branches of Tele2.

Following the acquisition of Tele2 Italia (in 2010 renamed TeleTu), in 2008, Vodafone launched in Italy XDSL services, offering Wi-Fi and VoIP to its customers, and between 2013 and 2014, launched also FTTX services.

In 2012 has enabled LTE technology services in Milan and Rome.

In 2013, Vodafone acquired Verizon's 23.1% stake for $6.1 billion, gaining 100% control and converting the entity to a besloten vennootschap (B.V.).

Between 2014 and 2015, started enabling LTE-A and VoLTE services to its mobile customers, and in 2017 launched LTE-A Pro services in Milan, Palermo and Florence.

On 23 November 2015, the company moved its legal residence in Turin, returning to be a joint-stock company legally registered in Italy.

On 23 January 2017, Vodafone launched the brand Ho Mobile, to provide low-cost mobile telephony services in competition with Iliad. It was owned by Vodafone until its acquisition by Fastweb.

In 2019 launched 5G NR services in Milan, Rome, Turin, Naples and Bologna. Its GigaNetwork 5G is considered the evolution of the previous GigaNetwork 4.5G, which has been re-used to launch the 5G service.

In 2021 the company shuts down its 3G network, in order to enhance the 4G and 5G ones.

On 15 March 2024, Swisscom announced its intention to acquire 100% of Vodafone Italia for €8 billion, with the closing expected to take place in the first quarter of 2025, integrating it with its subsidiary Fastweb. As part of the agreement, Vodafone will continue to provide certain services to Fastweb, including brand licensing, for up to five years.

In September 2024, the Antitrust Authority published a notice of investigation and launched an inquiry. Swisscom announced that the European Commission had approved the acquisition of Vodafone Italia under the Foreign Subsidies Regulation. The transaction was subsequently approved by AGCOM and AGCM in November and December 2024, respectively.

In October 2024, CoopVoce signed an agreement with Vodafone to extend mobile network coverage and implement 5G.

On 15 November 2024, Sabrina Casalta, the company's Chief Financial Officer, was appointed interim CEO, replacing Aldo Bisio, who remained a non-executive board member until the completion of the transaction with Swisscom.

On 31 December 2024, the Swiss telecommunications group Swisscom finalized the acquisition of Vodafone Italia for €8 billion. Following the completion of the transaction, an integration phase commenced to merge the company with Swisscom's existing Italian subsidiary, Fastweb. During the transitional period throughout 2025, the combined entity adopted the Fastweb + Vodafone corporate identity. This unified identity served as the institutional brand for the group's governance, managed by a single Executive Committee under the leadership of CEO Walter Renna. While Fastweb + Vodafone was used for corporate and operational purposes, the individual commercial brands Vodafone, ho., and Fastweb continued to operate independently in the consumer and business markets.

The legal integration process was completed on 1 January 2026, when Vodafone Italia S.p.A. was formally merged by incorporation into Fastweb S.p.A. As a result of the merger, Vodafone Italia ceased to exist as a separate legal entity, with Fastweb assuming all its assets and obligations. Despite the legal dissolution of the company, Fastweb continues to use the Vodafone brand in Italy under a five-year licensing agreement from the Vodafone Group.

== Brand identity ==
Evolution of the company brand and logo:

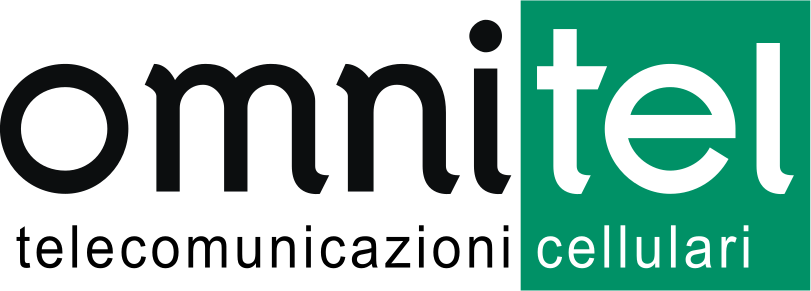
1994–1996

1996–2001

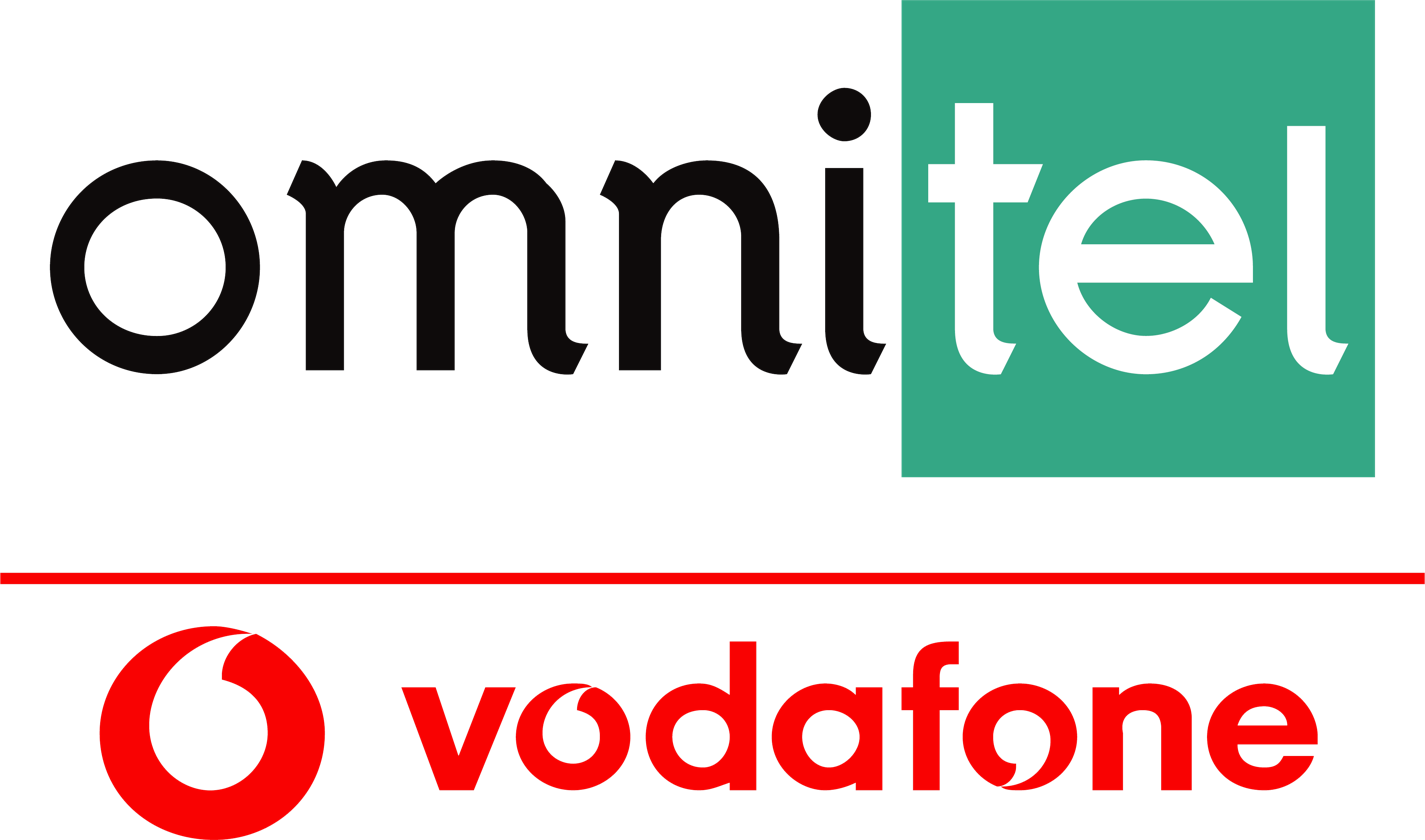
2001–2002

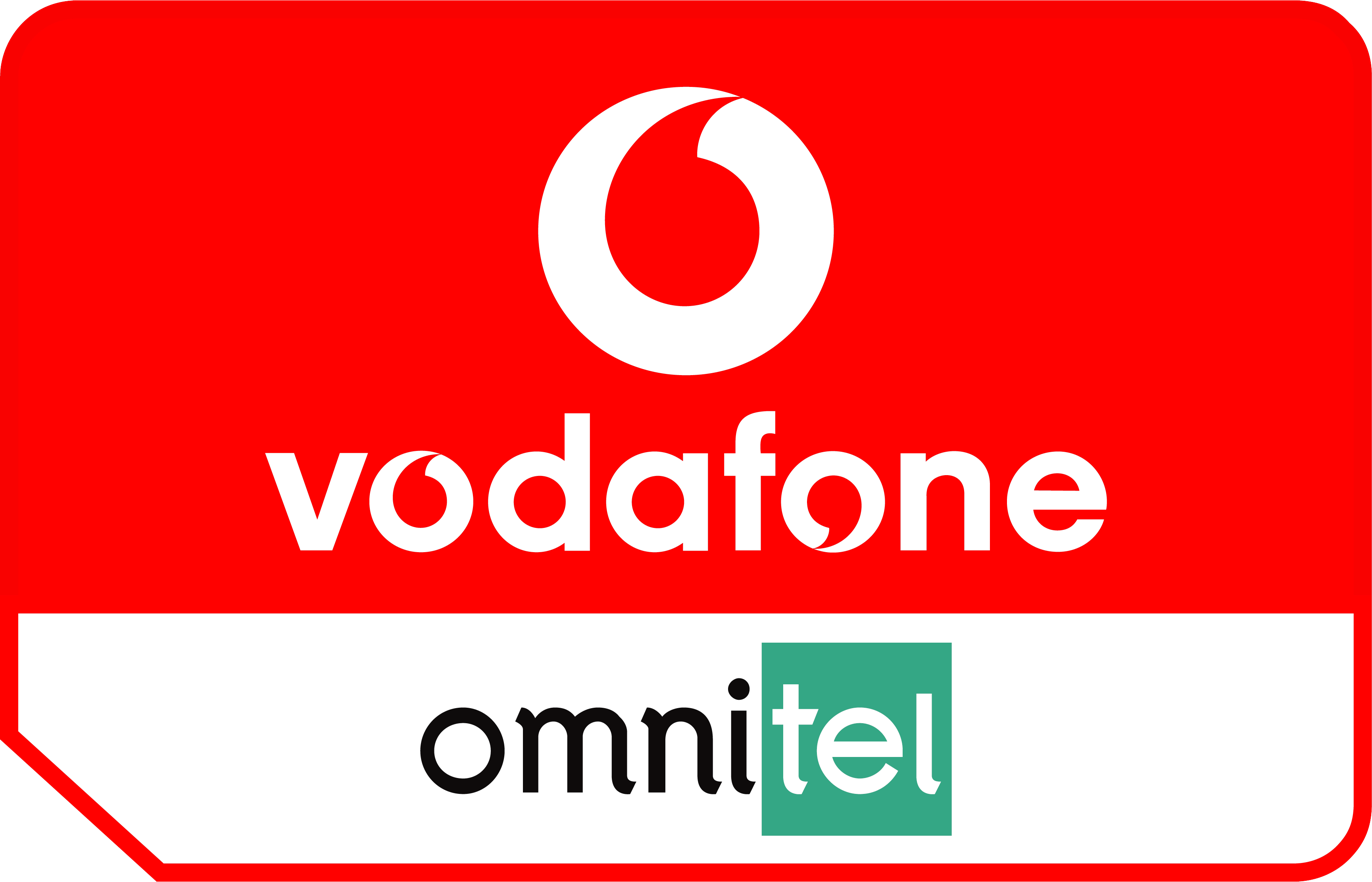
2002–2003

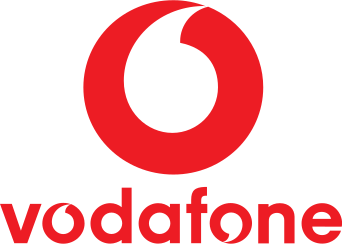
2003–2006

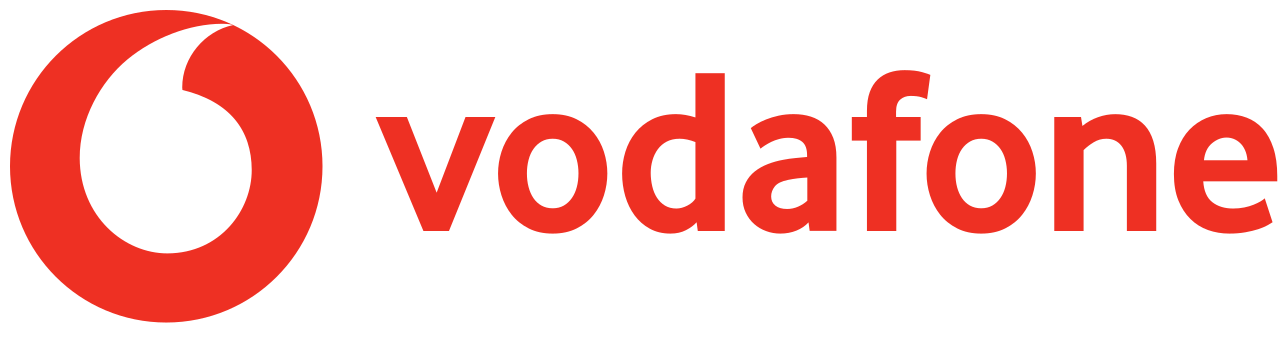
2017–present
- In 1994 the company debuted on the market with the Omnitel brand.
- In 2001, following the takeover of Vodafone Group as shareholder, the brand became Omnitel Vodafone.
- In 2002 the brand was changed to Vodafone Omnitel, to symbolize the progressive transition from Omnitel to Vodafone.
- In 2003, the Omnitel brand was definitively abandoned in favor of Vodafone.

== Network and coverage ==
=== Mobile network ===
As of 31 March 2022 Vodafone Italy's mobile network is made from 21,785 physical sites, including:

- 21,000 base transceiver stations LTE (4G);
- 1,300 base transceiver stations NR (5G).

The national mobile network covers:

Network	Full Speed		Coverage		System		Update
Network	Download ↓	Upload ↑	Cities	Population (%)	Technology	Frequencies used	Update
2G	474 kbit/s			99.8%	GSM / GPRS / EDGE	900 MHz	March 2022
4G	150 Mbit/s	50 Mbit/s	7,627	99.0%	LTE	700/800/900/1500/ 1800/2100/2600 MHz	March 2022
4G	225 Mbit/s	50 Mbit/s	4,000		LTE-A/LTE-A Pro	700/800/900/1500/ 1800/2100/2600 MHz	March 2020
5G	1.8 Gbit/s	75 Mbit/s	60		NR	2100/3700 MHz	March 2022

==== International roaming ====
Vodafone Italy has signed international roaming agreements with 731 operators in 241 countries. As of 30 June 2016, about 150 of these operators in 100 countries allow customers to reach 4G LTE coverage.

=== Fixed network ===
Vodafone Italy's fixed network includes 1,254 sites ULL, 326 sites SLU and 19,000 ONU (cabinet) in fiber-optic (FTTC).

Technology	Full Speed		Coverage	Typology	Update
Technology	Download ↓	Upload ↑	Coverage	Typology	Update
ADSL	20 Mbit/s	1 Mbit/s		WLR	
ADSL2+	20 Mbit/s	1 Mbit/s	52% of the population	ULL	
FTTC (VDSL2)	100 Mbit/s	20 Mbit/s	102 cities	VULA	November 2018
FTTC (E-VDSL)	200 Mbit/s	20 Mbit/s	2,328 cities	SLU	May 2019
FTTH	2.5 Gbit/s	500 Mbit/s	130 cities (on Open Fiber's network)	GPON	May 2021

== Customers ==
=== Mobile telephony ===
▼18.17 million mobile lines (for a market share of 23.3%)

▼14.69 million consumer mobile lines (21.6%) and ▼3.43 million business mobile lines (34.4%)
▼15.43 million prepaid mobile lines (22.3%) and ▲2.71 million subscription mobile lines (30.7%)

=== Fixed telephony ===
▲3.18 million of total fixed lines (for a market share of 16%)

▼447.400 fixed broadband lines (for a market share of 10.1%)
▲2.60 million fixed ultra-broadband lines (for a market share of 18%)

=== M2M ===
▲11.98 million SIM (of which 47% is used in applications of info-mobility and Smart card)

== See also ==
- Fastweb
- Swisscom
- TeleTu
- Vodafone Group
- Verizon
