= Verizon Communications Inc. v. Federal Communications Commission =

Verizon Communications Inc. v. Federal Communications Commission may refer to:

- Verizon Communications Inc. v. FCC (2002), a 2002 United States Supreme Court case
- Verizon Communications Inc. v. FCC (2014), a 2014 United States Court of Appeals for the District of Columbia case
