= Sub-loop unbundling =

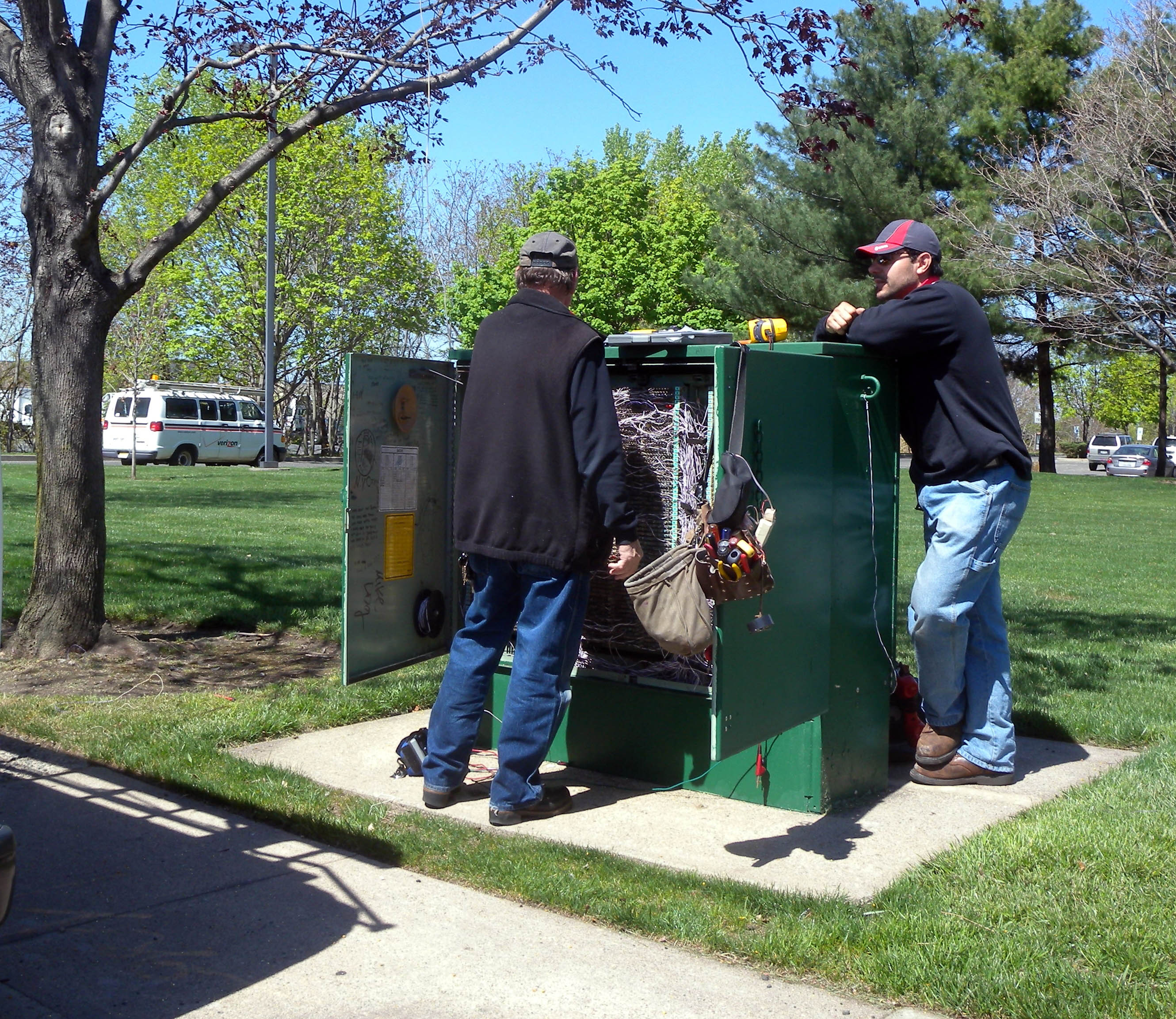
Street cabinet (serving area interface) where services may be connected

In the telephony business, sub-loop unbundling (SLU) is a type of unbundled access whereby a sub-section of the local loop is unbundled. To increase market competition and consumer choice, government regulators may "unbundle" services by requiring a company that owns local telephone lines to allow other companies to connect their own equipment to those lines in street cabinets close to the homes of potential customers (sub-loops).

In practice this often means the competitor placing a small street cabinet with a DSLAM, next to a telco local copper aggregation cabinet or serving area interface and using a "tie cable" to connect to the last part of the local loop into customers' homes. The village of Lyddington in the rural county of Rutland was the first example of SLU in the UK when local provider Rutland Telecom unbundled the cabinet to offer VDSL broadband.

== Advantages ==
The short range brings superior bit-rate performance, compared to normal local loop unbundling (LLU). The local loop can be accessed using shared metallic path or full metallic path facilities. In the latter, which was first deployed in the UK in rural villages by Rutland Telecom, the telco loses remote access to the part of the local loop between the cabinet and the customer's premises unless the SLU Operator allows IP-level access via their DSLAM.

The street cabinet is connected to a point of presence on the national network using long-range wireless or fibre. Where fibre is used, the technology is often referred to as fibre to the cabinet (FTTC).

Where VDSL or VDSL2 is used to deliver a service, competing SLU operators at the same site must adhere to tie cable length limitations to prevent interference. Other restrictions are in force to prevent interference with ADSL or ADSL2+ frequencies on the local loop from the serving exchange. In the UK the incumbent telco aggregation cabinets are known as Primary Connection Points (PCPs) and each one is assigned a CAL (Cabinet Assigned Loss) value based on its distance from the serving exchange.
