= United States Telecom Association v. Federal Communications Commission =

United States Telecom Association v. Federal Communications Commission may refer to:

- United States Telecom Association v. FCC (2004), 359 F.3d 554 (D.C. Cir. 2004)
- United States Telecom Association v. FCC (2016), 825 F.3d 674 (D.C. Cir. 2016)
