= Verizon Communications Inc. v. FCC (2002) =

Verizon Communications Inc. v. Federal Communications Commission
- Supreme Court of the United States

Argued October 10, 2001 Decided May 13, 2002
- Full case name: Verizon Communications Inc., et al. v. Federal Communications Commission, et al.; WorldCom, Inc., et al. v. Verizon Communications Inc., et al.; Federal Communications Commission, et al. v. Iowa Utilities Board, et al.; AT&T Corporation v. Iowa Utilities Board, et al.; General Communications, Inc. v. Iowa Utilities Board, et al.
- Citations: 535 U.S. 467 (more) 122 S. Ct. 1646; 152 L. Ed. 2d 701; 2002 U.S. LEXIS 3559; 70 U.S.L.W. 4396; 2002 Cal. Daily Op. Service 4078; 2002 Daily Journal DAR 5139; 15 Fla. L. Weekly Fed. S 233

Holding
- Affirmed in part, reversed in part, and remanded. The FCC can require state commissions to set the rates charged by incumbents for leased elements on a forward-looking basis untied to the incumbents’ investment

Court membership
- Chief Justice William Rehnquist Associate Justices John P. Stevens · Sandra Day O'Connor; Antonin Scalia · Anthony Kennedy; David Souter · Clarence Thomas; Ruth Bader Ginsburg · Stephen Breyer

Case opinions
- Majority: Souter, joined by Rehnquist, Stevens, Kennedy, Ginsburg; Scalia, Thomas (part III); Thomas (part IV)
- Concur/dissent: Breyer, joined by Scalia (part VI)
- O'Connor took no part in the consideration or decision of the case.

Verizon Communications Inc. v. Federal Communications Commission, 535 U.S. 467 (2002), is a United States Supreme Court case in which Verizon Communications argued that the FCC had an unreasonable way for setting rates for leasing network elements. It held that the FCC can require state commissions to set the rates charged by incumbents for leased elements on a forward-looking basis untied to the incumbents' investment and that the FCC can require incumbents to combine elements of their networks at the request of entrants.

== Background ==
The Telecommunications Act of 1996 left the FCC freedom to define the standard for leasing rates with very few details. This led to Verizon questioning if the FCC is authorized to be able to require state utility commissions to set the rates charged by the incumbents for leased elements.

The court focused on three main issues, which were the FCC's pricing rules for these unbundled network elements, also whether the exclusion of historical costs in the pricing rules constitutes a governmental taking, and lastly, various rules for combining network elements. It focused primarily on the economic implications of the FCC's costing standards which the Court upheld and secondarily on the takings claim.

=== Telecommunications Act of 1996 ===
The Telecommunications Act of 1996 allows the FCC the ability to require state utility commissions to set rates charged by incumbent local exchange carriers for lease of network elements to competitive local exchange carriers on a forward-looking basis, untied to the incumbents' historical or past investments. The methodology of doing this by the FCC is not inconsistent with the act therefore is reasonable.

The Act contains unbundled access obligations of local exchange carriers:

The duty to provide, to any requesting telecommunications carrier for the provision of a telecommunications service, nondiscriminatory access to network elements on an unbundled basis at any technically feasible point on rates, terms, and conditions that are just, reasonable, and nondiscriminatory in accordance with the terms and conditions of the agreement and the requirements of this section and section 252. An incumbent local exchange carrier shall provide such unbundled network elements in a manner that allows requesting carriers to combine such elements in order to provide such telecommunications service.

=== Pricing network elements ===
The historical cost is the cost of using long-lived assets in any given period which depends on the original costs of assets. In the telecommunications industry these have the trend of dropping over time due to technological innovation and progress. This cost calculating method may then overstate the current long run marginal cost which is why, in contrast, the FCC uses a "forward-looking" cost, referred to as Total Long Run Incremental Cost, or TELRIC, which uses current replacement costs instead of the original cost in its methodology.

Under the Telecommunications Act, Bell Operating Companies, which includes Verizon, have the incentive to unbundle their elements. If conditions are met, elements that are unbundled need not be offered at TELRIC and prices only need to avoid being "unjust, unreasonable, or unreasonably discriminatory." Enough interconnection, unbundling and resale agreements with the companies can foster competition.

== Opinion of the Court ==
=== Arguments ===
The case was decided in an opinion written by Justice David Souter. The Respondent, the Federal Communications Commission (FCC), received six out of eight votes with Justices Stephen Breyer and Antonin Scalia dissenting.

In the certiorari from the Supreme Court to the Appeal court they state, “In order to foster competition between monopolistic carriers providing local telephone service and companies seeking to enter local markets provisions of the Telecommunications Act of 1996 entitle the new entrants to lease elements of the incumbent carriers local-exchange networks”. In five separate cases they argued over the FCC's regulations though ultimately the Court of Appeals held that the use of the TELRIC methodology was foreclosed because the Act plainly required rates based on the actual cost of providing the network element and invalidated certain combination rules.

=== Majority opinion ===
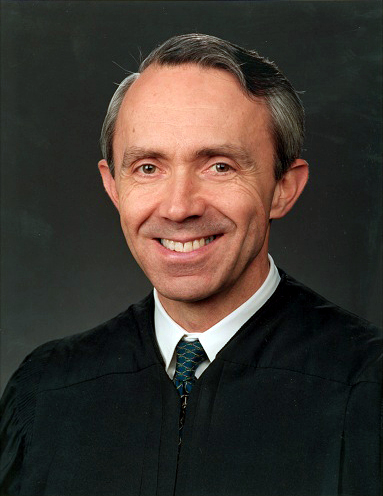
Associate Justice David Souter, author of majority opinion

These cases arise under the Telecommunications Act of 1996. Each is about the power of the Federal Communications Commission to regulate a relationship between monopolistic companies providing local telephone service and companies entering local markets to compete with the incumbents. Under the Act, the new entrants are entitled, among other things, to lease elements of the local telephone networks from the incumbent monopolists. The issues are whether the FCC is authorized (1) to require state utility commissions to set the rates charged by the incumbents for leased elements on a forward-looking basis untied to the incumbents’ investment, and (2) to require incumbents to combine such elements at the entrants’ request when they lease them to the entrants. We uphold the FCC’s assumption and exercise of authority on both issues… The 1996 Act sought to bring competition to local-exchange markets, in part by requiring incumbent local-exchange carriers to lease elements of their networks at rates that would attract new entrants when it would be more efficient to lease than to build or resell. Whether the FCC picked the best way to set these rates is the stuff of debate for economists and regulators versed in the technology of telecommunications and microeconomic pricing theory. The job of judges is to ask whether the Commission made choices reasonably within the pale of statutory possibility in deciding what and how items must be leased and the way to set rates for leasing them. The FCC’s pricing and additional combination rules survive that scrutiny. The judgment of the Court of Appeals is reversed in part and affirmed in part, and the cases are remanded for further proceedings consistent with this opinion. It is so ordered.

— Justice Souter, page 2 and 68 of court's opinion

=== Dissenting opinion ===
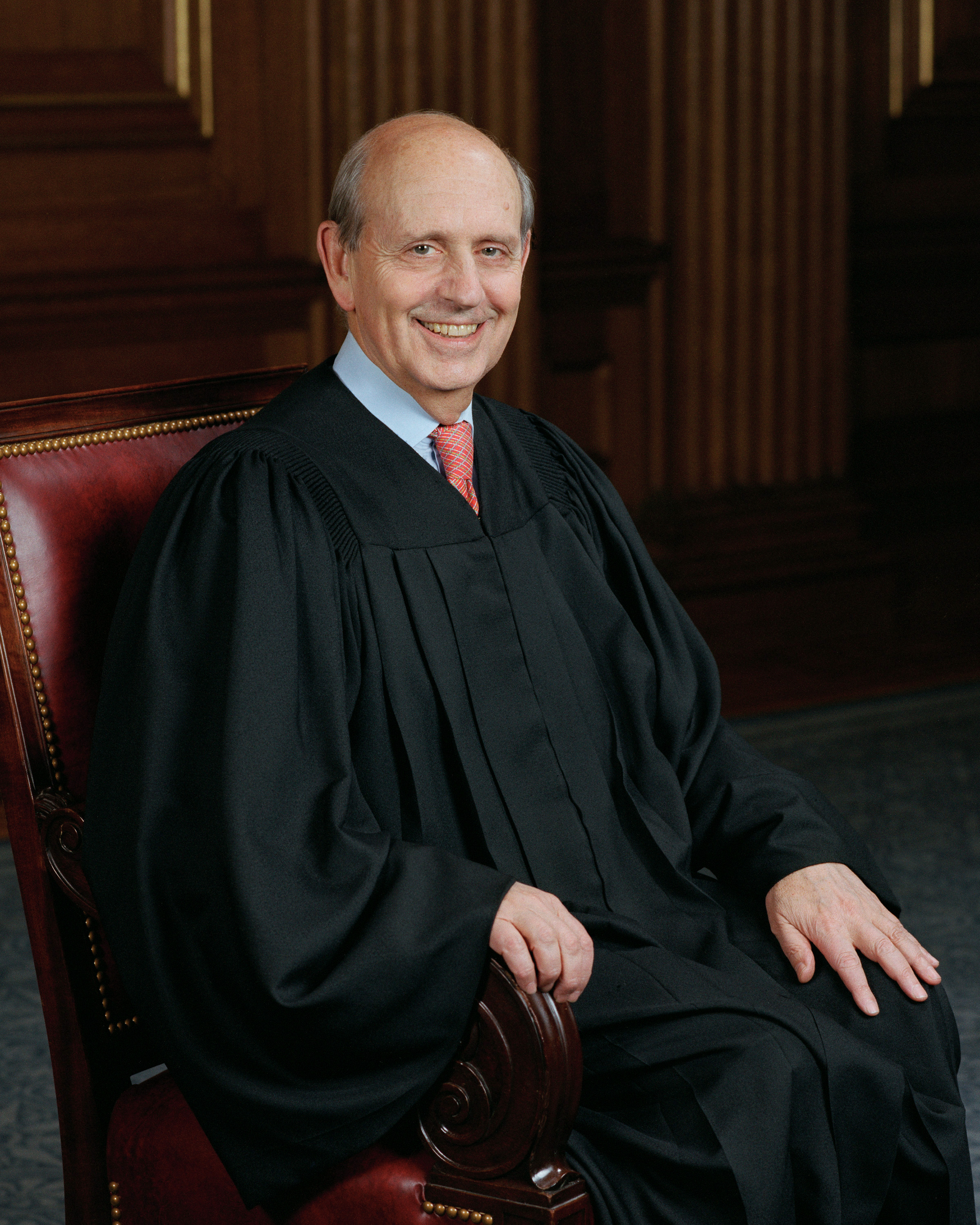
Associate Justice Stephen Breyer, author of dissenting opinion

I agree with the majority that the Telecommunications Act of 1996 (Act or Telecommunications Act), 47 U. S. C. §251 et seq. (1994 ed. and Supp. V), does not require a historical cost pricing system. I also agree that, at the present time, no taking of the incumbent firms’ property in violation of the Fifth Amendment has occurred. I disagree, however, with the Court’s conclusion that the specific pricing and unbundling rules at issue here are authorized by the Act… I cannot find the statutory authority. And I consequently would affirm the lower court on the point. For these reasons, I dissent.

— Justice Breyer, page 1, 2, 26, and 27 of dissenting opinion

== Subsequent developments ==

While this decision maintains the status quo, the FCC is currently looking at its unbundled network element policies, recognizing that a 'course correction' -- as noted by Chairman Powell -- may be necessary to encourage facilities-based competition as the Telecom Act intended. We hope that the chairman will not follow the bankrupt policies of the past but will provide leadership on this issue. While the court upheld TELRIC methodology as a legal matter, that does not mean this is the best policy for consumers or for the telecommunications industry at large.

— John P. Frantz, vice president and counselor to the general counsel for Verizon Communications.

The following are other press releases by Verizon that relate to the case decision.

- Feb. 19, 2003: Verizon claims that "rather than bringing stability, certainty and clarity to the regulatory structure for the industry, the commission left a void and handed off the decision-making to the states. This is a recipe for continued disarray in the industry and more litigation."
- Feb. 23, 2003: "Verizon Chief Executive Officer Ivan Seidenberg today told financial analysts that the FCC's policies are flawed both legally and as a sustainable business model for creating competition."

=== In the news ===
Verizon Wireless "Rule the Air" Ad Campaign

In 2010 Verizon Wireless launched its latest advertising campaign creating the new tagline "Rule The Air." The campaign boasts Verizon's superior ability in its 4G network to "send a strong signal."

While Verizon Wireless would like to "rule the air," as this ads suggest, the carrier, along with AT&T, must instead share the air, ruled by the Federal Communications Commission ... to create data-roaming agreements, ensuring all Americans have access to mobile e-mail and Internet services.

=== Relevant cases ===
Verizon Communications v. Law Offices of Curtis V. Trinko, LLP

- The Sherman Antitrust Act and requirements of telecommunications companies under the Telecommunications Act of 1996

Consumer.net and Russ Smith v. Verizon et al.

- The FCC found only one violation of the commission's rules and the Communications Act. This violation related to the failure of Verizon New Jersey to record a company-specific DNCL request made by Smith in September 2003. The rest of the complaints were dismissed.

Four cases included in the same certiorari where parties challenged FCC regulations are:

- WorldCom, Inc., et al. v. Verizon Communications Inc. et al.
- Federal Communications Commission et al. v. Iowa Utilities Board et al.
- AT&T v. Iowa Utilities Board
- General Communications, Inc. v. Iowa Utilities Board et al.

=== Law reviews ===
- Entry Policy in Local Telecommunications: Iowa Utilities and Verizon

This article draws on the Supreme Court decision in Verizon to argue that the intersection of ambiguous telecommunication access statues and the limits on judicial review as a result of the separation of powers and the application of Chevron U. S. A. Inc. v. Natural Resources Defense Council, Inc., mean that administrative law has become an ineffective tool in ensuring the accountability of telecommunications regulators…This article argues for Congress to address pricing in greater detail.

- Verizon Communications, Inc. v. FCC: Telecommunications Access Pricing and Regulator Accountability through Administrative Law and Takings Jurisprudence

Similarly, while we think the Court made some missteps in the Iowa Utilities and Verizon, overall the Court’s analysis in both of these cases strikes us as reasonable and likely even right. The economic issues at the core of these cases were complicated and at times ambiguous, and the Court in out view exercised good judgment in deciding when to wade into the morass and when to defer to technical issues to the Commission. Out purpose of this article, then, is not to criticize either the Commission of the Court. Instead we, we set out her to move the analysis forward…

== See also ==
- Sprint Communications, Inc. v. Jacobs
