= Total element long run incremental cost =

Calculation method for US telephony expenses

Total element long-run incremental cost (TELRIC) is a calculation method that the United States Federal Communications Commission (FCC) requires incumbent local exchange carriers (ILECs) to use to charge competitive local exchange carriers (CLECs) for interconnection and colocation, effectively imposing a price ceiling. A variant of long-run incremental cost (LRIC), it "measures the forward-looking incremental cost of adding or subtracting a network element" from a hypothetical system (that is efficient and uses current technologies). This allows the incumbent to recover a share of the fair value of their inputs in the long run.

The FCC used the telecommunications term for the first time when it interpreted TELRIC's role under the 1996 Telecommunications Act, which had been based on a higher level of ILEC unbundling. In short, the act assumed that "ILECs would have to lease components of the local telephone network to prospective competitors", who would then "expect to blend these components together, possibly using their own elements to offer appropriate services to end users".

TELRIC pricing is not without controversy, as some economists have argued that TELRIC prices reduce the incentives of ILECs and CLECs to make investments in existing facilities and new technologies.
