= City of Los Angeles v. Alameda Books, Inc. =

Los Angeles v. Alameda Books, Inc.
- Supreme Court of the United States

Argued December 4, 2001 Decided May 13, 2002
- Full case name: City of Los Angeles v. Alameda Books, Inc., et al.
- Citations: 535 U.S. 425 (more) 122 S. Ct. 1728; 152 L. Ed. 2d 670; 2002 U.S. LEXIS 3424; 70 U.S.L.W. 4369; 30 Media L. Rep. 1769; 2002 Cal. Daily Op. Service 4067; 2002 Daily Journal DAR 5167; 15 Fla. L. Weekly Fed. S 267

Holding
- Los Angeles may reasonably rely on its 1977 study to demonstrate that its present ban on multiple use adult establishments serves its interest in reducing crime.

Court membership
- Chief Justice William Rehnquist Associate Justices John P. Stevens · Sandra Day O'Connor; Antonin Scalia · Anthony Kennedy; David Souter · Clarence Thomas; Ruth Bader Ginsburg · Stephen Breyer

Case opinions
- Plurality: O'Connor, joined by Rehnquist, Scalia, Thomas
- Concurrence: Scalia
- Concurrence: Kennedy (in judgment)
- Dissent: Souter, joined by Stevens, Ginsburg; Breyer (Part II)

Los Angeles v. Alameda Books, Inc., 535 U.S. 425 (2002), was a United States Supreme Court case on the controversial issue of adult bookstore zoning in the city of Los Angeles. Zoning laws dictated that no adult bookstores could be within five hundred feet of a public park, or religious establishment, or within 1000 feet of another adult establishment. However, Alameda Books, Inc. and Highland Books, Inc. were two adult stores that operated under one roof. They sued Los Angeles, stating the ordinance violated the First Amendment. The district court concurred with the stores, stating that the 1977 study stating there was a higher crime rate in areas with adult stores, which the law was based upon, did not support a reasonable belief that multiple-use adult establishments produce the secondary effects the city asserted as content-neutral justifications for its restrictions on adult stores. The Court of Appeals upheld this verdict, and found that even if the ordinance were content neutral, the city failed to present evidence upon which it could reasonably rely to demonstrate that its regulation of multiple-use establishments was designed to serve its substantial interest in reducing crime. However, the Supreme Court ruled in favor of the city. This reversed the decision of the lower court. This case was argued on December 4, 2001; certiorari was granted on March 5, 2001. "City of Los Angeles v. Alameda Books, 00-799, didn't involve the kind of adult material that can be regulated by the government, but rather the extent to which cities can ban "one-stop shopping" sex-related businesses."

== Background ==
In 1977, the city of Los Angeles conducted a study regarding the effects of high concentrations of adult stores. At that time 26 adult bookstores and 21 adult movie theatres flourished in the Hollywood area alone. Downtown L.A. had 23 stores within a 3 block radius. Other businesses began to flee the area and property values plummeted, though Justice Souter noted that the study conducted by the city "found no certain correlation between the location of those establishments and depressed property values".

Passersby were subject to sexually explicit material through advertisements for these businesses.

Drug transactions were also prevalent in these areas, and the narcotics trade gave way to a 16 percent increase in part 1 crime in the Hollywood area, while there was a 5 percent decrease city-wide. Such crimes include, murder, rape, aggravated assault, robbery, burglary, larceny, and vehicle theft. There was also a 45 percent increase in part 2 crimes in Hollywood which includes, other assaults, forgery, counterfeiting, embezzlement, fraud, stolen property, prostitution, narcotics, liquor violations, gambling, and other miscellaneous misdemeanors. Meanwhile, there was a 3 percent decrease citywide. "[The City] concluded that concentrations of adult businesses are associated with higher rates of prostitution, robbery, assaults, and thefts in surrounding communities. Accordingly, the city enacted an ordinance prohibiting the establishment, substantial enlargement, or transfer of ownership of an adult arcade, bookstore, cabaret, motel, theater, or massage parlor or a place for sexual encounters within 1,000 feet of another such enterprise or within 500 feet of any religious institution, school, or public park. [Later, the city realized that its method of calculating distances created a loophole permitting the concentration of multiple adult enterprises in a single structure.]" In response, Los Angeles enacted 12.70(C), the zoning law which dealt with the problem.

"The issue is whether, in such a case, the City Council can rely on the fact that the Fourth Circuit examined and upheld a state law almost identical to the Los Angeles ordinance, or whether a study or other evidence is required demonstrating that a combination adult bookstore/arcade standing alone produces harmful secondary effects. An amicus brief, which brought to the Court's attention the broadening scope of adult business zoning so that mainstream businesses are often regulated, was filed in August 2001 on behalf of the American Booksellers Foundation for Free Expression, Feminists for Free Expression, the Freedom to Read Foundation, the International Periodical Distributors Association, the Publishers Marketing Association and the Video Software Dealers Association."

"The two plaintiffs operated their adult businesses from the same location. Both sold adult print media and operated an "adult arcade." In 1995, after a city inspector informed both parties that they were violating the ordinance, they sued, claiming that enforcing the ordinance would violate their First Amendment rights."

== Summary Of Plurality Opinion ==
In a plurality opinion delivered by Justice Sandra Day O'Connor, the Court ruled that "the city of Los Angeles may reasonably rely on the 1977 study when enacting the present version of section 12.70(C) to demonstrate that its ban on multiple-use adult establishments serves its interest in reducing crime. Three other Justices joined in this holding. Concurring, Justice Anthony M. Kennedy concluded that Los Angeles may impose its regulation in the exercise of the zoning authority, and that the city is not, at least, to be foreclosed by summary judgment. Justice David H. Souter, with whom Justices John Paul Stevens, Ruth Bader Ginsburg, and Stephen G. Breyer joined, dissented. Justice Souter argued that the 1977 study, while pursuing a policy of dispersing adult establishments, evolved to a policy of breaking-up combined bookstores/video arcades, for which the study's evidence was insufficient." "The plurality wrote that 'the Los Angeles City Council is in a better position than the Judiciary to gather and evaluate data on local problems.'" "The issue in this case is the district court's grant of summary judgment against the City of Los Angeles on the grounds that the City's Ordinance for the dispersal of adult entertainment businesses violates the First Amendment. We reverse. The district court erred by granting summary judgment on the issue whether the plaintiffs had presented "actual and convincing" evidence "casting doubt" on the city's rationale for its Ordinance."

== Concurrence ==
Justices Scalia, and Kennedy wrote concurring opinions. Scalia stated "I join the plurality opinion because I think it represents a correct application of our jurisprudence concerning regulation of the "secondary effects" of pornographic speech. As I have said elsewhere, however, in a case such as this our First Amendment traditions make "secondary effects" analysis quite unnecessary. The Constitution does not prevent those communities that wish to do so from regulating, or indeed entirely suppressing, the business of pandering sex." Kennedy said "Speech can produce tangible consequences. It can change minds. It can prompt actions. These primary effects signify the power and the necessity of free speech. Speech can also cause secondary effects, however, unrelated to the impact of the speech on its audience. A newspaper factory may cause pollution, and a billboard may obstruct a view. These secondary consequences are not always immune from regulation by zoning laws even though they are produced by speech. Municipal governments know that high concentrations of adult businesses can damage the value and the integrity of a neighborhood. The damage is measurable; it is all too real. The law does not require a city to ignore these consequences if it uses its zoning power in a reasonable way to ameliorate them without suppressing speech. A city's "interest in attempting to preserve the quality of urban life is one that must be accorded high respect...""

== Dissenting opinion ==
A dissenting opinion was authored by Justice Souter, who stated, "In 1977, the city of Los Angeles studied sections of the city with high and low concentrations of adult business establishments catering to the market for the erotic. The city found no certain correlation between the location of those establishments and depressed property values, but it did find some correlation between areas of higher concentrations of such business and higher crime rates. On that basis, Los Angeles followed the examples of other cities in adopting a zoning ordinance requiring dispersion of adult establishments. I assume that the ordinance was constitutional when adopted, and assume for purposes of this case that the original ordinance remains valid today. The city subsequently amended its ordinance to forbid clusters of such businesses at one address, as in a mall. The city has, in turn, taken a third step to apply this amendment to prohibit even a single proprietor from doing business in a traditional way that combines an adult bookstore, selling books, magazines, and videos, with an adult arcade, consisting of open viewing booths, where potential purchasers of videos can view them for a fee." Souter goes on to argue that businesses at one address are not in violation of the original intent of the law. He goes on to say "My concern is not with the assumption behind the amendment itself, that a conglomeration of adult businesses under one roof, as in a minimal or adult department store, will produce undesirable secondary effects comparable to what a cluster of separate adult establishments brings about, ante, at 8. That may or may not be so. The assumption that is clearly unsupported, however, goes to the city's supposed interest in applying the amendment to the book and video stores in question, and in applying it to break them up."

== Historical significance ==
This case was significant because it stated limits on freedom of speech. Kennedy drew a line stating that the effects of freedom of speech are not protected by the first amendment, creating an analogy between newspaper factories causing pollution. Such a company certainly has the right to print newspapers; however they must succumb to the environmental laws. The same is true here; these stores have a right to conduct business; however when a law is passed relating to the secondary effects of their commerce, adult business is subject to obey such a zoning ordinance. "It is questionable whether some types of establishments, especially those that are adult-oriented, enjoy the First Amendment's full protection. Allegedly, a lesser extent of protection applies when city governments, acting within their zoning powers, inhibit the prosperity of these businesses by limiting their choice of location, hours, and modes of operation. City governments are fully entitled to restrict the free use of land if the regulation is justified by "some aspect of the police ..."
