= Holmes Group, Inc. v. Vornado Air Circulation Systems, Inc. =

- Supreme Court of the United States

Argued March 19, 2002 Decided June 3, 2002
- Full case name: Holmes Group, Inc. v. Vornado Air Circulation Systems, Inc.
- Docket no.: 01-408
- Citations: 535 U.S. 826 (more)
- Argument: Oral argument
- Opinion announcement: Opinion announcement

Case history
- Prior: 13 F. App'x 961 (Fed. Cir. 2001).

Questions presented
- Does the Court of Appeals for the Federal Circuit have appellate jurisdiction over a case in which the complaint does not allege a claim arising under federal patent law, but the answer contains a patent-law counterclaim?

Holding
- Patent issues raised in a counterclaim do not give rise to Federal Circuit jurisdiction.

Court membership
- Chief Justice William Rehnquist Associate Justices John P. Stevens · Sandra Day O'Connor; Antonin Scalia · Anthony Kennedy; David Souter · Clarence Thomas; Ruth Bader Ginsburg · Stephen Breyer

Case opinions
- Majority: Scalia, joined by Rehnquist, Kennedy, Souter, Thomas, Breyer; Stevens (Parts I and II-A)
- Concurrence: Stevens (in part and in judgment)
- Concurrence: Ginsburg (in judgment), joined by O'Connor
- Superseded by
- America Invents Act (2011)

Holmes Group, Inc. v. Vornado Air Circulation Systems, Inc., 535 U.S. 826 (2002), is a United States Supreme Court case in which the court held that patent issues raised in a counterclaim do not give rise to Federal Circuit jurisdiction.

== Background ==
Created by an act of Congress in 1982, the United States Court of Appeals for the Federal Circuit is a United States court of appeals that exercises exclusive appellate jurisdiction over specific types of federal cases. This includes, among others, federal cases arising from patents and trademarks.

Vornado Air Circulation Systems is a Kansas-based manufacturer of patented fans and heaters. In 1992, Vornado sued Duracraft Corporation (a competitor) claiming that they had infringed upon Vornado's trade dress. On appeal, the United States Court of Appeals for the Tenth Circuit found for Duracraft, holding that Vornado held no protectable trade dress rights to the design element in question. Despite the Tenth Circuit's ruling, Vornado filed a complaint in November 1999 with the United States International Trade Commission against The Holmes Group claiming infringement upon the same trade dress. Later that year, Holmes filed a suit against Vornado in the United States District Court for the District of Kansas. Holmes's suit sought, among other things, a declaratory judgment that its products did not infringe upon Vornado's trade dress, and an injunction preventing Vornado from alleging trade dress infringement in advertising materials. Vornado's answer to Holmes asserted a compulsory counterclaim. The District Court granted Holmes the declaratory judgment and injunction it sought. The Court explained that the collateral estoppel effect of Vornado v. Duracraft precluded Vornado from relitigating its trade dress claim. Additionally, it rejected Vornado's argument that an intervening Federal Circuit case, which disagreed with the 10th Circuit's reasoning in the Duracraft case, constituted a change in the law of trade dress that warranted relitigation of Vornado's trade-dress claim.

Vornado appealed to the United States Court of Appeals for the Federal Circuit. Despite Holmes's challenges to the Court's jurisdiction, the Court vacated the District Court's judgment and remanded for consideration of whether the "change of law" exception to collateral estoppel applied in light of a separate Supreme Court case, TrafFix Devices, Inc. v. Marketing Displays, Inc., decided after the District Court's judgment which settled a circuit split regarding the Duracraft and Midwest Industries cases.

== Supreme Court ==
On November 8, 2001, the Supreme Court granted certiorari to decide whether the Federal Circuit properly exercised jurisdiction over the appeal. Oral arguments were heard on March 19, 2002. James W. Dabney argued the case for Holmes Group. Peter W. Gowdey argued the case for Vornado Air Circulation Systems. On June 3, 2002, the Court ruled 9–0 for Holmes.

=== Scalia's majority opinion ===
Justice Scalia authored the court's majority opinion. The majority held that for a Federal Court to have jurisdiction, a patent claim must be in the complaint, not in some other pleading.

=== Stevens's concurring opinion ===
Justice Stevens authored an opinion in which he concurred with the judgment of the Court and with Parts I and II-A of Scalia's opinion.

=== Ginsburg's concurring opinion ===
Justice Ginsburg authored an opinion in which she concurred with the judgment of the Court.
