= Mobile network operator =

Cellular service provider

A mobile network operator (MNO), also known as a mobile network provider, mobile network carrier, mobile, wireless service provider, wireless carrier, wireless operator, wireless telco, or cellular company, (Note: Often shortened to simply carrier (especially in American English), operator, provider, "telco", or network.) is a telecommunications service provider that sells, delivers and maintains mobile number services to customers. Mobile network operators, which own or control cellular network infrastructure, also sell service to mobile virtual network operators (MVNOs) to resell to other customers. Broadly, both mobile network operators and MVNOs are mobile phone operators.

The largest mobile network operators include China Mobile, Bharti Airtel, Vodafone, América Móvil, and Orange. In the United States, Verizon, AT&T, and T-Mobile are the major mobile network operators.

== Overview ==
A key defining characteristic of a mobile network operator is that it must own or control access to a radio spectrum license from a regulatory or government entity, and also that it must own or control the elements of the cellular network infrastructure necessary to provide services to subscribers over the licensed radio spectrum. In addition the operator would also contain other elements like the back haul infrastructure and provisioning computer systems.

A mobile network operator typically also has the necessary provisioning, billing, and customer care computer systems, and the marketing, customer care, and engineering organizations needed to sell, deliver, and bill for services. However, a mobile network operator can outsource any of these systems or functions and still be considered a mobile network operator.

In addition to obtaining revenue by offering retail services under its own brand, a mobile network operator may also sell access to network services at wholesale rates to mobile virtual network operators (MVNO).

== See also ==
- Internet service provider
- List of mobile network operators
- List of telecommunications companies
- Telephone company
- Open-access network
