= TeleTu =

Italian telecommunications company

TeleTu S.p.A.
- Formerly: Tele2 Italia S.p.A. (1999-2007); Opitel S.p.A. (2007-2010)
- Company type: Subsidiary
- Industry: Telecommunications
- Founded: April 1999; 26 years ago
- Founder: Tele2
- Defunct: October 1, 2012 (as company) April 1, 2015 (as brand)
- Fate: Merged into Vodafone Italy
- Successor: Vodafone Italy
- Headquarters: Milan, Italy
- Area served: Italy
- Products: Fixed-line telephony
- Owner: Vodafone Italy (100%)
- Parent: Vodafone Group
- Website: www.teletu.it

TeleTu (formerly Tele2 Italia) was an Italian telecommunications company that provided fixed-line telephony services.

Founded in 1999 by Tele2, in 2007 it was sold to Vodafone, which incorporated it in 2012, starting a process of divesting the brand, completed in 2015.

== History ==
In April 1999 Tele2 founded its Italian branch, Tele2 Italia.

On 6 October 2007, as also happened in Spain, it was acquired by Vodafone. This operation is completed in December. The company thus changed its name to Opitel, temporarily maintaining the Tele2 brand.

No longer being linked to Tele2, from 1 January 2010 the operator's brand name was changed, which thus became TeleTu. On January 4, the company name was also changed to TeleTu.

On 1 October 2012 TeleTu, following the merger by incorporation with Vodafone, began selling its products under the Vodafone brand. From 1 April 2015 the TeleTu brand was officially abandoned in favor of that of the parent company and all those who were its customers automatically switched to Vodafone.

== Logo history ==
1999-2007

2007-2010

2010-

== See also ==
- Tele2
- Vodafone
- Vodafone Italy
