= HUD v. Rucker =

- Supreme Court of the United States

Decided March 26, 2002
- Full case name: HUD v. Rucker
- Citations: 535 U.S. 125 (more)

Holding
- Congress's authorization of evictions of tenants from public housing where a tenant's invitee into the housing engaged in drug-related activity and the tenant did not know about it was constitutional.

Court membership
- Chief Justice William Rehnquist Associate Justices John P. Stevens · Sandra Day O'Connor; Antonin Scalia · Anthony Kennedy; David Souter · Clarence Thomas; Ruth Bader Ginsburg · Stephen Breyer

HUD v. Rucker, 535 U.S. 125 (2002), was a United States Supreme Court case in which the Court held Congress's authorization of evictions of tenants from public housing where a tenant's invitee into the housing engaged in drug-related activity and the tenant did not know about it was constitutional.
