= Sprint Communications, Inc. v. Jacobs =

- Supreme Court of the United States

Argued November 5, 2013 Decided December 10, 2013
- Full case name: Sprint Communications Inc., Petitioner v. Elizabeth S. Jacobs et al.
- Docket no.: 12-815
- Citations: 571 U.S. 69 (more) 134 S. Ct. 584; 187 L. Ed. 2d 505
- Argument: Oral argument

Case history
- Prior: 690 F.3d 864 (8th Cir. 2012) (reversed)

Holding
- Federal court abstention under the Younger v. Harris doctrine is not in order simply because a pending state-court proceeding involves the same subject matter.

Court membership
- Chief Justice John Roberts Associate Justices Antonin Scalia · Anthony Kennedy; Clarence Thomas · Ruth Bader Ginsburg; Stephen Breyer · Samuel Alito; Sonia Sotomayor · Elena Kagan

Case opinion
- Majority: Ginsburg, joined by unanimous

Laws applied
- Younger v. Harris

Sprint Communications, Inc. v. Jacobs, 571 U.S. 69 (2013), was a decision by the United States Supreme Court in which a unanimous Court held that federal court abstention under the Younger v. Harris doctrine is not in order simply because a pending state-court proceeding involves the same subject matter. The case involved a dispute between Sprint Corporation and Windstream Communications.

== Background ==
Sprint Corporation had paid Windstream Communications for certain long-distance calls from Sprint customers to Windstream customers in Iowa. In 2009, Sprint withheld payment for Voice over IP (VoIP) calls after concluding that the Telecommunications Act of 1996 pre-empted intrastate regulation of VoIP traffic. Windstream then threatened to block all calls to and from Sprint customers.

In January 2010, Sprint filed a complaint with the Iowa Utilities Board (IUB) requesting a declaration that it was proper to withhold VoIP access charges. Though Sprint settled the dispute with Windstream and withdrew the complaint, the board continued the proceeding so that it could decide the underlying issue of VoIP classification under federal law.

In February 2011, the IUB issued an order with its own interpretation of VoIP’s classification under federal law along with a determination that Sprint was liable to Windstream for the access charges. Sprint then filed suit against the board in both federal district court (seeking a declaration that the Telecommunications Act preempted the board's decision and seeking an injunction against enforcement) and state court (reiterating the preemption argument, and asserting state law and procedural due process claims).

The federal district court dismissed the case because of the pending state suit and ruled that the Younger abstention applied. On appeal, the Eighth Circuit affirmed the abstention, vacated the dismissal, and remanded the case to the district court and ordered it enter a stay during the pendency of the state-court proceedings.

== Supreme Court ==
Justice Ginsburg delivered the opinion for a unanimous Court.

In Younger v. Harris, 401 U.S. 37 (1971), the Supreme Court ruled that federal courts are required to abstain from hearing any civil rights tort claims brought by a person who is currently being prosecuted for a matter arising from that claim (the Younger abstention). The Court also recognized three exceptions to this abstention: 1) where the prosecution is in bad faith; 2) where the prosecution is part of some pattern of harassment against an individual; 3) or where the law being enforced is utterly and irredeemably unconstitutional.

The Court ruled that none of the three exemptions to the Younger abstention apply in this case. Federal courts "are obliged to decide cases within the scope of federal jurisdiction" and "[a]bstention is not in order simply because a pending state-court proceeding involves the same subject matter."

After the decision, the Eighth Circuit vacated its earlier opinion, reversed the district court, and remanded the case to the district court for further proceedings.

== See also ==
- Verizon Communications Inc. v. FCC
