= Alabama v. Shelton =

- Supreme Court of the United States

Argued February 19, 2002 Decided May 20, 2002
- Full case name: Alabama v. LeReed Shelton
- Citations: 535 U.S. 654 (more) 122 S. Ct. 1764; 152 L. Ed. 2d 888; 02 Cal. Daily Op. Serv. 4307; 2002 Daily Journal D.A.R. 5472; 15 Fla. L. Weekly Fed. S 281

Case history
- Prior: Defendant convicted, Alabama Circuit Court; affirmed, 851 So. 2d 83 (Ala. Crim. App. 1998); sentence reversed, 851 So. 2d 96 (Ala. 2000); certiorari granted, 532 U.S. 1018 (2001).

Holding
- A suspended sentence that may result in incarceration may not be imposed if defendant did not have counsel at trial.

Court membership
- Chief Justice William Rehnquist Associate Justices John P. Stevens · Sandra Day O'Connor; Antonin Scalia · Anthony Kennedy; David Souter · Clarence Thomas; Ruth Bader Ginsburg · Stephen Breyer

Case opinions
- Majority: Ginsburg, joined by Stevens, O'Connor, Souter, Breyer
- Dissent: Scalia, joined by Rehnquist, Kennedy, Thomas

Laws applied
- U.S. Const. amend. VI

Alabama v. Shelton, 535 U.S. 654 (2002), was a United States Supreme Court case in which the Court upheld the Alabama Supreme Court's ruling that counsel (a lawyer) must be provided for the accused in order to impose a suspended prison sentence.

== Background ==
Shelton was accused of third-degree assault, which, in Alabama, is a misdemeanor and carries a maximum sentence of one year in prison and a $2,000 fine. The court repeatedly warned Shelton of the dangers of representing himself during the trial, yet failed to offer him counsel. He represented himself both in the local court, where he was convicted, and the Alabama Circuit Court, where he was also convicted. However, the Circuit Court gave Shelton a 30-day suspended sentence and 2 years' probation.

The Criminal Court of Appeals found that it was not compulsory to offer the defendant counsel for a suspended sentence because the sentence did not result in actual confinement.

The Supreme Court of Alabama stated that: (1) a defendant may not be sentenced to a term of imprisonment absent provision of counsel; and (2) for purposes of this rule, a suspended sentence constitutes a "term of imprisonment," even though incarceration is not immediate or inevitable.

== Opinion of the Court ==
The United States Supreme Court affirmed the Supreme Court of Alabama's decision.

A suspended sentence that may end up in the actual deprivation of a person's liberty may not be imposed unless the defendant was accorded the guiding hand of counsel in the prosecution for the crime charged.

It is not true that only those criminal proceedings result-ing in immediate actual imprisonment trigger an indigent defendant's right to state-appointed counsel under the Federal Constitution's Sixth Amendment, for (1) no person may be imprisoned for any offense unless the person was represented by counsel at trial; and (2) the Sixth Amendment inquiry trains on the stage of the proceed-ings where the defendant's guilt is adjudicated, eligibility for imprisonment established, and prison sentence determined.

...does the Sixth Amendment permit activation of a suspended sentence upon the defendant's violation of the terms of probation? We conclude that it does not. A suspended sentence is a prison term imposed for the offense of conviction.

== See also ==
Works related to Alabama v. Shelton at Wikisource
