= GLUMP =

Irish telecom process

Geographic Number Portability Unbundled Line Metallic Path or GLUMP is a product related to Local Loop Unbundling (LLU) in the Republic of Ireland. Geographic Number Portability (GNP) is the process of a user moving their number to a new address. Local Loop Unbundling (LLU) is the process of a line being used by a 3rd party to provide a service on the incumbent's exchange or line. Comreg (The Irish Communications Regulator) and eircom, the incumbent telecom company, have named the combination GLUMP.

Local Loop Unbundling (LLU) is the better known process of a third party using the "last mile" Copper. GLUMP is a variation on this where a subscriber to a 3rd party for LLU based broadband may keep their existing number or even the analogue phone service from the incumbent. Normally the phone number and analogue line is lost on getting a LLU based product.

In the last revision of GLUMP (assisted by Comreg) 2007 only Magnet Networks was availing of this eircom product and by late 2007 even Magnet was making little use as they concentrate on offering their triple-play (Phone, Broadband and TV) via fibre.

Number Portability (NP) is defined as a right for the Irish user by Comreg; however, while porting a number between Mobile Phone Operators takes less than an hour, porting an eircom fixed line number can take days to months even if GLUMP is not involved. GLUMP is not required to port an existing number to a non-eircom connection, such as VOIP or phone service provided via fibre, cable or Metro Microwave.

== History ==
GLUMP was developed in 2006. The Irish Information Technology news wire reported at the time:

(The) Commission for Communication Regulation (ComReg) ... expressed displeasure at the level of performance and delays in terms of ironing out glitches with some broadband LLU products. ComReg was due to report last week as part of the "roadmap" for LLU, but postponed publication in order to collate data and "provide feedback on key milestones which were due to be completed in early August". One of the milestones set out for the original 8 August deadline was that broadband customers should be able to keep their phone number when changing supplier, and that a long term solution for this issue should be identified. Known in the telecoms sector as number portability, in combination with LLU it is called GLUMP (Geographic Number Portability Unbundled Line Metallic Path). ComReg reports that Eircom launched a trial phase of this service 9 August, and that up to six meetings have been held with industry stakeholders over the past month to tackle automation of number portability.

== Investment ==
Investors have been warned about the risks of investing in this, or any other telecommunications securities, under Ireland's Blue Sky Law.
