= List of United States Supreme Court cases, volume 535 =

This is a list of all the United States Supreme Court cases from volume 535 of the United States Reports:

| Case name | Citation | Date decided |
|---|---|---|
| New York v. FERC | 535 U.S. 1 | 2002 |
| Young v. United States | 535 U.S. 43 | 2002 |
| United States v. Vonn | 535 U.S. 55 | 2002 |
| Ragsdale v. Wolverine World Wide, Inc. | 535 U.S. 81 | 2002 |
| Edelman v. Lynchburg Coll. | 535 U.S. 106 | 2002 |
| HUD v. Rucker | 535 U.S. 125 | 2002 |
| Hoffman Plastic Compounds, Inc. v. NLRB | 535 U.S. 137 | 2002 |
| Mickens v. Taylor | 535 U.S. 162 | 2002 |
| Barnhart v. Walton | 535 U.S. 212 | 2002 |
| Adams v. Fla. Power Corp. | 535 U.S. 228 | 2002 |
Dismissed as improvidently granted.
| Sao Paulo State v. Am. Tobacco Co. | 535 U.S. 229 | 2002 |
| Ashcroft v. Free Speech Coalition | 535 U.S. 234 | 2002 |
| United States v. Craft | 535 U.S. 274 | 2002 |
| Tahoe-Sierra Preservation Council, Inc. v. Tahoe Regional Planning Agency | 535 U.S. 302 | 2002 |
| Thompson v. W. States Med. Center | 535 U.S. 357 | 2002 |
| US Airways, Inc. v. Barnett | 535 U.S. 391 | 2002 |
| City of Los Angeles v. Alameda Books, Inc. | 535 U.S. 425 | 2002 |
| Verizon Communications Inc. v. FCC (2002) | 535 U.S. 467 | 2002 |
| Ashcroft v. ACLU | 535 U.S. 564 | 2002 |
| Lapides v. Univ. System of Ga. | 535 U.S. 613 | 2002 |
| United States v. Cotton | 535 U.S. 625 | 2002 |
| Verizon Maryland, Inc. v. Public Service Commission | 535 U.S. 635 | 2002 |
| Alabama v. Shelton | 535 U.S. 654 | 2002 |
| Mathias v. WorldCom Technologies, Inc. | 535 U.S. 682 | 2002 |
| Bell v. Cone | 535 U.S. 685 | 2002 |
| Festo Corp. v. Shoketsu Kinzoku Kogyo Kabushiki Co. | 535 U.S. 722 | 2002 |
| Fed. Maritime Comm'n v. S.C. Ports Auth. | 535 U.S. 743 | 2002 |
| Gisbrecht v. Barnhart | 535 U.S. 789 | 2002 |
| SEC v. Zandford | 535 U.S. 813 | 2002 |
| Holmes Group, Inc. v. Vornado Air Circulation Systems, Inc. | 535 U.S. 826 | 2002 |
| Bartlett v. Stephenson | 535 U.S. 1301 | May 17, 2002 |
