= Competitive local exchange carrier =

Type of telecommunications company

A competitive local exchange carrier (CLEC) is a North American telecommunications provider classification that emerged based on the competition model of the Telecommunications Act of 1996 in the United States. The act required the previously established incumbent local exchange carrier (ILEC) in each local market to provide infrastructure hosting and services to CLECs to enable competition with the ILEC over the Public switched telephone network (PTSN). With many providers releasing fibreoptics to the premises much of the legislation concerning competition over the copper twisted pair (Landline) network to the premises has become void.

== Background ==
Local exchange carriers (LECs) are characterized as incumbent (ILECs) or competitive (CLECs). The ILECs are usually the original, monopoly LEC in a given area, and receive different regulatory treatment from the newer CLECs. A data local exchange carrier (DLEC) is a CLEC specializing in DSL services by leasing lines from the ILEC and reselling them to Internet service providers (ISPs).

== History ==
CLECs evolved from the competitive access providers (CAPs) that began to offer private line and special access services in competition with the ILECs beginning in 1985. The CAPs (such as Teleport Communications Group (TCG) and Metropolitan Fiber Systems (MFS)) deployed fiber optic systems in the central business districts of the largest U.S. cities (New York, Chicago, Boston, etc.) A number of state public utilities commissions, particularly New York, Illinois, and Massachusetts, encouraged this competition. By the early 1990s, the CAPs began to install switches in their fiber systems. Initially, they offered a "shared PBX" service with these switches and interconnected with the ILECs as end users rather than as co-carriers. However, the New York Public Service Commission authorized the nation's first CLEC when it required New York Telephone (the ILEC) to allow Teleport Communications Group's switches in New York City to connect as peers. Other states followed New York's lead so that, by the mid-1990s, most of the large states had authorized local exchange competition.

== Growth ==
The Telecommunications Act of 1996 incorporated the successful results of the state-by-state authorization process by creating a uniform national law to allow local exchange competition. This had the unintended consequence of stimulating the formation of many more CLECs than the markets could bear. The formation of these CLECs, with easy financing from equipment vendors and IPOs, was a significant contributor to the "telecom bubble" of the late 1990s which then turned into the "bust" of 2001–2002.

The original CAP/CLECs spent the decade from 1985–1995 deploying their own fiber optics networks and digital switches so that their only reliance on the ILEC was leasing some DS-1 loops to locations not served by the CLEC's own fiber and interconnecting the CLEC's switches with the ILECs' on a peer-to-peer basis. While not trivial dependencies, the original "facilities-based" CLECs such as TCG and MFS were beginning to become profitable by the time the Telecom Act was adopted. In contrast, many CLECs formed in the post-Telecom Act "bubble" operated using the unbundled Network Element Platform (UNE-P), in which they resold the ILECs' service by leasing the underlying copper and port space on the ILEC's local switch. This greater dependency on the ILECs made these "UNE-P CLECs" vulnerable to changes in the UNE-P rules.

In the meantime, the largest facilities-based CLECs, MFS, and TCG, had IPOs and then were acquired by WorldCom and AT&T, respectively, in 1996 and 1998, as those long distance companies prepared to defend their business customers from the Regional Bell Operating Companies' (RBOC) incipient entry into the long distance business.

== Important FCC rulings ==
With the Triennial Review in August 2003, the FCC began to rewrite a large portion of the rules implementing the Telecommunications Act of 1996. One alternative to the UNE-P is unbundled network element loop (UNE-L), in which the CLEC has access to or operates their own local switch. The underlying copper (loop) that runs to the subscriber's premises is then leased by the CLEC, and cross-connected to the CLEC's switch. Both UNE-P and UNE-L have their own unique advantages and disadvantages. Other CLECs bypass the ILEC's network entirely, using their own facilities. These facility-based LECs include cable companies offering phone service over coaxial cable.

Non facilities-based CLECs that operate under the UNE-P rules are able to resell wholesale services purchased from multiple ILECs, thereby establishing broader geographical coverage than ILECs or facilities-based CLECs.

In October 2004, the U.S. Supreme Court allowed a lower court's ruling to stand (by refusing to hear the appeal) that voided rules requiring ILECs to lease certain network elements (such as local switching or the high-frequency portion of the loop) at a cost-based regulated wholesale price to CLECs. The FCC agreed earlier in the year to rewrite rather than appeal the validity of the rules. In December 2004, the FCC released another set of rules which phase out, over a year, all CLEC leasing of ILEC local switching, while preserving access to most copper local loops and some interoffice facilities.

== Proposed termination ==
In May 2018, USTelecom, the Washington, D.C. trade group for the major telecommunication companies, filed a petition with the FCC, asking it to end the leasing rule within 2 1/2 years, which would terminate the CLEC operations of smaller telecommunications companies.

== See also ==
- Monopoly
- Liberalization
- Deregulation
- Regional Bell operating company
- Mobile virtual network operator
- Local loop unbundling
- Cable telephony
