= Local-loop unbundling =

Telecommunications regulatory process

Local loop unbundling (LLU or LLUB) is the regulatory process of allowing multiple telecommunications operators to use connections from a telephone exchange to the customer's location. The physical wire connection between the local exchange and the customer is known as a "local loop" and is owned by the incumbent local exchange carrier (also referred to as the "ILEC", "local exchange", or in the United States, either a "Baby Bell" or an independent telephone company). To increase competition, other providers are granted unbundled access.

== Policy background ==
LLU is generally opposed by ILECs, which are generally either former investor-owned (North America) or state-owned monopoly enterprises. ILECs argue that LLU amounts to regulatory taking, which causes them to be compelled to provide competitors with business inputs, so they believe that LLU stifles infrastructure-based competition and technical innovation because new entrants prefer to use the incumbent's network instead of building their own and that the regulatory interference required to make LLU work (e.g., to set the LLU access price) is detrimental to the market.

New entrants, on the other hand, argue that since they cannot economically duplicate the incumbent's local loop, they cannot provide certain services, such as ADSL, thus allowing the incumbent to monopolise the respective potentially competitive market(s) and prevent innovation. They argue that alternative access technologies, such as wireless local loop, have been proven uncompetitive or impractical, and that under current pricing models, the incumbent is in many cases, depending on the regulatory model, guaranteed a fair price for the use of its facilities, including an appropriate return on investment. Finally, they argue that the ILECs generally did not construct their local loop in a competitive market environment, but under legal monopoly protection and using taxpayer's money, meaning that, according to the new entrants, that ILECs should not to be entitled to continue to extract regulated rates of return, which often include monopoly rents from the local loop.

Most industrially developed nations, including the US, Australia, the European Union member states, and India, have introduced regulatory frameworks that provide for LLU. Regulators are tasked with regulating a changing market without preventing innovation and without improperly disadvantaging competitors.

The first action in the EU resulted from a report written for the European Commission in 1993. It took several years for the EU legislation to require unbundling and in individual countries in the EU, the process took further time to mature to become practical and economic rather than being a legal possibility. The 1993 report referred to the requirement to unbundle optical fibre access and recommended deferral to a later date when fibre access would be more common. In 2006, there were signs that, as a result of the municipal fibre networks movement in countries such as Sweden, where unbundled local loop fibre is commercially available from both the incumbent and competitors, there was a potential for policy evolving in a different direction.

In 1996, Section 251 of the United States Telecommunication Act defined unbundled access as:

The duty to provide, to any requesting telecommunications carrier for the provision of a telecommunications service, nondiscriminatory access to network elements on an unbundled basis at any technically feasible point on rates, terms, and conditions that are just, reasonable, and nondiscriminatory in accordance with the terms and conditions of the agreement and the requirements of this section and section 252. An incumbent local exchange carrier shall provide such unbundled network elements in a manner that allows requesting carriers to combine such elements in order to provide such telecommunications service.

== Unbundling developments around the world ==
=== World Trade Organisation ===
Some provisions of World Trade Organization (WTO) telecommunications law can be read to require unbundling:

- Section 5(a) of the GATS Annex on Telecommunications requires WTO Members to guarantee service suppliers "access to and use of public telecommunications transport networks [...] for the supply of a service". New entrants have argued that without LLU, they cannot supply services such as ADSL.
- Section 2.2(b) of the 1998 Reference Paper, to which some Members have subscribed, requires "sufficiently unbundled interconnection" with major providers. However, the Paper's definition of interconnection appears to exclude LLU. Section 1 of the paper requires members to maintain "appropriate measures [...] for the purpose of preventing [major] suppliers [...] from engaging in or continuing anti-competitive practices." New entrants argue that such practices include not giving competitors access to facilities necessary for market entry, such as the local loop.

The question has not been settled before a WTO judicial body, and it is thought that these obligations may only apply where the respective WTO member has committed itself to open its basic telecommunications market to competition. About 80 mostly-developed members have done so since 1998.

=== India ===
LLU has not been implemented in Indian cities yet. However, BSNL recently stated that it would open up its copper loops for private participation. The proliferation of WiMax and cable broadband has increased broadband penetration and market competition. By 2008, a price war had reduced basic broadband prices to INR 250 (US$6), including line rental without any long-term contracts. In rural areas, the state player, BSNL, is still the leading, and often the only supplier. Although BSNL is a monopoly, it is used by the government to create competition.

=== European Union ===
The implementation of local loop unbundling is a requirement of European Union policy on competition in the telecommunications sector and has been introduced, at various stages of development, in all member states as a postreference offer for unbundled access to their local loops and related facilities. The offers are required to be unbundled so that the beneficiary does not have to pay for network elements or facilities that are unnecessary for supplying its services, and are required to contain a description of the components of the offer, associated terms, and conditions, including charges.

European States that have been approved for membership to the EU have an obligation to introduce LLU as part of the liberalisation of their communications sector.

=== United Kingdom ===
On 23 January 2001, Easynet became the first operator in the mainland UK to unbundle a local loop of copper wire from British Telecom's network and provide its own broadband service with it.

By 14 January 2006, 210,000 local loop connections had been unbundled from BT operation under local loop unbundling. Ofcom had hoped that 1 million local loop connections would be unbundled by June 2006. However, as reported by The Register on 15 June 2006, the figure had reached only 500,000, but was growing by 20,000 a week. In November 2006, Ofcom announced that 1,000,000 connections had been unbundled. By April 2007, the figure was 2,000,000.

By June 2006, AOL UK had unbundled 100,000 lines through its £120 million investment.

On 10 October 2006, Carphone Warehouse announced its purchase of AOL UK, the leading LLU operator, for £370m. This made Carphone Warehouse the third largest broadband provider and the largest LLU operator, with more than 150,000 LLU customers.

On 8 May 2009, TalkTalk, which was owned by Carphone Warehouse, announced that they would purchase Tiscali UK's assets for £235 million. On 30 June 2009, Tiscali sold its UK subsidiary to Carphone Warehouse following regulatory approval from the European Union. This purchase made TalkTalk the largest home broadband supplier in the UK, with 4.25 million home broadband subscribers, compared to BT's 3.9 million. The service was rebranded as TalkTalk in January 2010.

Most LLU operators only unbundle the broadband service, leaving the traditional telephone service using BT's core equipment (with or without the provision of carrier preselect). When the traditional telephone service is also unbundled (full LLU), operators usually prohibit selected calls being made with the networks of other telephone providers (i.e. accessed using a three- to five-digit prefix beginning with '1'). These calls can usually still be made by using an 0800 or other non-geographic (NGN) access code.

Although regulators in the UK admitted that the market could become competitive over time, the purpose of mandatory local loop unbundling in the United Kingdom was to speed up the delivery of advanced services to consumers.

=== United States ===
Pursuant to the Telecommunications Act of 1996, the Federal Communications Commission (FCC) requires that ILECs lease local loops to competitors (CLECs). Prices are set through a market mechanism.

=== New Zealand ===
The Commerce Commission recommended against local loop unbundling in late 2003 as Telecom New Zealand (now Spark New Zealand) offered a market-led solution. In May 2004, this was confirmed by the New Zealand government, despite the "call4change" campaign made by some of Telecom's competitors. Part of Telecom's commitment to the Commerce Commission to avoid unbundling was a promise to deliver 250,000 new residential broadband connections by the end of 2005, one-third of which were to be wholesaled through other providers. Telecom failed to achieve the number of wholesale connections required, despite the management making a claim that the agreement had been for only one-third of the growth rather than one-third of the total. The claim was rejected by the Commerce Commission, and the publicised figure of 83,333 wholesale connections out of 250,000 was held to be the true target. The achieved number was less than 50,000 wholesale connections, despite total connections exceeding 300,000.

On 3 May 2006, the government announced it would require the unbundling of the local loop. This was in response to concerns about the low levels of broadband uptake. Regulatory actions such as information disclosure, the separate accounting of Telecom New Zealand business operations, and enhanced Commerce Commission monitoring were announced.

On 9 August 2007, Telecom released the keys to exchanges in Glenfield and Ponsonby in Auckland. In March 2008, Telecom activated ADSL 2+ services from five Auckland exchanges (Glenfield, Browns Bay, Ellerslie, Mt. Albert and Ponsonby), with further plans for the rest of Auckland and other major centres, allowing other ISPs to take advantage.

With the number of copper (DSL) connections falling rapidly in New Zealand as of 2023, a large majority of internet connections are now through fibre as opposed to copper, which is wholesaled by the former Telecom company Chorus, rendering local loop unbundling a minor percentage in DSL connections.

=== Switzerland ===
Switzerland is one of the last OECD nations to provide for unbundling. The Swiss Federal Supreme Court held in 2001 that the 1996 Swiss Telecommunications Act did not require it. The government then enacted an ordinance providing for unbundling in 2003 and the Swiss Parliament amended the act in 2006. While infrastructure-based access is now generally available, unbundled fast bitstream access is limited to a period of four years after the entry into force of the act.

Unbundling requests tend to be managed by the courts; however, unlike in the EU, Swiss law does not provide for an ex ante regulation of access conditions by the regulator. Instead, under the Swiss ex post regulation system, each new entrant must first try to reach an individual agreement with Swisscom, the state-owned ILEC.

=== Hong Kong ===
Mandatory local loop unbundling policy (termed Type II Interconnection (Traditional Chinese:第二類互連) in Hong Kong) started on 1 July 1995 (the same day of telephone market liberalisation) to give choices to customers. After 10 years, new operators have built their networks, covering a large region of Hong Kong; the government considered it a good time to withdraw mandatory local loop unbundling policy, to persuade operators to build their own networks, and let businesses run themselves with a minimum of government intervention. At the meeting of the Executive Council on 6 July 2004, the government decided that the regulatory intervention under the Type II Interconnection policy, which was applicable to telephone exchanges for individual buildings covered by such exchanges, should be withdrawn, as outlined by conditions documented in a statement by the Telecommunications Authority. After that, the terms of interconnection would be negotiated between telephone operators. Hong Kong is the only advanced economy that has withdrawn the mandatory local loop unbundling policy.

=== South Africa ===
On 25 May 2006, the Minister of Communications of South Africa, Ivy Matsepe-Casaburri, established the Local Loop Unbundling Committee (chaired by Professor Tshilidzi Marwala) to recommend the appropriate local loop unbundling models. The Local Loop Unbundling Committee submitted a report to Minister Matsepe-Casaburri on 25 May 2007. The report recommended that:

- Models that permit customers to access both voice and data should be offered by many different companies; the models recommended were full unbundling, line sharing, and bitstream access
- Customers should exercise carrier pre-selection and thus be able to switch between service providers
- An organisation be created to manage the local loop and that this organisation should be under the guidance of the regulatory organizagtion ICASA and that ICASA be capacitated in terms of resources
- Service providers approved by ICASA should have access to telephone exchange infrastructure whenever necessary
- A regulatory guideline should be established and managed by ICASA to guarantee that strategic issues like the quality of the local loop be optimised for the regulation and delivery of services

Based on this report, the Minister issued policy directives to ICASA to undergo the unbundling process. At the end of March 2010, nothing had occurred; however, a deadline of 1 November 2011 was set by the Minister of Communications for the monopoly holder, Telkom SA, to finalise the unbundling process.

== See also ==
- Forced-access regulation
- GLUMP ("Geographic Number Portability Unbundled Line Metallic Path")
- Local number portability
- Loop management system
- Mobile number portability
- Product bundling
- Sub-loop unbundling
- Unbundling in France (in French)
