= Incumbent local exchange carrier =

Type of telephone carrier in the US and Canada

An incumbent local exchange carrier (ILEC) is a local telephone company which held the regional monopoly on landline service before the market was opened to competitive local exchange carriers, or the corporate successor of such a firm, in the United States and Canada.

== Definition ==
An incumbent local exchange carrier is a local exchange carrier (LEC) in a specific area that

- on the date of enactment of the Telecommunications Act of 1996, provided telephone exchange service
- on the date of enactment, was deemed to be a member of the National Exchange Carrier Association pursuant to the Code of Federal Regulations (C.F.R) Title 47, section 69.601(b).
- or is a person or entity that, on or after such date of enactment, became a successor or assignee of a member described in the previous bullet.

The Federal Communications Commission (FCC) may, by rule, provide for the treatment of an LEC (or class or category thereof) as an ILEC if:

- such carrier occupies a position in the market for telephone exchange service within an area that is comparable to the position occupied by a carrier described previously
- such carrier has substantially replaced an ILEC described previously
- such treatment is consistent with the public interest, convenience and necessity

== Duties ==
ILECs have the same duties as a LEC and in addition:

- Duty to negotiate – The duty to negotiate in good faith the particular terms and conditions of agreements to fulfill the duties described for a LEC and the specific ones for the ILEC. The requesting telecommunications carrier also has the duty to negotiate in good faith the terms and conditions of such agreements.
- Interconnection – The duty to provide, for the facilities and equipment of any requesting telecommunications carrier, interconnection with the LEC's network –
  - For the transmission and routing of telephone exchange service and exchange access
  - At any technically feasible point within the carrier's network
  - That is at least equal in quality to that provided by the LEC to itself or to any subsidiary, affiliate or any other party to which the carrier provides interconnection
  - On rates, terms and conditions that are just, reasonable and nondiscriminatory, in accordance with the terms and conditions of the agreement
- Unbundled access - The duty to provide, to any requesting telecommunications carrier for the provision of a telecommunications service, nondiscriminatory access to network elements on an unbundled basis at any technically feasible point on rates, terms and conditions that are just, reasonable and nondiscriminatory in accordance with the terms and conditions of the agreement. An ILEC shall provide such unbundled network elements in a manner that allows requesting carriers to combine such elements in order to provide such telecommunications service.
- Resale – The duty
  - To offer for resale at wholesale rates any telecommunications service that the carrier provides at retail to subscribers who are not telecommunications carriers
  - Not to prohibit, and not to impose unreasonable or discriminatory conditions or limitations on, the resale of such telecommunications service,
- Notice of changes – The duty to provide reasonable public notice of changes in the information necessary for the transmission and routing of services using that local exchange carrier's facilities or networks, as well as of any other changes that would affect the interoperability of those facilities and networks.
- Colocation – The duty to provide, on rates, terms and conditions that are just, reasonable and nondiscriminatory, for physical colocation of equipment necessary for interconnection or access to unbundled network elements at the premises of the local exchange carrier, except that the carrier may provide for virtual colocation if the LEC demonstrates that physical colocation is not practical for technical reasons or because of space limitations.

== United States ==
In the United States, ILECs are companies in existence at the time of the breakup of AT&T into the Regional Bell Operating Companies (RBOCs), also known as the "Baby Bells".

Various regional independents also held incumbent monopolies in their respective regions. The largest of these was GTE, the second largest ILEC after the Bell System. GTE was later absorbed into Verizon, an RBOC. In some areas, an independent telephone company is responsible for providing local telephone exchange services in a specified geographic area.

== Canada ==
In Canada, ILECs are the original telephone companies such as Telus (BC Tel and Alberta Government Telephones), SaskTel, Manitoba Telecom Services (MTS Allstream), Bell Canada and Aliant, as well as any other company that previously held a monopoly to serve a community and continues to do so, or a successor company if it is bought and absorbed. ILECs are obligated to serve the entire exchange area as a "provider of last resort", while CLECs can choose which locations to serve, be it by facilities of their own or by resale of services of an ILEC or another CLEC.

- Alberta, Manitoba, Saskatchewan – originally established by Bell Canada and small area independent companies; all purchased by the provincial governments (Alberta, in the 1906–1908 period; Manitoba, circa 1908; Saskatchewan, 1908–1909 period) and developed into a complete service to all communities, as the ILECs; Alberta's privatized as Telus in the 1990s, Manitoba's in 1997, while Saskatchewan's remains a crown corporation
- British Columbia – originally established as several independent companies; amalgamated by GTE as BC Tel with the second-last private independent being acquired circa 1980, as the ILEC; merged with Telus in 1999; Northwestel was the ILEC in the northern area as service was initiated by the U.S. Army in 1942, then eventually turned over to government and crown corporation entities; Prince Rupert City Tel remains the only ILEC not associated with either
- New Brunswick, Nova Scotia, P.E.I. – established by Bell Canada and small area independent companies; Bell operations sold off in 1888-89 to separate companies which eventually consolidated their operations to absorb most independents (last NB independent bought in 1973); Bell acquired interests in the companies during the 1960s, which are the ILECs, though they merged into a single company covering four provinces including Newfoundland.
- Newfoundland – private companies, mostly small, with one that eventually acquired the other small companies; government developed a system that served smaller communities, and which was taken over by a federal crown corporation in 1950, then sold to the remaining large private company in 1988, becoming the ILEC that merged with the three Maritime companies
- Ontario and Quebec – private companies, Bell Canada being the dominant one; Bell purchased several of the small independents through the years; other independents amalgamated; this mix became the array of ILECs in the 1990s
- Territories – some independent companies in the west, plus U.S. Army system which came under crown corporation in 1948; from 1958–64, independent companies acquired by the crown corporation that would be Northwestel as of 1979, and developed in remaining communities; Bell Canada developed services in eastern area, then sold to Northwestel in 1992; Northwestel becomes ILEC with introduction of local competition in 2007.
