= Telecommunications Act of 1996 =

1996 U.S. legislation overhauling telecommunications regulations and laws

- Other short titles: Communications Decency Act of 1996
- Long title: An Act to promote competition and reduce regulation in order to secure lower prices and higher quality services for American telecommunications consumers and encourage the rapid development of new telecommunications technologies.
- Nicknames: Communications Act of 1995
- Enacted by: the 104th United States Congress
- Effective: February 8, 1996

Citations
- Public law: 104-104
- Statutes at Large: 110 Stat. 56

Codification
- Acts amended: Communications Act of 1934
- Titles amended: 47 U.S.C.: Telegraphy
- U.S.C. sections amended: 47 U.S.C. § 609; 47 U.S.C. § 251 et seq.; 47 U.S.C. § 151 et seq.; 47 U.S.C. § 271 et seq.

Legislative history
- Introduced in the Senate as S. 652 by Larry Pressler (R-SD) on March 30, 1995; Committee consideration by Senate Commerce, Science, and Transportation; Passed the Senate on June 15, 1995 (81-18 Roll call vote 268, via Senate.gov); Passed the House on October 12, 1995 (passed without objection); Reported by the joint conference committee on January 31, 1996; agreed to by the House on February 1, 1996 (414-16 Roll call vote 025, via Clerk.House.gov) and by the Senate on February 1, 1996 (91-5 Roll call vote 8, via Senate.gov); Signed into law by President Bill Clinton on February 8, 1996

United States Supreme Court cases
- Reno v. American Civil Liberties Union, 521 U.S. 844 (1997); AT&T Corp. v. Iowa Utilities Bd., 525 U.S. 366 (1999); United States v. Playboy Entertainment Group, Inc., 529 U.S. 803 (2000); National Cable & Telecommunications Assn., Inc. v. Gulf Power Co., 534 U.S. 327 (2002); Verizon Communications Inc. v. FCC, 535 U.S. 467 (2002); Verizon Maryland Inc. v. Public Service Commission of Maryland, 535 U.S. 635 (2002); Mathias v. WorldCom Technologies, Inc., 535 U.S. 682 (2002); Verizon Communications Inc. v. Law Offices of Curtis V. Trinko, LLP, 540 U.S. 398 (2004); Nixon v. Missouri Municipal League, 541 U.S. 125 (2004); City of Rancho Palos Verdes v. Abrams, 544 U.S. 113 (2005); National Cable & Telecommunications Ass'n v. Brand X Internet Services, 545 U.S. 967 (2005); Talk America, Inc. v. Michigan Bell Telephone Co., 564 U.S. 50 (2011); Sprint Communications, Inc. v. Jacobs, 571 U.S. 69 (2013); T-Mobile South, LLC v. City of Roswell, 574 U.S. 293 (2015); FCC v. Prometheus Radio Project, No. 19-1231, 592 U.S. 2021; Gonzalez v. Google LLC, No. 21-1333, 598 U.S. ___ (2023); FCC v. Consumers' Research, No. 24-354, 604 U.S. ___ (2025)

The Telecommunications Act of 1996 is a United States federal law enacted by the 104th United States Congress on January 3, 1996, and signed into law on February 8, 1996 by President Bill Clinton. It primarily amended Chapter 5 of Title 47 of the United States Code. Heavily supported and lobbied for by major corporations in the telecommunications sector, the act was the first significant overhaul of United States telecommunications law in more than sixty years. It amended the Communications Act of 1934 and represented a major change in that law, because it was the first time that the Internet was added to American regulation of broadcasting and telephony.

The stated intention of the law was to "let anyone enter any communications business – to let any communications business compete in any market against any other." As such, it is often described as an attempt to deregulate the American broadcasting and telecommunications markets due to technological convergence. The Telecommunications Act of 1996 has been praised for incentivizing the expansion of networks and the offering of new services across the United States. At the same time, it is often criticized for enabling market concentration in the media and telecommunications industries, going against its stated intention by indirectly restricting newcomer access to those industries.

== Background ==
=== Development ===
Previously, the Communications Act of 1934 was the statutory framework for American communications policy, covering telephony, broadcasting, and (via later amendments) cable television. The 1934 Act created the Federal Communications Commission (FCC), the agency assigned to implement and administer the economic regulation of the interstate activities of telephone companies (then dominated by the AT&T monopoly) and the licensing of spectrum used for broadcasting and other purposes.

Starting in the 1970s, a combination of technological change, court decisions, and updates to American policy goals enabled competitive entry by new companies into some telecommunications and broadcasting markets. In this context, the 1996 Telecommunications Act was designed to allow smaller companies to enter those markets and for existing companies to operate across market sectors, via the relaxation of cross-ownership rules, multi-sector prohibitions, and other barriers to entry. One specific provision empowered the FCC to preempt all attempts by state or local governments to prevent telecommunications competition.

A report by the House of Representatives stated that the goal of the new legislation was to "provide for a pro-competitive, de-regulatory national policy framework designed to accelerate rapidly private sector deployment of advanced information technologies and services to all Americans by opening all telecommunications markets to competition".

=== New policy developments ===
One purpose of the Telecommunications Act of 1996 was to foster competition among companies willing to provide multiple communications services (such as voice calls and Internet connectivity) within network technologies that has previously been confined by law to one type of service. Therefore, the act created precise regulatory regimes based on type of network architecture, with companies subjected to different regulations depending on whether they operated in telephone, cable television, or Internet networks. The act makes a significant distinction between providers of telecommunications services and information services, with the different regulations to be followed by companies in each sector leading to confusion when those sectors technologically converged in later years.

In order to enable competition, the 1996 Act required incumbent telecommunications companies to interconnect their networks with new competing companies, and to provide wholesale access to materials and components as those smaller companies build their networks. The act also clarified intercarrier compensation rates for communications requests that are handled by multiple firms. Regional Bell Operating Companies, which were previously subjected to strict regulations to provide only local telephone service, were allowed to enter the long-distance market.

The 1996 Act also introduced more precise and detailed regulations for the funding of universal service programs via subsidies generated by monthly customer fees. This was intended to reduce the tendency of smaller telephone firms to charge above-market rates for underserved users, and to provide more transparency of fees charged to customers. However, universal service subsidies were only used to build landline telephone networks until the early 2010s.

In the media and broadcasting sector, most media ownership regulations were eased, and the cap on radio station ownership was eliminated. The act also attempted to prohibit indecency and obscenity on the Internet, via a section that was separately titled as the Communications Decency Act, though most of this section was ruled unconstitutional by the U.S. Supreme Court for violating the First Amendment. Portions of Title V remain, including Section 230, which shields Internet firms from liability for the speech of their users, and has been widely credited for enabling the growth of the Internet and social media.

== Opposition ==
=== Early criticism ===
Some smaller telecommunications companies and consumer groups stated their opposition to the new statute during Congressional hearings. For example, smaller firms predicted that they would experience difficulty in competing financially even if they faced fewer barriers to entry, and this would result in market consolidation in favor of incumbent firms. This prediction was correct, and by 2001 concentration of the American telephone market had consolidated with four major companies owning 85% of all network infrastructure, rather than the increased competition that the act intended. Critics warned that the same would happen in the media content industry.

Consumer activist Ralph Nader argued that the act was an example of corporate welfare spawned by political corruption, because it gave valuable licenses for digital broadcasting frequencies on the public airwaves to incumbent broadcasters. The act was also unpopular with early Internet activists, and was named specifically in Electronic Frontier Foundation founder John Perry Barlow's essay A Declaration of the Independence of Cyberspace as an act "which repudiates your own [American] Constitution and insults the dreams of Jefferson, Washington, Mill, Madison, DeToqueville, and Brandeis."

On the other hand, a Brookings Institution study concluded that the act incentivized upgrades to telecommunications infrastructure and new construction, despite increased industry concentration. In the long term, this helped to spread broadband access to more of the country.

=== Later criticism ===
Critics have maintained that many of the purported goals of the Telecommunications Act of 1996 did not come to fruition in the years and decades after its passage. The act's structure of regulations based on type of network infrastructure failed to predict technological convergence and created awkward regulatory burdens for companies operating in multiple segments of media and telecommunications markets. This may prohibit innovation or make the law unable to handle evolving market conditions. The law also fails to provide a guideline for regulating previously separate network technologies that have since converged (e.g. voice calls can now be delivered over Internet networks via services like VoIP). According to some critics, this situation has in fact created "re-regulation" of the marketplace with contradictory and inconsistent rules for companies to follow.

Critics have also noted that the act has failed to enable the competition that was one of its stated goals, instead exacerbating the ongoing consolidation of the media marketplace that had commenced in the decades before the act's passage, by allowing large corporations to buy out as many broadcasting stations as desired. The number of American major media content companies shrank from about fifty in 1983 to ten in 1996, and to just six in 2005. An FCC study found that the act led to a drastic decline in the number of radio station owners, even as the actual number of stations in the United States increased. This decline in owners and increase in stations has resulted in radio homogenization, in which local programming and content has been lost and content is repeated regardless of location. Activists and critics have cited similar effects in the television industry.

In the 2003 edition of his book A People's History of the United States, historian Howard Zinn named the act as a significant factor in the loss of alternative and community media, and possibly the loss of public control of information:

the Telecommunications Act of 1996...enabled the handful of corporations dominating the airwaves to expand their power further. Mergers enabled tighter control of information...The Latin American writer Eduardo Galeano commented..."Never have so many been held incommunicado by so few."

There have been attempts by the United States Congress to update the 1996 Telecommunications Act or address some of its shortcomings, such as the Communications Opportunity, Promotion and Enhancement Bill of 2006 and Internet Freedom and Nondiscrimination Act of 2006, but neither became law.

== See also ==
- Communications Act of 1934
- Consolidation of media ownership
- Open access (infrastructure)
