= Jones v. Flowers =

- Supreme Court of the United States

Argued January 17, 2006 Decided April 26, 2006
- Full case name: Gary Kent Jones v. Linda K. Flowers and Mark Wilcox, Arkansas Commissioner of State Lands
- Docket no.: 04-1477
- Citations: 547 U.S. 220 (more) 126 S. Ct. 1708; 164 L. Ed. 2d 415; 2006 U.S. LEXIS 3451; 74 U.S.L.W. 4200 (2006)

Case history
- Prior: Summary judgment granted to defendants, No. CIV2003-8565, Pulaski County Circuit Court; affirmed, 359 Ark. 443, 198 S.W.3d 520, 2004 Ark. LEXIS 722, No. 04-449, (Ark 2004); cert. granted, 545 U.S. 1165 (2005).
- Subsequent: 2008 Ark. LEXIS 267 (Apr. 17, 2008) (regarding attorney's fees)

Holding
- When the notice of a tax sale is returned unclaimed, the Fourteenth Amendment's guarantee of due process requires a state to take additional reasonable steps to contact the property owner before it can sell his property.

Court membership
- Chief Justice John Roberts Associate Justices John P. Stevens · Antonin Scalia; Anthony Kennedy · David Souter; Clarence Thomas · Ruth Bader Ginsburg; Stephen Breyer · Samuel Alito

Case opinions
- Majority: Roberts, joined by Stevens, Souter, Ginsburg, Breyer
- Dissent: Thomas, joined by Scalia, Kennedy
- Alito took no part in the consideration or decision of the case.

Laws applied
- U.S. Const. amend. XIV

Jones v. Flowers, 547 U.S. 220 (2006), was a decision by the Supreme Court of the United States involving the due process requirement that a state give notice to an owner before selling his property to satisfy his unpaid taxes. The Court ruled, 5-3, that after a mailed notice was returned unclaimed, a state was required by the Due Process Clause of the Fourteenth Amendment to take additional reasonable steps to notify the owner before the sale could proceed. The Court's opinion was delivered by Chief Justice John G. Roberts, his fourth majority opinion after his confirmation to the Court in 2005 and his first to provoke any dissenting opinions.

The Court had last addressed the issue of notice in Dusenbery v. United States, which held that the government need only take steps reasonably calculated to provide notice even if actual notice is not achieved. The four justices who dissented in Dusenbery formed the majority with Roberts in Jones v. Flowers, distinguishing the prior case on the basis that the government in Dusenbery did not know that its method of notice had failed before the taking occurred. Justice Clarence Thomas, in dissent, believed the Court was instead undermining Dusenbery, which he argued implicitly dictated a result contrary to the majority's decision.

== Background ==
=== Tax delinquency and sale ===
In 1967, Gary Jones purchased a house in Little Rock, Arkansas, in which he lived with his wife until they separated in 1993. Jones then moved into an apartment in Little Rock, and his wife continued to live in the house. Jones paid his mortgage each month for 30 years, and the mortgage company paid Jones' property taxes. However, after Jones paid off his mortgage in 1997, his wife failed to pay the property taxes, and the property was certified as delinquent.

In April 2000, Mark Wilcox, the Arkansas Commissioner of State Lands, attempted to notify Jones of his tax delinquency, and his right to redeem the property, by mailing a certified letter to Jones at the house. The packet of information stated that unless Jones redeemed the property, it would be subject to public sale two years later on April 17, 2002. Nobody was home to sign for the letter, and nobody appeared at the post office to retrieve the letter within the next 15 days. The post office returned the unopened packet to the Commissioner marked "unclaimed."

Two years later, and just a few weeks before the public sale, the Commissioner published a notice of public sale in the Arkansas Democrat-Gazette. No bids were submitted, which permitted the State to negotiate a private sale of the property. Several months later, Linda Flowers submitted a purchase offer. The Commissioner mailed another certified letter to Jones at the house, attempting to notify him that his house would be sold to Flowers if he did not pay his taxes. Like the first letter, the second was also returned to the Commissioner marked "unclaimed." Flowers subsequently purchased the house at approximately a quarter of its fair market value. Immediately after the 30-day period for postsale redemption passed, Flowers had an unlawful detainer notice delivered to the property. The notice was served on Jones' daughter, who contacted Jones and notified him of the unpaid taxes and the tax sale.

=== State court proceedings ===
Jones filed a lawsuit in Pulaski County Circuit Court against the Commissioner and Flowers, alleging that the Commissioner's failure to provide notice of the tax sale and of Jones' right to redeem resulted in the taking of his property without due process. The Commissioner and Flowers moved for summary judgment on the ground that the two unclaimed letters sent by the Commissioner were a constitutionally adequate attempt at notice, and Jones filed a cross-motion for summary judgment. The trial court granted summary judgment in favor of the Commissioner and Flowers, concluding that the Arkansas tax sale statute, which set forth the notice procedure followed by the Commissioner, complied with constitutional due process requirements.

Jones appealed, and the Arkansas Supreme Court affirmed the trial court's judgment. The court noted Supreme Court precedent stating that due process does not require actual notice, and that attempting to provide notice by certified mail satisfied due process in the circumstances presented.

== Opinion of the Court ==
The Supreme Court granted certiorari to resolve a conflict among the Circuits and state supreme courts concerning whether the Due Process Clause requires the government to take additional reasonable steps to notify a property owner when notice of a tax sale is returned undelivered. The United States Solicitor General was granted leave to participate as amicus curiae, and argued in support of the Commissioner's position.

In a five-justice opinion delivered by Chief Justice John G. Roberts, the Court reversed the Arkansas Supreme Court and ruled that, under the circumstances, the State's sale of Jones' property violated due process. It held that "when mailed notice of a tax sale is returned unclaimed, the State must take additional reasonable steps to attempt to provide notice to the property owner before selling his property, if it is practicable to do so." Justice Clarence Thomas filed a dissent, arguing that the State's attempts went beyond any requirements the Court's prior precedents had established.

=== Roberts' majority opinion ===
Chief Justice Roberts wrote that considering the "extraordinary power" the State is exerting against a property owner, "[i]t is not too much to insist that the State do a bit more to attempt to let him know about it when the notice letter addressed to him is returned unclaimed." Though the method of using certified mail was in itself reasonably calculated to give notice, the knowledge that the State gained when the mail was returned unclaimed obligated it to take additional reasonable steps. However, "[i]n response to the returned form suggesting that Jones had not received notice that he was about to lose his property, the State did—nothing." The Court believed that "someone who actually wanted to alert Jones that he was in danger of losing his house would do more when the attempted notice letter was returned unclaimed, and there was more that reasonably could be done."

==== Reasonably calculated to give notice ====
The Due Process Clause of the Fourteenth Amendment to the United States Constitution requires a State to provide an owner with notice and an opportunity to be heard before it may take his property and sell it for unpaid taxes. The Court had recently ruled in Dusenbery v. United States, 534 U.S. 161 (2002) that the government did not violate due process by sending notice to the jail where the property owner was imprisoned and allowing a prison official to sign for it, even though the prisoner never actually received the notice. Dusenbery established that due process did not require actual notice prior to a governmental taking of property, but instead only that the government attempt to give notice by a method "reasonably calculated, under all the circumstances," to inform all interested parties.

Based on Dusenbery as well as earlier cases, the State argued that once it provided notice reasonably calculated to apprise Jones of the impending tax sale by mailing him a certified letter, due process was satisfied. However, the Court pointed out that in each of those prior cases, the government had subsequently heard nothing back indicating that its attempts had failed. In Dusenbery, for example, the government knew that someone at the prison had signed for the letter. The knowledge that notice had failed was instead "a new wrinkle," and the question before the Court was therefore whether that knowledge constituted a circumstance that alters what notice is required. The Court believed that most federal courts of appeals and state supreme courts to have addressed this issue have decided that the government must do something more when it learns its attempt at notice has failed before it can sell real property in a tax sale. Many states also require by statute more than a simple notice by mail to the delinquent owner.

The means by which service of notice is attempted "must be such as one desirous of actually informing the absentee might reasonably adopt to accomplish it," Whether a particular method is adequate is determined by balancing the "interest of the State" against "the individual interest sought to be protected by the Fourteenth Amendment." In this case, the Court, emphasized, "we evaluate the adequacy of notice prior to the State extinguishing a property owner's interest in a home," which the Court considered "an important and irreversible prospect."

The Court did not believe that someone who actually desired to inform the owner would do nothing further when a certified letter is returned unclaimed, and satirized the State's position by analogy. "If the Commissioner prepared a stack of letters to mail to delinquent taxpayers, handed them to the postman, and then watched as the departing postman accidentally dropped the letters down a storm drain, one would certainly expect the Commissioner's office to prepare a new stack of letters and send them again. No one ‘desirous of actually informing’ the owners would simply shrug his shoulders as the letters disappeared and say ‘I tried.’ Failure to follow up would be unreasonable, despite the fact that the letters were reasonably calculated to reach their intended recipients when delivered to the postman."

The Court noted prior cases in which the government had been required to take notice of "unique information about an intended recipient" that it had known prior to its attempt at notice. In Robinson v. Hanrahan, 409 U.S. 38 (1972), the Court had ruled that notice of forfeiture proceedings sent to a vehicle owner's home address was inadequate when the State knew that the property owner was in prison. Similarly, in Covey v. Town of Somers, 351 U.S. 141 (1956), the Court held that notice of foreclosure by mailing, posting, and publication was inadequate when town officials knew that the property owner was incompetent and without a guardian's protection. The Court did not see a distinction between having such knowledge prior to attempting notice and having such knowledge after notice was sent but prior to the actual taking. Just as the government's knowledge in Robinson and Covey that notice pursuant to the normal procedure was ineffective triggered an obligation on the government's part to take additional steps to effect notice, the government's knowledge should similarly be taken into account in assessing the adequacy of notice in this case. Though Justice Thomas’ dissent characterized the State's knowledge that its notice was ineffective as "learned long after the fact," the Court pointed out that it had actually received the returned notice within three weeks; under Arkansas law, it had two years before it could proceed with the sale.

==== Additional reasonable steps ====
The Court proceeded to analyze whether there were additional reasonable steps that the State could have practicably taken to notify Jones of the tax sale. If there were such options for the State, the newspaper advertisement announcing the sale could not render notice adequate, because notice by publication was only permissible when it was not possible or practicable to give more adequate notice. If there were no such options for the State, "it cannot be faulted for doing nothing."

The Court believed that resending the notice by regular mail would have been a reasonable step, given that the return of the certified letter meant either that Jones was not home when the postman called, or that he no longer lived at that home. Regular mail would allow the letter to be left without a signature, and it would have made it possible for the letter to be forwarded to him. The State also could have simply posted a notice on the front door of the home or addressed the mail to "occupant," which are steps that most states require in their tax sale statutes. The Court believed that in either case, the current occupant of the home would be likely to read the notice and attempt to alert the owner, because a change in ownership would directly affect them. The Court observed that Jones had actually first learned of the tax sale after he was alerted by one of the occupants.

Though the Commissioner argued that even those additional steps were burdensome, the Court countered that it had instead undertaken "the burden and expense of purchasing a newspaper advertisement, conducting an auction, and then negotiating a private sale of the property." The Court considered the assertion of burden further undermined by the requirement in Arkansas that notice to homestead owners be accomplished by personal service if certified mail is returned, and the fact that Arkansas transfers the cost of notice to the taxpayer or the tax sale purchaser, The Commissioner offered no estimate of how many notice letters are returned, and the Court believed that nothing supported the dissent's assertion that the Commissioner must physically locate "tens of thousands of properties every year."

The Court also disagreed with the U.S. Solicitor General's argument that requiring further effort when the government learns that notice was unsuccessful would cause the government to favor methods "that do not generate additional information," such as relying entirely on regular mail instead of certified mail. The Court considered this unlikely because the government is always being asked to prove that notice is sent and received, and the documentation that certified mail provides gives the State protection against false claims that notice was never received. The Court noted that this protection "comes at a price—the State also learns when notice has not been received," information that under the circumstances of this case, the State cannot simply ignore.

The Commissioner also argued that further measures were not required because Jones had a legal obligation to keep his address updated, that he was on inquiry notice after failing to receive a tax bill and pay his property taxes, and that he was obliged to ensure that the occupants of his property would alert him if it were in jeopardy. Though acknowledging that Jones should have been more diligent regarding his property, the Court rejected that any of those conditions could amount to a forfeiture of his due process right to receive adequate notice. The method of certified mail furthermore made it impossible for the occupant to notify Jones, because only Jones could have signed for the letter.

The Court clarified that it was not its responsibility to dictate what form of service that the government should adopt, or to attempt to redraft a State's notice statute. Instead, "[t]he State can determine how to proceed in response to our conclusion that notice was inadequate here." The Court considered it sufficient for it to determine "that additional reasonable steps were available for Arkansas to employ before taking Jones' property."

=== Thomas' dissent ===
Justice Thomas dissented, arguing that under Court precedent, the State's notice attempts clearly satisfied due process requirements. He wrote that the title to property should not turn on "wrinkles" (as the Court had characterized the issue in this case) that Thomas believed were caused by Jones' own failure to protect his property. He further added that "[t]he meaning of the Constitution should not turn on the antics of tax evaders and scofflaws."

According to Thomas, the Court's inquiry should have ended with the conclusion that the State's chosen method of notice by certified mail was reasonably calculated to inform Jones of proceedings affecting his property interest. He argued that this finding was "reinforced by the well-established presumption that individuals, especially those owning property, act in their own interest." The State was accordingly free to assume that the address it had on record was correct and up-to-date, or that he had left a caretaker at the house who would inform him of the notice. Whether a method is reasonably calculated to give notice is furthermore determined at the time the notice is sent, a principle Thomas believed followed from Court precedent. He argued that the Court had abandoned this by basing its decision on information that was unavailable when notice was sent, and that all of its suggested reasonable methods were "entirely the product of post hoc considerations."

Thomas believed the Court's holding in Dusenbery that actual notice is not required implied that the government is not required to take additional steps when it becomes aware that its attempt at notice has failed. He accordingly characterized the Court's ruling as "little more than a thinly veiled attack on Dusenbery." Thomas stated that the majority's logic would require a State to consider additional means every time a doubt is raised as to whether notice has been achieved, imposing a requirement with "no natural end point" that Thomas thought effectively required "something close to actual notice."

Regarding the Court's "storm drain" hypothetical, Thomas thought it actually raised a more difficult question of "when notice is sent—at the precise moment the Commissioner places the mail in the postal carrier's hand or the split second later when he observes the departing carrier drop the mail down the storm drain. That more difficult question is not before us in this case because Arkansas learned long after the fact that its attempts had been unsuccessful."

Thomas wrote of the Court's proposed alternatives that, "aside from being constitutionally unnecessary, [they] are also burdensome, impractical, and no more likely to effect notice than the methods actually employed by the State." Regular mail lacks the paper trail of certified mail, and Thomas thought it was just as likely that mail addressed to "occupant" would be thrown out as junk mail as opened and read as the Court had speculated. He also stated that the Court had previously concluded that posting notices was "an inherently unreliable method."

Thomas observed that 18,000 parcels of delinquent real estate are certified each year in Arkansas, and that the Court's ruling would accordingly impose a burden on the State of locating thousands of delinquent property owners because of the "inefficiencies caused by delinquent taxpayers." Thomas instead believed that the Arkansas system requiring the property owner to maintain a current address with the state taxing authority was reasonable and sufficient.

== Subsequent developments ==
Jones v. Flowers was characterized as "an almost paradigmatic case pitting an individual against the state." It was also said to be the second decision that year in which Roberts had "expressed frustration with a bureaucratic response to a serious concern."

The case was perceived as an interesting look into the new Roberts Court, as the new Chief Justice chose a decision for his fourth opinion that was contrary to the position of Bush administration lawyers, Justices Scalia and Thomas, "the court's two best-known conservatives," and Justice Anthony Kennedy, who was expected to be the Court's swing vote following the retirement of Justice Sandra Day O'Connor. This was the first majority opinion by Roberts to provoke any dissents.
