= 2001 term United States Supreme Court opinions of Ruth Bader Ginsburg =

The 2001 term of the Supreme Court of the United States began October 1, 2001, and concluded October 6, 2002. This was the ninth term of Associate Justice Ruth Bader Ginsburg's tenure on the Court.
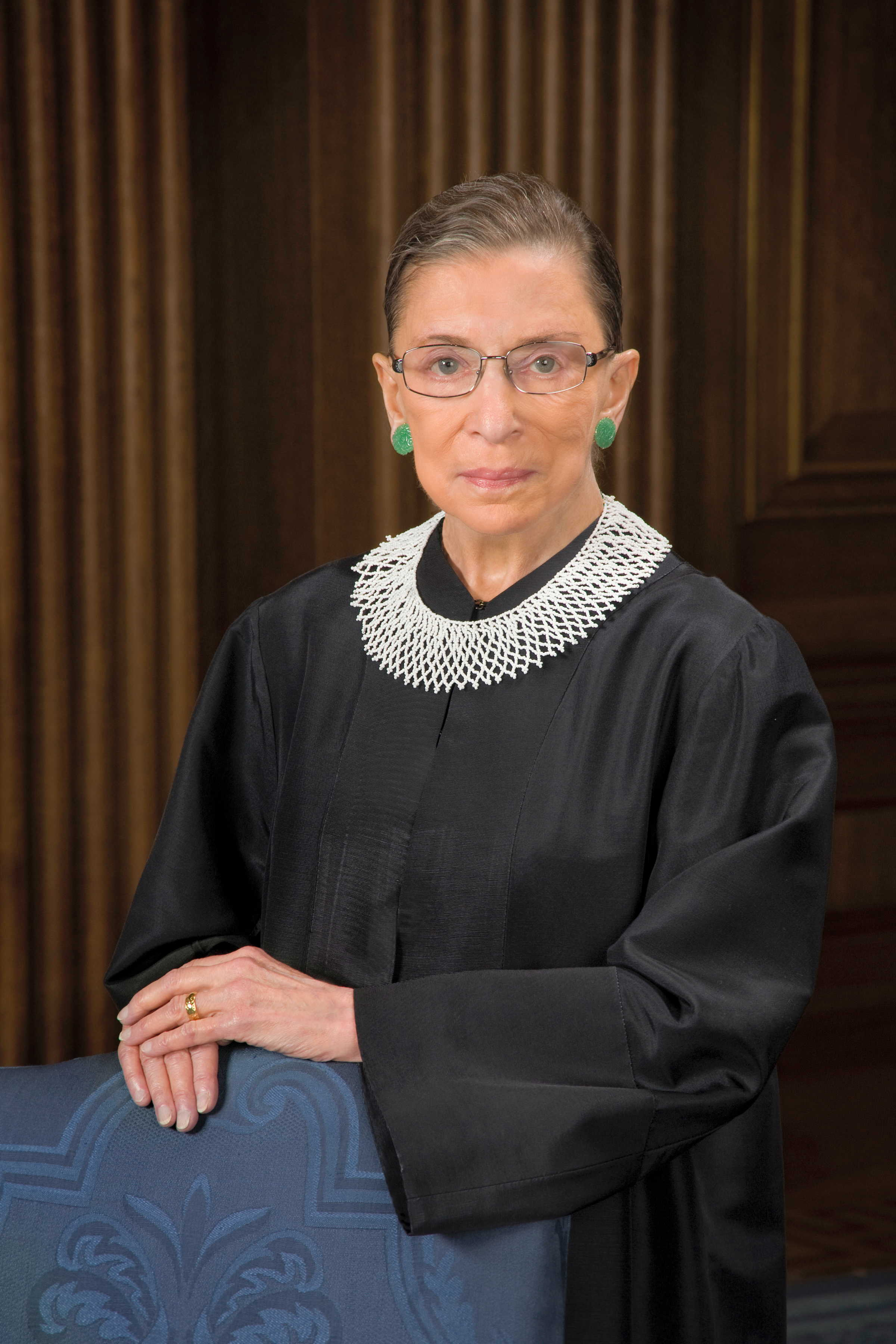

Ruth Bader Ginsburg 2001 term statistics

| 9 | Majority or plurality | 3 | Concurrence | 0 | Other |
| 5 | Dissent | 0 | Concurrence/dissent | Total = | 17 |
| Bench opinions = 16 | | Opinions relating to orders = 1 | | In-chambers opinions = 0 |
| Unanimous opinions: 2 | | Most joined by: Stevens, Souter, Breyer (12) | | Least joined by: Scalia (3) |

| Type | Case | Citation | Issues | Joined by | Other opinions |
|---|---|---|---|---|---|
| | United States Postal Service v. Gregor | 534 U.S. 1 (2001) | | | |
| | TRW Inc. v. Andrews | 534 U.S. 19 (2001) | | Rehnquist, Stevens, O'Connor, Kennedy, Souter, Breyer | |
| | Dusenbery v. United States | 534 U.S. 161 (2002) | | Stevens, Souter, Breyer | |
| | Great-West Life & Annuity Ins. Co. v. Knudson | 534 U.S. 204 (2002) | | Stevens, Souter, Breyer | |
| | Lee v. Kemna | 534 U.S. 362 (2002) | | Rehnquist, Stevens, O'Connor, Souter, Breyer | |
| | Wisconsin Dept. of Health and Family Servs. v. Blumer | 534 U.S. 473 (2002) | | Rehnquist, Kennedy, Souter, Thomas, Breyer | |
| | Porter v. Nussle | 534 U.S. 516 (2002) | | Unanimous | |
| | Raygor v. Regents of Univ. of Minn. | 534 U.S. 533 (2002) | | | |
| | Alabama v. Shelton | 535 U.S. 654 (2002) | | Stevens, O'Connor, Souter, Breyer | |
| | Gisbrecht v. Barnhart | 535 U.S. 789 (2002) | | Rehnquist, Stevens, O'Connor, Kennedy, Souter, Thomas, Breyer | |
| | Holmes Group, Inc. v. Vornado Air Circulation Systems, Inc | 535 U.S. 826 (2002) | | O'Connor | |
| | Franconia Associates v. United States | 536 U.S. 129 (2002) | | Unanimous | |
| | City of Columbus v. Ours Garage & Wrecker Service, Inc. | 536 U.S. 424 (2002) | | Rehnquist, Stevens, Kennedy, Souter, Thomas, Breyer | |
| | Ring v. Arizona | 536 U.S. 584 (2002) | | Stevens, Scalia, Kennedy, Souter, Thomas | |
| | Republican Party of Minnesota v. White | 536 U.S. 765 (2002) | | Stevens, Souter, Breyer | |
| | Board of Ed. of Independent School Dist. No. 92 of Pottawatomie Cty. v. Earls | 536 U.S. 822 (2002) | | Stevens, O'Connor, Souter | |
| | Patterson v. Texas | 536 U.S. 984 (2002) | death penalty | Breyer | |
Ginsburg dissented from the Court's denial of a stay of the execution of an individual who was 17 when he committed the capital offense, believing the Court should revisit the issue of whether it was constitutional to impose the death penalty for crimes committed when the offender was a minor. Stevens also filed a dissent. The Court ruled three years later that the Eighth Amendment prohibited such death sentences, in Roper v. Simmons, 543 U.S. 551 (2005).
