= 2001 term United States Supreme Court opinions of William Rehnquist =

The 2001 term of the Supreme Court of the United States began October 1, 2001, and concluded October 6, 2002. This was the thirtieth term of Chief Justice William Rehnquist's tenure on the Court and the sixteenth term as Chief Justice.
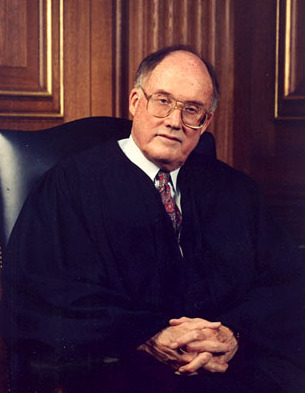

William Rehnquist 2001 term statistics

10	Majority or plurality	0	Concurrence	1	Other
5	Dissent	0	Concurrence/dissent	Total =	16
Bench opinions = 15		Opinions relating to orders = 0		In-chambers opinions = 1
Unanimous opinions: 3		Most joined by: Scalia (13)		Least joined by: Stevens, Breyer (4)

Type	Case	Citation	Issues	Joined by	Other opinions
	Correctional Services Corp. v. Malesko	534 U.S. 61 (2001)		O'Connor, Scalia, Kennedy, Thomas	
	United States v. Knights (2001)	534 U.S. 112 (2001)		Unanimous	
	Dusenbery v. United States	534 U.S. 161 (2002)		O'Connor, Scalia, Kennedy, Thomas	
	Kelly v. South Carolina	534 U.S. 246 (2002)		Kennedy	
	United States v. Arvizu	534 U.S. 266 (2002)		Unanimous	
	Department of Housing and Urban Development v. Rucker	535 U.S. 125 (2002)		Stevens, O'Connor, Scalia, Kennedy, Souter, Thomas, Ginsburg	
	Hoffman Plastic Compounds, Inc. v. NLRB	535 U.S. 137 (2002)		O'Connor, Scalia, Kennedy, Thomas	
	Ashcroft v. Free Speech Coalition	535 U.S. 234 (2002)		Scalia	
	Tahoe-Sierra Preservation Council v. Tahoe Regional Planning Agency	535 U.S. 302 (2002)	takings • land use regulation	Scalia, Thomas	
	United States v. Cotton	535 U.S. 625 (2002)		Unanimous	
	Bell v. Cone	535 U.S. 685 (2002)		O'Connor, Scalia, Kennedy, Souter, Thomas, Ginsburg, Breyer	
	Bartlett v. Stephenson	535 U.S. 1301 (2002)	legislative redistricting		
Rehnquist denied the application of North Carolina officials to stay a decision of the North Carolina Supreme Court invalidating the 2001 state legislative redistricting plan under the State Constitution.
	Watchtower Society v. Village of Stratton	536 U.S. 150 (2002)	First Amendment • door-to-door advocacy		
	Gonzaga University v. Doe	536 U.S. 273 (2002)		O'Connor, Scalia, Kennedy, Thomas	
	Atkins v. Virginia	536 U.S. 304 (2002)	death penalty	Scalia, Thomas	
	Zelman v. Simmons-Harris	536 U.S. 639 (2002)	First Amendment • school vouchers	O'Connor, Scalia, Kennedy, Thomas	
