= Wells effect =

The Wells effect describes an empirical disconnect between people's judgment of guilt in a trial setting, and both the mathematical and subjective probability involving guilt. This finding shows that evidence that makes a defendant's guilt more or less probable will not necessarily make a guilty verdict more or less likely, which suggests that the judgments made in courts are not governed by rational decision making.

== Origins ==
This behavioral effect was first established in a series of experiments by psychologist Gary L. Wells. This study examined the difference between how mock jurors judged naked statistics (statistical evidence that is unrelated to the specific case) and other forms of evidence, and found that a simple probability-threshold model (i.e., that jurors decide guilt when the subjective probability of guilt crosses a threshold value) cannot account for juror behavior.

The experiments were based on variants of the hypothetical Blue Bus Case, which first appeared in the legal literature to describe the unsuitability of naked statistics in trial. In Wells's studies, participants were asked to rule on a case in which a woman had watched her dog get struck by a bus and killed, but was unable to identify the bus. One group of participants (in the rate of traffic case) was presented with evidence that the Blue Bus Company was responsible for 80% of the traffic on the road, and the competing Gray Bus Company was responsible for the other 20%; a second group (in the weight attendant case) was presented with the testimony of a weight attendant who made a record indicating that a Blue Bus was on the road at a time corresponding to the accident, and that of a second witness who testified that this record was known to be incorrect 20% of the time. When asked to guess the probability that the Blue Bus Company was responsible for the accident, participants from both groups correctly reported an average 80% chance. However, when asked to make a determination of guilt in the case, those in the first group made a judgment against the Blue Bus Company only 8.2% of the time, while those in the second group found the Blue Bus Company liable in 67.1% of the cases.

== Variants and proposed mechanisms ==
The original study found evidence for a process Wells described as "fact-to-evidence reasoning". A juror engaged in such reasoning would ignore evidence unless the evidence itself can (or cannot) be supported by the judgment of the ultimate fact. I.e., jurors would ignore naked statistics (such as the rate of traffic) because the identity of the responsible bus wouldn't prove or disprove the statistics, but jurors would consider the weight attendant's testimony because his testimony could be supported (or not) by the identity of the responsible bus. In two additional experiments, participants were presented with the tire tracks case or the tire tracks-belief case. Both cases relied on the testimony of a transportation official who examined the prints of tire tracks and compared them to the buses from the two companies. In the tire tracks case, the official testified that the tracks matched 80% of the Blue Bus Company buses, and 20% of the Gray Bus Company buses. In the tire tracks-belief case, the official testified that he used a tire-matching technique that provides correct results 80% of the time, and he believed that a specific blue bus was responsible for the accident. As before, participants reported an average 80% probability that a blue bus struck the dog in both cases. However, the tire tracks participants tended not to judge against the Blue Bus Company, while the tire tracks-belief participants did.

Subsequent research has led to the proposal of an "ease-of-simulation" mechanism being responsible for the effect. Niedermeier, Kerr, and Messé (1999) argued that jurors in Wells's experiments ruled in favor of the Blue Bus Company when they had an easier time imagining that the Gray Bus Company was responsible for the accident. They replicated the Wells Effect but also included manipulations that were meant to make it easier to imagine that a gray bus was responsible. For instance, their partial-match/simulation case was similar to Wells's tire tracks-belief case, except the witness was cross-examined by the defense and admitted that it was possible that a gray bus caused the accident. The researchers also probed participants with new questions meant to measure the ease of this mental simulation (e.g., "on an 11-point scale, how easy it was to imagine that a Grey Bus Company bus ran over the dog"). In these experiments, participants were less likely to make a judgment against the Blue Bus Company in cases where they had an easier time imagining that a gray bus was responsible for the accident, even though they reported an identical probability that a blue bus was responsible.

More recent work has endorsed a model of juror decision making that includes subjective probability of guilt as only one of its inputs. Arkes, Shoots-Reinhard, & Mayes (2012) identified factors that influenced verdicts only by influencing subjective probability, and factors that influenced verdicts without changing subjective probability. For example, the addition of a non-diagnostic witness (whose testimony was shown to be unreliable during cross-examination) influenced verdicts but not subjective probability. On the other hand, negative evidence (i.e., evidence that the Gray Bus Company was not responsible) caused participants to erroneously make lower probability judgements that a blue bus struck the dog, and resulted in a concordant decrease in guilty verdicts. Across three experiments, the researchers also measured participants' level of agreement with the statement, "it is unfair to blame the Blue Bus Company unless you can prove that they hit the dog; just stating what is likely isn’t enough evidence, the plaintiff must show that they were directly involved in the accident." Levels of agreement were strongly correlated with verdicts in favor of the Blue Bus Company across case variants. This body of work also supports an earlier non-empirical argument positing that jurors would object to the use of naked statistics on the grounds of morality, because doing so would deny the autonomy of the defendant; the morality of basing a decision on statistical evidence can influence verdicts without influencing the subjective probability of guilt.

== See also ==
- Heuristics in judgment and decision-making
- Bounded rationality
- Base rate fallacy
