= Amy Bradfield Douglass =

American social psychologist

- Occupations: Researcher, Professor

Academic background
- Education: Iowa State University

Academic work
- Discipline: Social Psychologist
- Sub-discipline: Eyewitness testimony, jury decision-making, memory

Amy Bradfield Douglass is a social psychologist whose research focus on the intersection of psychology and law specifically concerning eyewitness testimony. Douglass is a Whitehouse Professor of Psychology at Bates College. Douglass is also a publish author of two textbooks. She is most well known for her research, and is recognized as an expert for trial consulting.

== Education and career ==
Douglass received her B.A. in Psychology from Williams College with honors in 1996. She attended graduate school at Iowa State University (ISU) and acquired her Masters of Science in Psychology (1998) as well as her Ph.D. in social psychology (2001). At ISU she was a member of Gary L. Wells research lab, the psychology & law lab. The Principal Investigator of this lab is no longer Wells, it is now being run by Andrew Smith. While a research assistant they worked on a study which examined what is known as the Post Identification-Feedback effect. Wells was Douglass's graduate thesis advisor and some of their work was based on Douglass's thesis.

After she received her degree she became a professor at Bates College. At Bates College, she teaches higher-level psychology courses such as psychology and the law, as well as statistics courses. Williams College designates Douglass as an eyewitness expert for trial consulting as recommended by Saul Kassin.

=== Editorial work ===
Douglass has been an associate editor of the Law & Human Behavior journal which is published by the American Psychological Association (APA). In 2019 the APA published an issue in the Law & Human Behavior Journal thanking the team of editors of which, Douglass is a part, for the work they have done in increasing the journal's impact factor.

=== Community outreach ===
Douglass is a cosponsor through Bates College of a monthly series titled The Great Falls Forum located at the Lewiston Public Library. On October 19, 2017, she presented information on eyewitness identification and lineup procedures. In this forum, she demonstrated how an image can be seen as a young or elderly woman. This demonstration showcased the limitations of human memory and perception. Douglass is also an active member in other organizations, she has been a member of the Center for Wisdom's Women since 2021. The center focuses on creating a healing and enriching environment for women. Douglass is also on the board for the Society for Applied Research in Memory and Cognition (SARMAC) as their secretary-treasurer during the 2022–2025 term.

== Research ==
Douglass's research focuses on eyewitness testimony. As a graduate student she worked with Gary Wells in discovering the now well known 'Post Identification-Feedback' effect. This is when information (confirming-feedback or disconfirming-feedback) given to the witness post the identification of the suspect distorts the witnesses' recollection of the identification. Then in 1999 Douglass and Wells continued investigating the Post Identification-Feedback effect and if there are any moderators of this effect. In this study they suggest that the feedback effect could be an interpreted as a self-perception effect. They found the solution to this effect is to use proper lineup procedures such as using a blind lineup. In 2000 while Douglass is a graduate student at ISU, Wells and Douglass investigate the criteria issued by the U.S Supreme Court regarding eyewitness identifications (Neil v. Briggers 1972). This article was based on Douglass's thesis while she was in her Master's program and Wells supervised it. They found that individuals incorporated aspects of Briggers criteria when they made assessments of the eyewitness's accuracy.

Douglass still continues to research the Post-Identification feedback effect, in 2014 they analyzed its theoretical and policy implications, 15 years after it had been identified. Then in 2019 she analyzed what the literature looked like after 20 years and then applied how it factored in to supreme court decisions. In 2022 Douglass was the recipient of the Fulbright Scholarship, where they culturally compared Japanese and American eyewitnesses to see if it impacted their memories.

Douglass continues to research eyewitness information, with some of her more recent work examining factors that influence identifications such as identification speed.

== Books ==
- Brewer, N., & Douglass, A. B. (2019). Psychological science and the law. The Guilford Press.
- Heilbrun, K., Greene, E., & Douglass, A. B. (2024). Wrightsman's Psychology and the Legal System (10th edition). Cengage.
