= Criminal defense lawyer =

Legal specialization

A criminal defense lawyer is a lawyer (mostly barristers) specializing in the defense of individuals and companies charged with criminal activity. Some criminal defense lawyers are privately retained, while others are employed by the various jurisdictions with criminal courts for appointment to represent indigent persons; the latter are generally called public defenders. The terminology is imprecise because each jurisdiction may have different practices with various levels of input from country to country. Some jurisdictions use a rotating system of appointments, with judges appointing a private practice attorney or firm for each case.

== United States ==
In the United States, criminal defense lawyers deal with the issues surrounding an arrest, a criminal investigation, criminal charges, sentencing, appeals, and post-trial issues. Criminal defense lawyers strive to minimize the harsh consequences of an arrest and deliver quality legal representation to persons accused of committing a criminal offense. They could work for the local, state, or federal government or they could work for private law firms. The defense lawyers could also have their own practice and handle multiple criminal cases.

An arrest simply means a police officer, federal agent, or judge believes probable cause exists that a person committed a crime. Since an arrest is usually made by law enforcement, the arrest often is for a criminal charge that has not been levied or verified by an attorney or judge. Criminal defense lawyers also deal with the substantive issues of the crimes with which their clients are charged. Criminal defense lawyers may also help clients before charges have been filed by a prosecuting attorney: this is done when someone believes he or she is being investigated.

The accused may hire a criminal defense lawyer to help with counsel and representation dealing with police or other investigators, perform their own investigation, and at times present exculpatory evidence that negates potential charges by the prosecutor. Criminal defense lawyers in the United States who are employed by governmental entities such as counties, state governments, and the federal government are often referred to as public defenders or court-appointed attorneys.

A considerable aspect of this work requires the US criminal defense lawyer to have a clear understanding of the United States Constitution, and specifically the Fourth Amendment against unlawful searches and seizures. The Fifth prescribes a defendant's right to remain silent. The Sixth relates to a defendant's rights at trial. It guarantees a defendant the opportunity to confront and cross-examine witnesses, in addition to the right to be represented by counsel. The Sixth Amendment also allows a defendant to know the nature of the accusation against them. All of the Amendments to the United States Constitution are guaranteed to the criminal accused against the states via the Fourteenth Amendment. Thus, a criminal defense lawyer must understand each of these rights. Initial work on any criminal case involves review of the charges and the claimed facts, and analysis of constitutional violations, the prima facie burden of the prosecution, defenses, and affirmative defenses; as well as potential sentence and sentencing issues. Early stages of a criminal case may involve a grand jury or preliminary hearing to determine if there exists probable cause for the case to continue. A violation of the Fourth or Fifth Amendment, or other illegally obtained evidence could result in evidence being inadmissible at trial. Accordingly, a criminal defense lawyer often spends a considerable amount of time reviewing all documentation to determine if the case can be won on constitutional grounds due to illegal conduct by the government.

If there are no constitutional violations, much of the work of a criminal defense attorney then turns to trial preparation. Any proposed settlement agreement must be compared to the best judgment about the outcome after trial. A criminal defense lawyer will usually discuss potential plea bargains with the prosecuting attorney, as an alternative to exercising the defendant's trial right and other rights. Plea agreements, when made, can be characterized as either charge agreements (often involving a less serious charge), sentencing agreements (involving a lesser sentence), or both.

Criminal defense lawyers are typically defending people with misdemeanor or felony charges. A misdemeanor generally refers to criminal activity that is punishable by one year or less in the local jail. A felony typically refers to criminal activity that is punishable by more than one year in the prison system. Many states have "wobblers", which refers to criminal activity that is charged as a felony, but has a possibility of being reduced to a misdemeanor. In matters involving a wobbler, many times a reputable lawyer can either have the felony reduced to a misdemeanor or have the felony appear to be a misdemeanor so that the felony can be reduced to a misdemeanor at a later date, which may be good strategy since the typical felony cannot be expunged.

The initial process of becoming a criminal defense attorney is similar to becoming a lawyer practicing in any other legal practice area. To become a criminal defense lawyer, a person will typically complete their undergraduate degree, and then attend and graduate from a law school. After graduating law school and passing the bar examination for that particular state or jurisdiction, the new lawyer will be sworn in as a member of that bar and can then begin practicing in the field of criminal law. However, many reputable criminal defense attorneys spend some time after being admitted to the bar working under the mentor-ship of an experienced attorney, often in a prosecutors office or a public defenders office.

== United Kingdom ==
In the United Kingdom, criminal defense lawyers require an undergraduate law degree and authorization by the Solicitors Regulation Authority.
