= Robinson v. Hanrahan =

- Supreme Court of the United States

Decided October 24, 1972
- Full case name: Robinson v. Hanrahan
- Citations: 409 U.S. 38 (more)

Case history
- Prior: People ex rel. Hanrahan v. One 1965 Oldsmobile, 52 Ill. 2d 37, 284 N. E. 2d 646 (1972).

Holding
- A due-process notice is not adequate when the state has actual knowledge that the recipient has no access to the address it was sent to.

Court membership
- Chief Justice Warren E. Burger Associate Justices William O. Douglas · William J. Brennan Jr. Potter Stewart · Byron White; Thurgood Marshall · Harry Blackmun; Lewis F. Powell Jr. · William Rehnquist

Case opinion
- Per curiam

Robinson v. Hanrahan, 409 U.S. 38 (1972), was a United States Supreme Court case in which the court held that a due-process notice is not adequate when the state has actual knowledge that the recipient has no access to the address it was sent to.

== Background ==
On June 16, 1970, Robinson was arrested on a charge of armed robbery and, immediately thereafter, the state of Illinois instituted civil forfeiture proceedings against Robinson's car pursuant to the Illinois vehicle forfeiture statute, Ill. Rev. Stat., c. 38, § 36-1. Robinson was held in custody in the Cook County jail from June 16, 1970, to October 7, 1970, awaiting trial. Nevertheless, the State mailed notice of the pending forfeiture proceedings, not to the jail facility, but to Robinson's home address as listed in the records of the Illinois Secretary of State. Robinson, who remained in custody throughout the forfeiture proceedings, did not receive the notice until his release. After an ex parte hearing on August 19, 1970, the circuit court of Cook County ordered the forfeiture and sale of Robinson's car.

Upon learning of the forfeiture after his release, Robinson filed a motion for rehearing, requesting that the order of forfeiture be set aside because the manner of notice did not comport with the requirements of the Due Process Clause of the Fourteenth Amendment. The circuit court of Cook County denied the motion. On appeal, the Supreme Court of Illinois, three justices dissenting, held that, in light of the in rem nature of the proceedings, substituted service as used by the State did not deny appellant due process of law.

The Supreme Court granted certiorari.

== Opinion of the court ==
The Supreme Court issued an opinion on October 24, 1972.

== Later developments ==
In Dusenbery v. United States (2002), the Supreme Court held that a letter sent to the jail that an incarcerated person is held within does not actually need to be provided to the incarcerated person in order for due process to be satisfied.
