= Ham v. South Carolina =

- Supreme Court of the United States

Argued November 6, 1972 Decided January 17, 1973
- Full case name: Gene Ham v. State of South Carolina
- Citations: 409 U.S. 524 (more) 93 S. Ct. 848; 35 L. Ed. 2d 46; 1973 U.S. LEXIS 115

Case history
- Prior: The General Sessions Court of Florence County convicted Gene Ham of drug possession. The South Carolina Supreme Court, 256 S.C. 1, 180 S.E.2d 628 (1971), affirmed. The United States Supreme Court, 404 U.S. 1057, 92 S. Ct. 744, 30 L. Ed. 2d 745 (1972), granted certiorari.

Holding
- The trial court's refusal to question the jurors as to their racial bias after petitioner's timely request denied the petitioner a fair trial in violation of the Due Process Clause of the Fourteenth Amendment. South Carolina Supreme Court reversed and remanded.

Court membership
- Chief Justice Warren E. Burger Associate Justices William O. Douglas · William J. Brennan Jr. Potter Stewart · Byron White; Thurgood Marshall · Harry Blackmun; Lewis F. Powell Jr. · William Rehnquist

Case opinions
- Majority: Rehnquist, joined by Burger, Brennan, Stewart, White, Blackmun, Powell
- Concur/dissent: Douglas
- Concur/dissent: Marshall

Laws applied
- U.S. Const. amend. XIV

Ham v. South Carolina, 409 U.S. 524 (1973), was a United States Supreme Court decision concerning examinations of prospective jurors during voir dire. The Court held that the trial court's failure to "have the jurors interrogated on the issue of racial bias" violated the petitioner's due process right under the Fourteenth Amendment. This right does not extend to any question of bias, but it does not preclude questions of relevant biases.

== Background of the case ==
Gene Ham was a black man who was arrested on May 15, 1970, in Florence, South Carolina, due to four outstanding warrants that charged him with possession of drugs. After his arrest, police took Ham to the Florence city jail and searched him. This search produced marijuana, but Ham claimed that police had framed him because of his involvement with the civil rights movement. Nonetheless, Ham was subsequently charged with a fifth arrest warrant. Before Ham's trial, during voir dire, Ham sought to ask the following four sets of questions of the potential jurors:

1. Would you fairly try this case on the basis of the evidence and disregarding the defendant’s race?
2. You have no prejudice against negroes? Against black people? You would not be influenced by the use of the term ’black’?
3. Would you disregard the fact that this defendant wears a beard in deciding this case?
4. Did you watch the television show about the local drug problem a few days ago when a local policeman appeared for a long time? Have you heard about that show? Have you read or heard about recent newspaper articles to the effect that the local drug problem is bad? Would you try this case solely on the basis of the evidence presented in this courtroom? Would you be influenced by the circumstances that the prosecution’s witness, a police officer, has publicly spoken on TV about drugs?

The trial judge refused to ask these questions, ruling that they were not relevant. Instead, the judge asked the jurors only the following three basic questions specifically required by South Carolina State Law, S.C. Code § 38-202 (1962):

1. Have you formed or expressed any opinion as to the guilt or innocence of the defendant, Gene Ham?
2. Are you conscious of any bias or prejudice for or against him?
3. Can you give the State and the defendant a fair and impartial trial?

At the conclusion of his trial, Ham was found guilty of possession of marijuana, which was a violation of South Carolina State Law, S. C. Code § 32-1506 (1962). Ham was sentenced to eighteen months in prison.

Ham appealed his conviction to the Supreme Court of South Carolina in State v. Ham, 256 S.C. 1 (1971). One of the twelve issues that Ham raised on appeal was that the trial judge erred by refusing to ask Ham’s proposed voir dire questions. The South Carolina Supreme Court determined that the three basic questions asked were in compliance with South Carolina state law, S.C. § 38-202 (1962) at the time. The court stated that Ham failed to carry his burden of showing that other questions should have been asked to assure a fair and impartial jury. The court also found that there was no abuse of discretion by the trial judge. Ham then petitioned the United States Supreme Court to review of the decision of the South Carolina Supreme Court, and the United States Supreme Court, 404 U.S. 1057, 92 S. Ct. 744, 30 L. Ed. 2d 745 (1972), granted certiorari.

== Majority opinion ==
Writing for the majority, Justice William Rehnquist first addressed the South Carolina Supreme Court's dissent that concluded that Ham should have been allowed to question the jury based on the precedent set forth in Aldridge v. United States, 283 U.S. 308 (1931). The Court agreed that Aldridge stood for the proposition that trial judges must allow interrogation of veniremen with respect to racial prejudice because of “essential demands of fairness." The majority, however, found that Aldridge lacked any constitutional grounding. As such, the Court conducted an analysis under the Fourteenth Amendment. According to the Court, the principal purpose of the Fourteenth Amendment was to prohibit the States from invidiously discriminating on the basis of race. This purpose, combined with the Fourteenth Amendment's Due Process Clause, properly ensures the “essential demands of fairness.”

Turning to the particulars of Ham's case, the Court noted that voir dire, although subject to the Fourteenth Amendment, is governed by the discretion of the trial court. As such, the trial judge was not required to put the question of racial bias in any particular form or to ask potential jurors any number of questions. For example, the Court addressed the jury instruction concerning beards and determined that such a question was well within the trial court's discretion to allow or disallow. However, given the context of the case, the Court found that the questions regarding racial prejudice were appropriate and necessary.

== Concurrence and dissent ==
Justice William Douglas concurred that the trial judge was constitutionally required to ask about the racial prejudice among the jurors. However, Justice Douglas believed that the trial judge abused his discretion by not allowing the petitioner to ask potential jurors about their prejudice to hair growth. Justice Douglas stated that denying the petitioner the ability to make such an inquiry precluded a trial by a neutral and impartial jury and thereby constituted reversible error. He cited two analogous cases where such reversal was warranted; in Morford v. United States, 339 U.S. 258 (1950), and Dennis v. United States, 339 U.S. 162 (1950), the petitioners were held to have the right to question juries about their potential ties to the Communist Party and the trial court's failure to permit such questions constituted reversible error.

Justice Douglas also referenced Aldridge and concluded that the goal of voir dire was to disclose “prejudices of a serious character”. He then associated hair growth with prejudice of a serious character. He points out that “hair growth is symbolic to many of rebellion against traditional society and disapproval of the way the current power structure handles social problems,” and he further acknowledged that for some “people, nonconventional hair growth symbolizes an undesirable lifestyle characterized by unreliability, dishonesty, lack of moral values, communal (communist) tendencies, and the assumption of drug use.” Douglas concluded that denying a petitioner the right to examine this aspect of prejudice was to also deny him an effective means of voir dire.

Justice Thurgood Marshall concurred that the trial court was constitutionally required to ask about a potential juror's racial prejudice. He further agreed, based on the record, that questions regarding pre-trial publicity were not required. However, he dissented against barring other avenues of inquiry against possible prejudice that are reasonable and relevant. He reasoned that a right to an impartial jury has been fundamental to the American system of justice all the way back to the founding of the United States. This right to impartiality and fairness, he reasoned, was never meant to be limited to certain classes of prejudice, and a juror should avoid prejudging a party based on any factor that is detrimental to that party's position. According to Justice Marshall, this right to an impartial jury carries with it a right to take reasonable steps to ensure that the jury is indeed unprejudiced. The most important of these is the jury challenge. Here Justice Marshall looked to Pointer v. United States, 151 U.S. 396 (1894), where a unanimous Court thought that the right to challenge was "one of the most important of the rights secured to the accused" and that "any system for the empanelling of a jury that [prevents] or embarrasses the full, unrestricted exercise by the accused of that right, must be condemned."

Justice Marshall took care to caution that a party should not be allowed to ask any and every possible question. Nor should a party be given an unlimited opportunity to conduct preliminary voir dire. He recognized the countervailing interests of the state with regard to speedy trials and the avoidance of jury intimidation. Nonetheless, in Justice Marshall’s opinion, the additional fifteen minutes needed to ask the petitioner's questions concerning racial bias would not have greatly burdened the trial court, and thus the trial court abused its discretion.

== Aftermath ==
Since the Ham decision, two cases have further clarified the adequacy of federal voir dire when there is a heightened risk of racial bias: Ristaino v. Ross, 424 U.S. 589 (1976), and Rosales-Lopez v. United States, 451 U.S. 182 (1981). Ristaino revealed that Ham's constitutional rule is narrow in scope. It held that the "mere fact that the victim of the crimes alleged was a white man and the defendants were Negroes" did not constitutionally compel an examination of racial bias. Rosales-Lopez has since clarified the federal standard. The plurality in Rosales-Lopez held that in federal court, refusal to pose questions submitted by the defendant would be "reversible error only where the circumstances of the case indicate that there is a reasonable possibility that racial or ethnic prejudice might have influenced the jury."
