= Griffin v. Wisconsin =

- Supreme Court of the United States

Argued April 20, 1987 Decided June 26, 1987
- Full case name: Griffin v. Wisconsin
- Docket no.: 86-5324
- Citations: 483 U.S. 868 (more)

Court membership
- Chief Justice William Rehnquist Associate Justices William J. Brennan Jr. · Byron White; Thurgood Marshall · Harry Blackmun; John P. Stevens · Sandra Day O'Connor; Antonin Scalia

Case opinions
- Majority: Scalia, joined by Rehnquist, White, Powell, O'Connor
- Dissent: Blackmun, joined by Marshall; Brennan (Parts I-B, I-C); Stevens (Part I-C)
- Dissent: Stevens, joined by Marshall

Laws applied
- U.S. Const. amend. IV

Griffin v. Wisconsin, 483 U.S. 868 (1987), was a case decided by the Supreme Court of the United States on June 26, 1987. The court decided that the warrantless search of a probationer's residence based on "reasonable grounds" in accordance with a state probation regulation did not violate the Fourth Amendment.

== Background ==
After being convicted in a Wisconsin state court of several offenses, Griffin was placed on probation. According to a Wisconsin regulation, any probation officer could search a probationer's residence without a warrant as long as the officer's supervisor approved and that there were "reasonable grounds" to believe that contraband was present. After Griffin's probation officer received information that there might be firearms in his apartment, police searched Griffin's apartment and found a handgun. Griffin was subsequently charged with possession of a firearm by a convicted felon. The state trial court denied Griffin's motion to suppress the evidence obtained and he was convicted. On appeal, both Wisconsin Court of Appeals and Wisconsin Supreme Court affirmed the conviction.

== Result ==
In a 5–4 decision delivered by Justice Scalia, the Court held that the warrantless search of Griffin's residence did not violate the Fourth Amendment as the search was conducted "pursuant to a regulation that itself satisfies the Fourth Amendment's reasonableness requirement under well-established principles." The Court further reasoned that a state's probation system presented " 'special needs' beyond normal law enforcement that may justify departures from the usual warrant and probable cause requirements."

== See also ==
- List of United States Supreme Court cases, volume 483
- Fourth Amendment to the United States Constitution
- List of United States Supreme Court cases by the Rehnquist Court
- Warrantless searches in the United States
- United States v. Knights
