= Manson v. Brathwaite =

- Supreme Court of the United States

Argued November 29, 1976 Decided June 16, 1977
- Full case name: John R. Manson, Commissioner of Correction of Connecticut v. Nowell A. Brathwaite
- Citations: 432 U.S. 98 (more) 97 S.Ct. 2243
- Argument: Oral argument
- Opinion announcement: Opinion announcement

Case history
- Prior: 527 F.2d 363 (2d Cir. 1975)

Questions presented
- Do the 14th and 6th Amendments require the exclusion from a state criminal trial of pretrial identification evidence that is both suggestive and unnecessary?

Holding
- The admission of the evidence did not violate the 14th Amendment.

Court membership
- Chief Justice Warren E. Burger Associate Justices William J. Brennan Jr. · Potter Stewart; Byron White · Thurgood Marshall; Harry Blackmun · Lewis F. Powell Jr. William Rehnquist · John P. Stevens

Case opinions
- Majority: Blackmun, joined by Burger, Stewart, White, Powell, Rehnquist, Stevens
- Concurrence: Stevens
- Dissent: Marshall, joined by Brennan

Laws applied
- U.S. Const. amend. XIV, U.S. Const. amend. VI

Manson v. Brathwaite, 432 U.S. 98 (1977) was a case decided by the Supreme Court of the United States in 1977. The decision touched on the exclusionary rule in state criminal proceedings.

The Supreme Court held that the identification procedures used against Brathwaite did not violate the Constitution of the United States.

== Background ==
On May 5, 1970, Jimmy Glover of the Connecticut State Police went to an apartment building in Hartford with an informant, Henry Brown. The two had planned to buy drugs from "Dickie Boy" Cicero. They completed the purchase and, in doing so, Glover saw the seller's face through the apartment doorway. The pair left, and Glover went back to his station, where he described the seller to two other officers, D'Onofrio and Gaffey. On hearing the description, D'Onofrio believed that the description matched Brathwaite. D'Onofrio sourced Brathwaite's picture from the police records and left it at Glover's office. Glover then viewed the picture alone and positively identified Brathwaite as the person that had sold him the drugs. Brathwaite was arrested on July 27, 1970.

At his trial, the picture that Glover had used to make the positive identification was admitted into evidence without objection. The prosecution did not explain why the police did not use a photographic lineup to make the identification. Brathwaite testified in his own defense that he had been sick and stuck in his own apartment on May 5. His wife and doctor corroborated this testimony. Indeed, Brathwaite had surgery for a herniated disc.

The jury found Brathwaite guilty, and he was sentenced to 6–9 years in prison. His conviction was affirmed by the Connecticut Supreme Court in 1973. Brathwaite sought and did not receive federal habeas corpus relief in the United States District Court for the District of Connecticut. He appealed the decision to the United States Court of Appeals for the Second Circuit which reversed, holding that the photograph should have been excluded. The Supreme Court granted certiorari in 1976 (425 U.S. 957).

== Decision ==
In a 7–2 decision, the Supreme Court reversed the decision of the Second Circuit. Justice Harry Blackmun wrote the majority and reasoned that the law should strive to balance evidentiary reliability, deterrence of overreaching by the police, and the efficiency of the justice system. In balancing these three, he placed emphasis on the importance of reliable evidence in criminal proceedings. As such, the majority ruled that the appropriate factors to consider were those set out in Neil v. Biggers:

"These include the opportunity of the witness to view the criminal at the time of the crime, the witness' degree of attention, the accuracy of his prior description of the criminal, the level of certainty demonstrated at the confrontation, and the time between the crime and the confrontation. Against these factors is to be weighed the corrupting effect of the suggestive identification itself." – Justice Blackmun, Manson v. Brathwaite 432 U.S. 98, 114 (1977).

Applying the factors, the Court determined that the probative value of the evidence likely outweighed any prejudicial effect from its admission. The majority found that there was no "substantial likelihood of irreparable misidentification."

== Aftermath ==
The Brathwaite test has been criticized as being out of step with scientific research into eyewitness reliability.
