= Neil v. Biggers =

- Supreme Court of the United States

Argued October 18 and 19, 1972 Decided December 6, 1972
- Full case name: William S. Neil, Warden v. Archie Nathaniel Biggers
- Citations: 409 U.S. 188 (more) 93 S.Ct. 375
- Argument: Oral argument

Case history
- Prior: 448 F.2d 91 (6th Cir. 1971)

Questions presented
- Does an affirmance by an equally divided Court qualify as an "actual adjudication" barring subsequent consideration on habeas corpus? And, if not, did the identification procedure violate due process?

Holding
- The Court's equally divided affirmance of Biggers' state court conviction does not, under 28 U.S.C. § 2244(c), bar further federal relief by habeas corpus, since such an affirmance merely ends the process of direct review, but settles no issue of law. While the station-house identification may have been suggestive, under the totality of the circumstances, the victim's identification of respondent was reliable and was properly allowed to go to the jury.

Court membership
- Chief Justice Warren E. Burger Associate Justices William O. Douglas · William J. Brennan Jr. Potter Stewart · Byron White; Thurgood Marshall · Harry Blackmun; Lewis F. Powell Jr. · William Rehnquist

Case opinions
- Majority: Powell, joined by Burger, White, Blackmun, Rehnquist
- Concur/dissent: Brennan, joined by Douglas, Stewart
- Marshall took no part in the consideration or decision of the case.

Laws applied
- U.S. Const. amend. XIV

Neil v. Biggers, 409 U.S. 188 (1972), was a case decided by the Supreme Court of the United States in 1972. The case concerned the reliability of a police lineup.

== Background ==
In January 1965, Margaret Beamer was the victim of a home invasion. She was forced from her home and raped two blocks away. The entire attack took place during the evening, so she could only give a general description of the perpetrator. During the subsequent investigation, Beamer was unable to identify any suspect during various police lineups. On August 17, 1965, the police arrested Archie Biggers in connection with another rape. They asked Beamer to view Biggers in a "show-up," where Beamer was the only suspect shown. Beamer positively identified Biggers.

The state's case rested "almost exclusively" on the show-up identification. Biggers was found guilty and was sentenced to 20 years in prison. The Tennessee Supreme Court affirmed the sentence, which was affirmed 4–4 by the Supreme Court of the United States in 1968.

Biggers then sought federal habeas corpus relief, which was granted on the grounds that the Supreme Court's prior tied decision was not an "actual adjudication" under 28 U.S.C. § 2244(c) and that the show-up procedure was so suggestive as to violate Due Process. The United States Court of Appeals for the Sixth Circuit affirmed.

== Decision ==
In a 6–3 decision authored by Justice Lewis F. Powell Jr., the Court concluded that its prior tie on Biggers' case did not preclude relief and that the identification procedure at issue did not violate the Due Process Clause. Justice Thurgood Marshall did not participate in the consideration or decision of the case.

Justice Powell began by examining the history of tied Supreme Court cases and determined that such decisions are not precedential. Instead, such a decision merely leaves in place the decision of the lower court.

The Court then examined its precedents relating to the admissibility of evidence, particularly focusing on Stovall v. Denno. The Court held that:

"[T]he factors to be considered in evaluating the likelihood of misidentification include the opportunity of the witness to view the criminal at the time of the crime, the witness' degree of attention, the accuracy of the witness' prior description of the criminal, the level of certainty demonstrated by the witness at the confrontation, and the length of time between the crime and the confrontation." - Justice Powell, Neil v. Biggers 490 U.S. 188, 199 (1972).

Balancing these factors, the Court concluded that there was no "substantial risk of misidentification."

Justice William J. Brennan Jr. wrote a partial concurrence and dissent. While he agreed that the previous, tied decision was not an "actual adjudication," he believed that the identification procedure was too suggestive to survive constitutional scrutiny.

== Aftermath ==
The Biggers decision has been criticized as being out of step with modern understandings of eyewitness memory.

== See also ==
- Manson v. Brathwaite
