= Notice =

Legal concept to make a party aware of a legal process affecting them

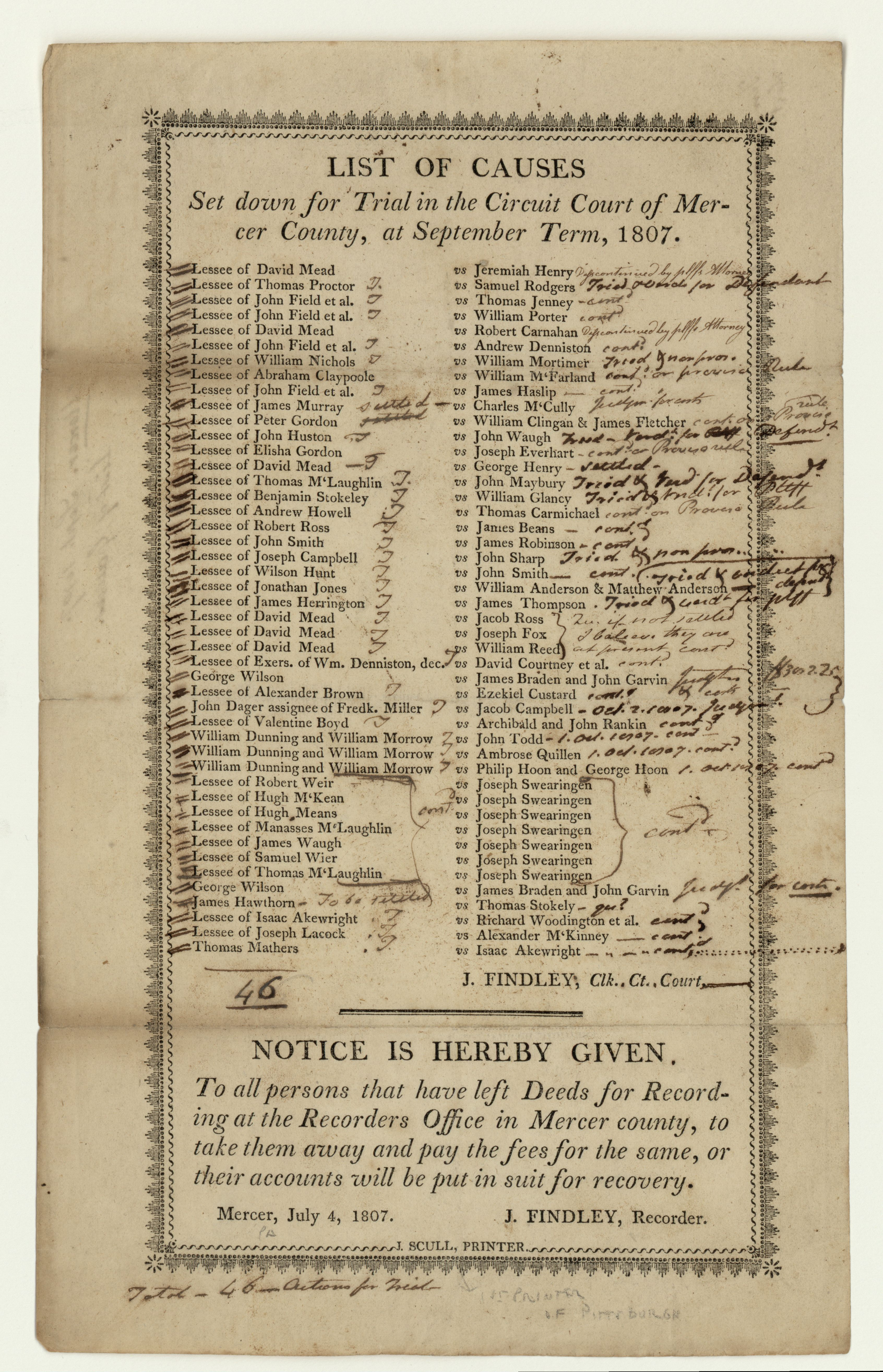
July 4, 1807 notice to persons for September circuit court session, Mercer Countywide

Notice is the legal concept describing a requirement that a party be aware of legal process affecting their rights, obligations or duties. There are several types of notice: public notice (or legal notice), actual notice, constructive notice.

== Service of process ==
At common law, notice is the fundamental principle in service of process. In this case, the service of process puts the defendant "on notice" of the allegations contained within the complaint, or other such pleading. Since notice is fundamental, a court may rule a pleading defective if it does not put the defendant on notice.

In a civil case, personal jurisdiction over a defendant is obtained by service of a summons. Service can be accomplished by personal delivery of the summons or subpoena to the person or an authorized agent of the person. Service may also be made by substitute means; for example, in many jurisdictions, service of a summons can be made on a person of suitable age and discretion at the residence or place of business of the defendant. Jurisdiction over corporations can often be obtained through a government body authorized to receive such process.

== Due process issues (United States) ==
In the United States, the right to receive notice before the government deprives an individual of a protected interest is guaranteed, along with the opportunity to be heard, by the Due Process Clauses in the Fifth and Fourteenth amendments. The Sixth Amendment also specifically guarantees the right of a criminal defendant to be notified of the charges and their grounds.

If a court bases personal jurisdiction over an out-of-state or foreign defendant on a long-arm statute, the court must carefully select a means of notifying the defendant, to comply with the notice requirement of due process. Sometimes this is done by serving agents of the defendant located within the state. Because out-of-state defendants cannot always be located easily, some state or local laws may allow for service by publication. An example of this would be printing a notice of the lawsuit in a newspaper published where the defendant is believed to reside. Because the failure of a defendant to appear in court results in a default judgment against him, such measures must be sufficiently calculated to give actual notice to the defendant to satisfy due process.

In Mullane v. Central Hanover Bank & Trust Co., the core case setting forth constitutional notice requirements, the U.S. Supreme Court held that notice must be "reasonably calculated, under all the circumstances, to apprise interested parties of the pendency of the action and afford them an opportunity to present their objections". Moreover, defendants must be notified by the "best practical means" available.

== Notice and knowledge ==
Many statutes include that the accused knowingly have acted in violation. When a party is "put on notice" that they are in violation, continued action in violation may be sufficient to evidence knowledge.

== Types of notices ==
- Actual notice
- Constructive notice
- Funding Opportunity Announcement
- Judicial notice
- Notice of proposed rulemaking (administrative law)
- Previous notice (parliamentary procedure)
- Public notice
- Resign
