= United States v. Arvizu =

- Supreme Court of the United States

Argued November 27, 2001 Decided January 15, 2002
- Full case name: United States of America v. Ralph Arvizu
- Citations: 534 U.S. 266 (more) 122 S. Ct. 744; 151 L. Ed. 2d 740

Case history
- Prior: Defendant convicted in the United States District Court for the District of Arizona. Conviction reversed by the Ninth Circuit Court of Appeals, 232 F.3d 1241 (9th Cir. 2000). The Court granted certiorari, 532 U.S. 1065 (2001).

Holding
- Under the totality of the circumstances, reasonable suspicion supported a border patrol agent's decision to stop a motorist traveling on an isolated road in a forested area of southern Arizona near the Mexican border, even if each of the reasons the officer gave for the stop, viewed in isolation, had an innocent explanation.

Court membership
- Chief Justice William Rehnquist Associate Justices John P. Stevens · Sandra Day O'Connor; Antonin Scalia · Anthony Kennedy; David Souter · Clarence Thomas; Ruth Bader Ginsburg · Stephen Breyer

Case opinions
- Majority: Rehnquist, joined by unanimous
- Concurrence: Scalia

Laws applied
- U.S. Const. amend. IV

United States v. Arvizu, 534 U.S. 266 (2002), is a case in which the Supreme Court of the United States unanimously reaffirmed the proposition that the Fourth Amendment required courts to analyze the reasonableness of a traffic stop based on the totality of the circumstances instead of examining the plausibility of each reason an officer gives for stopping a motorist individually.

== Background ==
U.S. Border Patrol agent Clinton Stoddard was working a checkpoint on U.S. Highway 191 north of Douglas, Arizona on an afternoon in January 1998. In this area, the roads are equipped with sensors to alert agents to the presence of traffic on infrequently traveled roads, a sign that smugglers of drugs or aliens might be in the area. At 2:15 p.m., a car passing on a nearby road tripped a sensor, and Stoddard went to investigate. Agents typically changed shifts around this time.

Stoddard found the vehicle that tripped the sensor. It was a minivan, the sort of car that smugglers use to transport their cargo. As it approached Stoddard, it slowed dramatically, from about 55 miles per hour to about 30. An adult man was driving. His posture was rigid, and he conspicuously ignored Stoddard as Stoddard passed by. Stoddard found this behavior suspicious because most drivers in the area wave at passing motorists. Stoddard also noticed children sitting in the back seat of the minivan. Their knees were propped up high, as if their feet were resting on something on the floor. At this point, Stoddard pulled alongside the car. The children in the back seat started to wave at Stoddard in a peculiar manner. As Stoddard was driving alongside the car, the driver abruptly signaled a turn onto the last available road that would avoid the checkpoint. Stoddard radioed for a registration check on the minivan, and found out that it was registered to an address in Douglas known for heavy narcotics trafficking. At this point Stoddard stopped the minivan. Stoddard learned that the driver's name was Ralph Arvizu. Stoddard asked Arvizu for permission to search the van, and found almost 129 pounds of marijuana.

Arvizu was charged in district court with possession of marijuana with intent to distribute. In federal court, he asked to suppress the marijuana, arguing that Stoddard did not have reasonable suspicion to stop him. Citing these facts and the circuitous nature of the route Arvizu was taking from Douglas to nearby Tucson, the district court denied Arvizu's suppression motion.

The Ninth Circuit Court of Appeals overturned the district court's decision. After analyzing each of the 10 factors relied on by the district court in isolation, the Ninth Circuit concluded that seven of the 10 factors were susceptible of an innocent explanation and thus carried little or no weight in the reasonable-suspicion analysis. The remaining factors—the fact that the route was frequently traveled by smugglers, the timing of the alert relative to the agents' shift change, and the fact that Arvizu was driving a minivan—did not render the stop permissible.

The appeals court found that the lower court's approach introduced too much uncertainty for police officers trying to apply the Fourth Amendment. Consequently, the court reversed Arvizu's conviction. The government appealed to the Supreme Court which agreed to hear the case due to its significant impact on enforcement of federal drug and immigration laws.

== Supreme Court ruling ==
The Court reiterated that when reviewing courts make reasonable suspicion determinations, they must look at the "totality of the circumstances" to see if the officer had a "particularized and objective basis" for suspecting a person of committing a crime. The legal standard for an investigative stop is a middle ground. An officer cannot act on a mere "hunch," but the suspicion required is less than probable cause. The suspicion must be reasonable and based on specific, articulable facts. The Court emphasized that an officer's assessment must be based on the whole picture, including their specialized training and local knowledge.

The Court reasoned that Stoddard's observations, combined with his experience, supported a commonsense inference of criminal activity: the vehicle was on a remote route known for smuggling, at a time coinciding with a shift change when patrols would be minimal. The family's turn away from known recreational areas made a picnic outing unlikely, and taking such a long, rough road didn't fit that innocent purpose. The children's knees were raised in a way that suggested hidden cargo, and the driver's nervous reaction—along with the children's prolonged, unnatural waving—added to the overall suspicious picture. Together, these facts rose above a mere hunch and justified the investigative stop.

According to the Court, the approach taken by the Ninth Circuit, in which it found that seven of Stoddard's ten reasons were susceptible of an innocent explanation, did not examine the totality of the circumstances and thus ran counter to the de novo review that the Court had previously ruled should apply to appellate review of reasonable suspicion determinations. The appeals court had dismissed individual factors—like a driver slowing down or avoiding eye contact with an officer—as universally insignificant. The Supreme Court countered that such behaviors are context-dependent; what is normal on a busy city freeway may be highly suspicious on a remote rural road known for smuggling.

The appeals court had also ignored factual findings of the District Court Judge that the children waving was "a fact that is off and would lead a reasonable officer to wonder why they are doing this." Based on the totality of the circumstances, the Supreme Court held that Officer Stoddard did have reasonable suspicion to justify the stop.

== Concurrence ==
Justice Antonin Scalia agreed that the Court was correct to reemphasize that the de novo standard of review applies to appellate review of rulings regarding reasonable suspicion. Even so, he criticized the Court's deference to a district judge's "factual inferences," finding it to be incompatible with de novo review.

== See also ==
- List of United States Supreme Court cases, volume 534
- List of United States Supreme Court cases
