= Public notice =

Notice given to the public regarding certain types of legal proceedings

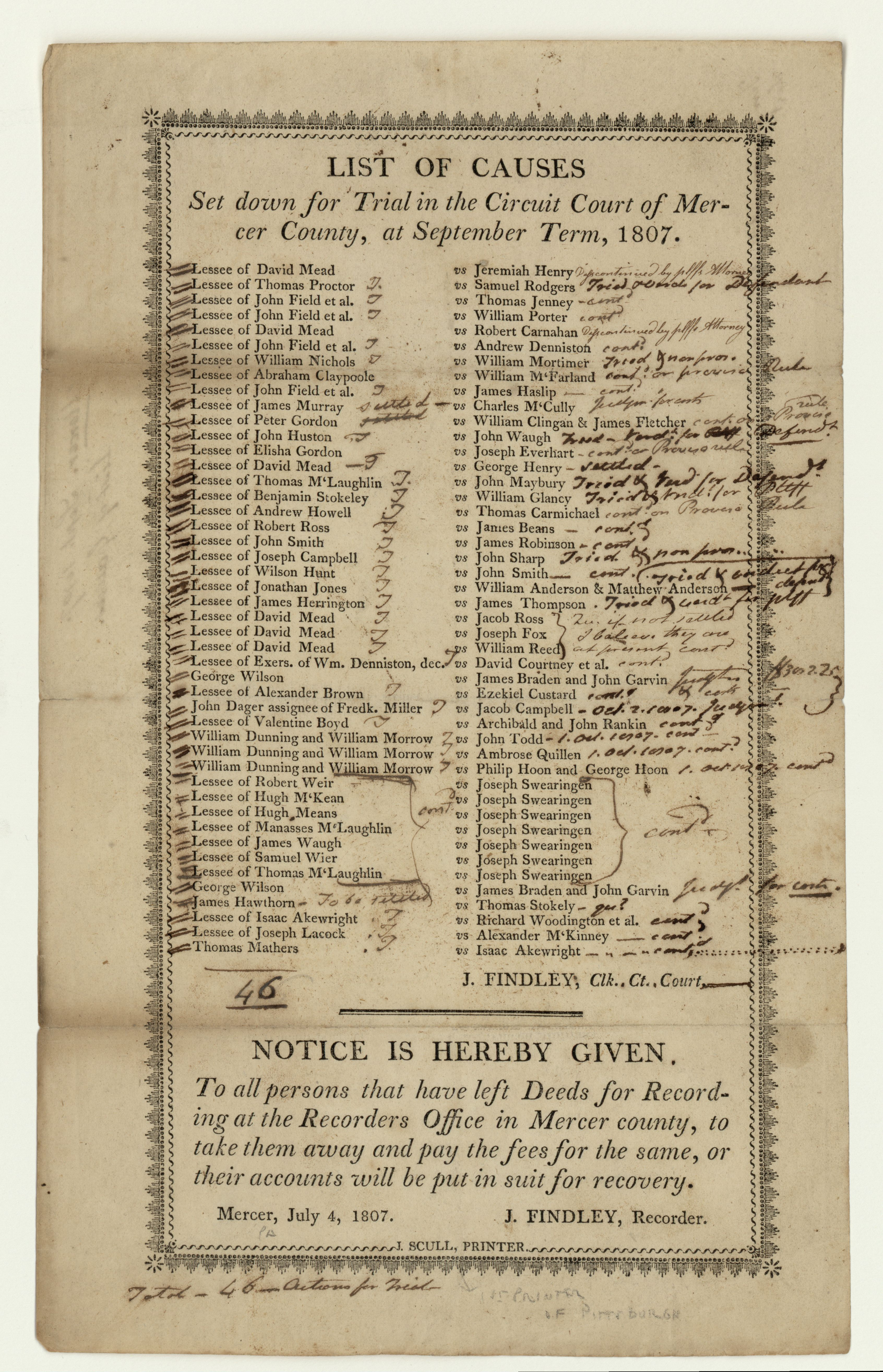
Public notice to "all persons that have left deeds for recording at the Recorders Office in Mercer County", Pennsylvania, July 4, 1807

A public notice is a form of notice given to the public regarding certain types of legal proceedings.

== By government ==
Public notices are issued by a government agency or legislative body in certain rulemaking or lawmaking proceeding.

It is a requirement in most jurisdictions, in order to allow members of the public to make their opinions on proposals known before a rule or law is made.

For local government, public notice is often given by those seeking a liquor license, a rezoning or variance, or other minor approval which must be granted by a city council, county commission, or board of supervisors.

== By private individuals or companies ==
Parties to some legal proceedings, such as foreclosures, probate, and estate actions are sometimes required to publish public notices.

== In communications ==
Public notices are sometimes required to seek a new broadcast license from a national broadcasting authority, or a change to modification to an existing license.

U.S. broadcast stations are required to give public notice on the air that they are seeking a license renewal from the U.S. Federal Communications Commission (FCC) or to notify viewers of the station's purchase by another party. Records of the public notices must often be kept in a station's public file.

== Method of notice ==
One method of notice is publication of a public notice ad in a local newspaper of record. Public notice can also be given in other ways, including radio, television, and on the Internet. Some governments required publication in a local/nationwide newspaper or the government gazette, though there have been attempts among some politicians to eliminate the expense of publication by switching to electronic forms of notification.

== See also ==
- Constructive notice
- Substituted service
- UCC-1 financing statement
