= Gary L. Wells =

American social psychologist

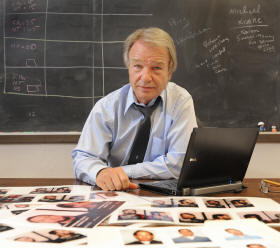
- Gary L. Wells in 2011

Gary Leroy Wells is an American social psychologist known for his research on eyewitness memory and identification. He served as a professor at Iowa State University as chair of the Department of Psychology and was the first Stavish Chair in the Social Science. Wells' research has influenced courtroom procedures and practices, including lineups and eyewitness identification. He has published over 175 articles, received many awards for his contributions, and has appeared in media outlets.

== Education ==
Wells earned his Bachelors of Science with honors in psychology from Kansas State University in 1973 and completed his Doctor of Philosophy (Ph.D.) in Experimental Social psychology at Ohio State University in 1977.

== Career ==
Wells began his academic career at the University of Alberta, and rose to the rank of full professor. In 1989, he joined Iowa State University as Chair of the Department of Psychology. He was later named Professor of Psychology and was appointed the first Stavish Chair in the Social Sciences.

Wells retired in 2023 and was named Distinguished Professor Emeritus. He was a Fellow of the American Psychological Association, the Association for Psychological Science, and the Society of Experimental Social Psychology. Wells is a past president of the American Psychology-Law Society. He served as a consultant and a speaker to judges, law enforcement, defense counsel, and prosecution counsel regarding issues on eyewitness memory, crime investigation procedures, and evidence evaluation. Wells published work in areas such as attitudes and persuasion, attribution, judgment, and decision-making. His contributions on eyewitness evidence have had a significant impact on psychological science and the legal system.

== Research ==
=== Lineup presentations ===
Through staged crime experiments involving unsuspecting participants, Wells' research has significantly shaped a scientific understanding of issues surrounding the reliability of eyewitness identification evidence, and highlighting the role that inadequate lineup procedures play in leading to mistaken eyewitness identification, and fostering false confidence amongst eyewitnesses.

Wells introduced the idea of double-blind lineups, in which the administrator conducting the lineup does not know who the suspect is. The idea of the double-blind lineup is to prevent inadvertent influence on the eyewitness from the lineup administrator. Double-blind lineup procedures are now required in many states and individual jurisdictions across the United States. In 2014, a report from a study committee the National Academy of Sciences endorsed the idea that all lineups should be conducted using double-blind procedures.

Wells also developed a method of lineup fairness known as the functional lineup size, differentiates between the total number of people in a lineup and the number of fillers (i.e., innocent stand ins who fit the description).

In the 1990s, Wells and his Ph.D. student Amy Bradfield Douglass discovered that the confidence that eyewitnesses express in their identifications is highly malleable and can be dramatically inflated after making a mistaken identification through simple comments that seem to confirm their choice, a phenomenon known as the post-identification feedback.

In 2011, Wells and Penrod, reviewed the effectiveness of current metrologies for studying eyewitness identification. overall, they recommend a mixed-methods approach, but caution researchers to ground their conclusions within the scope of their methodology. In a field experiment across four police departments, Wells and Colleagues found that roughly one-third of all eyewitness identifications incorrectly identified an innocent filler from the lineup.

=== System and estimator variables ===
In an influential article, Wells (1978) introduced the distinction between system and estimator variables. System variables, such as identification procedures, can be controlled and, therefore, improved upon. Comparatively, estimator variables, such as the length of time the witness saw the suspect, cannot be controlled and, therefore, their impact on the case must be estimated.

Wells proposed that research on system variables was considered more applicable to real-world settings because it could direct the development of procedures to reduce mistaken identifications. He further argued that the rate of misidentifications is often affected by methodological biases in how identifications are conducted by law enforcement. The differentiation between system and estimator variables introduced by Wells has since become essential in the field of eyewitness identification and the terminology has since become widely adopted in eyewitness research.

=== Bayesian statistics ===
Wells introduced the application of bayesian statistics to determine the accuracy rates of eyewitness identification. Wells has further developed these Bayesian methods to show how the amount of information (about guilt) gained from eyewitness identification evidence can be quite small and is highly dependent on other (non-witness) evidence.

=== Publications ===
Wells has authored over 200 chapters in books on his research dealing with eyewitness memory and eyewitness testimony. Some of the most notable journals that Wells has been published in include Psychological Bulletin, American Psychologist, Journal of Personality and Social Psychology, Journal of Experimental Psychology: Applied, Psychological Science, Law and Human Behavior, and Journal of Applied Psychology.

Wells also co-authored Eyewitness Testimony: Psychological Perspectives, with Elizabeth Loftus which published on May 25, 1984. The book examines topics such as eyewitness memory as a function of age, the adequacy of intuition in judging eyewitness memory, and the relationship between confidence and accuracy.

== Real world implications ==
Wells has conducted more than 35 years of research on eyewitness misidentification and collaborated with law enforcement and prosecutors, contributing to developments in legal and courtroom procedures. His involvement with the Innocence Project and public appearances with Jennifer Thompson have helped raise awareness about the effects of misidentification in wrongful convictions. According to data from the Innocence Project, approximately 75% of DNA exonerations in the United States involve mistaken eyewitness identification.

=== Proper procedures for constructing and eyewitness identification procedures ===
Wells collaborated with several U.S. states to reform eyewitness identification procedures, beginning with New Jersey in 2002 and North Carolina in 2003. Other states later followed in making reforms to eyewitness identification procedures based on the early models that Wells developed. Most states now require double-blind administration of lineups, pre-lineup instructions to witnesses warning that the culprit might not be in the lineup, the use of lineup fillers so that the suspect does not stand out, and the collection of a confidence statement from the eyewitness at the time of any identification. These same reforms have now been adopted by the International Association of Chiefs of Police.

=== Court procedures for evaluating eyewitness evidence ===
Wells questioned the U.S. Supreme Court’s rulings on evaluations of eyewitness reliability with regards to the role of suggestibility in Neil v. Biggers (1973) and Manson v. Braithwaite (1977). In later publications, Wells and Quinlivan (2009) argued that these standards were inconsistent with empirical findings in eyewitness science and called for reforms to align legal evaluations with psychological research.

State Supreme Court ruling have used Wells’ critique of Mason v. Braithwaite to fashion new approaches to accessing the reliability of eyewitness identification evidence (e.g., State v. Henderson in New Jersey and State v. Lawson in Oregon). In agreement with Wells, the National Academy of Science endorses the idea of casting out the Manson v. Braithwaite approach to evaluating the reliability of eyewitness identifications.

Wells' testimony in court cases and eyewitness research on system and estimator variables has influenced legislation and state Supreme Court decisions. States such as New Jersey, North Carolina, Ohio, Vermont, Illinois, and Connecticut, for example, now require double-blind lineups and other safeguards for eyewitness identification evidence that Wells advocated. Wells' work with the U.S. Department of Justice under Attorney General Janet Reno resulted in the first set of national recommendations for law enforcement regarding the collection and preservation of eyewitness evidence

In 2003, the United States Court of Appeals 7th Circuit upheld Wells' testimony in a Chicago civil suit pertaining to lineup procedures in which the defendant was pardoned innocence after the allegation that the police officer induced the three witnesses to identify him as the perpetrator. For his testimony, Wells conducted an experiment to examine the likelihood that all three of the witnesses would pick the defendant out of a lineup. The results suggested that the police officers manipulated the lineup due to the probability of picking the defendant being less than one in 1000. Reforms for legal standards in eyewitness identifications have been also noted in other cases such as State v. Larry R. Henderson and questions of constitutionality for eyewitness identifications have been raised (Perry v. New Hampshire).

== In popular media ==
Wells' research on eyewitness testimony has been referenced in popular press, such as The New York Times, which have discussed the reliability of eyewitness testimony and approaches for reducing false identification. His work has also been featured in The Los Angeles Times, highlighting issues with eyewitness testimonies.

Wells has been featured on television programs to discuss eyewitness memory and its suggestions for the legal setting. Appearances include CBS’s 48 Hours and Today’s Show, where he introduced key findings and appropriate approaches to decrease wrongful convictions from false eyewitness testimonies.

== Honors, awards, and memberships ==
Year	Honor/Award	Institution	Reference
2010	Stavish Chair in Social Sciences	Iowa State University	Iowa State University Major Gifts
2011	Distinguished Almuni Award	Kansas State University	Kansas State Today
2017	James Mckeen Cattell Award	Association for Psychological Science	APS Awards
2020	Distinguished Contribution Award	Iowa Stats University	Iowa State University Department News
