= TRW Inc. v. Andrews =

- Supreme Court of the United States

Argued October 9, 2001 Decided November 13, 2001
- Full case name: TRW Inc. v. Adelaide Andrews
- Citations: 534 U.S. 19 (more) 122 S. Ct. 441; 151 L. Ed. 2d 339; 70 U.S.L.W. 4006; 2001 Cal. Daily Op. Service 9638; 2001 Daily Journal DAR 12011; 15 Fla. L. Weekly Fed. S 1

Case history
- Prior: Andrews v. Trans Union Corp., 7 F. Supp. 2d 1056 (C.D. Cal. 1998); affirmed in part, reversed in part, Andrews v. TRW Inc., 225 F.3d 1063 (9th Cir. 2000); cert. granted, 532 U.S. 902 (2001).
- Subsequent: Remanded, 289 F.3d 600 (9th Cir. 2001).

Court membership
- Chief Justice William Rehnquist Associate Justices John P. Stevens · Sandra Day O'Connor; Antonin Scalia · Anthony Kennedy; David Souter · Clarence Thomas; Ruth Bader Ginsburg · Stephen Breyer

Case opinions
- Majority: Ginsburg, joined by Rehnquist, Stevens, O'Connor, Kennedy, Souter, and Breyer
- Concurrence: Scalia (in judgment), joined by Thomas

Laws applied
- Fair Credit Reporting Act, 15 U.S.C. § 1681p

TRW Inc. v. Andrews, 534 U.S. 19 (2001), is a United States Supreme Court decision holding that the discovery rule (that a federal statute of limitations begins to run when a party knows or has reason to know that she was injured) does not apply to the two-year statute of limitations of the Fair Credit Reporting Act.

== Background ==
The plaintiff in TRW v. Andrews was a victim of identity theft. An imposter, who had the same last name and first initial as the plaintiff, obtained Andrews’ social security number and attempted to open numerous credit accounts under the imposter's name. On four occasions, the creditors responding to the impostor's applications sought reports from the credit reporting division of TRW, which later became Experian. TRW matched the social security number, last name, and first initial with Andrews’ file and disclosed her credit history to the creditors.

Andrews did not learn of the disclosures until she attempted to refinance her home and requested a copy of her credit report, which reflected the impostor's activity. TRW corrected Andrews’ file when notified of the mistakes. However, Andrews alleged that the blemishes on her credit report “forced her to abandon her refinancing efforts and settle for an alternative line of credit on less favorable terms.”

=== Procedural history ===
Andrews filed suit against TRW on October 21, 1996, approximately 17 months after she became aware of the inaccurate information on her credit report and more than two years after TRW made the two initial disclosures. Andrews alleged that TRW's failure to verify, prior to disclosing information to creditors, that she initiated the requests or was otherwise involved in the underlying transactions was in violation of the Fair Credit Reporting Act’s requirement that credit reporting agencies maintain reasonable procedures to avoid improper disclosures. Not relevant to the Supreme Court’s opinion was an additional claim by Andrews that TRW failed to “follow reasonable procedures to assure maximum possible accuracy of the information” in the reports, in violation of 15 U.S.C. 1681e(b). This claim was resolved by a jury in favor of TRW. By failing to verify that Andrews was the initiator of the requests, Andrews alleged that TRW facilitated the identity theft. She sought injunctive relief, punitive damages and other compensation.

TRW argued that Andrews’ claims based on the two earliest disclosures were barred because the Fair Credit Reporting Act's two year statute of limitations had expired. Andrews countered that all of her claims were timely because the statute of limitations did not toll until the date she learned of the inaccurate disclosures. This argument was based upon Andrews’ contention that the FCRA incorporated a general federal rule which tolls the statute of limitations at the time the plaintiff becomes aware of the injury.

The District Court agreed with TRW, and held that a general federal discovery rule was not incorporated into the Fair Credit Reporting Act, thus barring Andrews’ claims based on the two earliest disclosures. The District Court also granted TRW's motion for summary judgment on the two remaining claims, finding that TRW had maintained adequate procedures to avoid improper disclosures.

The Ninth Circuit Court of Appeals reversed the District Court, applying the “general federal rule . . . that a federal statute of limitations begins to run when a party knows or has reason to know that she was injured.” The Ninth Circuit rejected the District Court's assertion that the text of 15 U.S.C. 1681p, including the exception to the commencement of the statute of limitations, precluded the application of general federal discovery rules, holding that “unless Congress has expressly legislated otherwise the equitable doctrine of discovery is read into every federal statute of limitations.” The court concluded that since the Fair Credit Reporting Act contained no express legislative directive the general rule applied, thus the statute of limitations had not expired on any of Andrews’ claims. TRW appealed to the Supreme Court

== Opinion of the court ==
The Supreme Court reversed the Ninth Circuit's decision, stating that the Ninth Circuit “conspicuously overstated” the scope and force of the presumption that general discovery rules apply unless Congress has expressly legislated otherwise. The Court said that while some lower federal courts have applied a general discovery rule when a statute is silent on the issue, the Supreme Court has not adopted that position. Furthermore, the Court stated that it had “never endorsed the Ninth Circuit’s view that Congress can convey its refusal to adopt a discovery rule only by explicit command, rather than by implication from the structure or text of the particular statute.”

While the Ninth Circuit correctly noted that the Fair Credit Reporting Act contains no specific directive against the application of general federal discovery rules, the Court noted that the statute does set forth a specific statute of limitations, along with a single exception to the general rule. Based upon the text and structure of the statute in question, the Supreme Court determined that Congress’ “intent to preclude judicial implication of a discovery rule” was clear. Citing an earlier case, the Court held that “[w]here Congress explicitly enumerates certain exceptions to a general prohibition, additional exceptions are not to be implied, in the absence of evidence of a contrary legislative intent.” Applying general principles of statutory construction, the Court reasoned that “Congress implicitly excluded a general discovery rule by explicitly including a more limited one.” To allow the incorporation of a general rule in light of this fact, would have the practical effect of rendering the stated exception to the general rule “entirely superfluous in all but the most unusual circumstances,” thus violating a “cardinal principal of statutory construction” - that “a statute ought, upon the whole, to be so construed that, if it can be prevented, no clause, sentence, or word shall be superfluous, void or insignificant.”

As if anticipating the Court's decision, Andrews argued that if the statute of limitations was to commence on the date on which liability arises, the date should be the date on which the inaccuracies come to the attention of the potential plaintiff, rather than the date on which the credit reporting agency made the inaccurate disclosure. Andrews relied on legislative history pointing to Congress’ consideration of alternative language in making her argument. The Court rejected Andrews’ reliance on legislative history noting that TRW was able to present information to the contrary.

The Court also rejected Andrews’ argument that liability did not arise until actual damages materialized. Refusing to address the issue because it was not raised earlier, the Court doubted that the argument would have aided Andrews because Andrews’ alleged damages began to materialize when the inaccurate disclosures were made, causing the statute of limitations to toll at the same time as under the statutory language in question.

By reversing the Ninth Circuit's decision, the Supreme Court barred Andrews’ claims based upon the two earliest disclosures. The case was remanded for further proceedings consistent with the opinion, presumably allowing Andrews to go forward with the other claims.

== See also ==
- List of United States Supreme Court cases, volume 534
- List of United States Supreme Court cases
