= Mullane v. Central Hanover Bank & Trust Co. =

- Supreme Court of the United States

Argued February 8, 1950 Decided April 24, 1950
- Full case name: Mullane, Special Guardian, v. Central Hanover Bank & Trust Co., Trustee, et al.
- Citations: 339 U.S. 306 (more) 70 S. Ct. 652; 94 L. Ed. 865; 1950 U.S. LEXIS 2070

Case history
- Prior: on writ of certiorari from the New York Court of Appeals; 299 N.Y. 697, 87 N.E.2d 73 (1949), reversed.

Holding
- Notice of judicial proceedings must be reasonably calculated to reach those who are known to be affected by such proceedings.

Court membership
- Chief Justice Fred M. Vinson Associate Justices Hugo Black · Stanley F. Reed; Felix Frankfurter · William O. Douglas; Robert H. Jackson · Harold H. Burton; Tom C. Clark · Sherman Minton

Case opinions
- Majority: Jackson, joined by Vinson, Black, Reed, Frankfurter, Minton, Clark
- Dissent: Burton
- Douglas took no part in the consideration or decision of the case.

Laws applied
- U.S. Const. amend. XIV, New York State Banking Law §100-c

Mullane v. Central Hanover Bank & Trust Co., 339 U.S. 306 (1950), was a case in which the Supreme Court of the United States set forth the constitutional requirements for notice of judicial proceedings to a potential party under the Fourteenth Amendment to the United States Constitution.

== Background ==
Section 100-c of the New York State Banking Law provided for the pooling of small trusts into a large common fund administered by a corporate fiduciary, with the income, expenses, and capital gains and losses shared by the constituent trusts in proportion to their contribution to the common fund. The purpose of this legislation (and similar laws in other states) was to provide corporate fiduciary services to modestly sized trusts which would be too costly to manage individually, promoting economies of scale in the American trust management industry and better risk management for smaller trusts. Central Hanover Bank & Trust Co. in New York City was the manager & trustee of one such common trust fund.

== Facts and procedural history ==
The common trust fund at issue in this case was established on January 17, 1946, and §100-c provided for an accounting of each fund to be undertaken twelve to fifteen months after the establishment of a fund, and then for every three years thereafter.

In March 1947, Central Hanover petitioned the New York Surrogate's Court for a settlement of its first account as common trustee. By this time there were approximately 113 trusts participating in the fund, about half inter vivos trusts and half testamentary trusts, with combined gross capital assets of nearly three million dollars.

The only notice of the settlement proceedings required by §100-c to be given to the trusts' beneficiaries was that after filing such petition for judicial settlement of its account the petitioner shall cause to be issued by the court in which the petition is filed and shall publish not less than once in each week for four successive weeks in a newspaper to be designated by the court a notice or citation addressed generally without naming them to all parties interested in such common trust fund and in such estates, trusts or funds mentioned in the petition, all of which may be described in the notice or citation only in the manner set forth in any related court order and without setting forth the residence of any such decedent or donor of any such estate, trust or fund. When the fund had just been started, however, Central Hanover sent notice by mail of the future proceedings. Subsequent notice in its paper included only the name of the trust, the date of establishment and the estates in the trust. The names of beneficiaries were not included. Appellant Kenneth Mullane was appointed special guardian and attorney for those parties known or unknown who had any interest in the income of the fund, and James N. Vaughan was appointed to represent those parties with interest in the principal.

Mullane appeared specially to object to the statutory provision for notice, claiming that it was inadequate to afford the due process required by the Fourteenth Amendment. The Surrogate overruled Mullane's objections, and entered a decree accepting the accounting and terminating any rights the beneficiaries may have had against Central Hanover for mismanagement of the trust. The New York Supreme Court Appellate Division subsequently affirmed, as did the New York Court of Appeals. The U.S. Supreme Court then granted certiorari.

== Majority opinion ==
Justice Jackson began his examination of the issues of the case by discussing the nature of the jurisdiction which the Surrogate's Court was exercising. He explained some of the differences in the service of process required in in rem, quasi in rem, and in personam actions. Mullane had argued that this was essentially an in personam action, and that the Surrogate could not exercise jurisdiction on out-of-state residents upon whom personal service had not been made.

Jackson did not explicitly determine what type of jurisdiction was being exercised here, but held that the Fourteenth Amendment applied to all of them regardless of how the state classified the action. The beneficiaries' property rights were at stake here, and without proper notice, the "right to be heard" provided by the Fourteenth Amendment was of no practical consequence. Constructive service via newspaper publication, wrote Jackson, was an unreliable method of giving notice, because newspapers have limited circulation and even then, many people do not examine the legal notices, which are usually in agate type on the back pages. In this case, the legal notice at issue did not even mention the names of the beneficiaries. Furthermore, under normal circumstances, property holders are directly aware of legal proceedings regarding their property, either directly or through a caretaker. But in this case, the caretaker was the beneficiaries' adversary - the trustee itself - which could not be expected to give them reasonable notice, and the special guardian was also not required to give notice.

Jackson held that notice must be "reasonably calculated" to inform known parties affected by the proceedings. Thus, §100-c(12), the section of the statute which dealt with notice to beneficiaries, was unconstitutional. He further held that notice by publication was acceptable for missing or unknown parties, for those whose whereabouts could not be ascertained by due diligence, and for those whose future interests were too conjectural to be known with any certainty. However, Jackson noted that in many cases, notice to the known parties would help the information of the proceedings to reach those who were unknown by the trustee.

== Dissent ==
Justice Burton wrote a brief dissent, remarking that since the states created legislation creating the common trust funds, that the decision of what notice was required in such situations should be left to the states.

== See also ==
- List of United States Supreme Court cases, volume 339
