= United States v. Knights =

- Supreme Court of the United States

Argued November 6, 2001 Decided December 10, 2001
- Full case name: United States v. Knights
- Citations: 534 U.S. 112 (more)

Holding
- Search of a probationer that is supported by reasonable suspicion and pursuant to a probation condition satisfies the Fourth Amendment.

Court membership
- Chief Justice William Rehnquist Associate Justices John P. Stevens · Sandra Day O'Connor; Antonin Scalia · Anthony Kennedy; David Souter · Clarence Thomas; Ruth Bader Ginsburg · Stephen Breyer

Case opinions
- Majority: Rehnquist, joined by unanimous
- Concurrence: Souter

Laws applied
- U.S. Const. amend. IV

United States v. Knights, 534 U.S. 112 (2001), was a case decided by the Supreme Court of the United States on December 10, 2001. The court held that the police search of a probationer supported by reasonable suspicion and pursuant to a probation condition satisfied the requirements under the Fourth Amendment.

== Background ==
When Mark James Knights was sentenced to summary probation by a California court for a drug offense, the probation order included one condition: Knights would submit his "person, property, place of residence, vehicle, personal effects, to search at anytime, with or without a search warrant, warrant of arrest or reasonable cause by any probation officer or law enforcement officer.” Several days later, Knights and his friend were suspected of committing arson. Police then searched Knights' apartment without a warrant and discovered items potentially associated with the crime. Knights was later indicted by a federal grand jury "for conspiracy to commit arson, for possession of an unregistered destructive device, and being a felon in possession of ammunition." Knights subsequently filed a motion to suppress the evidence obtained from the search. The District Court granted his motion on the ground that the search was for "investigatory" instead of "probationary" purposes. The Court of Appeals later affirmed.

== Result ==
In a unanimous decision delivered by Justice Rehnquist, the Court reversed the decision of the Court of Appeals and upheld the constitutionality of the warrantless search of Knights' apartment. The Court held that the search was reasonable under the Fourth Amendment due to the search condition in Knights' probation order and the search being supported by reasonable suspicion.

== See also ==
- List of United States Supreme Court cases, volume 534
- Fourth Amendment to the United States Constitution
- List of United States Supreme Court cases by the Rehnquist Court
- Warrantless searches in the United States
- Griffin v. Wisconsin
