= List of United States Supreme Court cases, volume 409 =

This is a list of all United States Supreme Court cases from volume 409 of the United States Reports:

Case name	Citation	Date decided
O'Brien v. Brown	409 U.S. 1	1972
United States v. Louisiana (1972)	409 U.S. 17	1972
California v. Krivda	409 U.S. 33	1972
Illinois v. Michigan	409 U.S. 36	1972
Robinson v. Hanrahan	409 U.S. 38	1972
Murch v. Mottram	409 U.S. 41	1972
NLRB v. Int'l Van Lines	409 U.S. 48	1972
Rivas v. Cozens	409 U.S. 55	1972
Givens v. W.T. Grant Co.	409 U.S. 56	1972
Ward v. Monroeville	409 U.S. 57	1972
Gottschalk v. Benson	409 U.S. 63	1972
Johnson v. N.Y. State Educ. Dept.	409 U.S. 75	1972
United States v. Jim	409 U.S. 80	1972
Evco v. Jones	409 U.S. 91	1972
Webb v. Texas	409 U.S. 95	1972
Cool v. United States	409 U.S. 100	1972
California v. LaRue	409 U.S. 109	1972
The San Jacinto	409 U.S. 140	1972
Tidewater Oil Co. v. United States	409 U.S. 151	1972
Neil v. Biggers	409 U.S. 188	1972
Trafficante v. Metro. Life Ins. Co.	409 U.S. 205	1972
NLRB v. Textile Workers Union	409 U.S. 213	1972
Swenson v. Stidham	409 U.S. 224	1972
One Lot Emerald Cut Stones v. United States	409 U.S. 232	1972
Dillard v. Indus. Comm'n	409 U.S. 238	1972
Erlenbaugh v. United States	409 U.S. 239	1972
Executive Jet Aviation, Inc. v. City of Cleveland	409 U.S. 249	1972
Heublein, Inc. v. S.C. Tax Comm'n	409 U.S. 275	1972
Nebraska v. Iowa	409 U.S. 285	1973
Ricci v. Chi. Mercantile Exch.	409 U.S. 289	1973
Couch v. United States	409 U.S. 322	1973
Bronston v. United States	409 U.S. 352	1973
Hughes Tool Co. v. TWA	409 U.S. 363	1973
Philpott v. Essex Cnty. Welfare Bd.	409 U.S. 413	1973
District of Columbia v. Carter	409 U.S. 418	1973
United States v. Kras	409 U.S. 434	1973
Richardson v. Morris	409 U.S. 464	1973
Am. Trial Laws. Ass'n v. N.J. Sup. Ct.	409 U.S. 467	1973
Almota Farmers Elevator & Warehouse Co. v. United States	409 U.S. 470	1973
United States v. Fuller	409 U.S. 488	1973
Robinson v. Neil	409 U.S. 505	1973
Goosby v. Osser	409 U.S. 512	1973
Ham v. South Carolina	409 U.S. 524	1973
Gomez v. Perez	409 U.S. 535	1973
Ind. Emp. Sec. Div. v. Burney	409 U.S. 540	1973
