= List of United States Supreme Court cases, volume 534 =

This is a list of all the United States Supreme Court cases from volume 534 of the United States Reports:

Case name	Citation	Date decided
Postal Serv. v. Gregory	534 U.S. 1	November 13, 2001
TRW Inc. v. Andrews	534 U.S. 19	2001
Nebraska v. Wyoming	534 U.S. 40	2001
Correctional Serv. Corp. v. Malesko	534 U.S. 61	2001
Chickasaw Nation v. United States	534 U.S. 84	2001
Adarand Constructors, Inc. v. Mineta	534 U.S. 103	2001
United States v. Knights (2001)	534 U.S. 112	2001
J.E.M. Ag Supply, Inc. v. Pioneer Hi-Bred Int'l, Inc.	534 U.S. 124	2001
Stewart v. Smith	534 U.S. 157	2001
Granted certiorari and certified a question to the Supreme Court of Arizona; see later opinion at 536 U.S. 856 (2002).
Dusenbery v. United States	534 U.S. 161	January 8, 2002
To afford due-process notice, the government must attempt to provide actual notice, but it is not required to have succeeded in giving actual notice. Further, a better method for providing notice that was not known at the time the notice was given will not render reasonable notice unreasonable.
Toyota Motor Manufacturing, Kentucky, Inc. v. Williams	534 U.S. 184	2002
Great-West Life & Annuity Ins. Co. v. Knudson	534 U.S. 204	2002
Chao v. Mallard Bay Drilling, Inc.	534 U.S. 235	2002
Kelly v. South Carolina	534 U.S. 246	2002
United States v. Arvizu	534 U.S. 266	2002
EEOC v. Waffle House, Inc.	534 U.S. 279	2002
An agreement between an employer and an employee to arbitrate employment-related disputes does not bar the EEOC from pursuing victim-specific judicial relief, such as backpay, reinstatement, and damages, in an ADA enforcement action.
Thomas v. Chi. Park Dist.	534 U.S. 316	2002
Nat'l Cable & Telecommunications Ass'n, Inc. v. Gulf Power Co.	534 U.S. 327	2002
Lee v. Kemna	534 U.S. 362	2002
Kansas v. Crane	534 U.S. 407	2002
Owasso Independent Sch. Dist. v. Falvo	534 U.S. 426	2002
Barnhart v. Sigmon Coal Co.	534 U.S. 438	2002
The Coal Act does not permit the Commissioner to assign retired miners to the successors in interest of out-of-business signatory operators.
Wis. Dept. of Health and Family Servs. v. Blumer	534 U.S. 473	2002
Swierkiewicz v. Sorema N. A.	534 U.S. 506	2002
Porter v. Nussle	534 U.S. 516	2002
Raygor v. Univ. of Minn.	534 U.S. 533	2002
ADEA Section 1367(d) does not toll the limitations period for state law claims asserted against non consenting state defendants that are dismissed on Eleventh Amendment grounds.
