= Porter v. Nussle =

- Supreme Court of the United States

Argued January 14, 2002 Decided February 26, 2002
- Full case name: Porter et al v. Nussle
- Docket no.: 00-853
- Citations: 534 U.S. 516 (more) 122 S. Ct. 983; 152 L. Ed. 2d 12

Case history
- Prior: Dismissed, No. 3:99-cv-1091 (D Conn. Nov. 22, 1999); reversed, 224 F.3d 95 (2d Cir. 2000); cert. granted, 532 U.S. 1065 (2001).

Holding
- The Prison Litigation Reform Act exhaustion requirement applies to all inmate suits about prison life whether they involve general circumstances or particular episodes and whether they allege excessive force or some other wrong.

Court membership
- Chief Justice William Rehnquist Associate Justices John P. Stevens · Sandra Day O'Connor; Antonin Scalia · Anthony Kennedy; David Souter · Clarence Thomas; Ruth Bader Ginsburg · Stephen Breyer

Case opinion
- Majority: Ginsburg, joined by unanimous

Laws applied
- Prison Litigation Reform Act

Porter v. Nussle, 534 U.S. 516 (2002), is a United States Supreme Court case in which the court settled an intercircuit conflict regarding civil procedure for prisoners seeking redress. The court held that prisoners alleging assaults by prison guards must meet §1997e(a)'s exhaustion requirement before commencing a civil rights action.

== Background ==
Ronald Nussle, an inmate at the Cheshire Correctional Institution in Connecticut, asserted that, on or about June 15, 1996, several correctional officers asked him to leave his cell, "placed him against a wall and struck him with their hands, kneed him in the back, [and] pulled his hair." Nussle alleged that the attack was unprovoked and unjustified, and that the officers told him they would kill him if he reported the beating.

Without filing a grievance through the Connecticut Department of Correction, on June 10, 1999, Nussle commenced an action in federal district court under 42 U. S. C. §1983; he filed suit days before the three-year statute of limitations ran out on the §1983 claim. Nussle charged, principally, that the corrections officers' assault violated his right to be free from cruel and unusual punishment under the Eighth Amendment, as made applicable to the States by the Fourteenth Amendment. The District Court, relying on §1997e(a), dismissed Nussle's complaint for failure to exhaust administrative remedies.

Construing §1997e(a) narrowly because it is an exception "to the general rule of non-exhaustion in §1983 cases," the Court of Appeals for the Second Circuit reversed the District Court's judgment; the appeals court held that "exhaustion of administrative remedies is not required for [prisoner] claims of assault or excessive force brought under §1983." Section 1997e(a) requires administrative exhaustion of inmates' claims "with respect to prison conditions," but contains no definition of the words "prison conditions." The appeals court found the term "scarcely free of ambiguity." In conflict with the Second Circuit, other Federal Courts of Appeals have determined that prisoners alleging assaults by prison guards must meet §1997e(a)'s exhaustion requirement before commencing a civil rights action.
