= Actual notice =

Actual notice is a law term, used most frequently in civil procedure. It is notice (usually to a defendant in a civil proceeding) delivered in such a way as to give legally sufficient assurance that actual knowledge of the matter has been conveyed to the recipient. Personal service, that is, physically handing something to an individual, is usually considered the least-disputable method of giving actual notice.

Actual notice may be contrasted with constructive notice, which is a way of giving notice that may not immediately bring the matter to the attention of the individual that is intended to receive the notice. Constructive notice includes, among other methods, service on an agent or family member of suitable age and discretion, service by posting (on the front door), and service by publication (as in a newspaper).
