= Dusenbery v. United States =

- Supreme Court of the United States

Decided January 8, 2002
- Full case name: Dusenbery v. United States
- Citations: 534 U.S. 161 (more)

Holding
- To afford due-process notice, the government must attempt to provide actual notice, but it is not required to succeed in providing actual notice. Further, a better method for providing notice that was not known at the time the notice was given will not render reasonable notice unreasonable.

Court membership
- Chief Justice William Rehnquist Associate Justices John P. Stevens · Sandra Day O'Connor; Antonin Scalia · Anthony Kennedy; David Souter · Clarence Thomas; Ruth Bader Ginsburg · Stephen Breyer

Case opinions
- Majority: REHNQUIST, joined by O'CONNOR, SCALIA, KENNEDY, THOMAS
- Dissent: GINSBURG, joined by STEVENS, SOUTER, BREYER

Dusenbery v. United States, 534 U.S. 161 (2002), was a United States Supreme Court case in which the court held that to afford due-process notice, the government must attempt to provide actual notice, but it is not required to succeed in providing actual notice. Further, a better method for providing notice that was not known at the time the notice was given will not render reasonable notice unreasonable.

== Background ==
While Dunsenbery was in prison on federal drug charges, the Federal Bureau of Investigation (FBI) began an administrative process to forfeit cash that officers seized when they executed a search warrant for the residence where Dunsenbery was arrested. The statute in effect at the time (19 U.S.C. §1607(a)) required the agency, among other things, to send written notice of the seizure and applicable forfeiture procedures to each party who appeared to have an interest in the property. The FBI sent such notice by certified mail addressed to Dunsenbery care of the federal correctional institution (FCI) where he was incarcerated; to the address of the residence where he was arrested; and to an address in the town where his mother lived. It received no response in the time allotted and turned over the cash to the United States Marshals Service. Subsequently, Dunsenbery moved in the federal District Court under Federal Rule of Criminal Procedure 41(e) for return of all the property and funds seized in his criminal case. The court denied the motion. The Sixth Circuit Court of Appeals vacated and remanded, holding that the motion should have been construed as a civil complaint seeking equitable relief for a due process challenge to the adequacy of the notice. On remand, the District Court presided over a telephone deposition of an FCI officer who stated that he signed the certified mail receipt for the FBI's notice to Dusenbery and testified about the FCI's procedures for accepting, logging, and delivering certified mail addressed to inmates. The court granted the government summary judgment, ruling that its sending of notice by certified mail to Dusenbery's place of incarceration satisfied his due process rights. The Sixth Circuit affirmed.

The Supreme Court granted certiorari.

== Opinion of the court ==
The Supreme Court issued an opinion on January 8, 2002.

The court described three overarching principles for deciding if notice is adequate for due process: First, to test the sufficiency of notice, courts should apply the Mullane v. Central Hanover Bank & Trust Co. standard rather than the standard in Mathews v. Eldridge. Second, due process that the method of delivering notice be reasonably calculated to give the party actual notice, not that the government successfully provide actual notice. Third, a party cannot challenge the adequacy of notice by suggesting a superior, alternative method of providing notice that was not in use at the time.
